= Seri Wawasan Bridge =

Bridge in Putrajaya, Malaysia

Seri Wawasan Bridge Jambatan Seri Wawasan
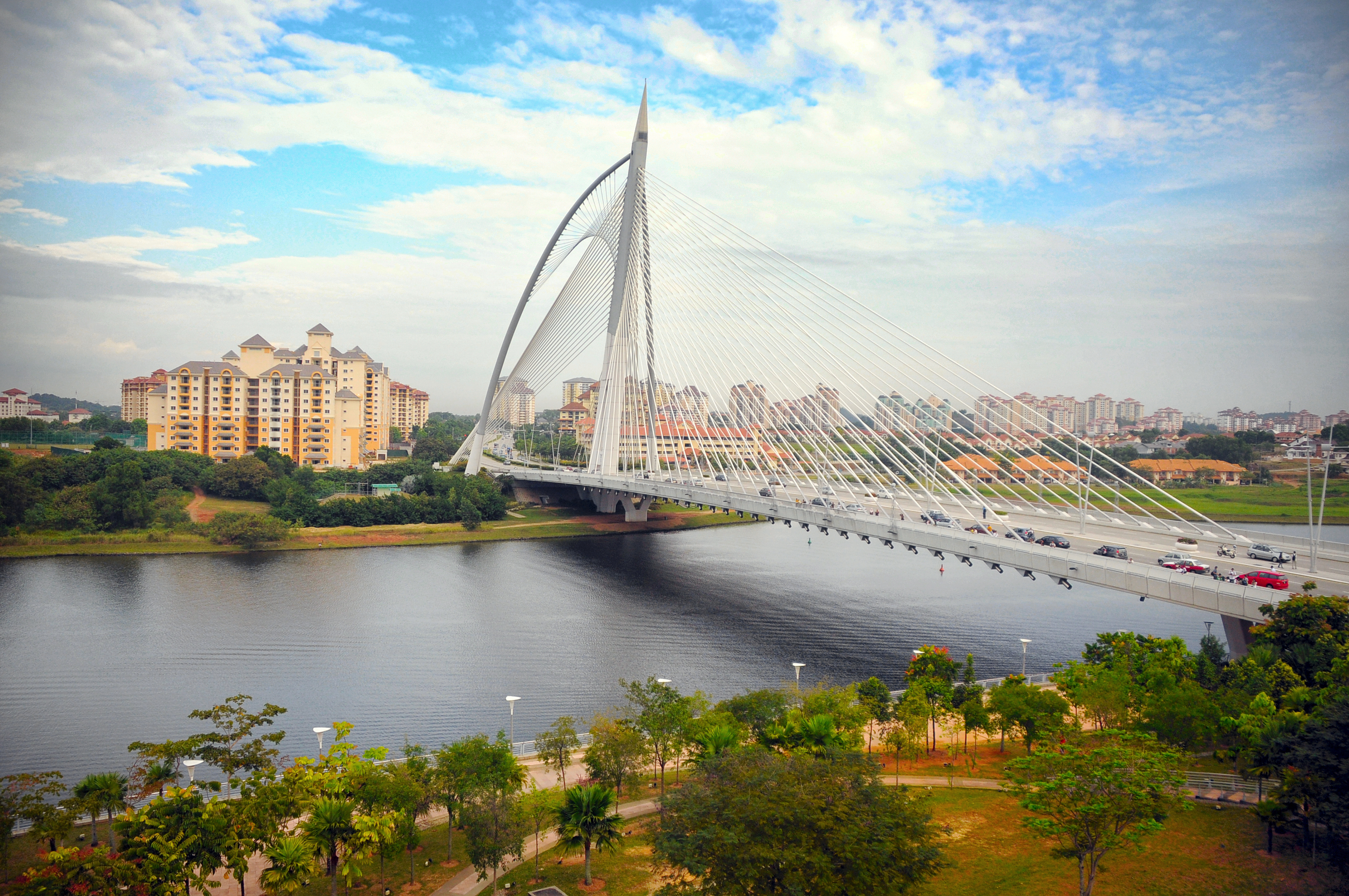
- Coordinates: 2°55′41.1″N 101°41′3.0″E
- Carries: Motor vehicles, Pedestrians
- Crosses: Putrajaya Lake
- Locale: Lebuh Seri Wawasan
- Official name: Seri Wawasan Bridge
- Maintained by: Perbadanan Putrajaya

Characteristics
- Design: cable-stayed bridge
- Total length: 240 m
- Width: 37.2 m
- Longest span: 168.5 m

History
- Designer: PJSI Consultants
- Constructed by: Perbadanan Putrajaya
- Opened: 2003

The Seri Wawasan Bridge is one of the main bridges in the planned city Putrajaya, the new (2001) Malaysian federal territory and administrative centre. This futuristic asymmetric cable-stayed bridge with a forward-inclined pylon has a sailing ship appearance, accented at night with changeable color lighting. The bridge, also called Bridge No. 9, crosses Putrajaya Lake, an artificial lake made to provide natural cooling, and connects Precinct 2 on the Core Island, where the main government buildings are located, to the residential area of Precinct 8, 9.

== Structure ==
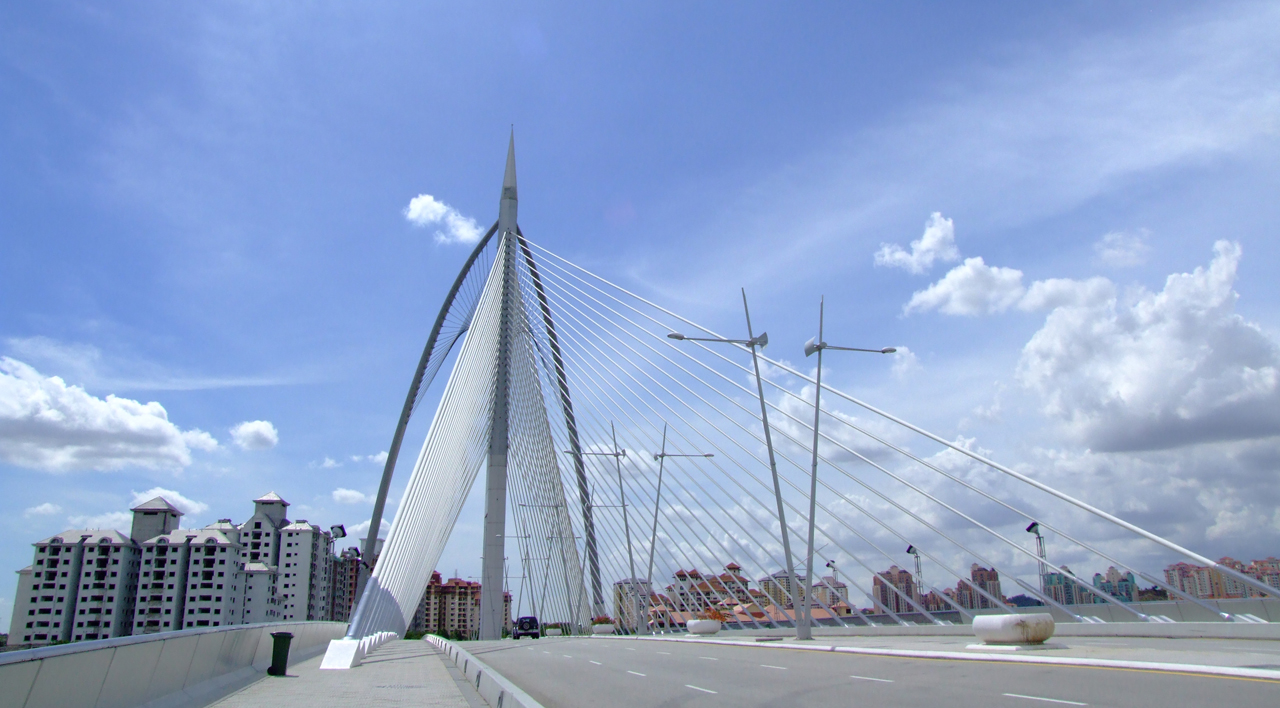
Seri Wawasan: Forward stay cables anchored on outer edges of bridge deck

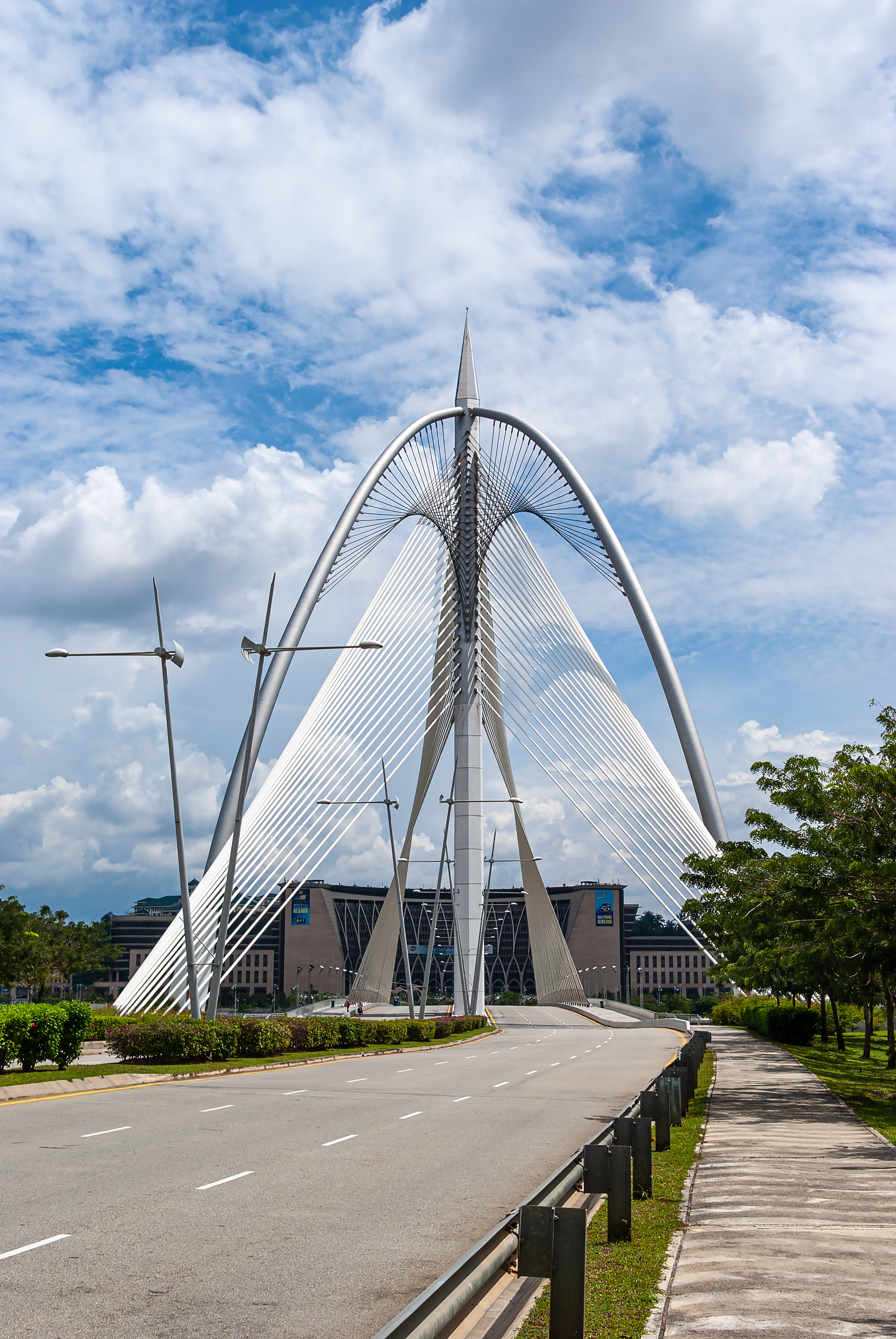
Seri Wawasan: Structural steel tie back and back stay cables anchored off roadway in Precinct 8

The Seri Wawasan Bridge is a longitudinally asymmetric cable‐stayed box-girder bridge with an inverted-Y shape concrete/steel pylon 96 metres (315 ft) high. The main span, 165 metres (541 ft) long, is supported by 30 pairs of forward stay cables, anchored on the 75° forward‐inclined pylon and on the outer edges of the bridge deck, arranged in a fan shape pattern from the side elevation. To counterbalance these front stays, a combination of 21 pairs of cable backstays and structural steel tie back was used. The back stay anchored at the (next-) highest point of the pylon is anchored at the curved backstay anchorage point (next-) nearest to the pylon, creating a crisscross‐over pattern from the side elevation, which adds to the aesthetic of the bridge. The overall complexity of the back stay tie back structure, however, may be aesthetically distracting. The inclined concrete pylon and the backstays are anchored into bore piled foundation off the roadway in precinct 8.

The bridge carries a dual three lane carriageways of 18.6 m width each, comprising 3 x 3.5 m width lanes, 0.5 m hard shoulder, 0.5 m marginal strip. The median is 4 m wide and walkway cum cycle track width is 5.1 m giving a total width of 37.2 metres (122 ft) at the centre of the bridge.

== Gallery ==
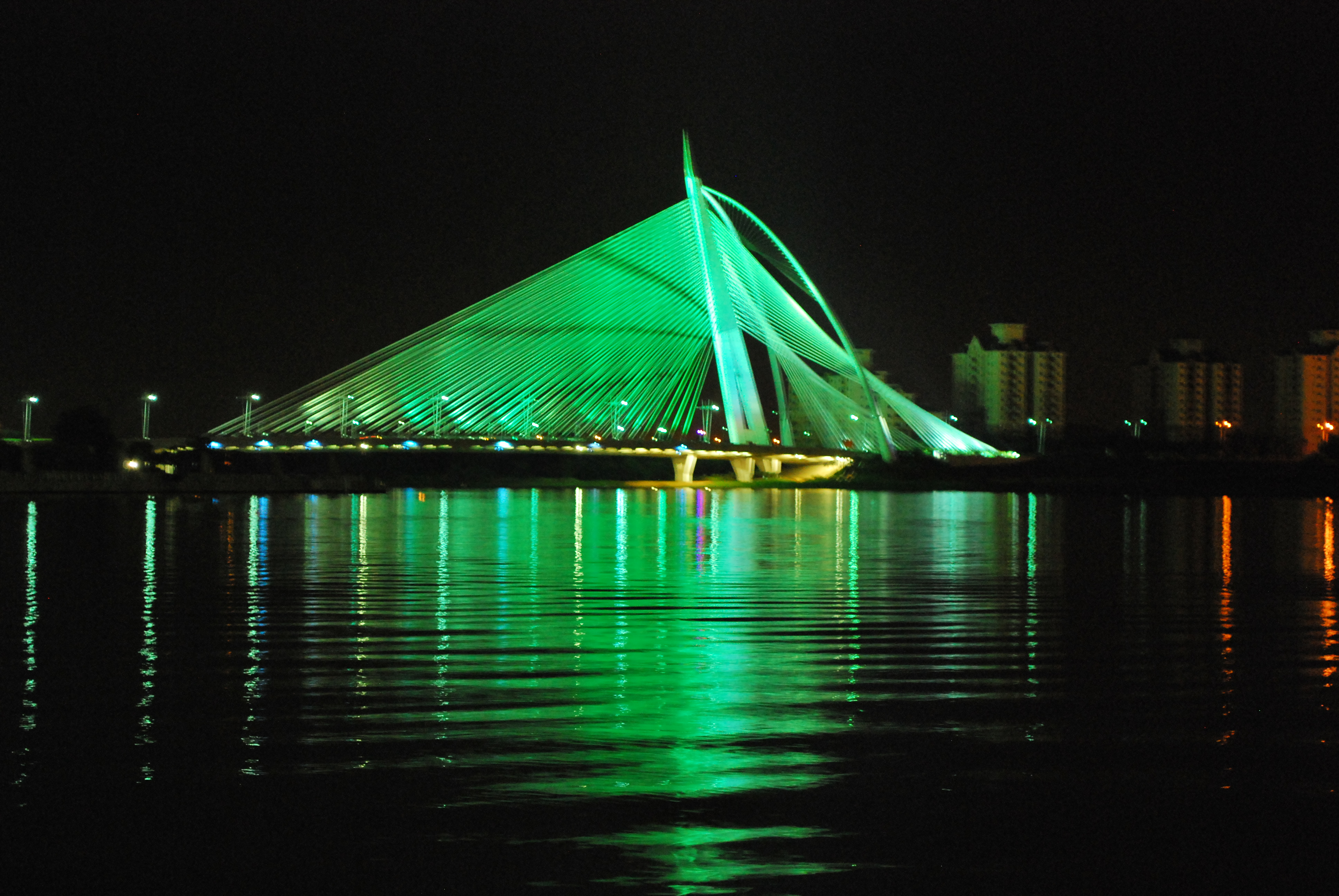
Seri Wawasan Bridge at night

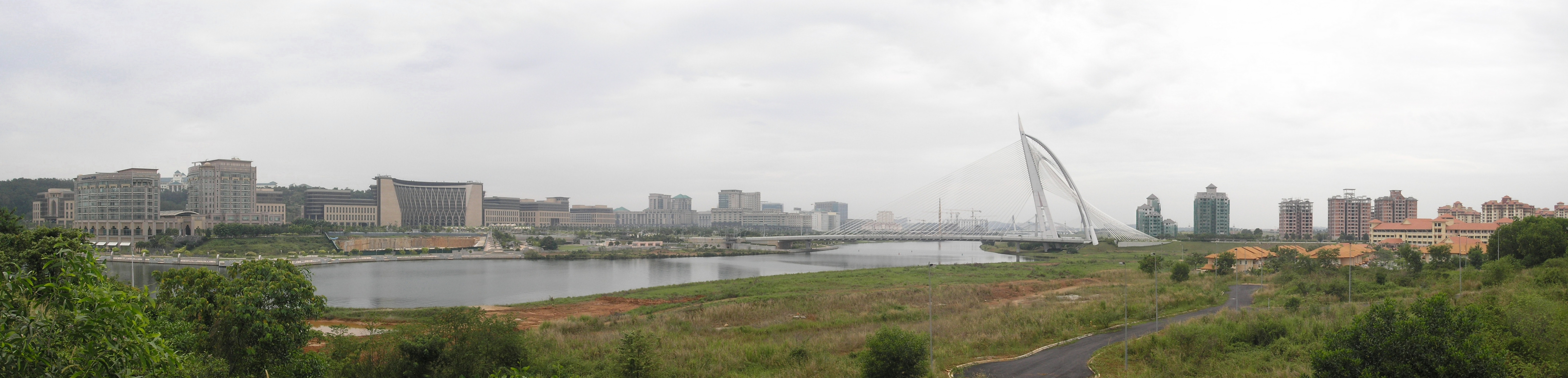
Core island, precinct 2 (left), Seri Wawasan Bridge (center), Precinct 8 (right)

Morning Traffic of Seri Wawasan Bridge (4K)

== See also ==
Other bridges providing access to the Core Island in the planned city Putrajaya, Malaysia

- Seri Saujana Bridge
- Seri Perdana Bridge
- Seri Setia Bridge
- Seri Gemilang Bridge
- Seri Bakti Bridge
- Seri Bestari Bridge
