= Putrajaya =

Administrative centre of Malaysia

Putrajaya Prang Besar
- Administrative capital and federal territory
- Federal Territory of Putrajaya Wilayah Persekutuan Putrajaya (Malay)
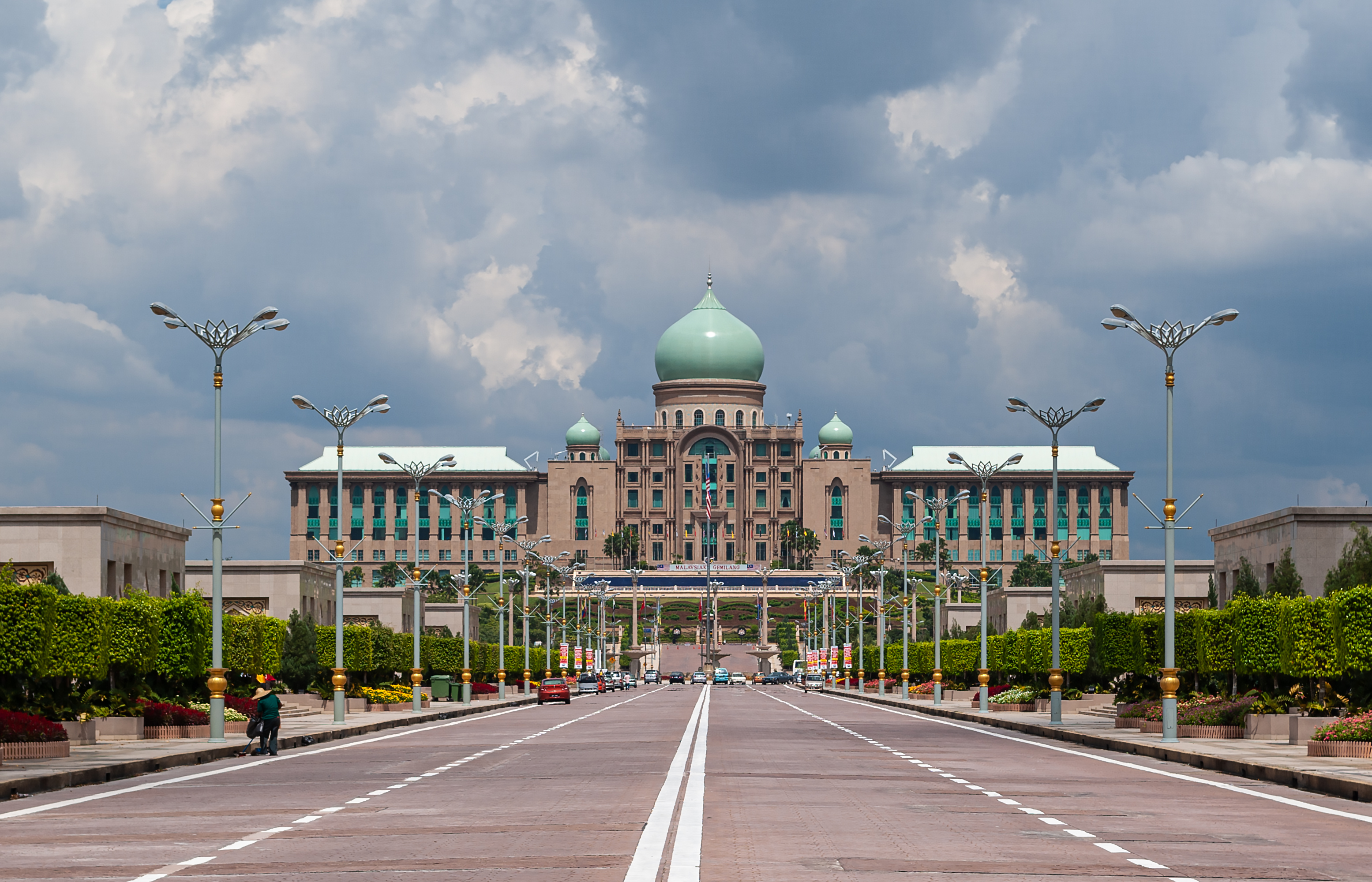
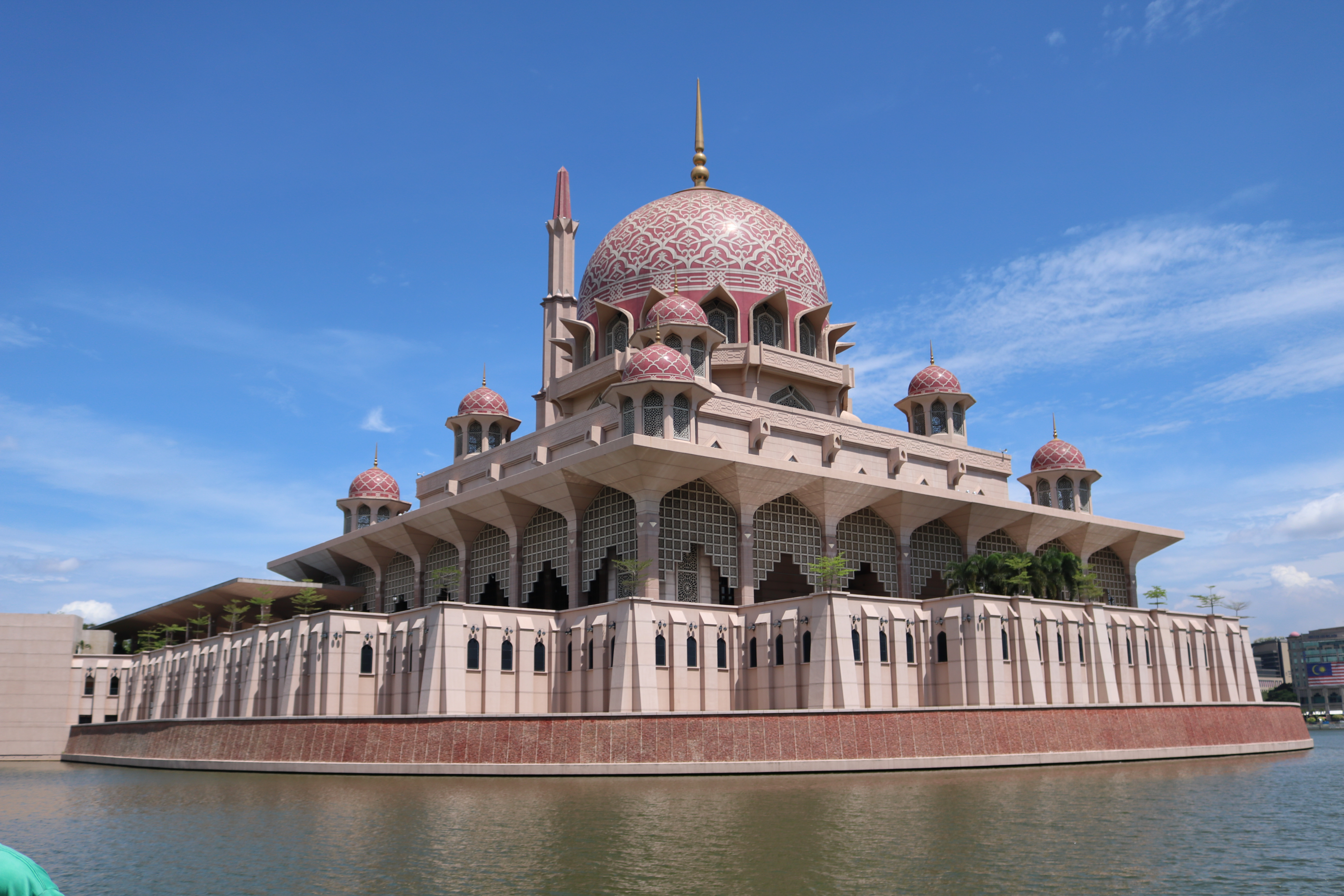
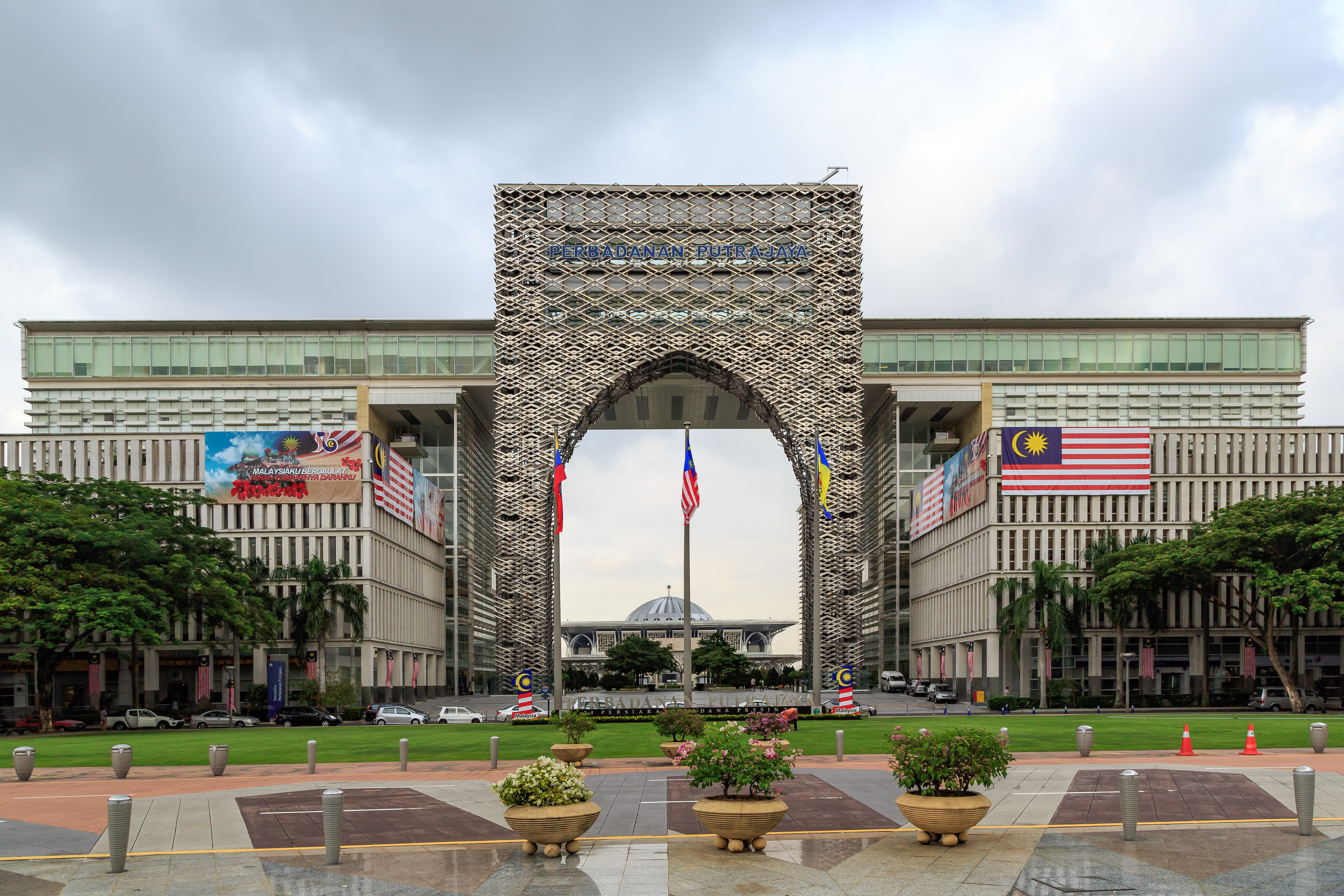
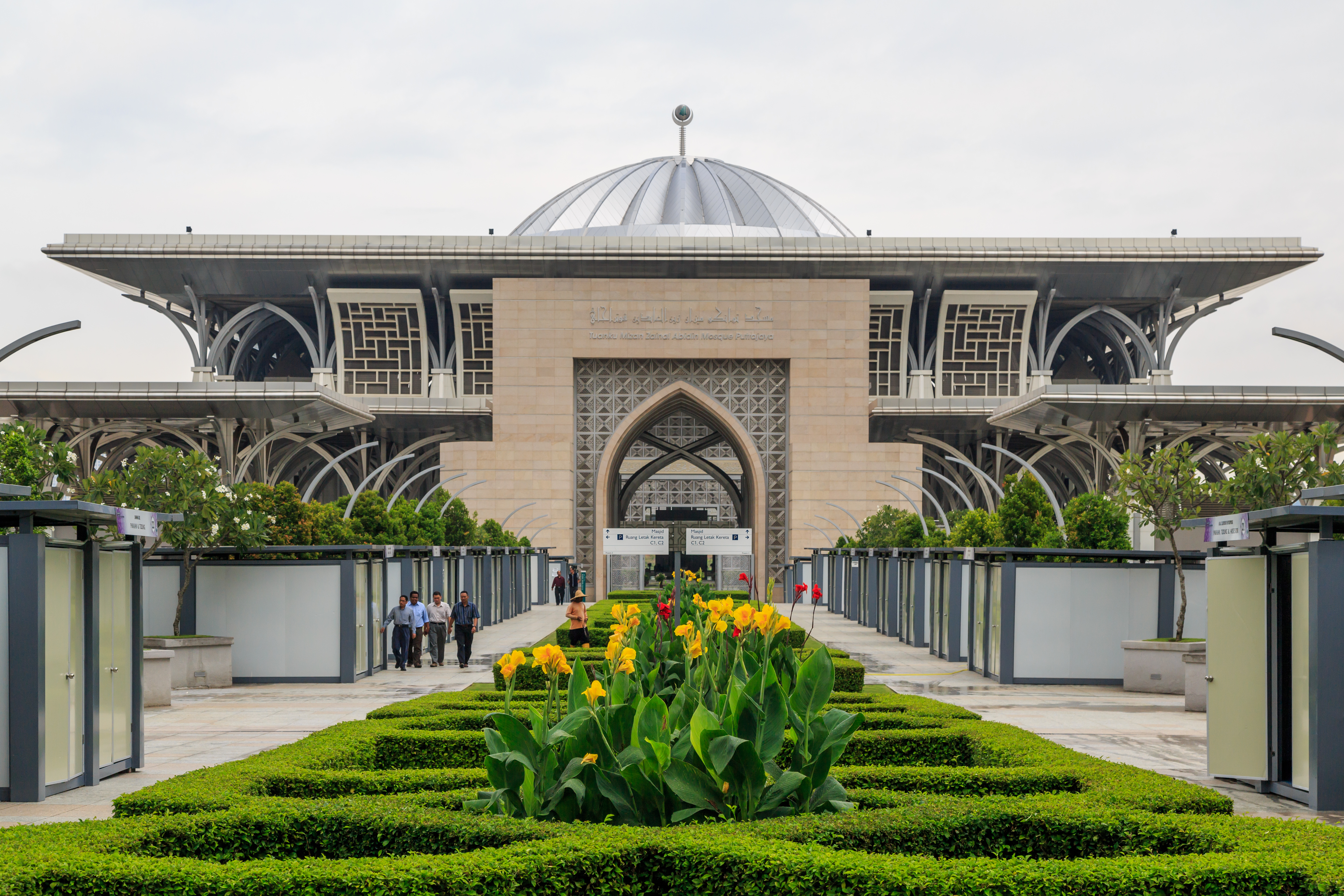
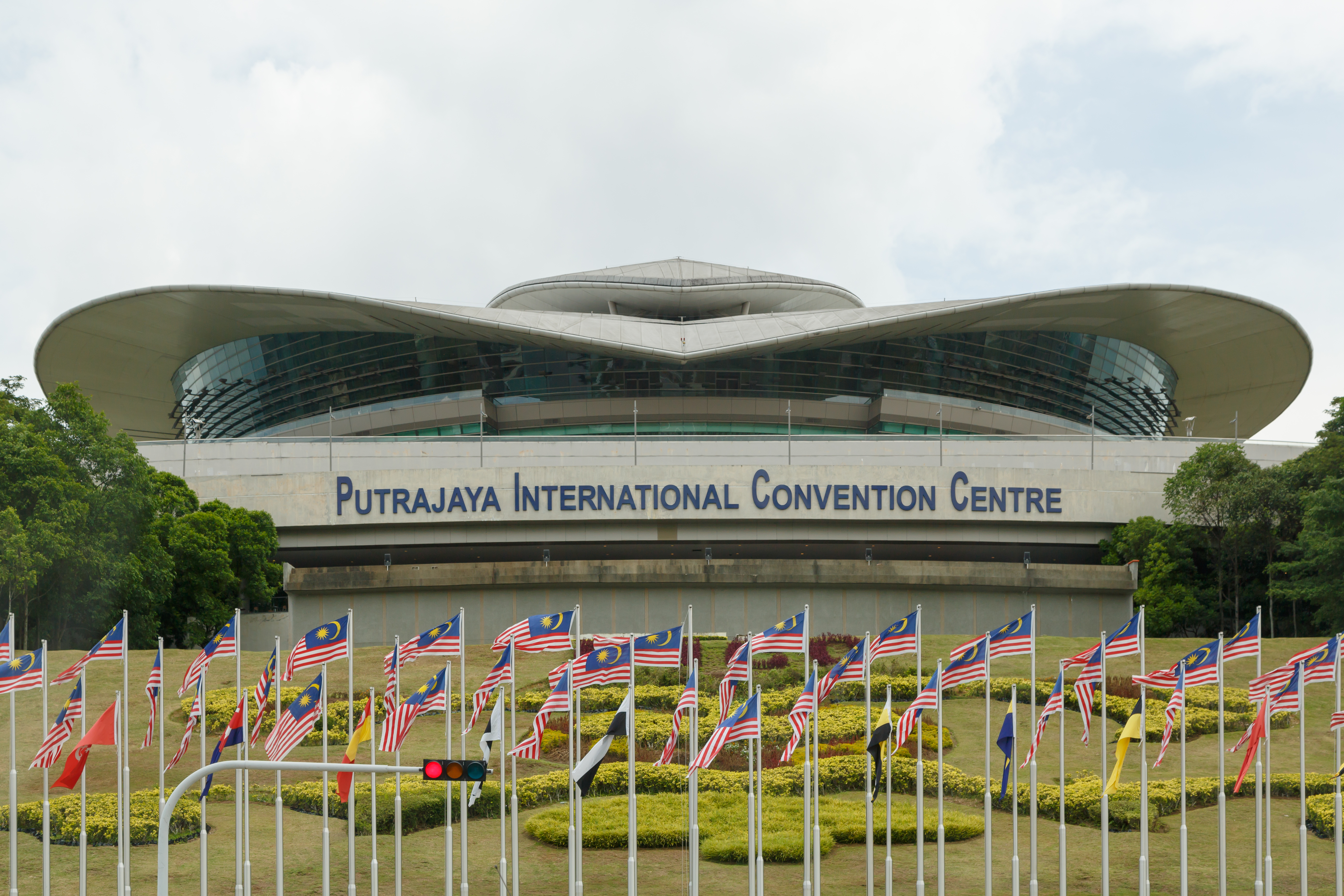
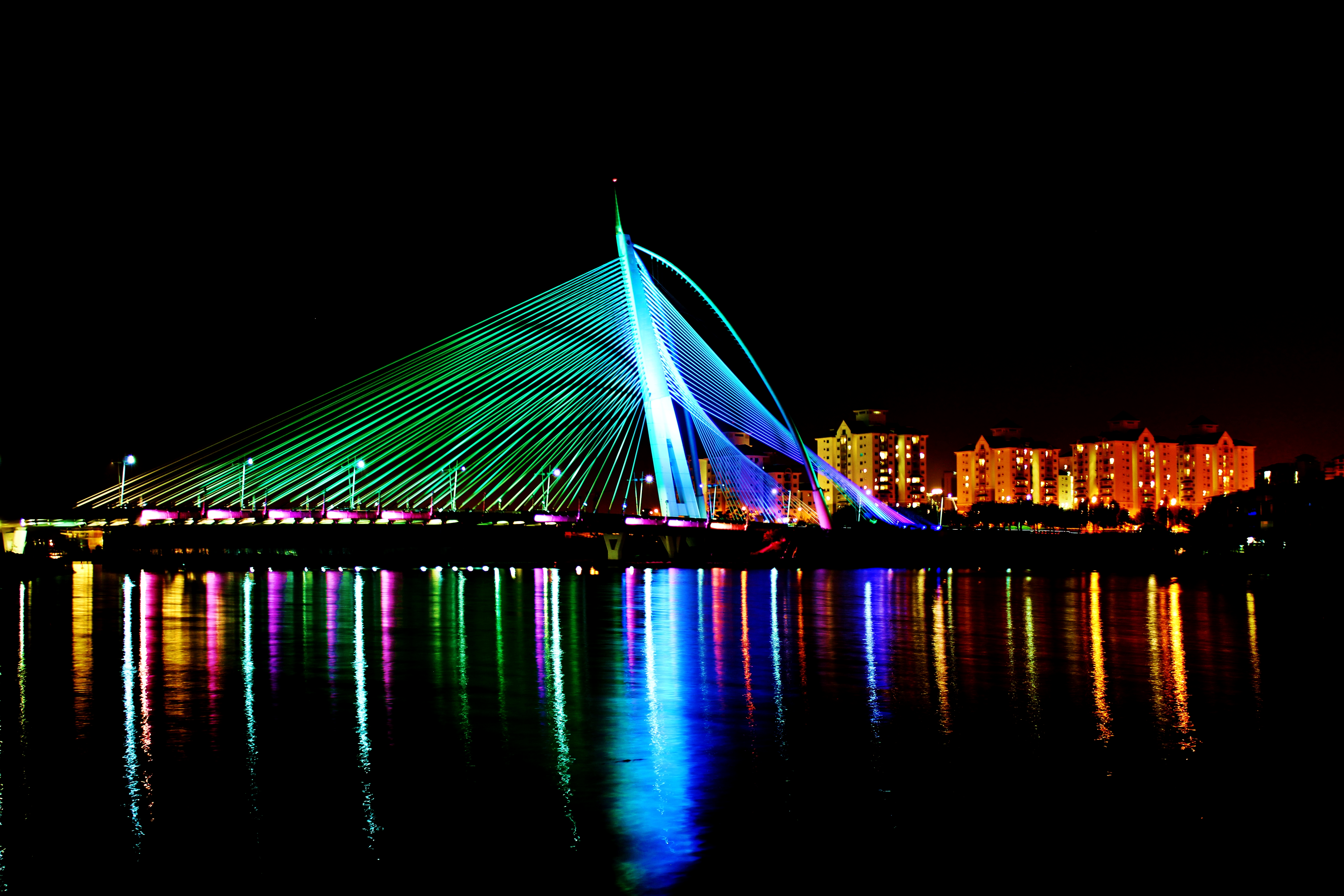
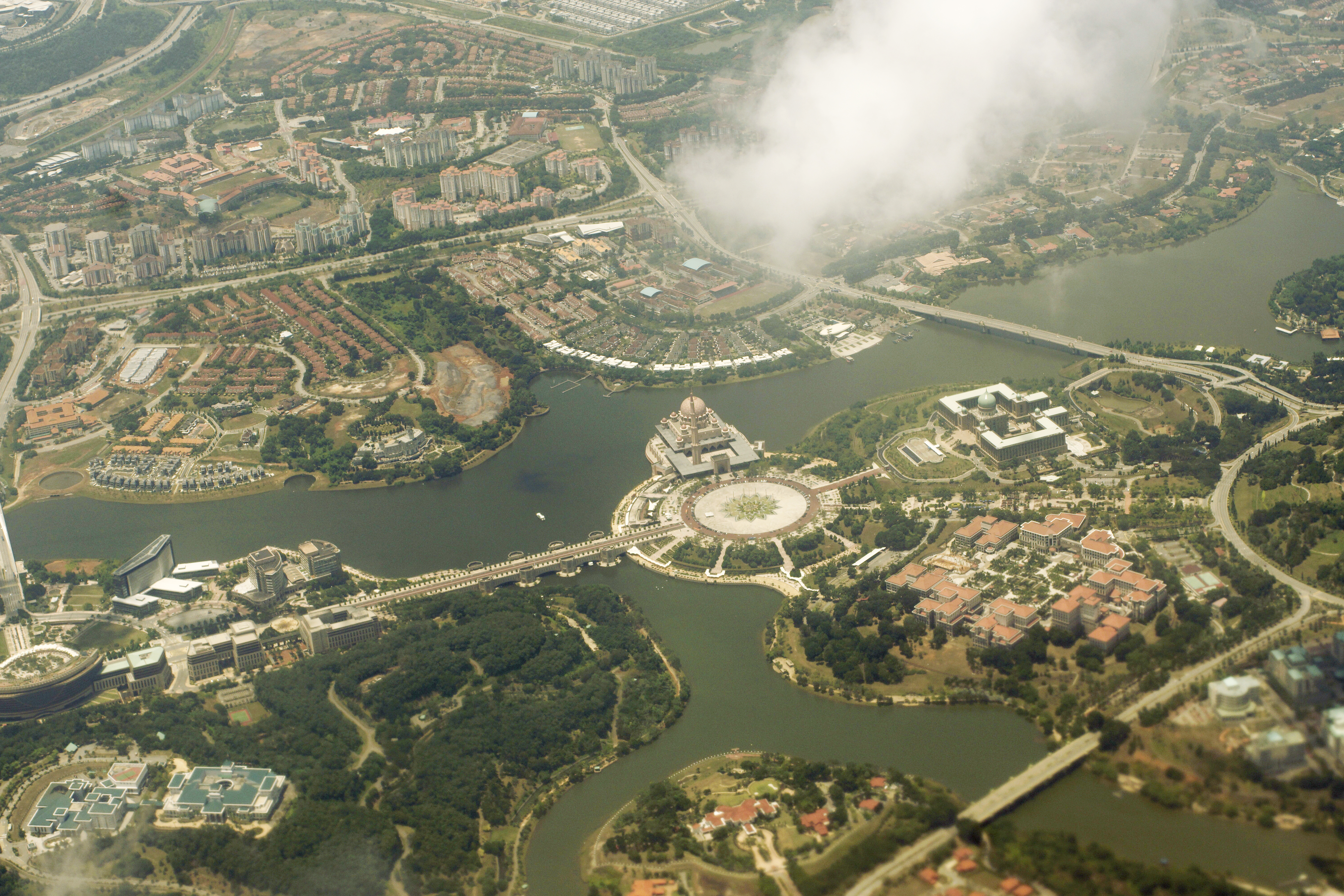
- Perdana Putra Putra Mosque Putrajaya Corporation Complex Tuanku Mizan Zainal Abidin Mosque Putrajaya International Convention Centre Seri Wawasan Bridge Aerial view of Putrajaya

- Flag Seal
- Motto: "Bandar raya Taman, Bandar raya Bestari" ("Garden City, Intelligent City")
- Putrajaya in Malaysia
- Coordinates: 02°55′48″N 101°41′24″E
- Country: Malaysia
- First settled: c. 1921
- Planned city established: 19 October 1995
- Transferred from Selangor to federal jurisdiction: 1 February 2001

Government
  - Type: Direct federal administration
  - Administered by: Putrajaya Corporation
  - President: Mohd Sakeri Abdul Kadir

Area
  - Total: 49.31 km^{2} (19.04 sq mi)

Population (2025)
  - Total: 125,200
  - Density: 2,539/km^{2} (6,576/sq mi)

Human Development Index
  - HDI (2024): 0.899 (very high) (1st)
- Time zone: UTC+8 (MST)
- Postcode: 62xxx
- Calling code: +603-88
- ISO 3166 code: MY-16
- Mean solar time: UTC+06:46:40
- Vehicle registration: F and Putrajaya
- Rapid Transit: Rapid KL
- Website: www.ppj.gov.my

Putrajaya (Malay pronunciation: [ˌputraˈd͡ʒaja, ˌputrəˈd͡ʒajə]), officially the Federal Territory of Putrajaya (Malay: Wilayah Persekutuan Putrajaya), is the administrative centre of Malaysia. The seat of the federal government of Malaysia was shifted in 1999 from Kuala Lumpur to Putrajaya because of overcrowding and congestion in the capital, followed by the seat of the national judiciary in 2003. Kuala Lumpur remains Malaysia's national capital city per the federal constitution and continues to serve as the seat of the Yang di-Pertuan Agong and the Parliament of Malaysia, as well as the nation's premier commercial and financial hub.

Conceived in the 1990s by Prime Minister Mahathir Mohamad and Kuala Lumpur mayor Elyas Omar, Putrajaya was designed as a modern greenfield administrative capital emphasizing digital communications, sustainable urban planning, and networked e-government. Construction commenced in August 1995, and on 1 February 2001, Putrajaya was formally ceded by the state of Selangor to become Malaysia's third federal territory, following Kuala Lumpur in 1974 and Labuan in 1984. An enclave within Selangor on the west coast of Peninsular Malaysia, it also forms a pivotal southern anchor of MSC Malaysia.

== Etymology ==
Putrajaya was named in honour of Malaysia's first prime minister, Tunku Abdul Rahman Putra Al-Haj. Derived from Sanskrit, putra (पुत्र) translates to "prince" or "son", while jaya (जया) means "success" or "victory"; hence, Putrajaya signifies "victorious people" or "triumphant prince". The name was formally adopted in late 1994.

== History and design ==
Putrajaya precincts

The site of Putrajaya was originally known as Prang Besar (alternately Perang Besar, Malay for "Great War"), established in 1921 as a rubber estate by British veterans of World War I. Its initial 800 acres (320 ha) expanded over the decades to 8,000 acres (3,200 ha), amalgamating surrounding plantations such as Estet Raja Alang, Estet Galloway, and Estet Bukit Prang. Historically part of Hulu Langat District until 1975, the tract was subsequently administered under Sepang District.

In the late 1980s, the federal government sought to consolidate government ministries scattered across congested Kuala Lumpur into a dedicated administrative capital. Proposed alongside an alternative site at Janda Baik in Pahang, Prang Besar was selected due to its location midway between central Kuala Lumpur and the planned Kuala Lumpur International Airport (KLIA) at Sepang. The federal government acquired approximately 11,320 acres (4,580 ha) from the Selangor state government, leaving Selangor surrounding both federal capitals.

Conceived around the principles of a "garden city" and "intelligent city", the master plan reserved nearly 40% of the territory for parks, water bodies, and landscaped open spaces. Construction began in August 1995, representing one of the largest infrastructure undertakings in Southeast Asia at an estimated cost of US$8.1 billion, designed predominantly by Malaysian firms. Much of the city's monumental public architecture integrates regional Islamic motifs, incorporating Arabesque, Persian, and Central Asian styles to convey a cosmopolitan pan-Islamic identity.

The 1997 Asian financial crisis moderately slowed construction schedules. The Prime Minister's Department relocated to the city in 1999, followed by the majority of federal civil servants between 2000 and 2005. On 1 February 2001, Putrajaya was officially established as a federal territory. Rail transport arrived in 2002 via the KLIA Transit line at Putrajaya Sentral. In April 2013, Putrajaya signed a letter of intent with Sejong City in South Korea to foster institutional exchanges between both purpose-built administrative capitals.

== Urban form and land use ==
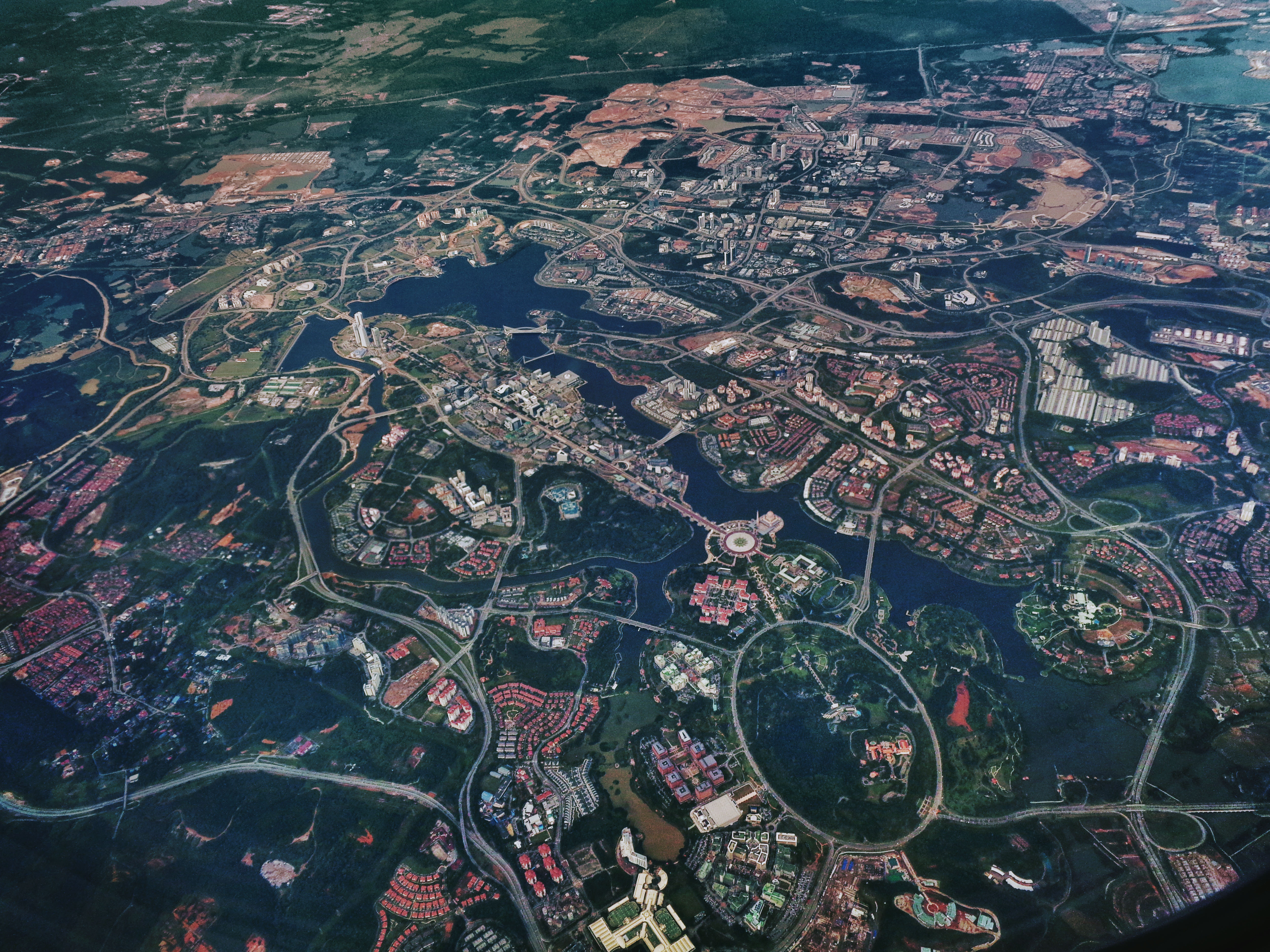
Aerial view of central Putrajaya, with the world's largest roundabout at bottom right

Putrajaya encompasses 4,931 ha (49.31 km^{2}; 19.04 sq mi) partitioned into 20 precincts. Urban spatial planning distinguishes the central Core Island (Nusa Perdana, comprising Precincts 2, 3, 4, and 18) from the peripheral sectors. The Core Island concentrates ministerial headquarters, civic squares, judicial courts, and national ceremonial boulevards, whereas peripheral precincts accommodate residential neighbourhoods, educational institutions, retail centres, and recreational reserves.

By 2025, approximately 81.7% (4,027.46 ha (9,952.1 acres)) of the territory was fully developed, 2.5% remained under active construction, and 15.8% (779.30 ha (1,925.7 acres)) was held as undeveloped reserves for future phases. Open spaces, parklands, and water bodies constitute the single largest land-use category, encompassing 1,823 hectares, including 575 ha (1,420 acres) occupied by Putrajaya Lake and the wetlands. Under the municipal master plan to 2050, open space and environmental recreation are designated to occupy 38.7% of the total land envelope, alongside transport corridors (973.5 ha), residential communities (711.3 ha), civic and institutional facilities (405.7 ha), and infrastructure reserves (390.1 ha).

=== Planning to 2050 ===
The federal territory is transitioning toward a comprehensive planning update, the Rancangan Pemajuan Putrajaya 2050 (RPP50), intended to replace the previous 2025 Structure Plan. Formulated under the vision "Smart Visionary Putrajaya", the draft roadmap focuses on economic diversification beyond public administration, greater technological integration, climate-resilient flood control, and smart-city operations coordinated through the Putrajaya Command Centre and municipal digital-twin initiatives.

== Government and politics ==
Putrajaya houses the executive and judicial branches of the federal government. Certain federal institutions remain in Kuala Lumpur, including the Ministry of Investment, Trade and Industry (MITI), the Ministry of Defence (MINDEF), and the Ministry of Works (KKR), alongside Bank Negara Malaysia, the Royal Malaysia Police, and the national legislature (Parliament of Malaysia). The official residences of the Yang di-Pertuan Agong and most foreign embassies also remain in Kuala Lumpur.

Local administration is vested in the Putrajaya Corporation (Perbadanan Putrajaya), a statutory body under the Prime Minister's Department established under the Putrajaya Corporation Act 1995.

As a federal territory, Putrajaya does not possess an elected territorial legislature. It is represented in the Dewan Rakyat by one member of parliament under the single-member Putrajaya constituency, as well as one appointed senator in the Dewan Negara.

Constituency	Seat	Member of Parliament	Party
P125	Putrajaya	Mohd Radzi Md Jidin	BERSATU

== Demographics ==
=== Population ===
Historical population
Year	Pop.	±%
2010	68,361	—
2015	88,300	+29.2%
2020	109,202	+23.7%
2025	125,200	+14.6%

Ethnic groups in Putrajaya - 2020 Census
Ethnic groups	Percent
Bumiputera	97.9%
Indian	1.2%
Chinese	0.6%
Others	0.2%

Putrajaya's resident population reached an estimated 125,200 in 2025, having grown from 68,361 in 2010 and 109,202 in 2020 at an average annual rate of roughly 4.1%.

Population density averages 2,539 inhabitants per square kilometre across the territory. The suburban residential communities of Precinct 11 (25,262 residents) and Precinct 9 (21,879 residents) account for more than a third of all inhabitants, with Precinct 9 reaching peak densities of approximately 10,330 people per square kilometre. Conversely, core administrative sectors (Precincts 2 and 4), the wetland conservation zone (Precinct 13), and the public cemetery grounds (Precinct 20) maintain no permanent residential population.

Demographically, Putrajaya is exceptionally youthful: children aged 0–14 comprised 33.2% of the population in 2025, working-age adults (15–64) made up 65.0%, and seniors aged 65 and above accounted for only 1.8%. The city recorded around 34,800 households with an average household size of 3.5 persons and an evenly balanced sex ratio of 99 males per 100 females. Official demographic forecasting projects the territory's population to reach approximately 224,000 by 2040 and 320,000 by 2050, alongside steady population ageing.

=== Religion ===
Religion in Putrajaya - 2020 Census
Religion	Percent
Islam	97.2%
Hinduism	1.1%
Christianity	0.8%
Buddhism	0.5%
Unknown / None	0.4%
Others	0.1%

As of 2020, the religious composition of Putrajaya was 97.2% Muslim, 1.1% Hindu, 0.8% Christian, 0.5% Buddhist, 0.4% non-religious or unknown, and 0.1% other religions.

== Economy ==
Putrajaya's economy is primarily sustained by public administration and services, with gross domestic product figures tracked by the Department of Statistics Malaysia jointly with Kuala Lumpur. In 2023, the local labour force numbered 58,600 with an overall participation rate of 78.6% and an unemployment rate of 0.8%. Household income levels are among the highest in Malaysia: the 2022 survey recorded a median monthly gross household income of RM10,056 and a mean income of RM13,473, against mean monthly consumption expenditure of RM8,897.

Commercial activity occupies roughly 64.6 hectares (1.3% of the land area), clustered in Precincts 1, 2, 3, 5, 8, and the Diplomatic Enclave in Precinct 15. Retail anchors include Alamanda Putrajaya, the waterfront commercial strip at Ayer@8, and civic retail complexes. In early 2025, commercial shopping complexes recorded occupancy rates of nearly 88%, whereas private purpose-built office space (410,574 m²) stood at 52.7% occupancy, overshadowed by 2.13 million square metres of government-owned ministerial office stock.

== Tourism ==
Tourism centers on the monumental architecture of federal landmarks, civic bridges, the central lake system, and major national celebrations. Principal destinations include Perdana Putra, the pink-domed Putra Mosque, Tuanku Mizan Zainal Abidin Mosque, Putrajaya Botanical Garden, the wetland eco-park, and cruise tours on Putrajaya Lake.

While day trips and festival events draw millions of visits annually, formal overnight tourism has expanded steadily post-pandemic: overnight visitors rose from 133,393 in 2021 to 777,420 in 2024, of whom 28.5% were international travellers.

== Infrastructure ==
=== Government complexes ===
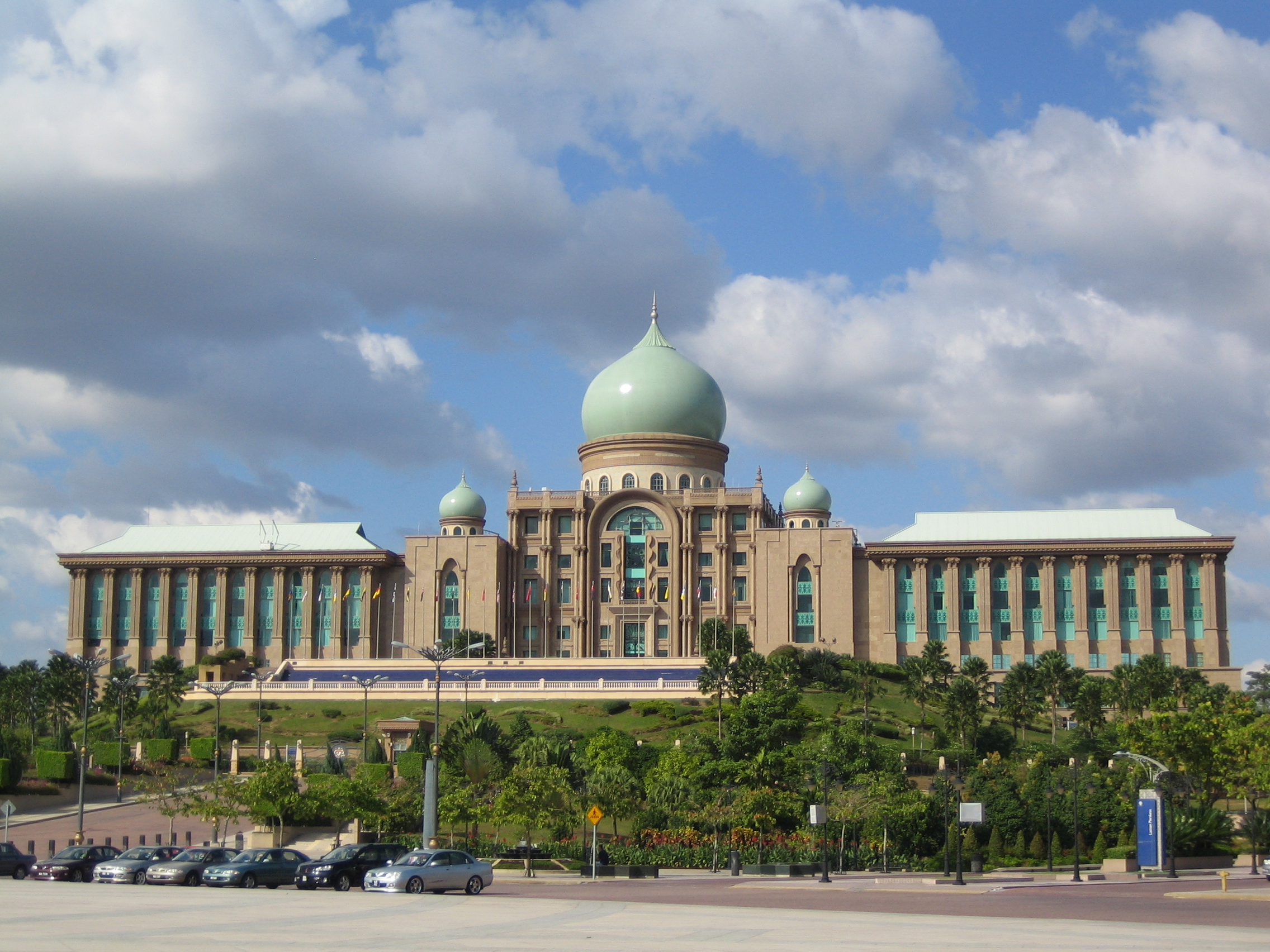
Perdana Putra, the Prime Minister's office

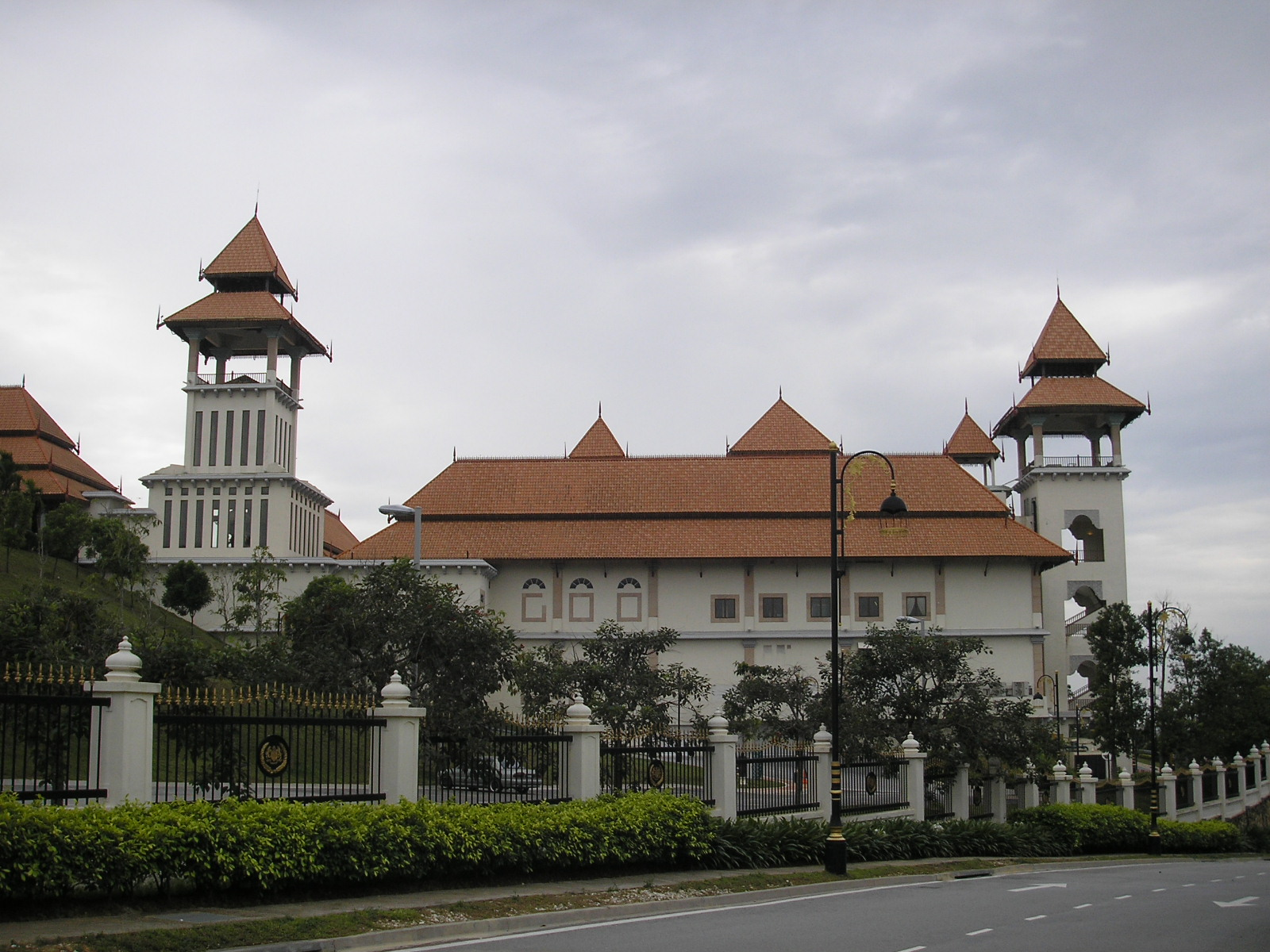
Istana Melawati

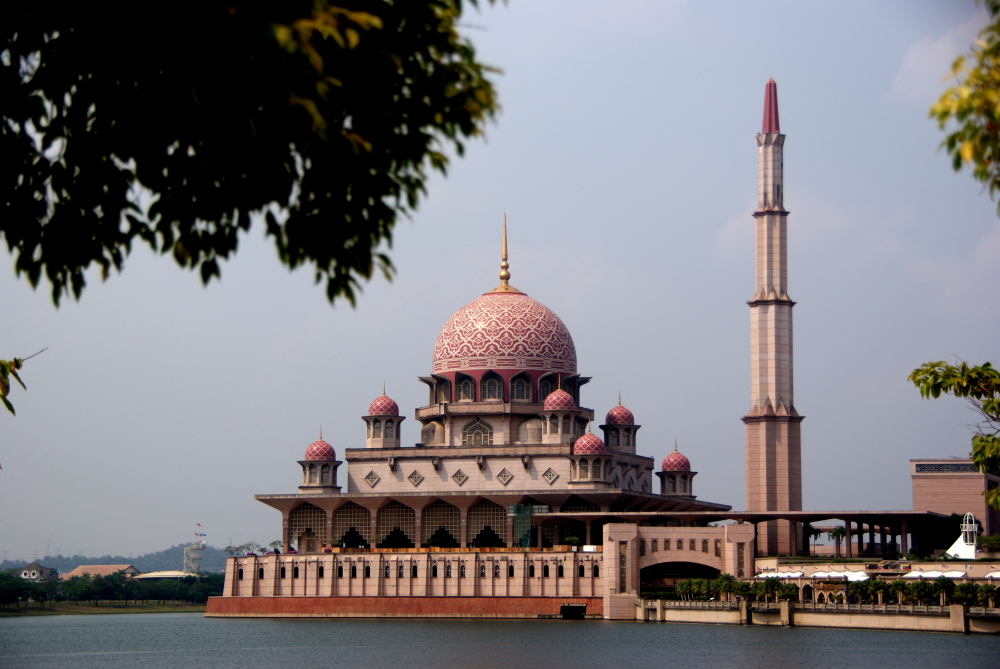
Putra Mosque

- Perdana Putra – Prime Minister's office
- Seri Perdana – Official residence of the Prime Minister
- Seri Satria – Official residence of the Deputy Prime Minister
- Palace of Justice – Seat of the national judiciary (Federal Court and Court of Appeal)
- Ministry of Finance Complex
- Wisma Putra – Ministry of Foreign Affairs
- Istana Melawati – Royal palace of the Yang di-Pertuan Agong
- Istana Darul Ehsan – Royal palace of the Sultan of Selangor
- Putrajaya International Convention Centre (PICC)
- Perdana Leadership Foundation

=== Places of worship and civic facilities ===
- Putra Mosque
- Tuanku Mizan Zainal Abidin Mosque (Iron Mosque)
- Alamanda Putrajaya Shopping Centre
- Ayer@8 Commercial Centre
- Heritage Square
- Putrajaya Corporation Complex
- Pusat Kejiranan Presint 9 and Presint 16
- PUSPANITAPURI Complex

=== Monuments ===
- Putrajaya Landmark (Mercu Tanda)
- Millennium Monument
- National Heroes Square

=== Parks and open spaces ===
- Putrajaya Lake
- Putra Square (Dataran Putra)
- Putrajaya Wetlands Park
- Putrajaya Botanical Garden – The largest botanical garden in Malaysia, covering over 92 hectares
- Taman Saujana Hijau, Precinct 11
- Taman Selatan (Southern Park), Precinct 20

=== Educational institutions ===
Primary and secondary education is provided by a network of public schools in each residential precinct, including:

- SK Putrajaya Presint 8 (1) and (2)
- SK Putrajaya Presint 9 (1) and (2)
- SK Putrajaya Presint 11 (1), (2), and (3)
- SK Putrajaya Presint 14 (1)
- SK Putrajaya Presint 16 (1) and (2)
- SMK Putrajaya Presint 8 (1)
- SMK Putrajaya Presint 9 (1) and (2)
- SMK Putrajaya Presint 11 (1) and (2)
- SMK Putrajaya Presint 14 (1)
- SMK Putrajaya Presint 16 (1)

Putrajaya also hosts two national fully residential schools:

- Sekolah Sultan Alam Shah (Precinct 1)
- Sekolah Menengah Kebangsaan Agama Putrajaya (SMAPUTRA, Precinct 11)

Higher education and international schools:

- Heriot-Watt University Malaysia – Lakeside campus in Precinct 5
- Nexus International School Malaysia – Precinct 15
- International Modern Arabic School – Precinct 14

=== Utilities ===
Treated water is supplied primarily from the Semenyih River Water Treatment Plant, operating near its design capacity of 545 million litres per day (MLD) to serve Putrajaya, Cyberjaya, and southern Selangor. Within the federal territory, treated water is held across six primary service reservoirs with a combined capacity of 228.7 million litres, with two additional storage facilities (WR7 and WR8, adding 87 MLD) planned to meet mid-century demand.

Wastewater is managed by two regional sewage treatment facilities designed for 700,000 population equivalent (PE), with an expansion of 200,000 PE planned by 2040. Municipal solid waste is transported outside the territory to the Tanjung Dua Belas sanitary landfill in Kuala Langat District; upon that facility's projected closure around 2034, waste will be routed through a dedicated transfer station to the Ladang Tanah Merah waste-to-energy facility in Port Dickson District.

== Transport ==
=== Roads ===
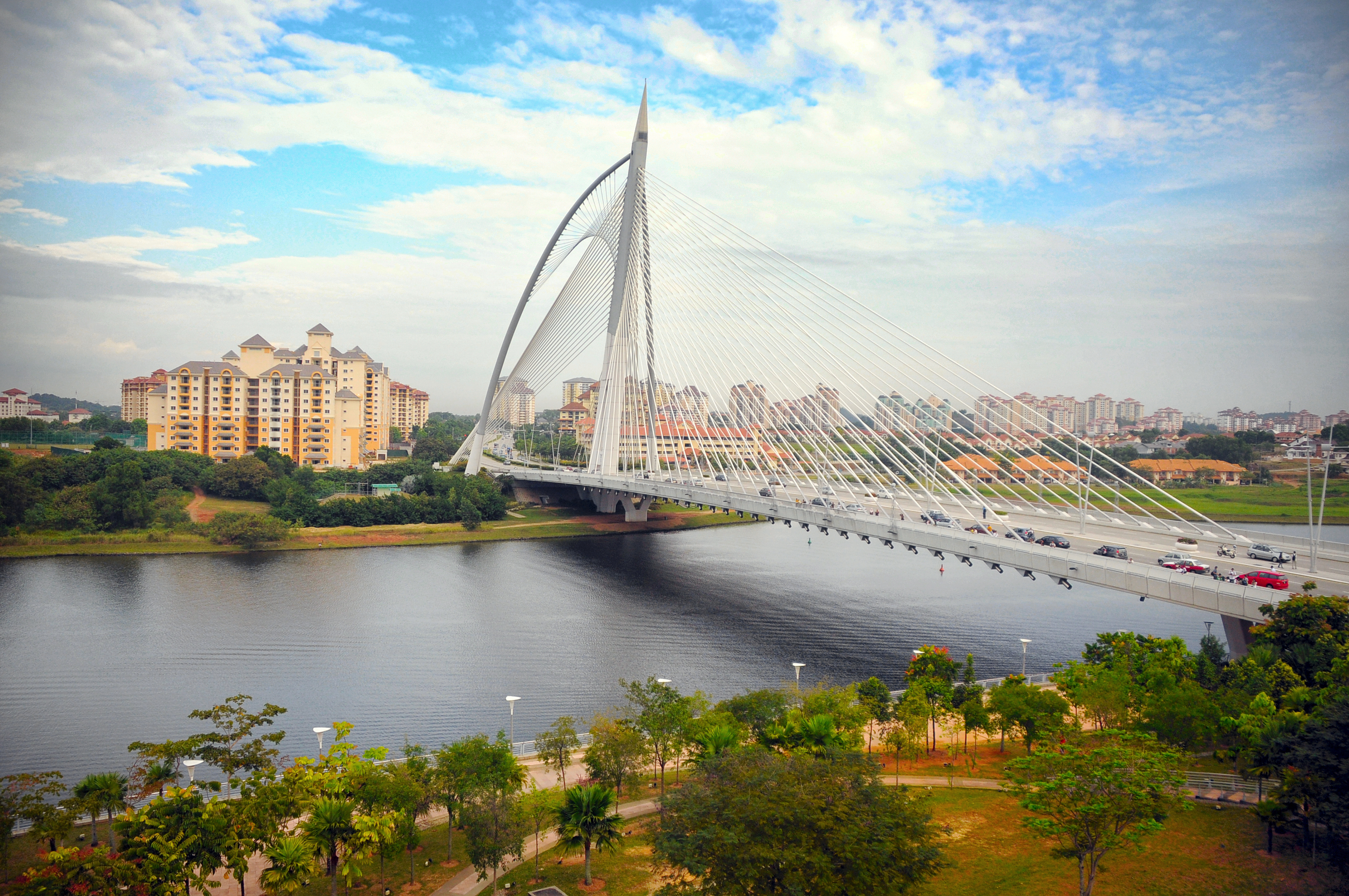
Seri Wawasan Bridge

Putrajaya is ringed by regional expressways, including the Maju Expressway (MEX, E20), North–South Expressway Central Link (ELITE, E6), South Klang Valley Expressway (SKVE, E26), and Federal Routes 29 and 30. Within the city, broad boulevards and orbital ring roads connect the precincts, notably Persiaran Sultan Salahuddin Abdul Aziz Shah—the world's largest roundabout at 3.5 km (2.2 mi) in circumference—and the ceremonial Persiaran Perdana boulevard.

==== Bridges ====
Putrajaya Lake is spanned by eight architectural bridges connecting the Core Island with peripheral precincts:

- Seri Perdana Bridge
- Putra Bridge
- Seri Wawasan Bridge
- Seri Bakti Bridge
- Seri Saujana Bridge
- Seri Bestari Bridge
- Seri Setia Bridge
- Seri Gemilang Bridge

=== Public transport and rail ===
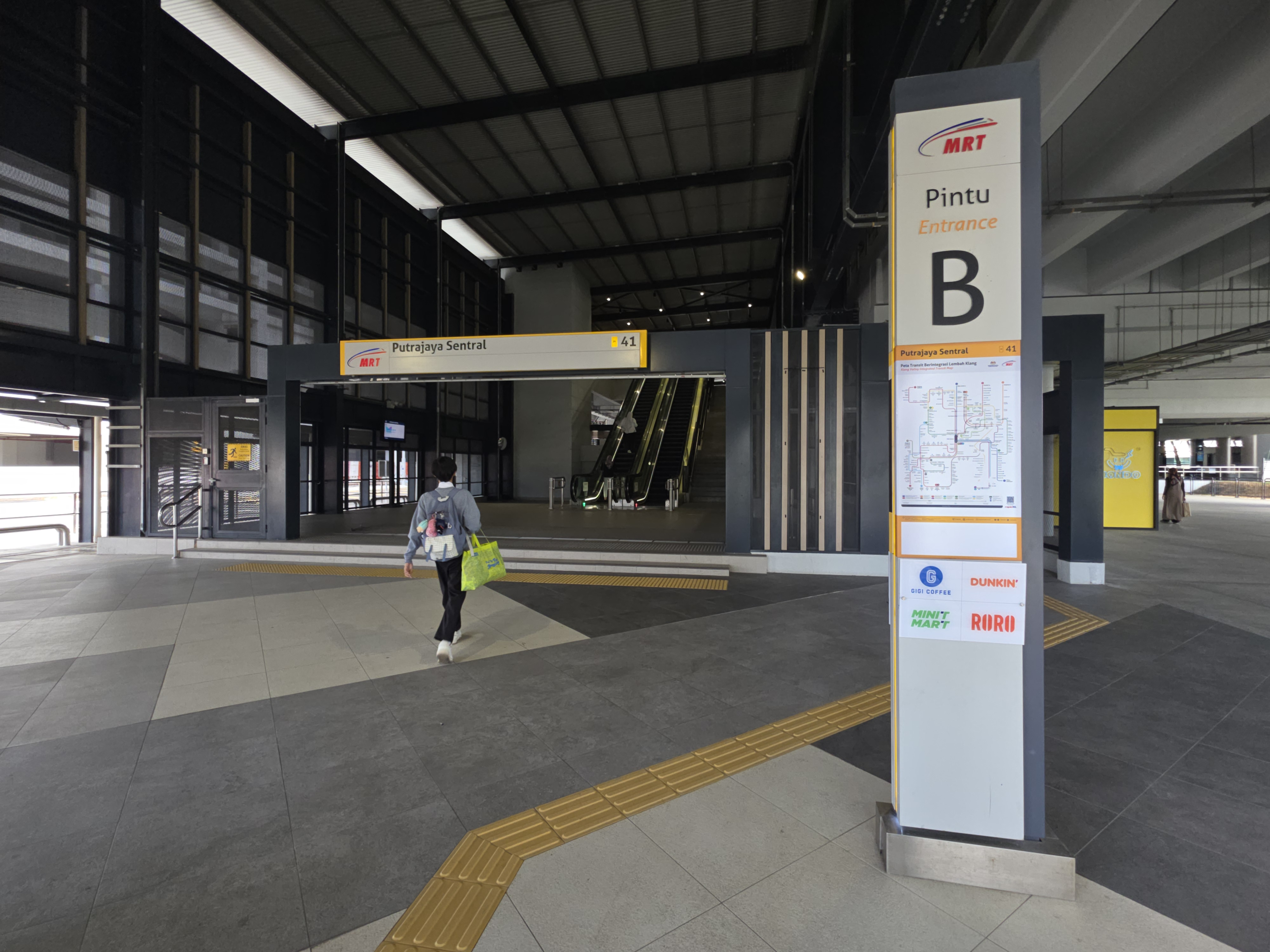
Putrajaya Sentral MRT station

An autonomous electric bus operating route P113 at Putrajaya Sentral

Putrajaya Sentral in Precinct 7 acts as the city's multimodal transit hub. It provides direct rail connections to central Kuala Lumpur and Kuala Lumpur International Airport (KLIA) via the 7 KLIA Transit line and the southern terminus of the 12 Putrajaya Line MRT.

Intra-city public transport is provided by the Nadi Putra network, operated under Rapid Bus across seven trunk routes (P101–P106, P108) connecting residential precincts with government ministerial complexes, supplemented by five MRT feeder bus routes (T508–T512). In February 2025, Rapid KL introduced on-demand transit (DRT) van services to serve first-and-last-mile connections between Putrajaya Sentral, peripheral residential blocks, Cybersouth, and Dengkil.In October 2026, the city launched an autonomous electric bus (AEV) service, route P113, operating scheduled circular trips between MRT Putrajaya Sentral and Dataran Gemilang along the Persiaran Perdana boulevard.

The city features substantial active mobility infrastructure, including 128 km (80 mi) of dedicated cycle tracks across eight urban routes, 84.9 km (52.8 mi) of paved pedestrian corridors, and 25.1 km (15.6 mi) of segregated motorcycle paths along major perimeter avenues. Nonetheless, private vehicle usage continues to dominate urban mobility: as of 2025, the modal split between private and public transport stood at approximately 80:20. Long-term planning frameworks target raising public transport use to 50% by 2040 and 70% by 2050, evaluating future possibilities such as light rail or bus rapid transit corridors.

Earlier plans for the Putrajaya Monorail were suspended in 2004 due to cost constraints, leaving an unfinished monorail bridge across Putrajaya Lake; the structure was subsequently repurposed into a pedestrian suspension bridge.

== Environment and sustainability ==
Putrajaya's master plan integrates extensive green and blue infrastructure. The city features a multi-cell constructed wetland system comprising 24 filtration cells across five arms that naturally treat surface runoff before it discharges into the 400-hectare central lake. Of the 1,411 hectares of recreational areas earmarked for permanent legal protection, roughly 68% was formally gazetted by 2025.

Under the Putrajaya Low Carbon City Model 2030, 89% of federal ministry complexes maintain a Building Energy Index below 150 kWh/m²/year. Urban solar capacity produced 5,789 MWh in 2024 toward a 2030 target of 15,000 MWh, while approximately 40% of public streetlights have been converted to energy-efficient LED fittings. Municipal sustainability challenges remain in domestic water consumption (averaging 208 litres per capita daily) and the waste recycling rate, which stood at 22% in 2025 against national long-term targets of 30%.

== International relations ==
=== Twin towns and sister cities ===
Putrajaya is twinned with:

- Cyberjaya, Malaysia
- Astana, Kazakhstan
- Sejong City, South Korea

== Climate ==
Putrajaya features a tropical rainforest climate (Köppen: Af) with warm temperatures, high humidity, and abundant rainfall year-round. Average daily temperatures hover around 27.1 °C (80.8 °F), and annual precipitation averages 2,307 millimetres (90.8 in).

Climate data for Putrajaya
Month	Jan	Feb	Mar	Apr	May	Jun	Jul	Aug	Sep	Oct	Nov	Dec	Year
Mean daily maximum °C (°F)	31.1 (88.0)	31.9 (89.4)	32.4 (90.3)	32.2 (90.0)	32.0 (89.6)	31.7 (89.1)	31.4 (88.5)	31.3 (88.3)	31.3 (88.3)	31.2 (88.2)	31.1 (88.0)	31.0 (87.8)	31.6 (88.8)
Daily mean °C (°F)	26.5 (79.7)	27.1 (80.8)	27.4 (81.3)	27.6 (81.7)	27.7 (81.9)	27.4 (81.3)	27.0 (80.6)	27.0 (80.6)	26.9 (80.4)	26.9 (80.4)	26.9 (80.4)	26.7 (80.1)	27.1 (80.8)
Mean daily minimum °C (°F)	22.0 (71.6)	22.3 (72.1)	22.5 (72.5)	23.1 (73.6)	23.4 (74.1)	23.1 (73.6)	22.6 (72.7)	22.8 (73.0)	22.6 (72.7)	22.7 (72.9)	22.8 (73.0)	22.4 (72.3)	22.7 (72.8)
Average precipitation mm (inches)	168 (6.6)	150 (5.9)	227 (8.9)	250 (9.8)	188 (7.4)	118 (4.6)	121 (4.8)	154 (6.1)	176 (6.9)	254 (10.0)	268 (10.6)	233 (9.2)	2,307 (90.8)
Source: Climate-Data.org

== Image gallery ==
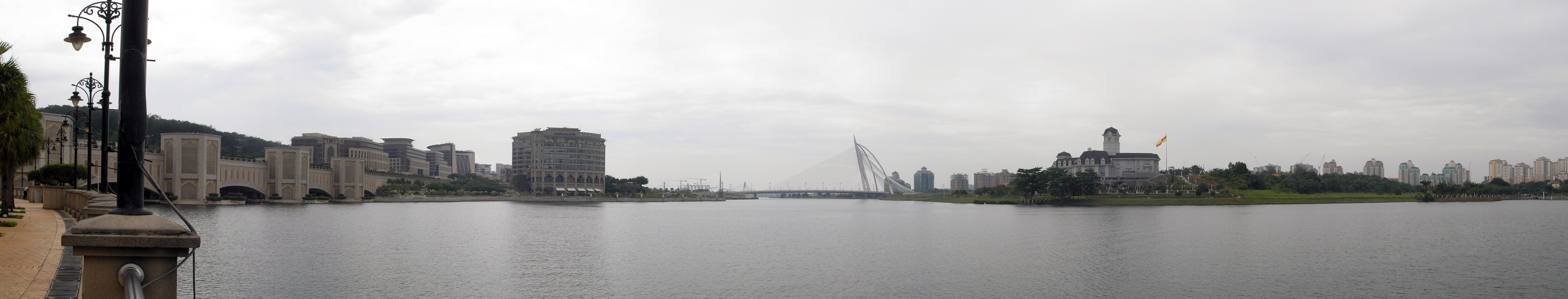
Panoramic image of central Putrajaya: (left to right) the Putra Bridge, Ministry of Finance complex, Seri Wawasan Bridge, and Istana Darul Ehsan
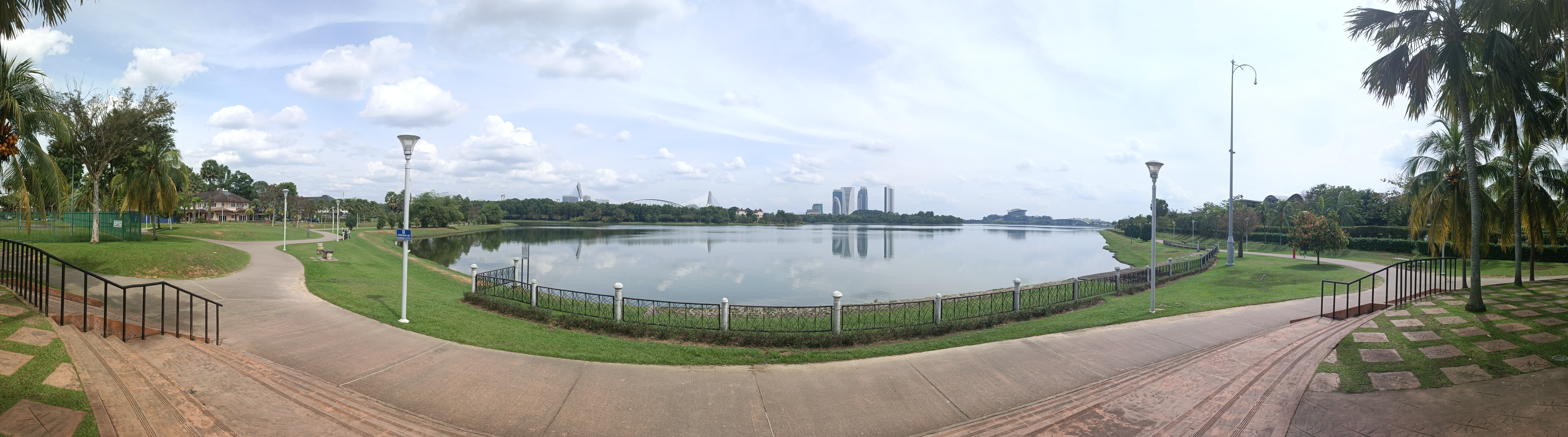
Panorama of Putrajaya across the lake from Cyberjaya in December 2022
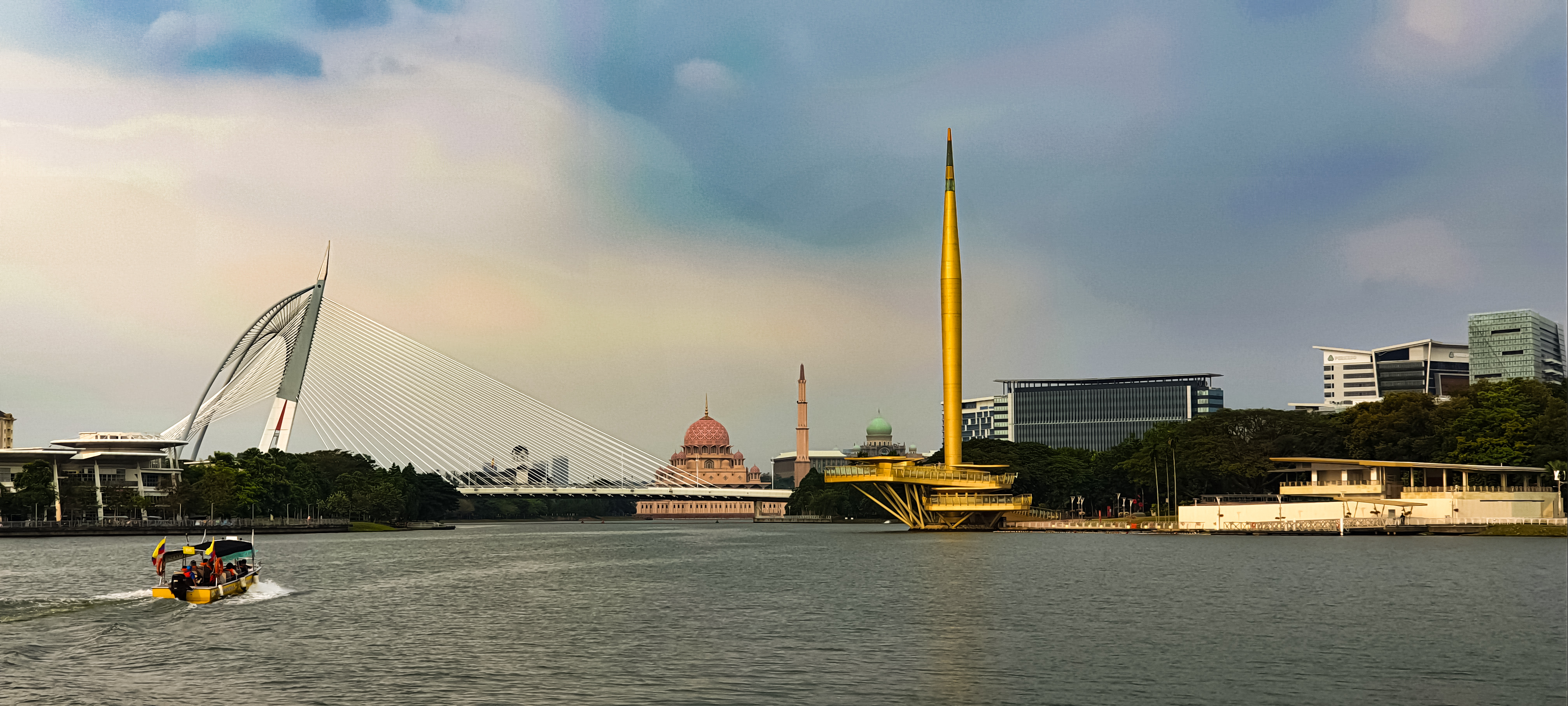
Panoramic view of Putrajaya Lake

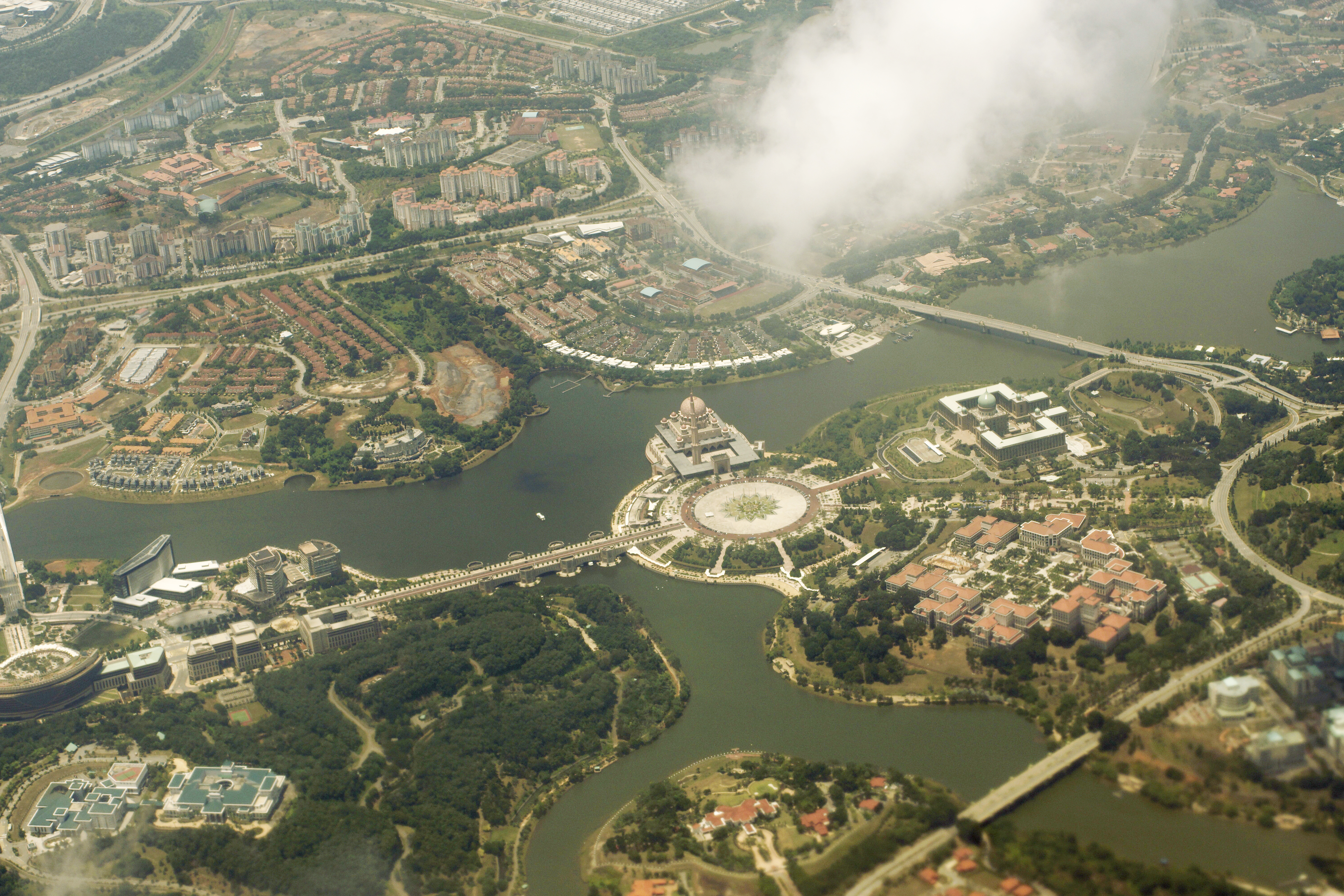
Aerial view of the federal administrative core

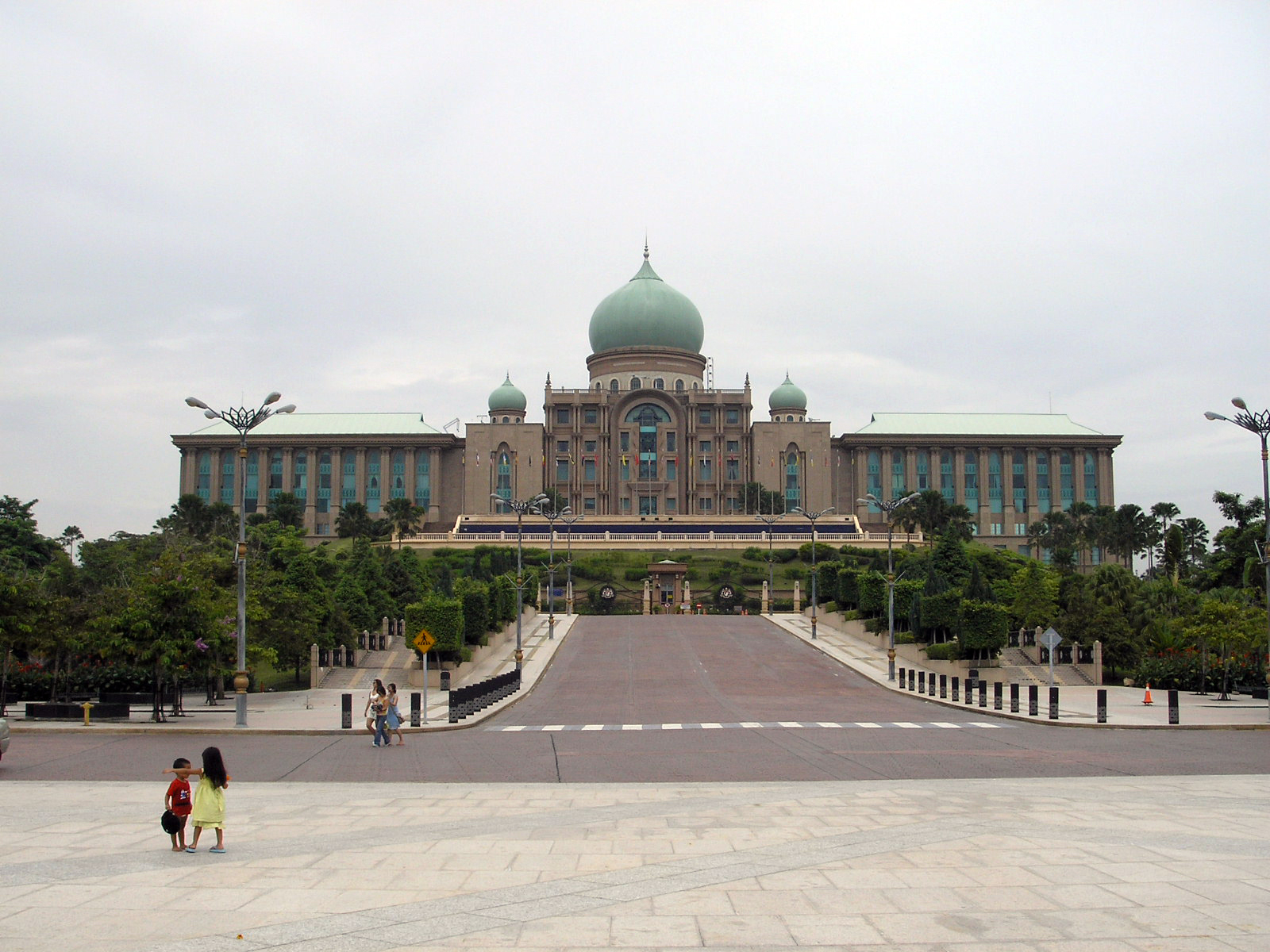
Prime Minister's Office at Perdana Putra

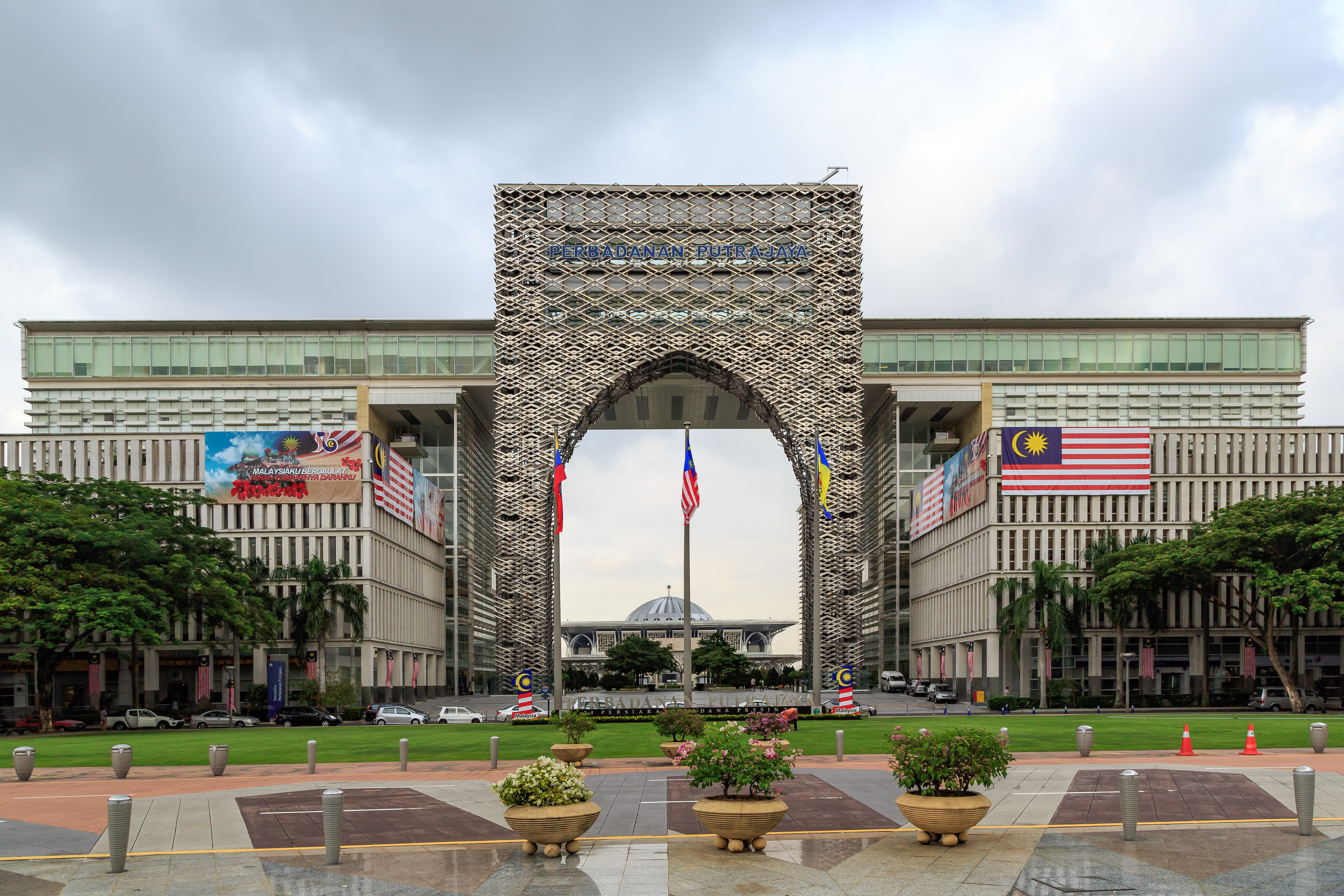
Perbadanan Putrajaya complex

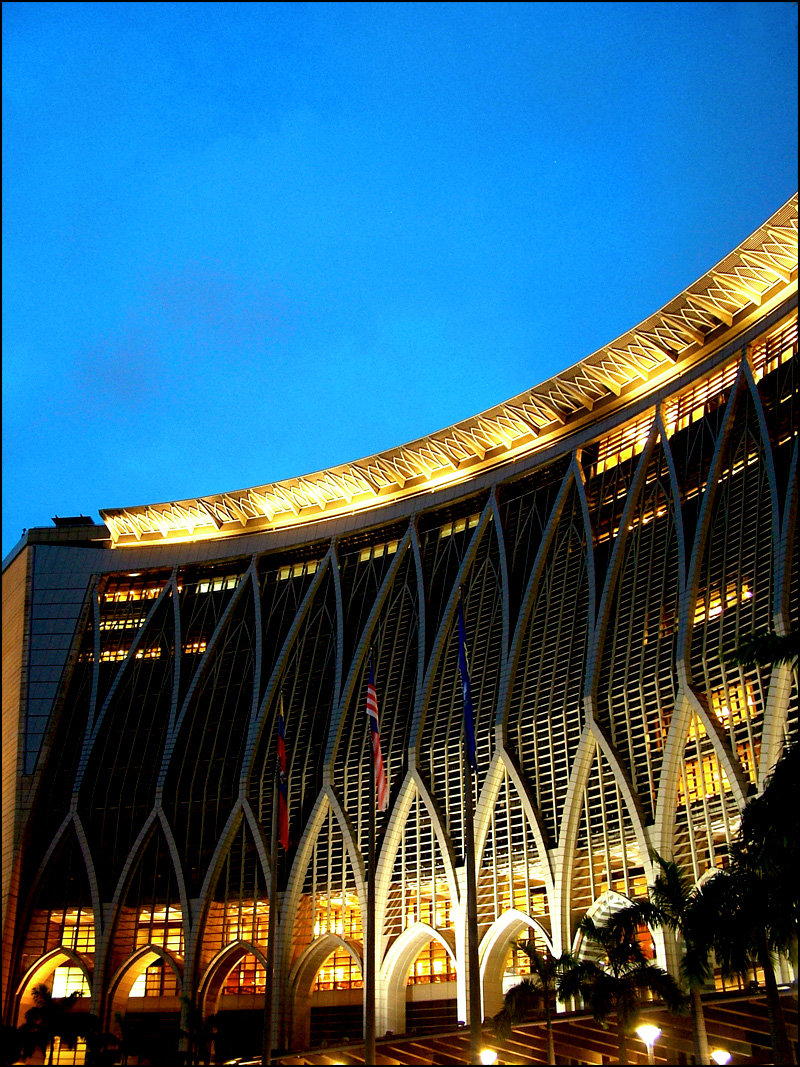
Ministry of Finance complex

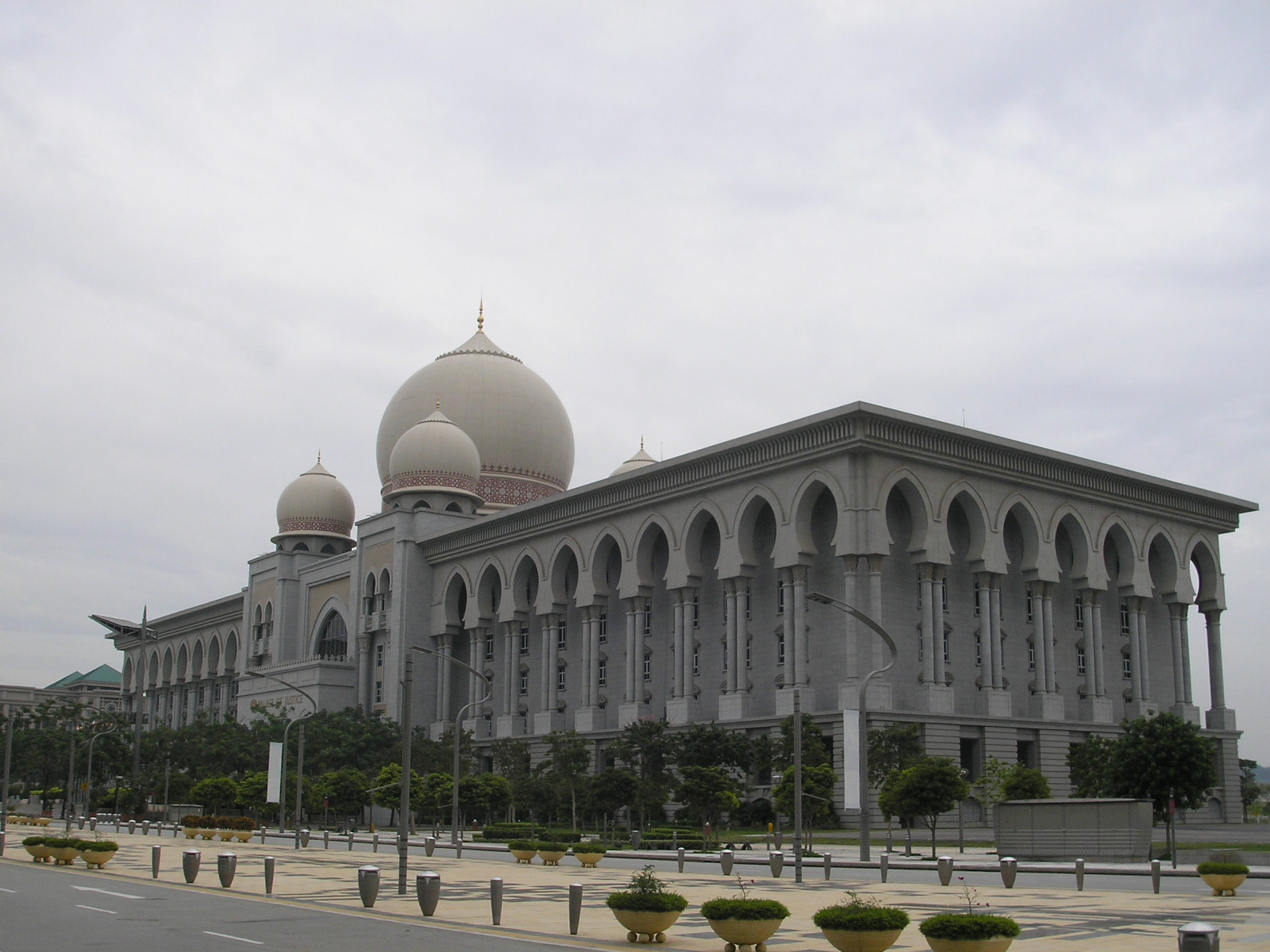
Palace of Justice courthouse

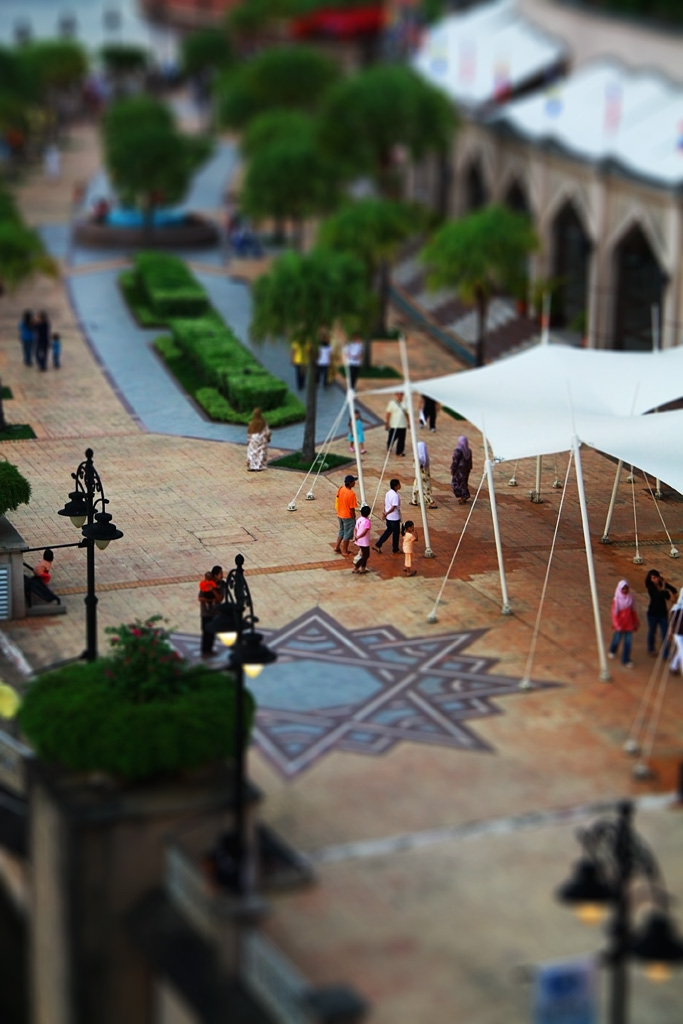
Putrajaya Walk

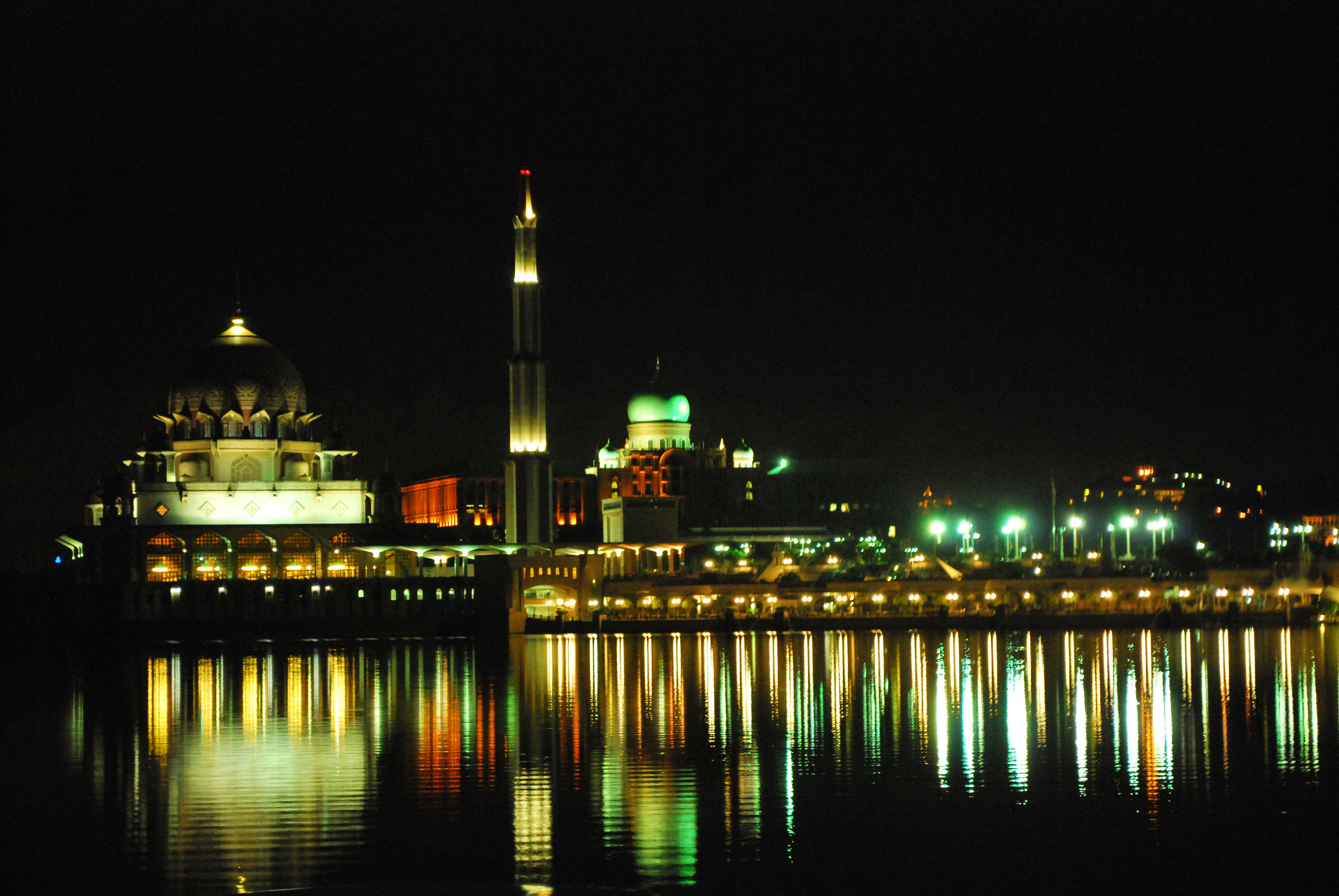
Perdana Putra and Putra Mosque at night

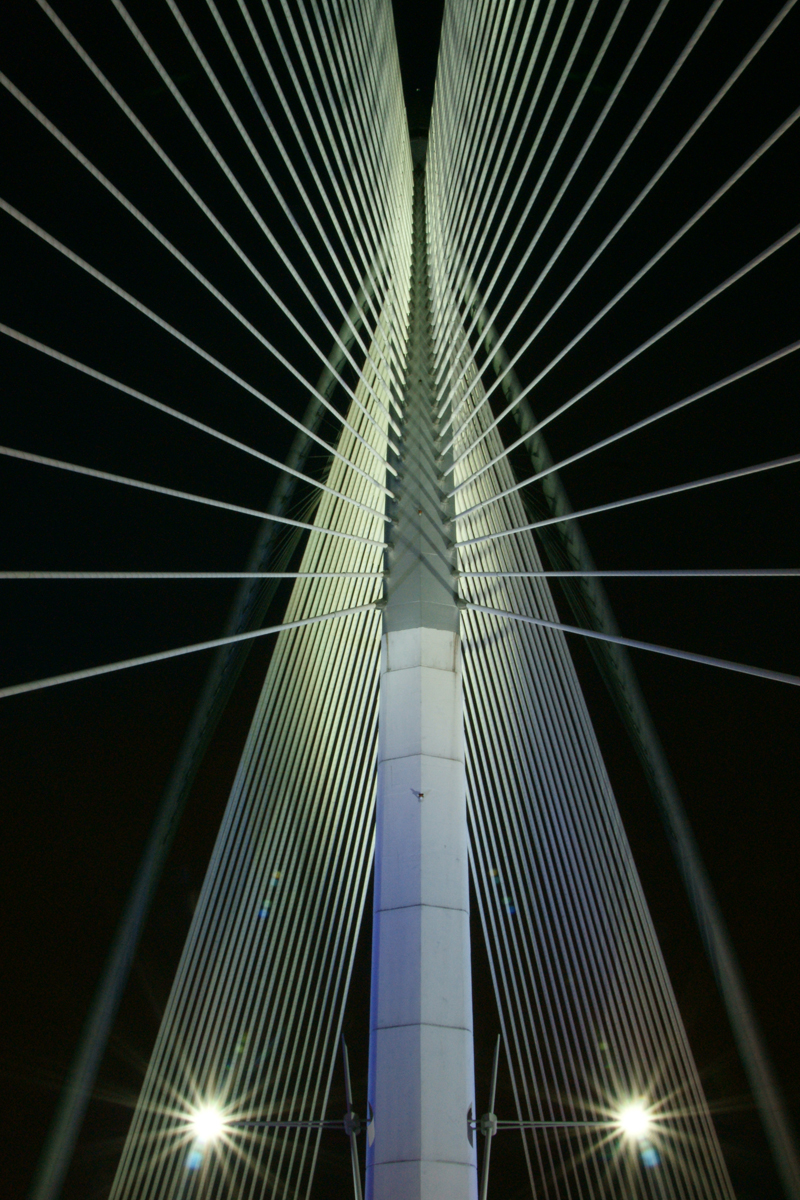
Deck view of the Seri Wawasan Bridge

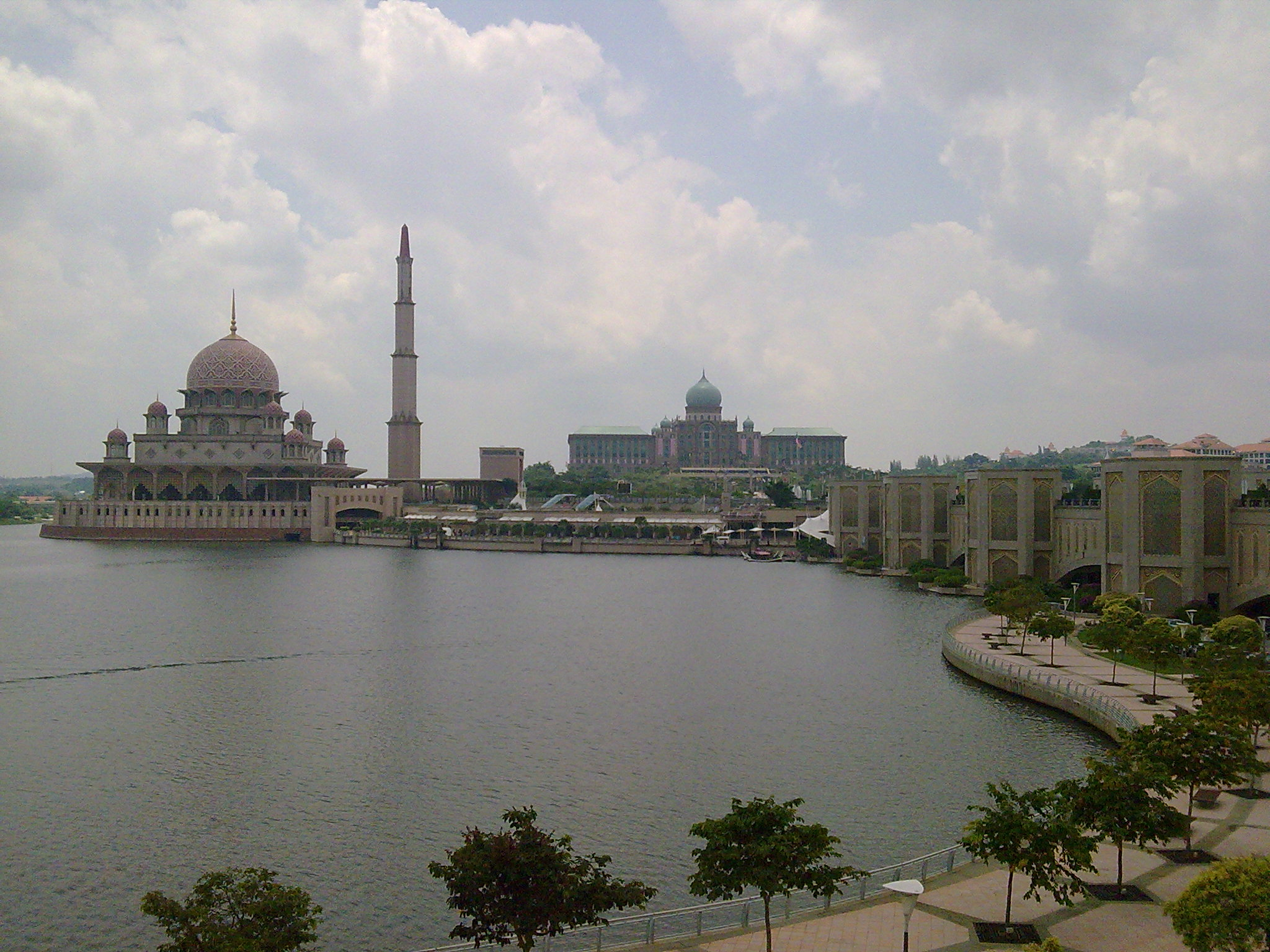
Putra Mosque along the waterfront

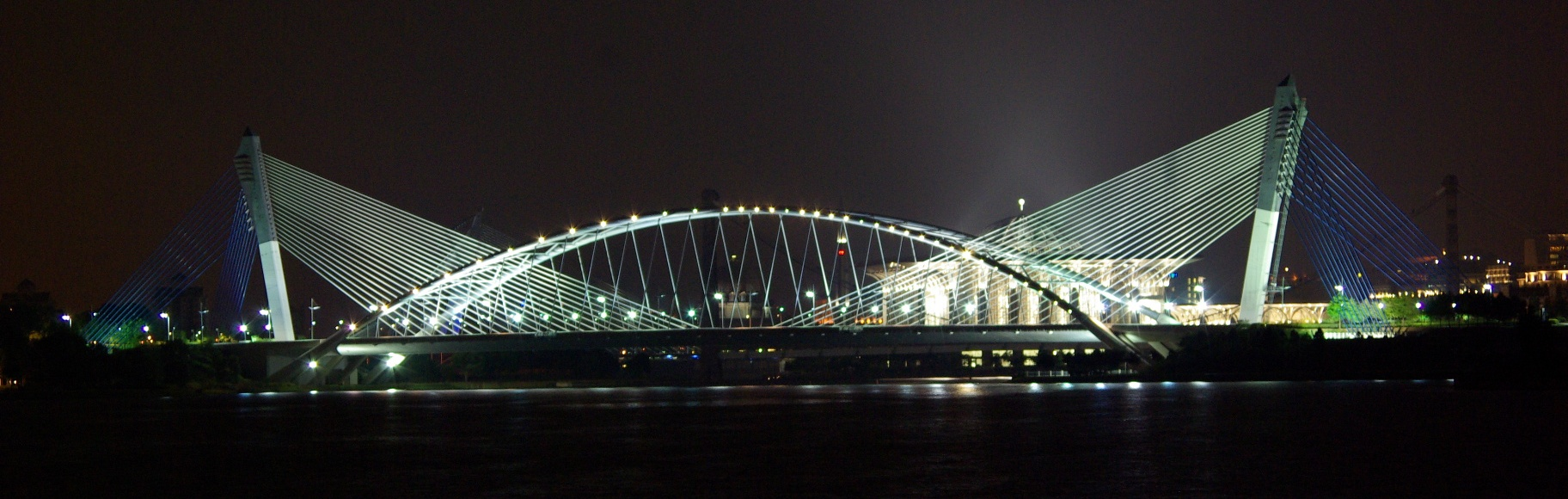
Seri Saujana Bridge illuminated at night

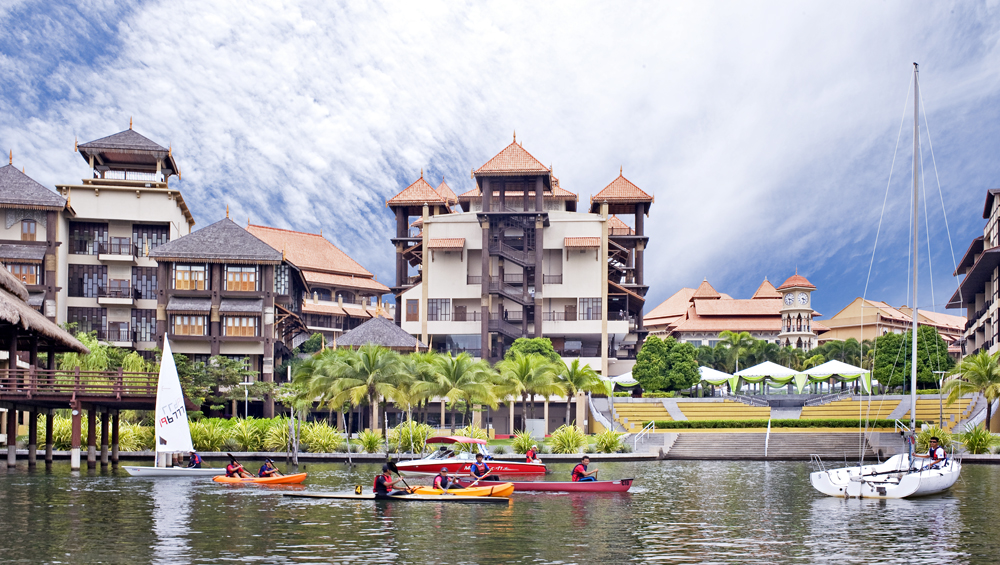
DoubleTree by Hilton Putrajaya Lakeside

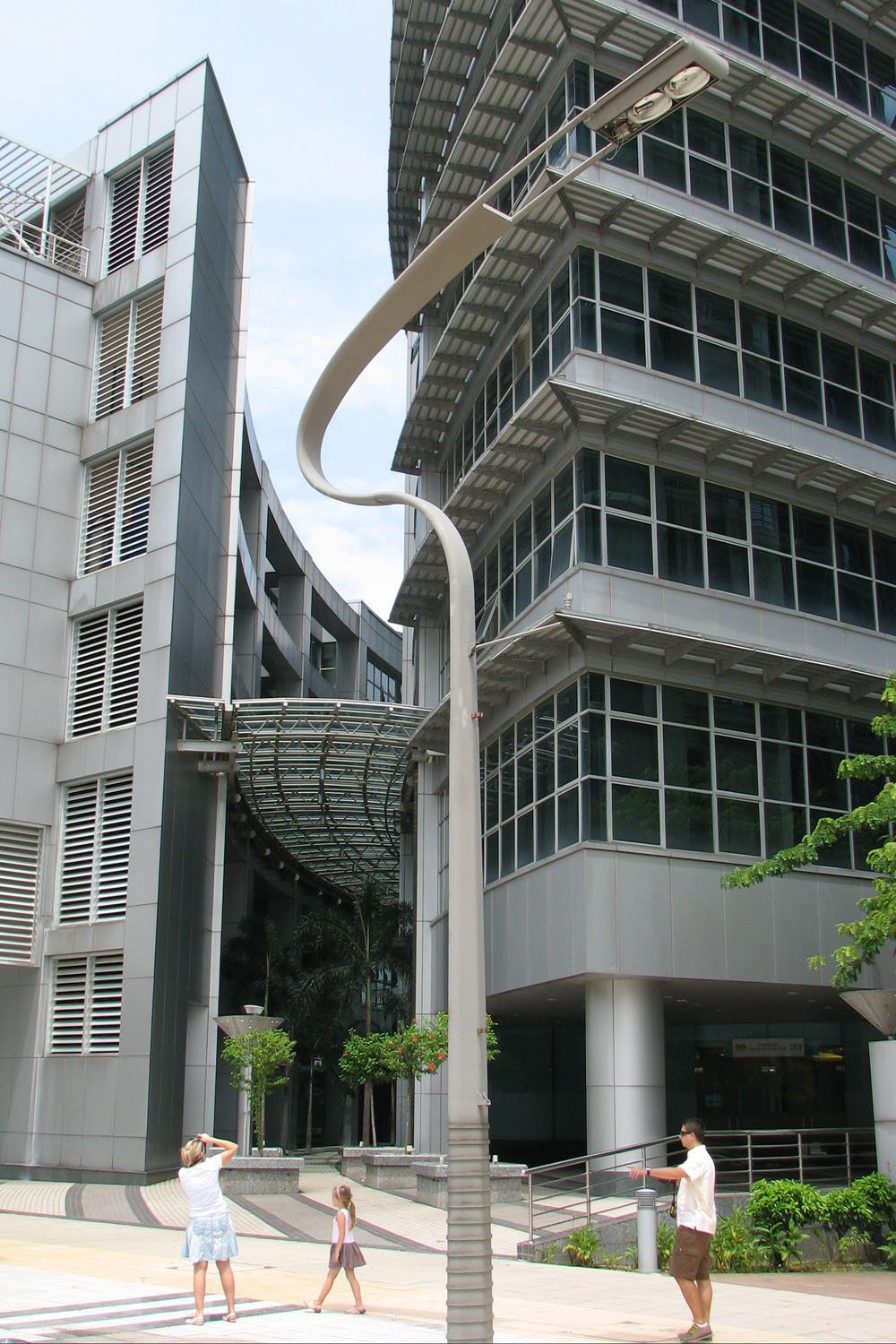
Ornamental civic street lighting

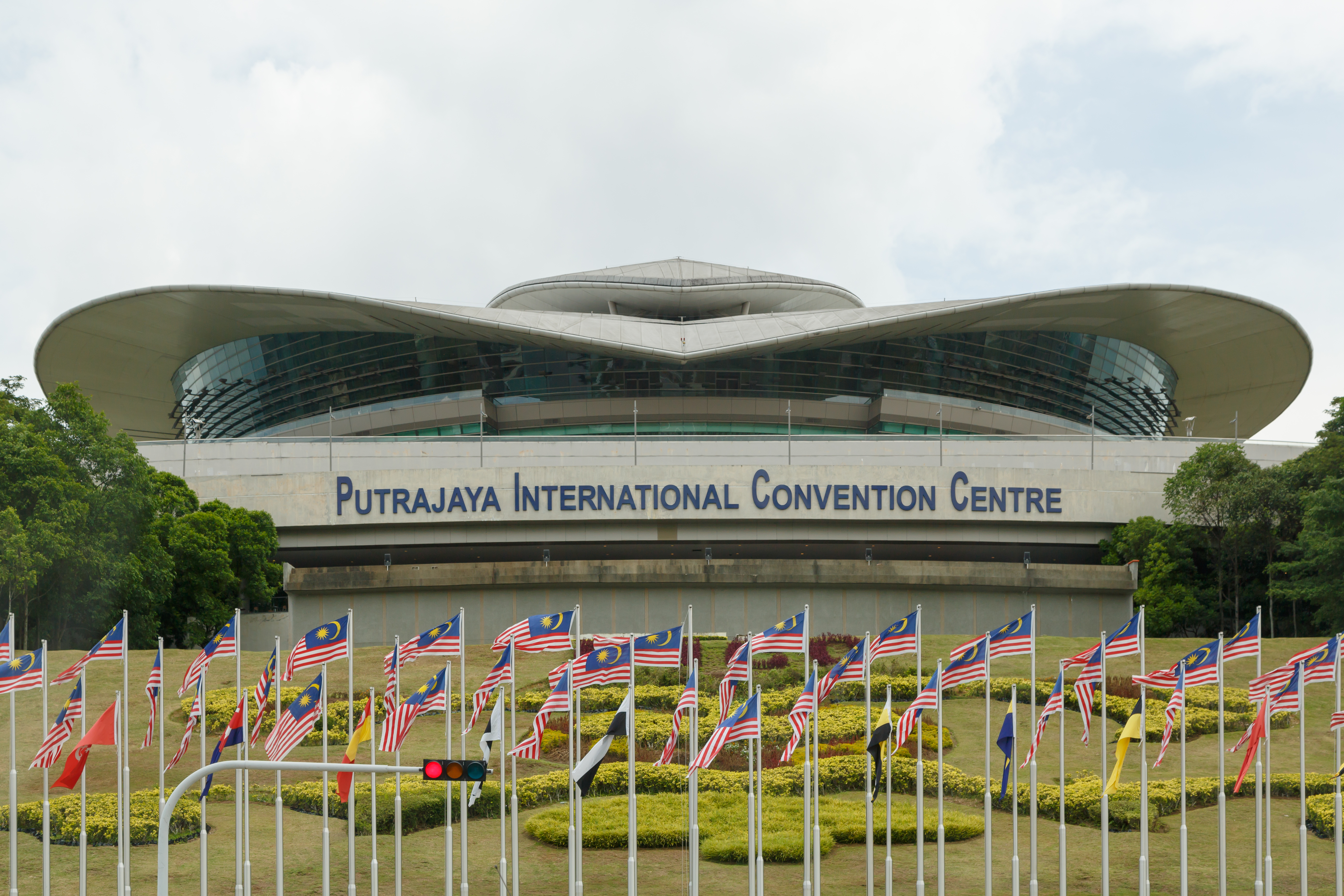
Putrajaya International Convention Centre

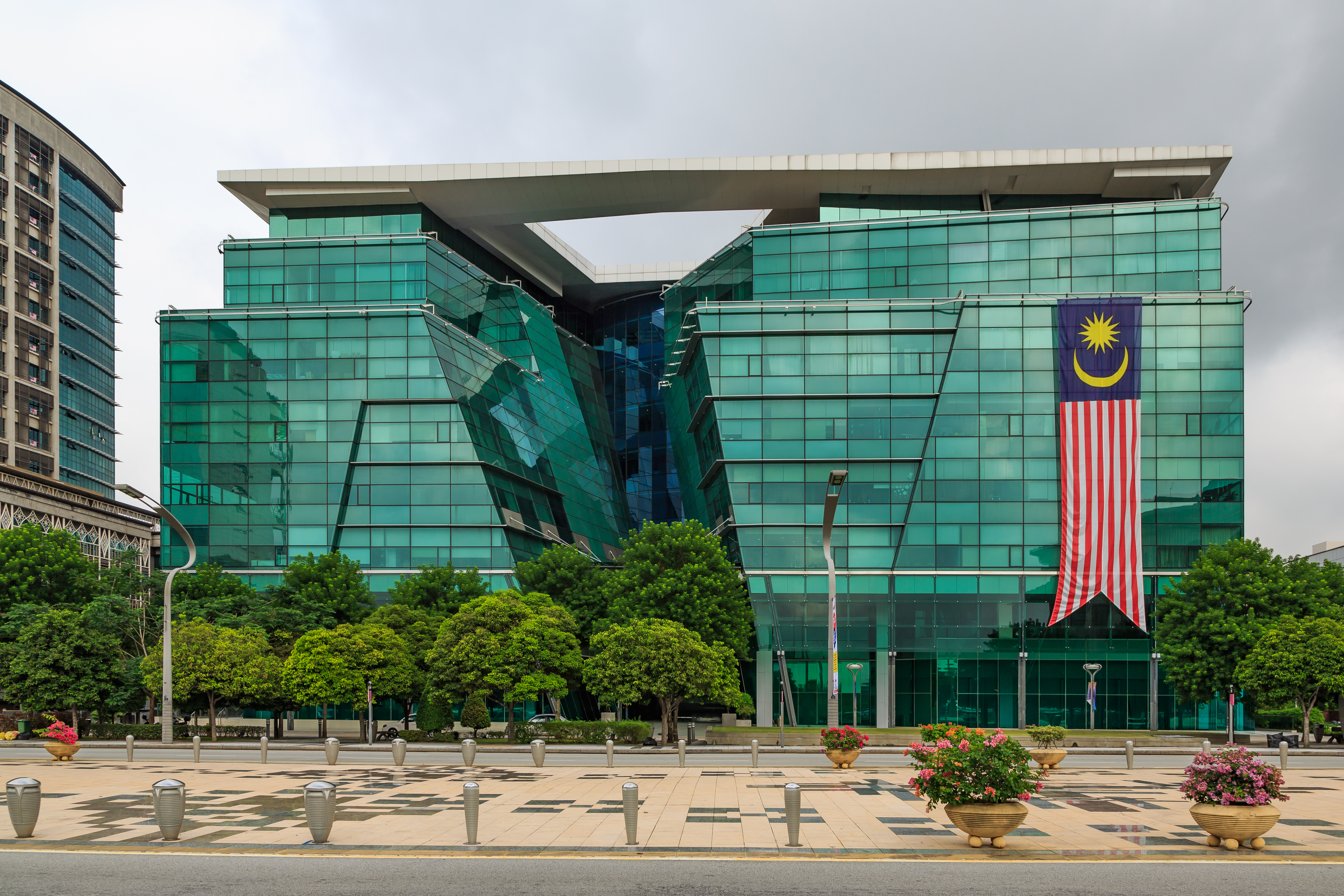
Ministry of Health Building

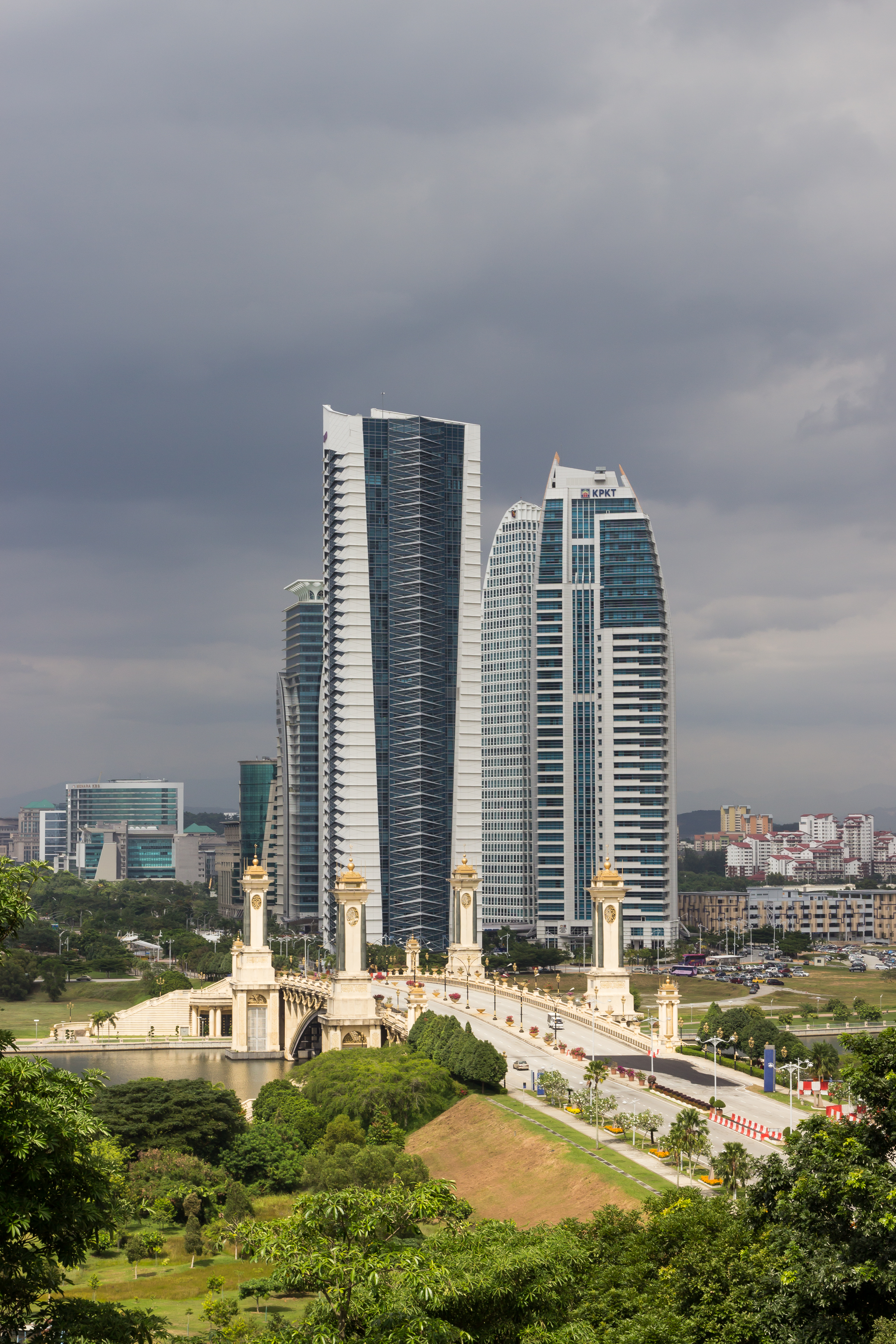
Government towers in Precinct 4

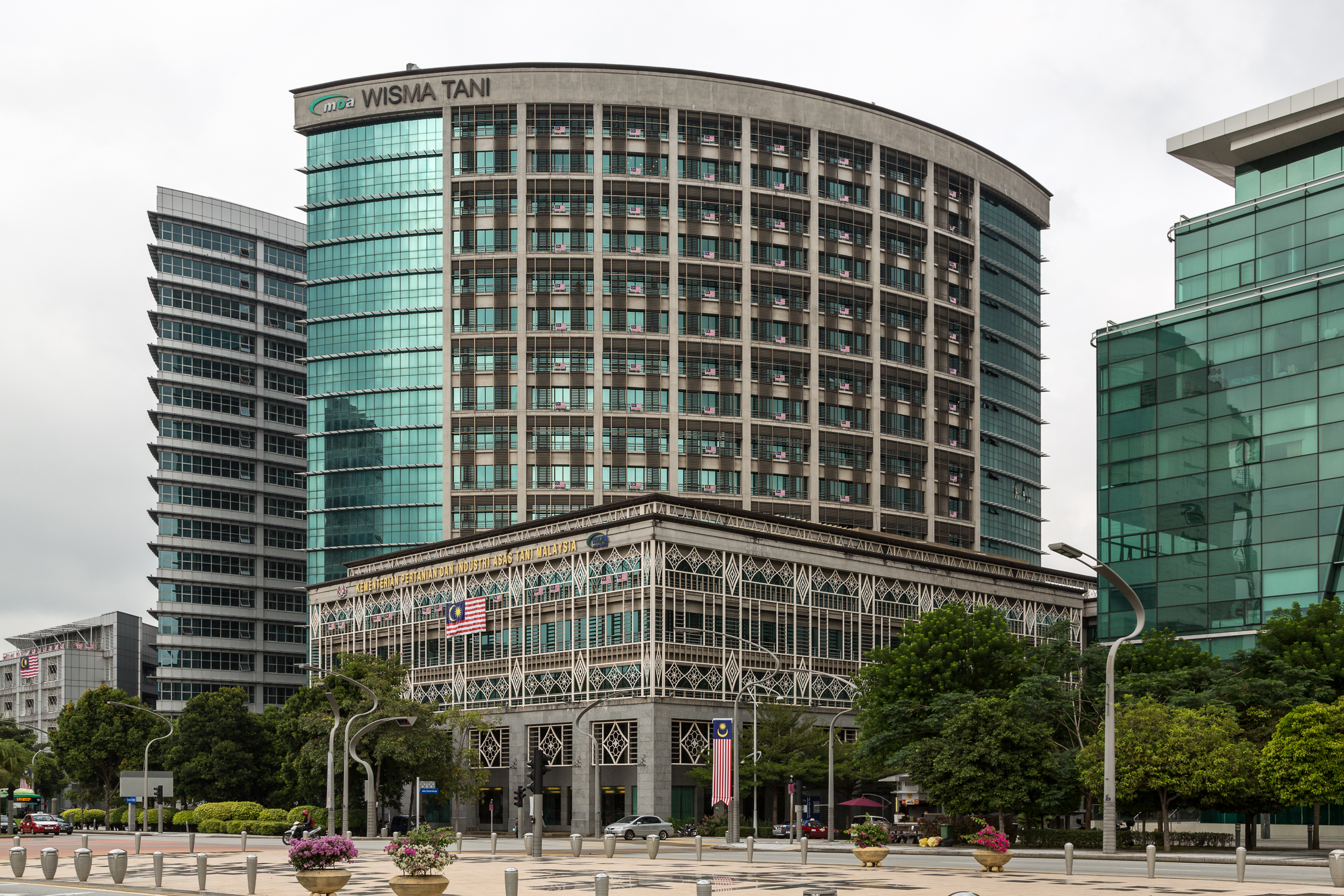
Ministry of Agriculture and Food Security Complex

== See also ==
- List of countries with multiple capitals
- Putrajaya ePrix
