= Seri Perdana Bridge =

Bridge in Putrajaya, Malaysia

Seri Perdana Bridge Jambatan Seri Perdana
- Coordinates: 2°56′29″N 101°41′22″E
- Carries: Motor vehicles, Pedestrians
- Crosses: Putrajaya Lake
- Locale: Lebuh Perdana Barat
- Official name: Seri Perdana Bridge
- Maintained by: Perbadanan Putrajaya

Characteristics
- Design: box girder bridge
- Total length: 370 m
- Width: --
- Longest span: --

History
- Designer: Perbadanan Putrajaya
- Constructed by: Perbadanan Putrajaya
- Opened: 1999

The Seri Perdana Bridge (Malay: Jambatan Seri Perdana) spans a length of 370 metres (1,210 ft) across the Putrajaya Lake in Putrajaya, Malaysia's federal administrative centre.

It is based on royal Islamic architectural design. This bridge contains eight unique balconies/rest areas for visitors.

The bridge is made up of seven central spans of 75m and two end spans of 55m. There are two separate carriageways over two twin-cell box girders. In the cross-section, the overall width between the extreme ends of two box girders is 23m. The footpath is flanked by railings and the road's median is lined by decorative street lighting.

== See also ==
- Transport in Malaysia
