= Putrajaya Lake =

Lake in Putrajaya, Malaysia

Putrajaya Lake Tasik Putrajaya
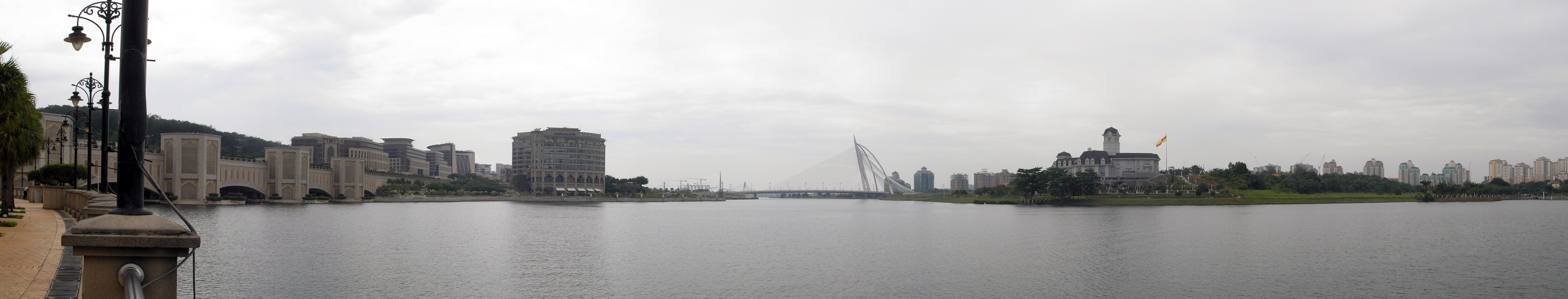

- Location within Malaysia
- Location: Putrajaya
- Coordinates: 2.941942°N 101.68911°E
- Type: Artificial lake
- Basin countries: Malaysia
- Surface area: 650 ha (1,600 acres)

The Putrajaya Lake (Malay: Tasik Putrajaya) is a lake located at the centre of Putrajaya, Malaysia, roughly 33 kilometres south of Kuala Lumpur. This 650-hectare man-made lake is designed to act as a natural cooling system for the city and also for recreation, fishing, water sports and water transport. The lake and its surrounding areas form Putrajaya’s most popular resource for informal recreation as a waterfront city.

The lake has an average depth of 6.60 metres and a catchment area of 50.9 square kilometres.

The well-known Putra Mosque (Pink Mosque), Tuanku Mizan Zainal Abidin Mosque (Iron Mosque), and Millennium Monument (Malaysia) are located on its shores.

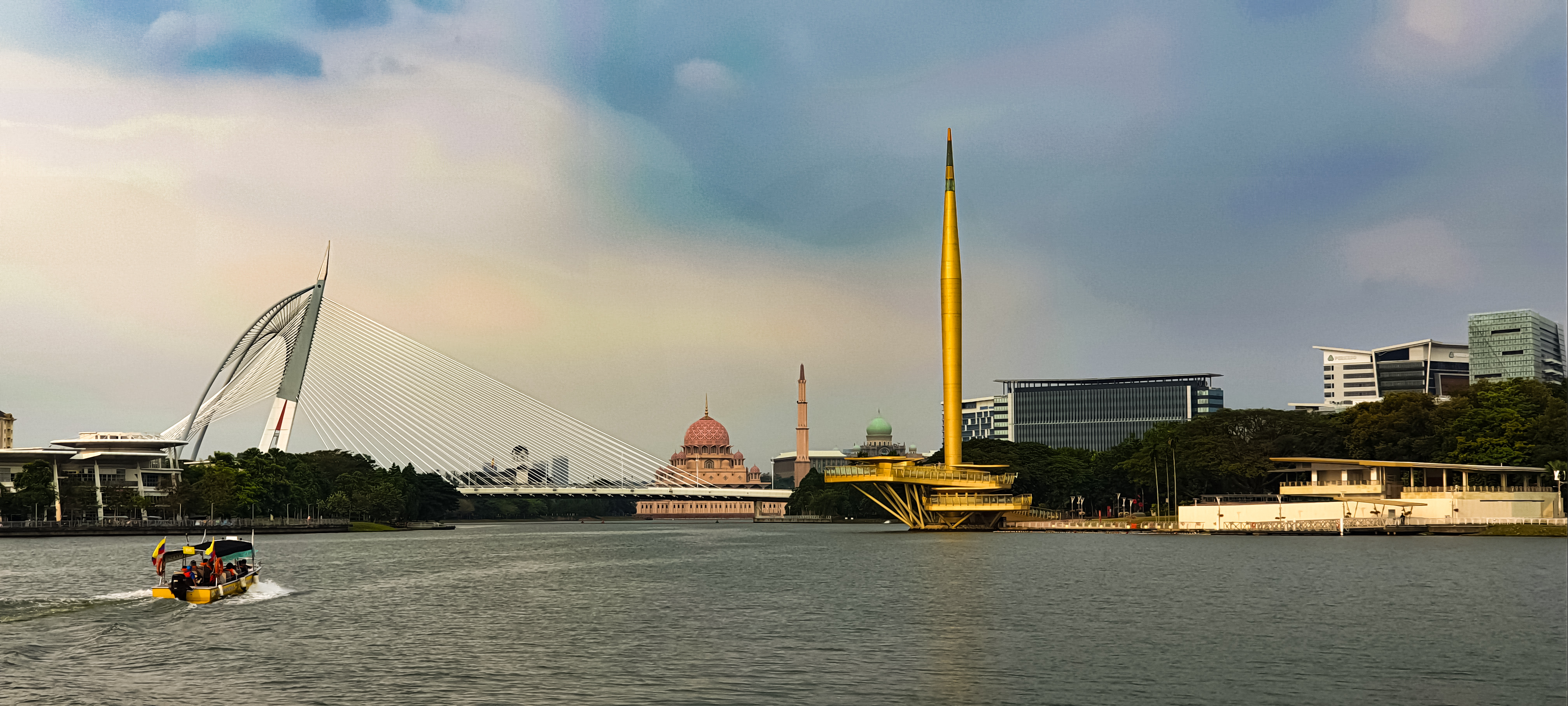
A panoramic view of Putrajaya Lake. Photo taken in February 2026.

== Activities ==
In 2017, the lake was one of the venues for the 29th Southeast Asian Games, when Malaysia served as host.

On 26 September 2004, the F1 Powerboat World Championship was held on this lake for the first time (third time hosted by Malaysia).

In 2005, Putrajaya hosted the Asian Canoeing Championships.

Between 17 and 19 May 2014, it hosted the second round of the Red Bull Air Race World Championship.

== See also ==
- Geography of Malaysia
