= Nadi Putra =

Malaysian city bus operator

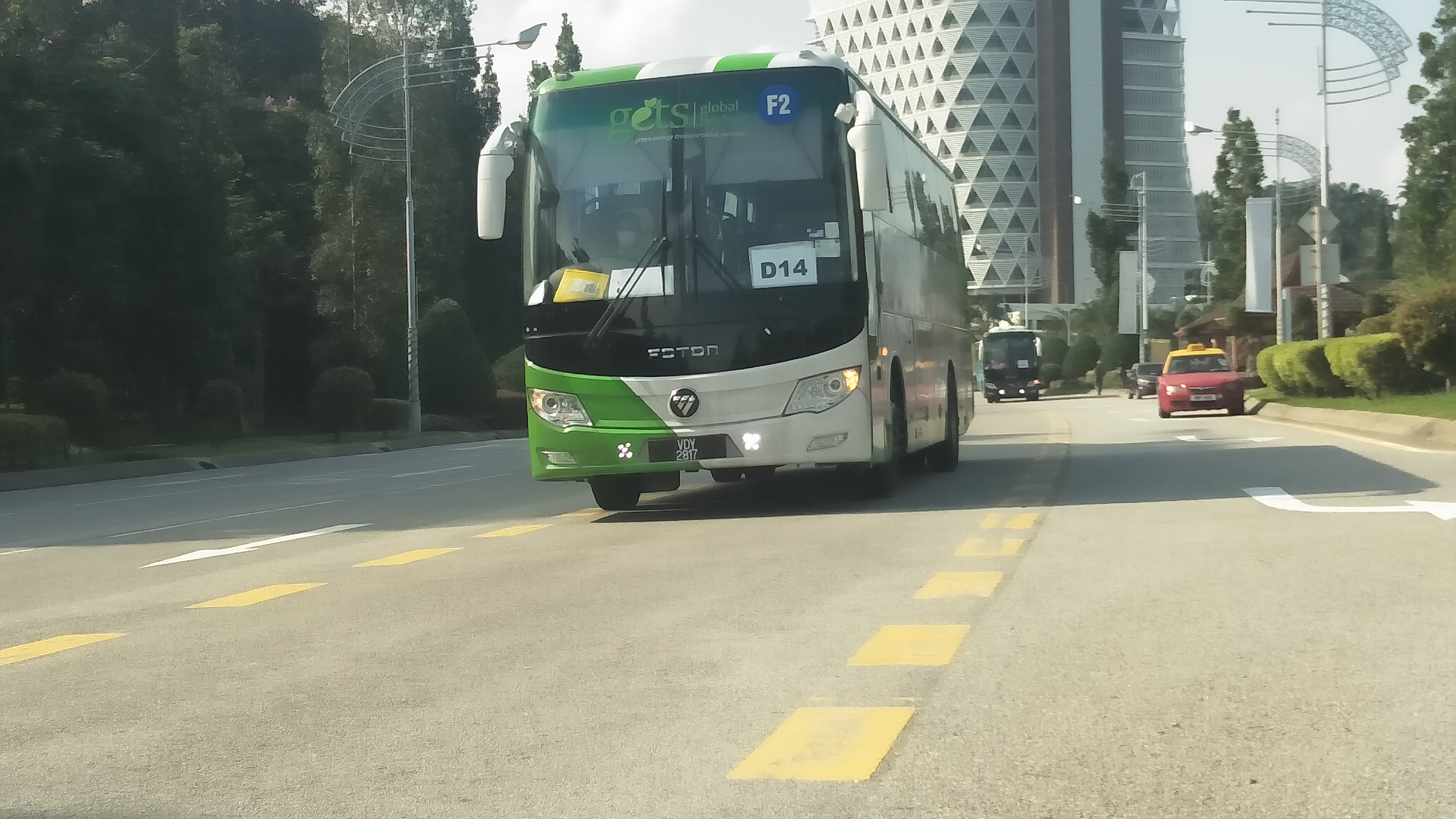
- Parent: Putrajaya Corporation (Perbadanan Putrajaya)
- Founded: July 1999
- Headquarters: Presint 9, Putrajaya, Malaysia
- Service area: Putrajaya
- Service type: Bus service
- Routes: Putrajaya
- Hubs: Putrajaya Sentral
- Fleet: Current Fleet: 30 Alexander Dennis Enviro200 buses (Current, Operated by Rapid Bus); Former fleets: 2008 Daewoo BV120MA Ci09 Badanbas NGV buses 16 Foton BJ6108U7LHD-R diesel buses 5 Scania NEDO EV electric buses
- Fuel type: Diesel, natural gas and electric
- Website: nadiputra.com.my

Pengangkutan Awam Putrajaya Travel & Tours Sdn Bhd dba Nadi Putra is the city bus operator in Putrajaya, the administrative capital of Malaysia, mainly serving Putrajaya city and nearby resident areas. Originally established as an agency of Putrajaya Corporation under the Ministry of Federal Territories, it was privatised in 2018.

Nadi Putra is now operated by Rapid KL, the largest city bus operator in Selangor and Kuala Lumpur.

== History ==
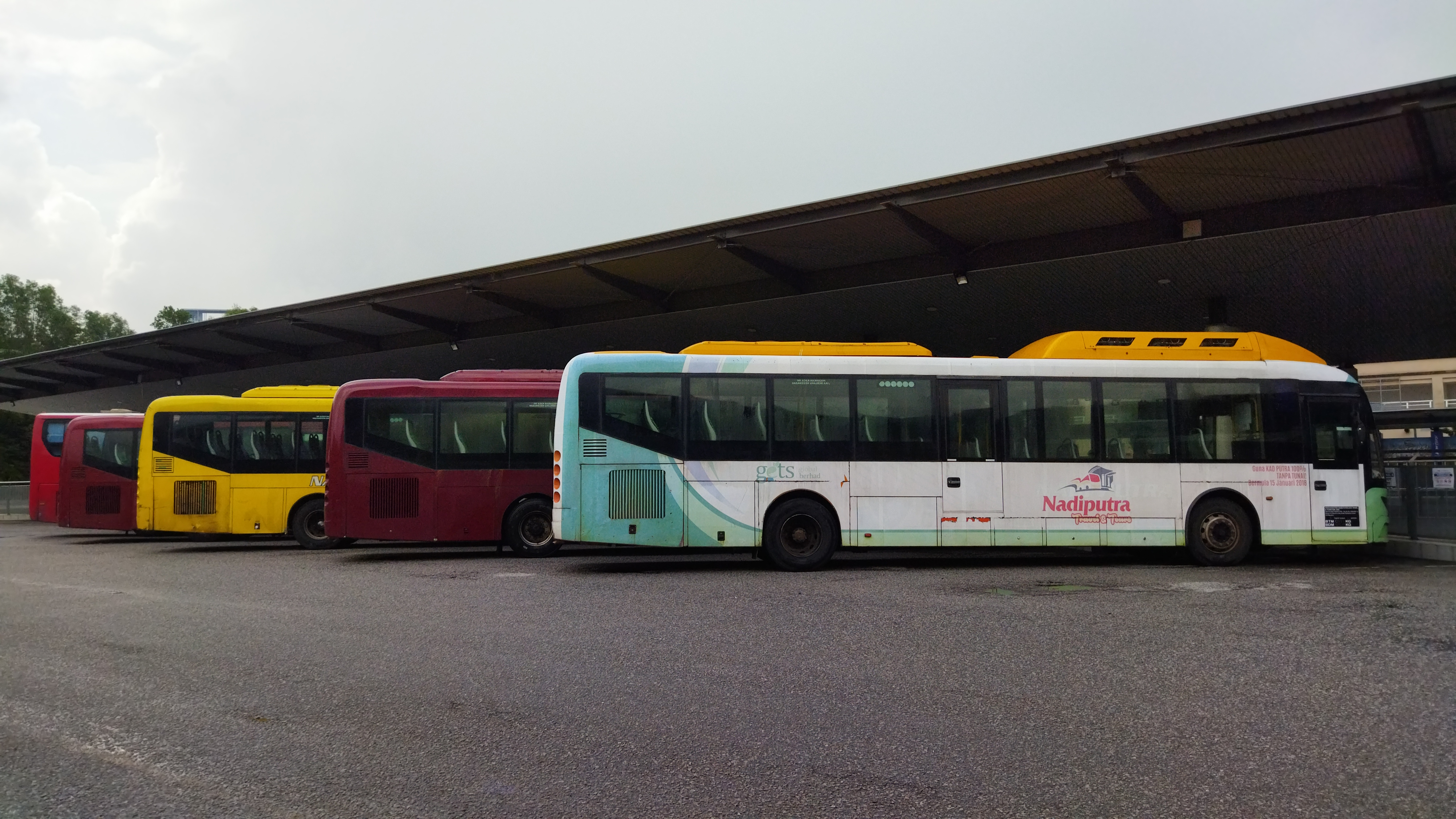
Nadi Putra buses at Putrajaya Sentral.

Established on 20 May 1999 with 14 routes covering almost all of the areas inside Putrajaya, Nadi Putra is the trade name of Putrajaya intra-city bus services and has been in operation since July 1999. The bus service was privatised and handed over to GETS Global Berhad in 2018.

Cashless payment was implemented in January 2018, using Kad Putra; the cards were discontinued two years later in favour of QR code payment.

All Nadi Putra bus services will be free of charge for Malaysian citizens effective 1 November 2020. Some new routes were also being planned at that time, under the Perikatan Nasional government. However, use of the Nadi Putra app is still mandatory for contact tracing and citizenship verification.

From 1 January 2023, Perbadanan Putrajaya revamped the Nadi Putra bus routes in Putrajaya, with the operations transferred to Rapid Bus (Rapid KL's primary bus network). All routes, except the P101 route, are no longer free of charge, with payment of RM1 per journey using Touch n' Go cards.

== Fleet ==
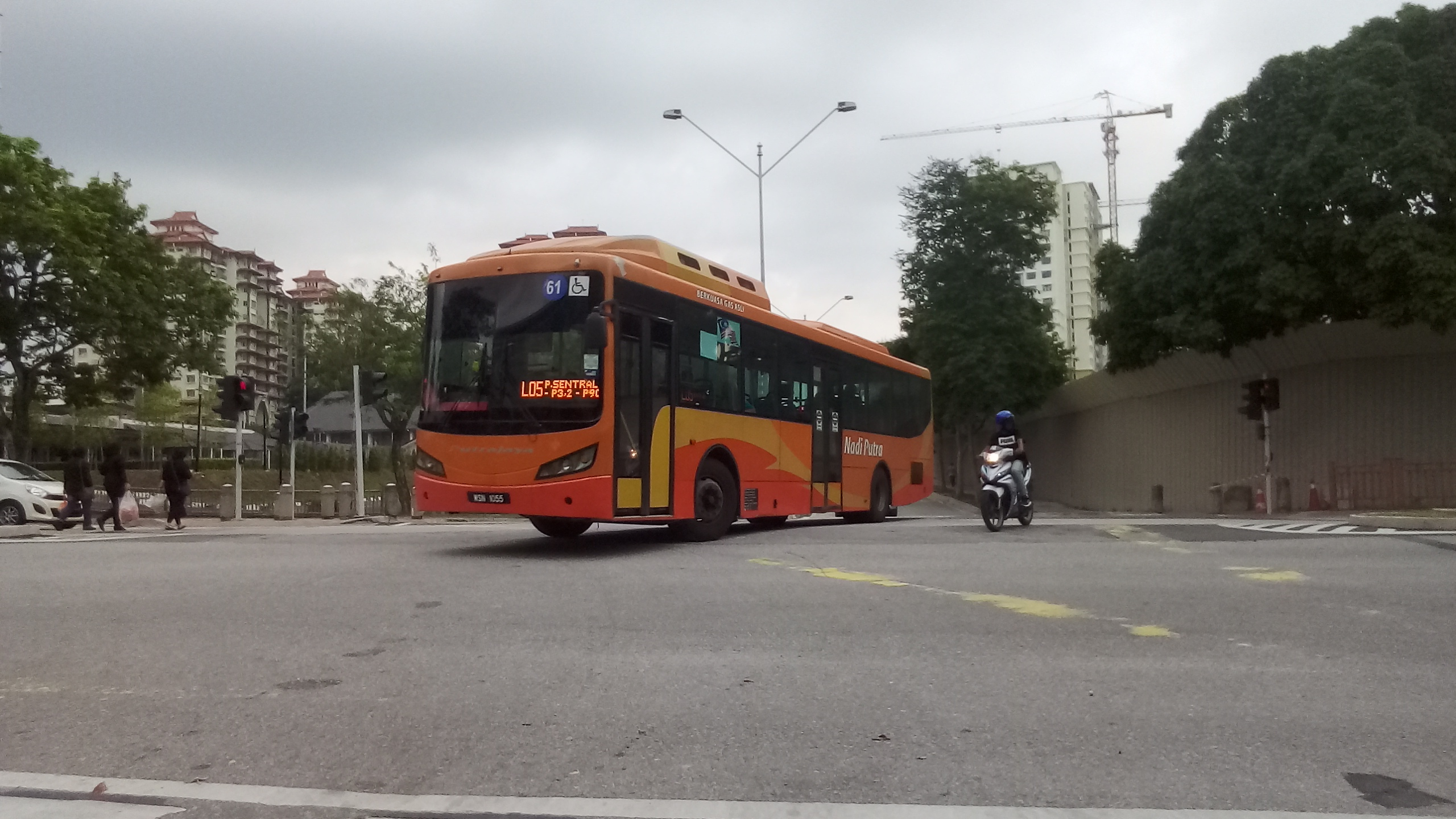
Badanbas-bodied Daewoo BV120MA on route L05.

Originally, Nadi Putra's fleet consisted of several numbers of Optare Metrorider, MAN SL 252 and Hino RK1J buses, however, in 2006, it was replaced with Badanbas-bodied South Korean Daewoo BV120MA NGV buses. The fleet then expanded to 176 buses in 2009 with the additional fleet and the introduction of the shorter Daewoo BS106 buses for routes with sharper corners. Majority of this fleet has been retired in 2019 due to high maintenance cost, however 8 BV120MA's has revived to improve frequencies.

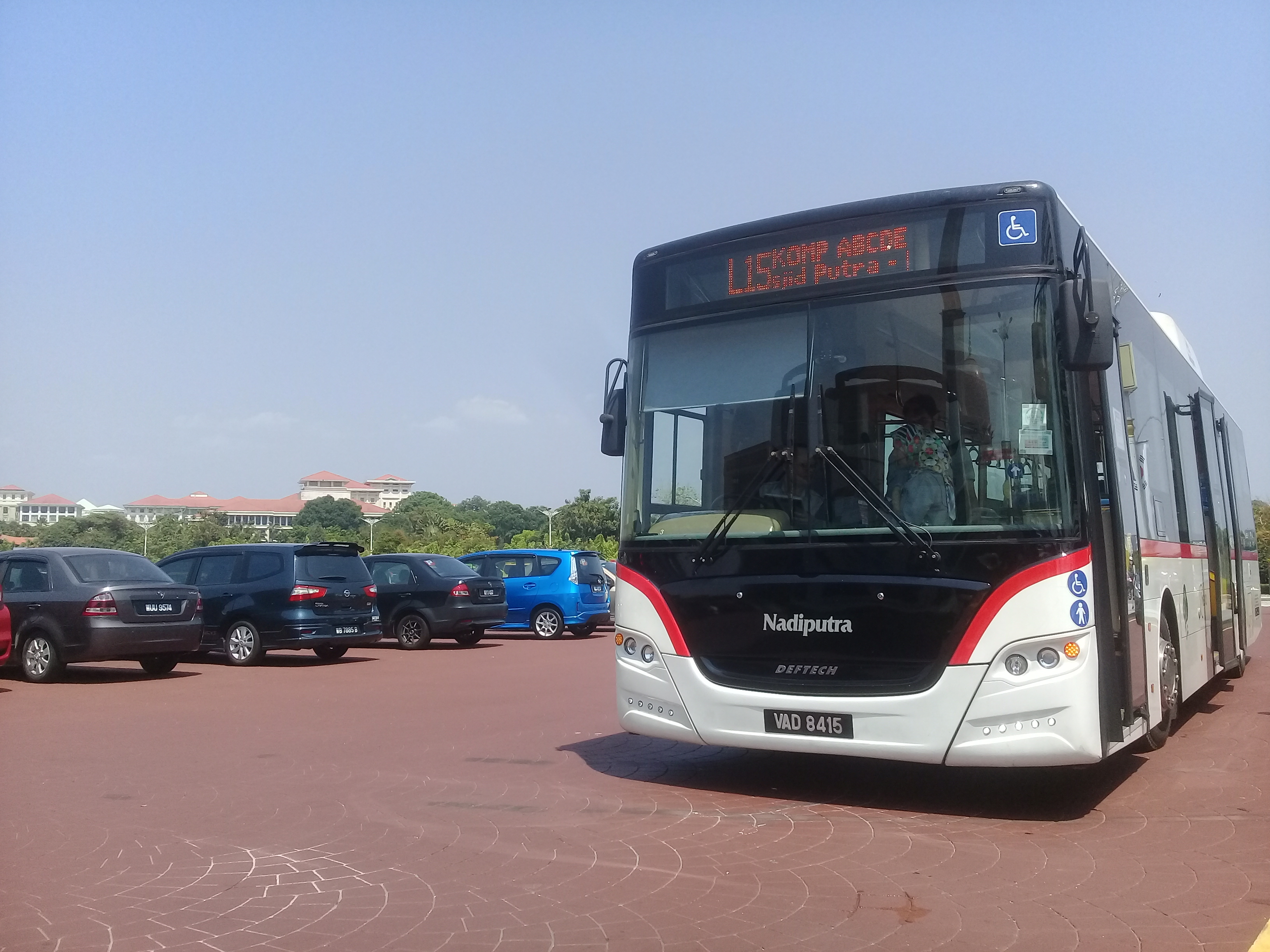
NEDO-EV supercapacitor electric buses on route L15. With a single 10-minute supercharge, this bus can run for up to 30 kilometres.

In 2015, a collaboration between Perbadanan Putrajaya and Japan's New Energy and Industrial Technology Development Organization (NEDO) was made to aim for green public transportation by 2025, which led to the introduction of 5 prototype electric supercapacitor buses, jointly built by Scania, Deftech and Toshiba. Nicknamed NEDO-EV buses, these buses can run up to 30 kilometres on a single 10-minute charge. This bus entered service in 2018, but it has been suspended in 2020 due to internal problems, and expereadinesstion to re-enter service is yet to be determined.

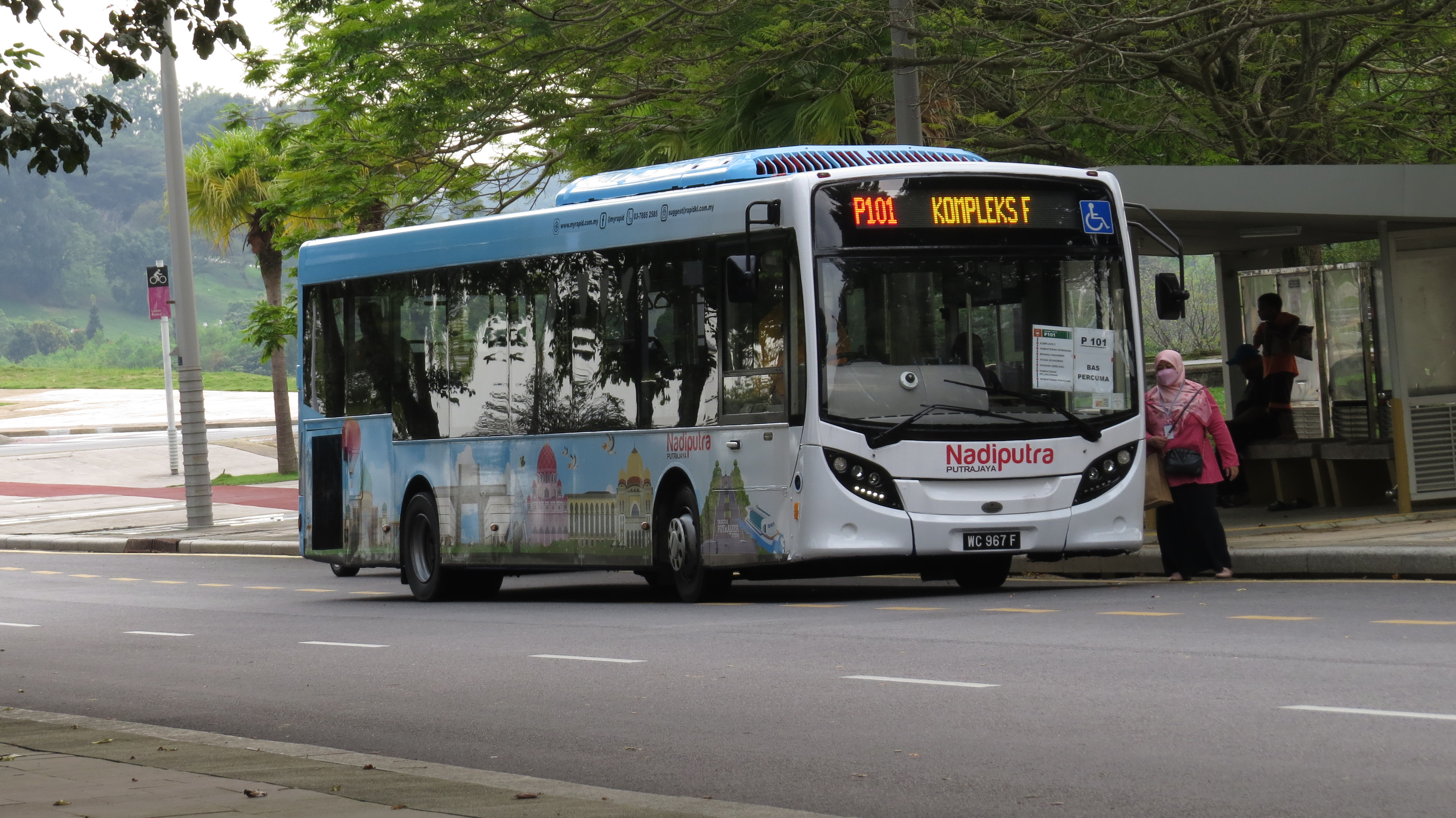
Nadi Putra with the new operator, Rapid KL.

With Rapid Bus becoming the new bus operator in Nadi Putra from January 2023, the revamped bus routes will use the Alexander Dennis Enviro200 bus fleet owned by Rapid Bus. The Foton buses were returned to Konsortium Bas Ekspres Semenanjung (KBES), while the Daewoo NGV buses were retired and abandoned.

== Criticism ==
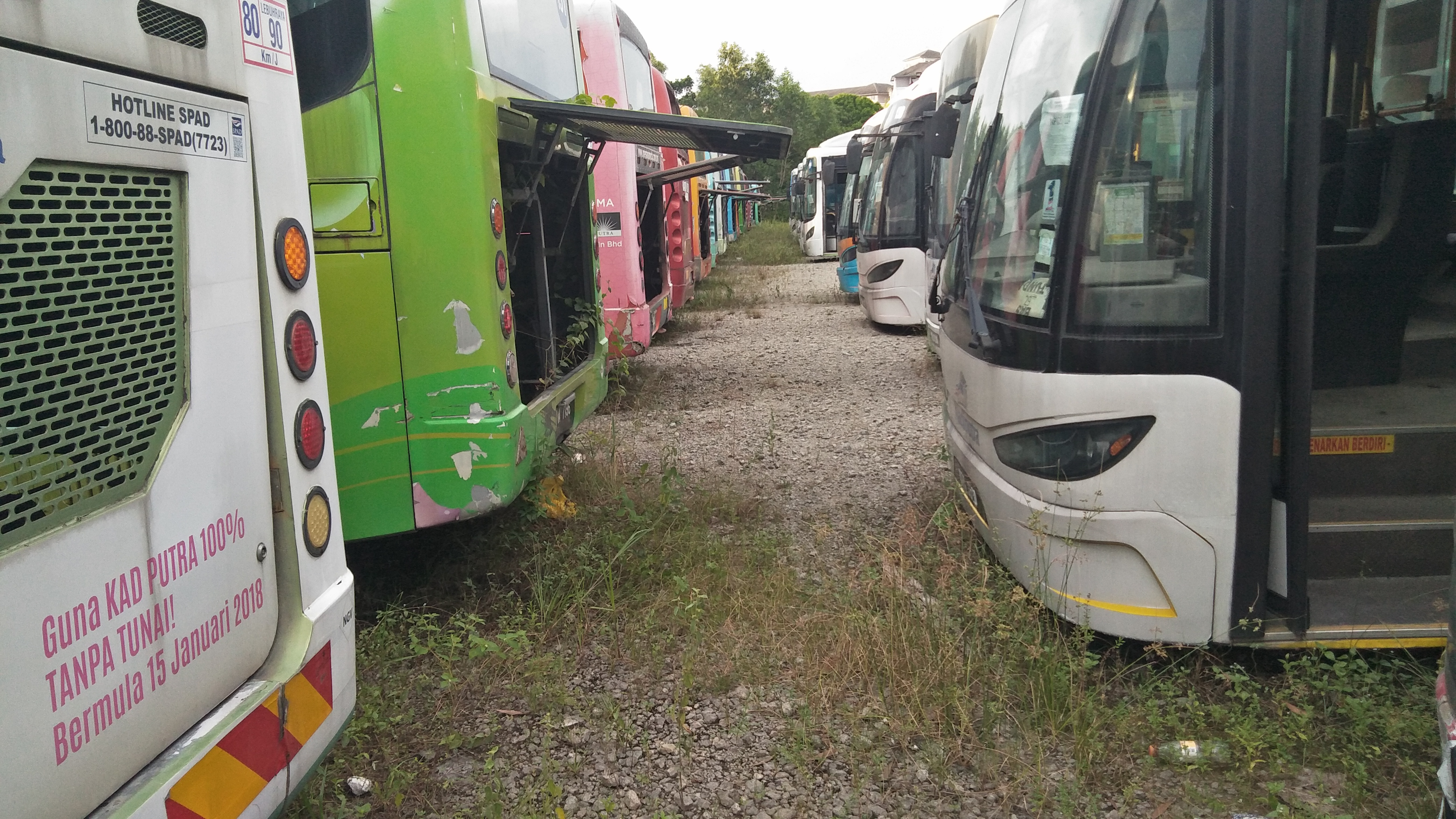
Abandoned buses at NadiPutra Depots due to poor maintenance, thus led to outcry for Putrajaya residents due to low frequencies.

Nadi Putra's service quality has reportedly declined since privatisation in 2018. Most of the buses are poorly maintained frequencies are breaking down, causing outrage among the residents and workers in Putrajaya, Cyberjaya and Bandar Saujana Putra.

Strikes broke out among Nadi Putra bus drivers in 2007 and 2018 due to shortage of buses available inforervice.

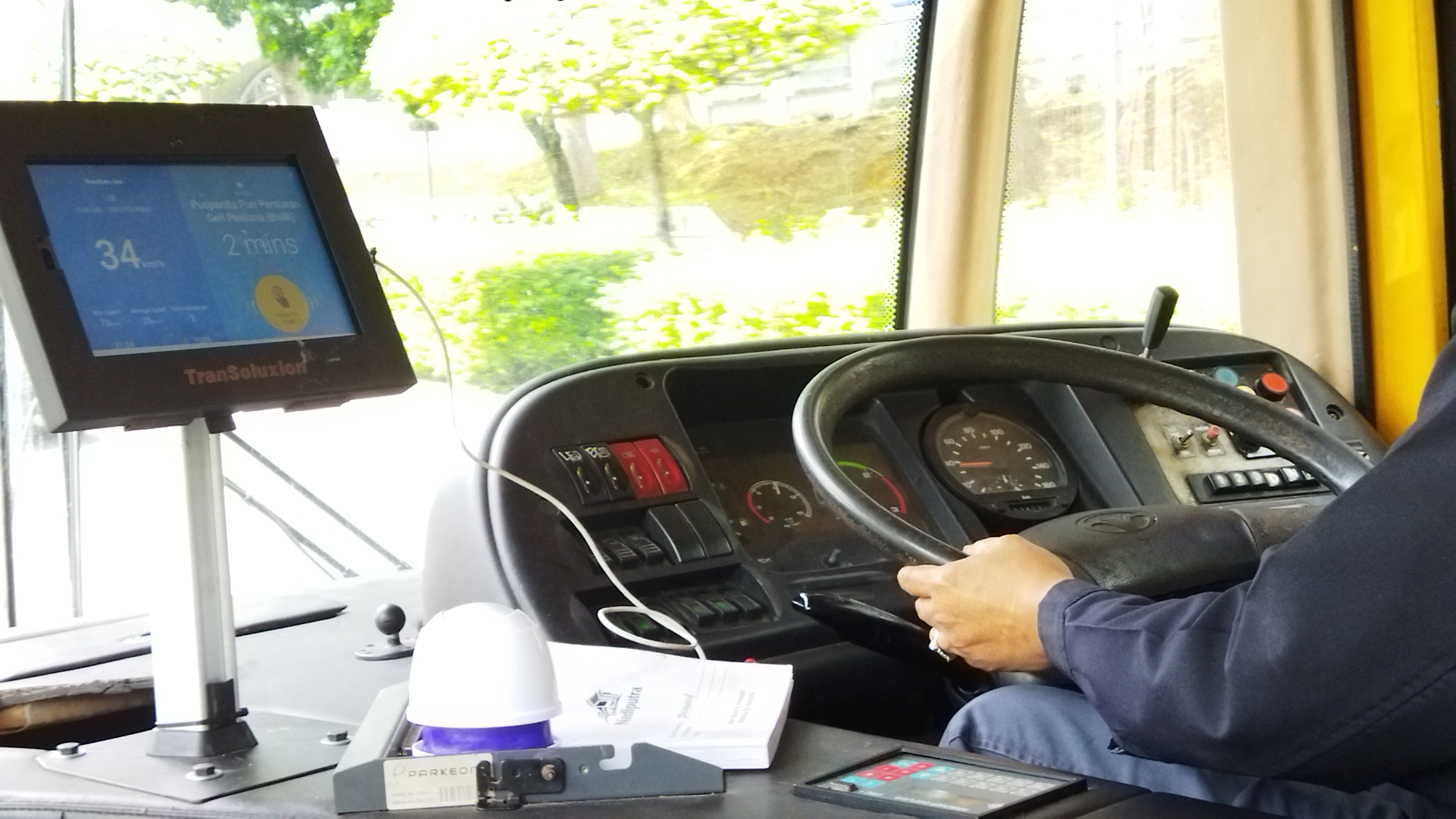
The view of the driver's seat on Nadi Putra bus, showing the systems that requires QR code for payments.

The implementation of cashless payment via Kad Putra instead of the more widely accepted Touch 'n Go in January 2018 led to outcry from commuters coming from outside Putrajaya, as the cards and reloading services were only available at the Putrajaya/Cyberjaya ERL station, the station being Nadi Putra's hub. The cards were abolished in January 2020, and were replaced by QR code mobile applications.

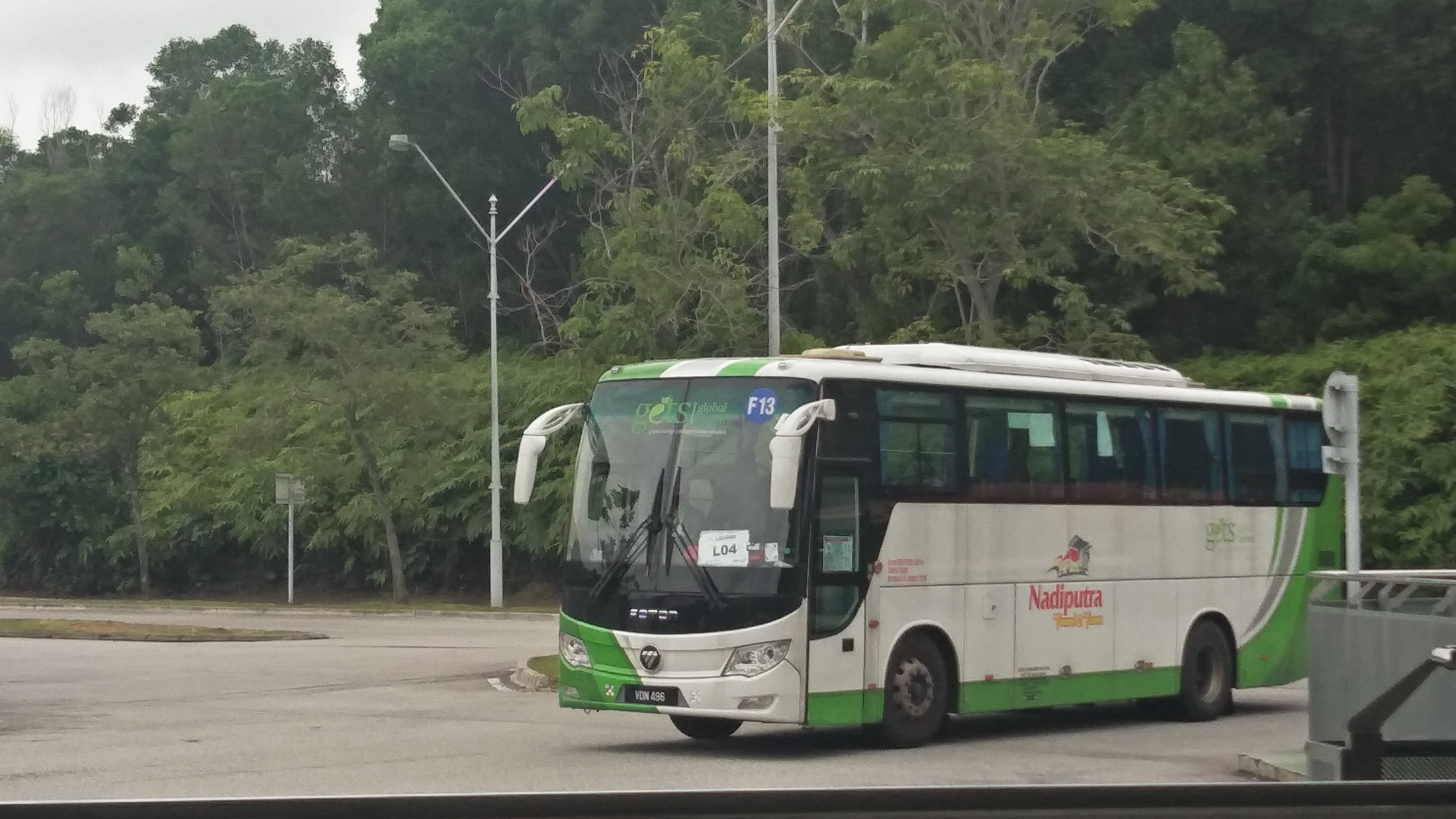
Foton BJ6108U7LHD-R coach buses which replaced the NGV buses.

The result of poorly maintained NGV buses was that the bus was abandoned and replaced by Foton BJ6108U7LHD-R coach buses from Konsortium Bas Ekspres Semenanjung (KBES), which was unpractical for city-buses, thus led to a failure of having sustainable city buses. This also led to some of the routes being terminated, or transferred to another companies.

== Services ==
This is the list of active Nadi Putra routes as of 1 January 2023.

=== Revamped Routes (P) ===
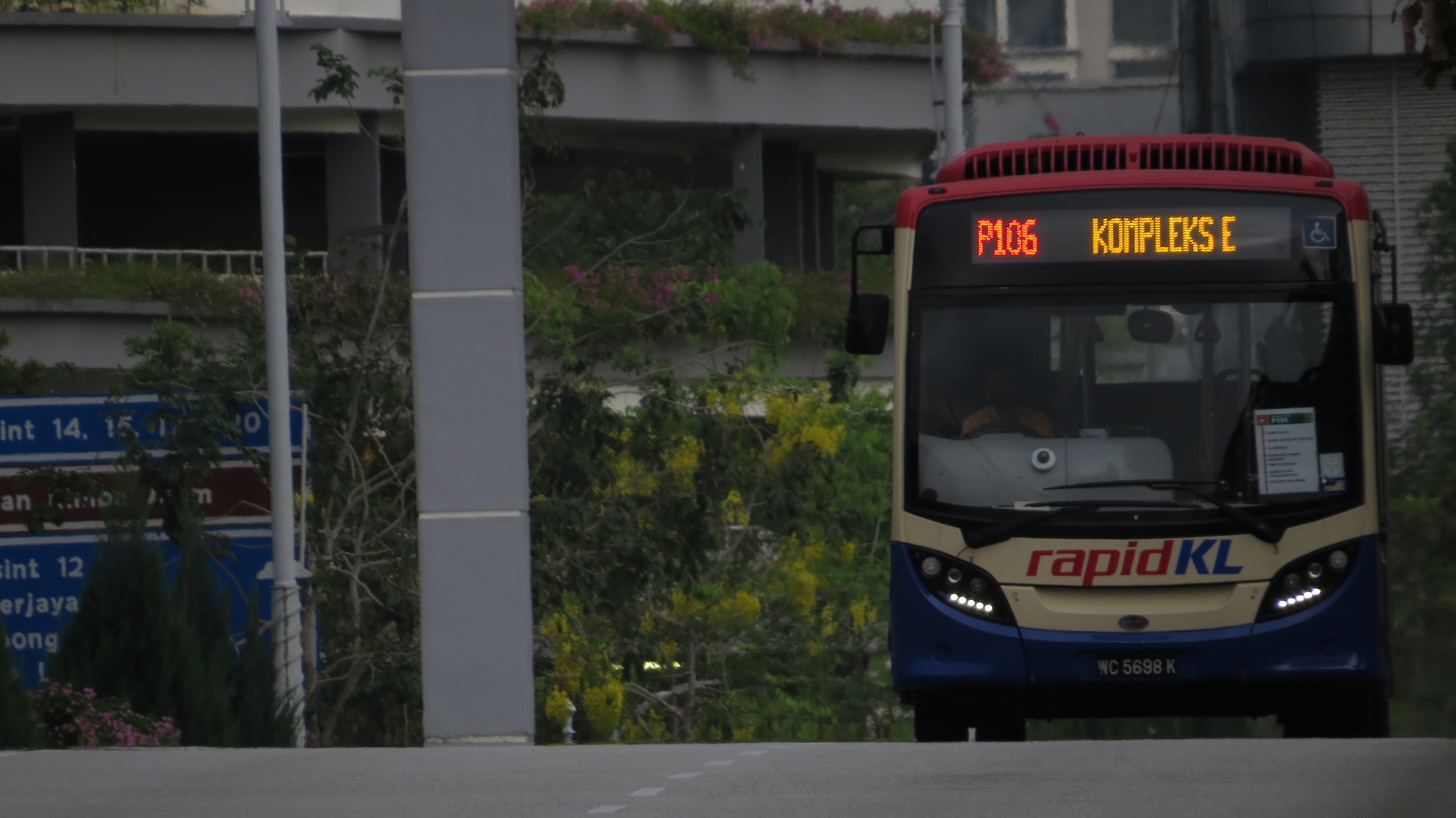
Revamped routes made by Perbadanan Putrajaya.

The new routes were revamped by Perbadanan Putrajaya, and begin operation from 1 January 2023, 6.30am to 8.00pm daily. All routes except for P101 are capped at RM1 per journey.

Bus route for the Nadiputra as of 2023 January.

Route	! Destination
P101	Kompleks F - Kompleks ABCDE - Presint 2,3,4 - Dataran Gemilang - Kementerian Pengajian Tinggi (Presint 5)
P102	Kompleks ABCDE - Presint 10 - Presint 11
P103	Kompleks ABCDE - Alamanda - Presint 14 - Presint 15
P104	Dataran Gemilang - Presint 6 - PICC - Presint 5
P105	Dataran Gemilang - Presint 2,3,4 - Ayer@8 - Presint 8 - Kompleks ABCDE
P106	Kompleks ABCDE - Alamanda - Presint 16 - Presint 17 - Presint 18 - Kementerian Belia dan Sukan (Presint 4)
P108	Putrajaya Sentral - Jalan P9B - Jalan P9G - Kompleks ABCDE

=== Upcoming Routes ===
Route	Destination
P109	Putrajaya Sentral - Presint 2 - Wisma Putra
P110	Putrajaya Sentral - Jalan P9 - Kompleks ABCDE
P111	Putrajaya Sentral - Dataran Gemilang - Presint 5
P112	Putrajaya Sentral - Dataran Gemilang - Presint 2,3,4 - Dataran Putra - Kompleks ABCDE

=== Former Routes ===
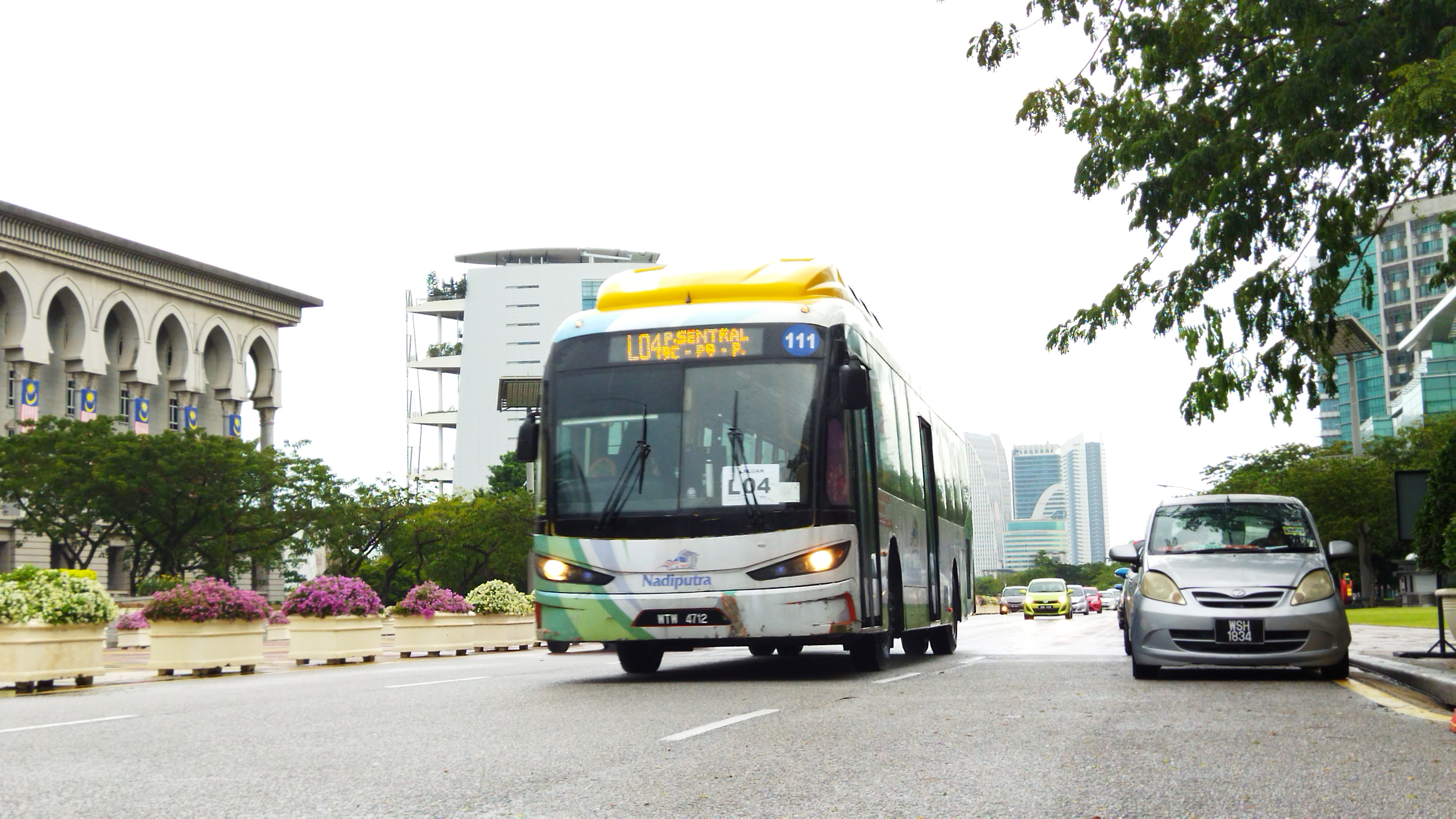
Local routes served between residents to station terminals and cities.

These are the former routes from the original Nadi Putra bus operator (Pengangkutan Awam Putrajaya Travel & Tours Sdn Bhd). The fare for non-citizen is RM1.50 per journey.

==== Local Routes (L) ====
All routes starts from Putrajaya Sentral.

Line	Routes
L02	Putrajaya Sentral - Presint 9 - Presint 8 - Kompleks ABCDE - Alamanda - Presint 14 - Presint 15
L03	Putrajaya Sentral - Presint 9 - Ayer@8 - Presint 2, 3 - Presint 18 - Wisma Putra
L04	Putrajaya Sentral - Presint 9 - Presint 2, 3, 4 - Dataran Gemilang - PICC - Presint 5 - Presint 6
L05	Putrajaya Sentral - Presint 9 - Presint 8 - Presint 2, 3 - Presint 18 - Presint 17 - Presint 16 - Alamanda - Kompleks ABCDE - Presint 14
L07	Putrajaya Sentral - Presint 9 - Presint 11 - Presint 10 - Kompleks ABCDE - Alamanda
L08	Putrajaya Sentral - Presint 9 - Presint 11 - Presint 10 - Presint 8 - Presint 2, 3, 4 - Dataran Gemilang
L15	Putrajaya Sentral - Dataran Gemilang - Presint 2, 3, 4 - Kompleks ABCDE

==== Direct routes (D) ====
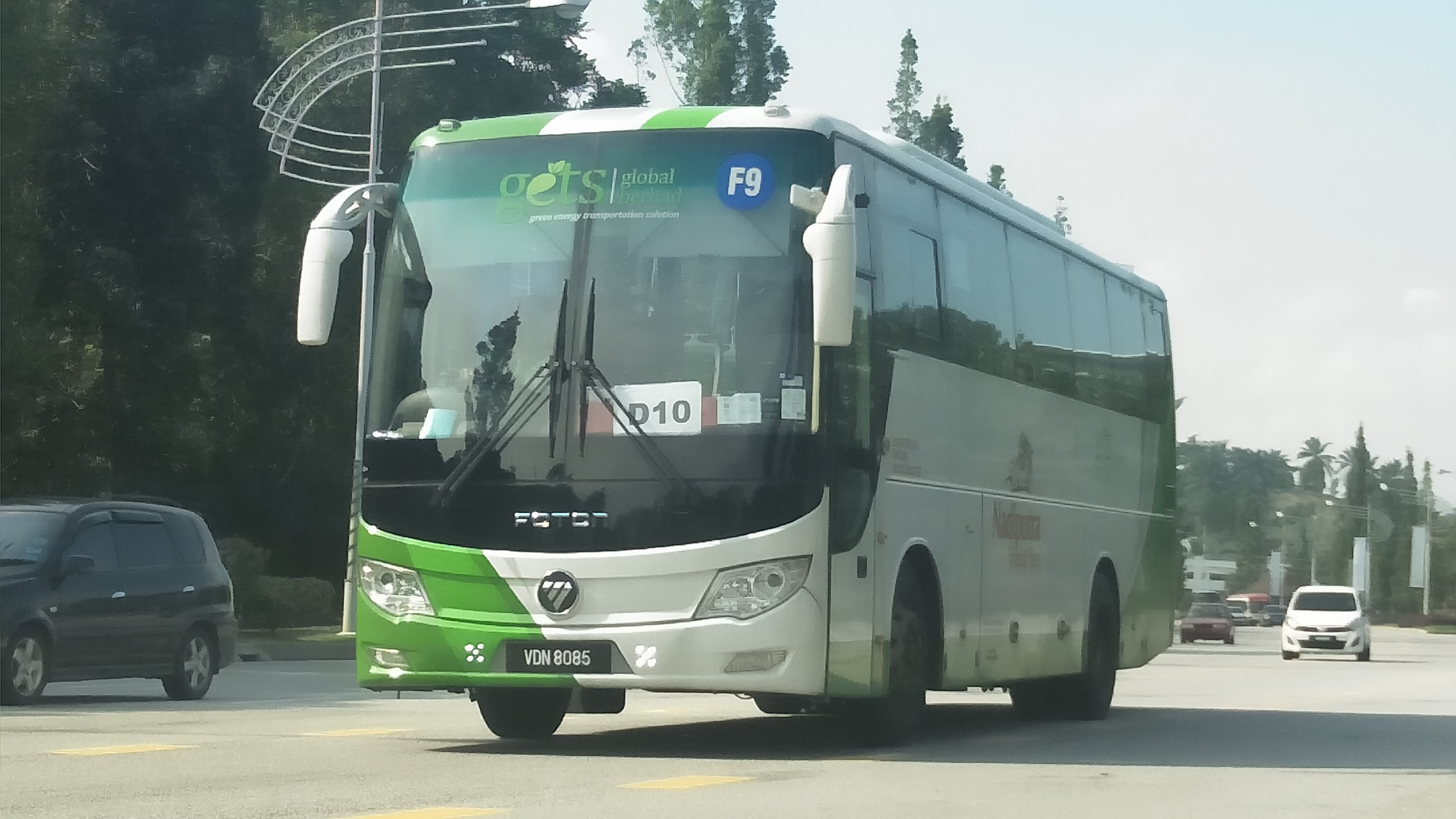
Direct routes serve government areas directly to residential areas.

These routes usually intended for government employees staying at nearby residential areas while working at government areas, provide direct services to residential areas. Similar to BET services in Klang Valley, this service operates during rush hours, weekdays only. Odd route numbers start from the starting point and operate in the morning rush hour, even route numbers start from Kompleks ABCDE or Dataran Gemilang in the evening rush hour.

Route	Destination
D03/D04	Jalan P9F - Jalan P9C/1 - Jalan P8H - Jalan Presint 8 - Kompleks ABCDE
D05/D06	Jalan P9F - Jalan P9C/1 - P8H (Ayer@8) - Presint 2, 3, 4 - Dataran Gemilang
D09/D10	Presint 11 - Kompleks ABCDE via Persiaran Utara/Lebuh Perdana Barat
D11/D12	Presint 11 - Dataran Gemilang via Lebuh Sentosa and Lebuh Wawasan
D13/D14	Presint 14 - Presint 15 - Kompleks ABCDE - Presint 2, 3, 4 - Dataran Gemilang
S01+D01/D02	Putrajaya Sentral - Jalan P9 (Putra Harmoni) - Kompleks ABCDE via Lebuh Perdana Barat
S02	Putrajaya Sentral - Dataran Gemilang - Presint 4,5 (Kementerian Pelancongan) via Lebuh Sentosa
P102A	Presint 11 - Presint 2,3,4 - Dataran Gemilang

==== Inactive routes ====
This is the list of discontinued bus routes from the original Nadi Putra bus operator due to bus shortage or low demand.

Line	Routes	Status
P107 ^{a}	Putrajaya Sentral - Jalan P9C/1 - Jalan P9F - Presint 2, 3, 4 - Kementerian Belia dan Sukan (Presint 4)	Terminated
L10	Putrajaya Sentral - Presint 5 - Presint 6 - Dataran Gemilang - Presint 4 - Presint 18 - Presint 16 - Alamanda - Kompleks ABCDE	Terminated
N01	Putrajaya Sentral - Presint 9 - Presint 11 - Presint 10 - Presint 8 - Ayer@8	Terminated
N02	Putrajaya Sentral - Presint 9 - Kompleks ABCDE - Alamanda - Presint 14 - Presint 15	Terminated
N03	Putrajaya Sentral - Presint 9 - Presint 2, 3 - Presint 18 - Presint 16 - Presint 17	Terminated
N04	Putrajaya Sentral - Presint 9 - Presint 2, 3, 4 - Presint 5 - Presint 6	Terminated
N05	P&R Presint 14 - Alamanda - Presint 16 - Presint 17 - Presint 18 - Presint 4 - Dataran Gemilang - Presint 5 - Presint 6	Terminated
N06	P&R Presint 14 - Presint 15 - Alamanda - Presint 16	Terminated
N07	P&R Presint 14 - Presint 15 - Alamanda - Kompleks ABCDE - Presint 10 - Presint 11	Terminated
N08	P&R Presint 14 - Alamanda - Kompleks ABCDE - Presint 9 - Ayer@8 - Presint 8	Terminated
D07/D08	Presint 9 - P9B - P9G - Kompleks ABCDE via Lebuh Perdana Barat	Terminated
D15/D16	Presint 5 - Kompleks ABCDE via Lebuh Sentosa and Lebuh Perdana Barat	Terminated
D17/D18	Presint 17 - Presint 16 - Kompleks ABCDE via Persiaran Timur and Lebuh Perdana Timur	Terminated
D19/D20	Presint 17 - Presint 18 - Presint 2,3,4 - Dataran Gemilang	Terminated
D21/D22	Desa Pinggiran Putra - Presint 5 - Dataran Gemilang - Presint 4,3,2 via Persiara Selatan	Terminated
D23/D24	Desa Pinggiran Putra - Kompleks ABCDE via Persiaran Timur	Terminated
D25/D26	Putrajaya Sentral - P2,3,4 - Wisma Putra via Lebuh Wawasan	Terminated
D27/D28	Jalan P9F - Jalan P9C/1 - Jalan P8H (Ayer@8) - Presint 2,3,4 - Dataran Gemilang	Terminated
D29	Putrajaya Sentral - Presint 9 - Presint 11 via Lebuh Sentosa	Terminated
D30	Alamanda - Kompleks ABCDE - Presint 2,3,4 - Dataran Gemilang	Terminated
D31/D32	Presint 18 - Kompleks ABCDE via Lebuh Perdana Selatan	Terminated
D33/D34	Presint 15 - Presint 14 - Kompleks ABCDE via Lebuh Perdana Timur	Terminated
D35/D36	Jalan P9B - Jalan P9G - Presint 2,3,4 - Dataran Gemilang	Terminated
500	Putrajaya Sentral - Lebuh Pudu bus hub (via Maju Expressway)	Operations transferred to KR Travel and Tours
502	Serdang KTM station - Putrajaya Sentral	Operations transferred to KR Travel and Tours
520	The Arc, Cyberjaya - Putrajaya Sentral	Abandoned
521	UiTM Dengkil - Putrajaya Sentral	Abandoned
T520	Cyberjaya Street Mall - Lim Kok Wing University	Abandoned
T521	Putrajaya Sentral - Cyber Heights - Cyberia	Abandoned
T760	KJ37 SP31 Putra Heights LRT station - Bandar Saujana Putra	Abandoned
BET13	Putrajaya Sentral - Serdang KTM station	Terminated
BET15	Putrajaya Sentral - Bandar Saujana Putra	Terminated
IOI	Serdang KTM station - IOI City Mall	Terminated
IOI	Kajang MRT/KTM station - IOI City Mall	Terminated

===== School routes (terminated) =====
Operating hours start from 6.30am to 4.00pm

====== Morning ======
- SK Putrajaya Presint 11(1) - Putra Damai - SK Putrajaya Presint 11(1) - Putrajaya Sentral
- SK Putrajaya Presint 11(1) - P10 - SK Putrajaya Presint 11(1) - Putrajaya Sentral
- SK Putrajaya Presint 11(1) - Putra Damai

====== Afternoon ======
- SK Putrajaya Presint 11(1) - P8 - P9
- SK Putrajaya Presint 8(1) - P8 - P9
- P&R P14 - SK Putrajaya Presint 11(2)

====== Fridays ======
- SK Putrajaya Presint 11(2) - Masjid P11A

== See also ==
- Prasarana Malaysia Berhad
  - Rapid Bus Sdn Bhd
    - Rapid KL
      - B1 BRT Sunway Line
      - B2 BRT Federal Line
    - Rapid Penang
    - Rapid Kuantan
- Land Public Transport Agency
- Public transport in Kuala Lumpur
- Buses in Kuala Lumpur
- List of bus routes in Kuala Lumpur
- Perbadanan Putrajaya
- Putrajaya Sentral

== Notes ==
1. P107 bus route began operation on 16 January 2023 until the MRT feeder buses T510 and T511 take over this bus route in 16 March 2023.
