= BRT Federal Line =

- B2
- The proposed BRT station and busway along the Federal Highway at Asia Jaya

Overview
- Native name: Laluan BRT Persekutuan
- Status: Shelved in 2017; 9 years ago
- Line number: B2 (Purple)
- Locale: Klang Valley
- Termini: FB1 Pasar Seni; FB24 Klang
- Stations: 24

Service
- Type: Bus rapid transit
- System: Hybrid System (combination of Direct Service, Trunk and Feeder)
- Services: Phase 1A : Pasar Seni – Kerinchi; Phase 1B : Petaling Jaya – Subang Jaya; Phase 2 : Shah Alam – Klang
- Daily ridership: 600,000 daily (expected)

Technical
- Line length: 32.52 km (20 mi)
Route map

The BRT Federal Line was a proposed bus rapid transit for Kuala Lumpur–Klang Corridors, and it has been identified in the KL BRT Report 2011 as one of the potential BRT Corridors in the Klang Valley region. The BRT project was planned to be operational by 2018, but is now shelved indefinitely. The government cited "redundancies with the LRT3 (Shah Alam Line)" as the reason for its decision to cancel the project.

Designed to complement existing bus and rail transport networks, the BRT Federal line was to employ all-electric buses similar to BRT Sunway Line, however at ground level.

== Background and history ==
According to a World Bank Report, the Klang-Shah Alam-Petaling Jaya corridor has nearly a million private vehicles travelling on the Federal Highway daily during morning peak hours. Transport Minister, Liow Tiong Lai has proposed the BRT KL-Klang line to ease the congestion. Unlike the BRT Sunway Line, the BRT KL-Klang will be on ground level.

Prime Minister, Najib Razak has allocated RM 1.5 billion for the project during the 2016 Budget presentation.

The BRT line is planned to be built in the middle of Federal Highway and the construction is expected to start in the third quarter of 2016. Upon completion, about 80% of the BRT line will offer some form of connection with the LRT as well as KTM Komuter and will cut down travel times between Kuala Lumpur and Klang to 40 minutes from current 70 minutes. This project was said to start from Q3-2016, but no progress has been done yet.

Although the Transport Minister, Liow Tiong Lai, said that the project would be finished in 2 or 3 years time, it was confirmed to be shelved by the Economic Council, to "give priority to other transportation projects such as the high speed rail and the mass rapid transit". The Land Public Transport Commission (SPAD) has also annulled the BRT tender as shown on their website.

== Timeline ==
19 January 2017 - SPAD invites bid for "comprehensive planning, design, finance, construction, operation, maintenance and upgrade" of the KL-Klang BRT project.

24 November 2017 - The tender agreement by the Land Public Transport Commission was officially annulled.

== See also ==
- List of bus rapid transit systems
- Prasarana Malaysia Berhad
  - Rapid Bus
    - Rapid KL
    - Rapid Penang
    - Rapid Kuantan
- Public transport in Kuala Lumpur
- Buses in Kuala Lumpur
