= Rapid Bus =

Malaysian bus operator

Rapid Bus Sdn Bhd
- Type: Private Limited
- Industry: Public Transport Operator
- Founded: January 2006
- Headquarters: Lot 1499, Jalan KB 2/15 Balakong, 43300 Seri Kembangan, Selangor.
- Area served: Klang Valley, Penang & Kuantan
- Key people: Muhammad Yazurin Sallij Muhammad Yasin (Chief Executive Officer)
- Services: Bus service
- Parent: Prasarana Malaysia
- Website: www.myrapid.com.my

- Parent: Prasarana Malaysia
- Headquarters: Kuala Lumpur, Malaysia
- Routes: 113 + 69 (MRT Feeder Bus) + 8 (Nadi Putra)
- Fleet: 1,355 (2025)
- Daily ridership: 182,652 (Total, 2025) (▲13.4%); 117,969 (RapidKL, 2025) (▲10.6%); 64,683 (MRT Feeder Bus, 2025) (▲18.9%)
- Annual ridership: 59.07 million (Total, 2025) (▲12.1%); 39.03 million (RapidKL, 2025) (▲9.3%); 20.04 million (MRT Feeder Bus, 2025) (▲17.8%)
- Website: Rapid Bus

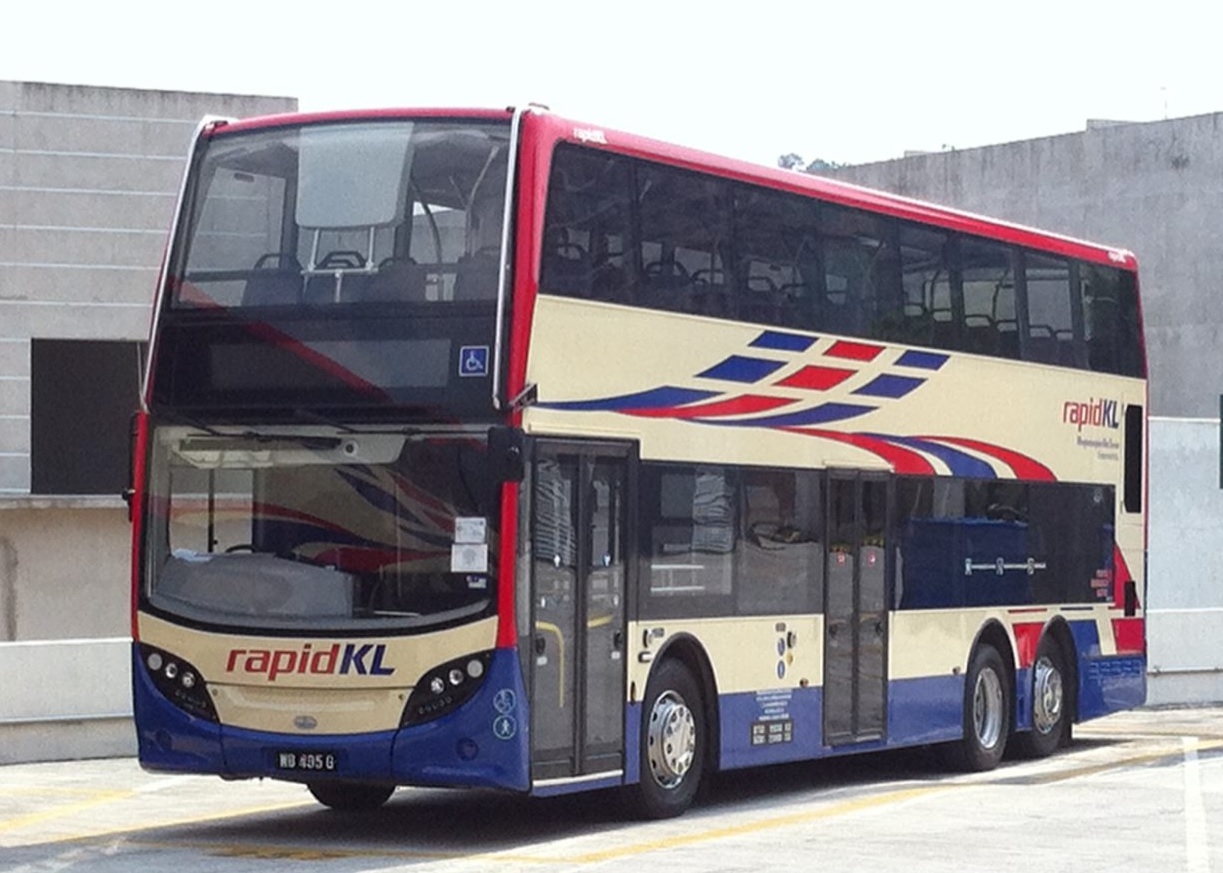
Rapid KL Alexander Dennis Enviro500 MMC parked at Cheras Selatan depot.

Rapid KL Foton AUV C12 BJ6129EVCA electric bus for BRT Sunway Line

Rapid Bus Sdn Bhd is the largest bus operator in Malaysia operating mainly in urban areas of Klang Valley and Penang. As of January 2026, Rapid KL service brands unit of Rapid Bus, has operates 105 normal routes and also 69 MRT Feeder Bus routes, along with 7 Nadiputra routes in Putrajaya.

Rapid Bus routes were previously operated by Intrakota Komposit Sdn Bhd, a subsidiary of DRB-Hicom Berhad; and Cityliner Sdn Bhd, a subsidiary of Park May Berhad. When it took over, there were 179 routes. Since January 2006, Rapid KL has redrawn the entire network.

Rapid Bus is however not the only bus operator in Kuala Lumpur and the Klang Valley. Other bus operators such as Selangor Omnibus, MARA Liner and Causeway Link also serve the Klang Valley.

== History ==
In October 2003, Prasarana Malaysia Berhad bought over Intrakota Komposit and its subsidiaries from DRB-Hicom for RM177mil. It also paid RM14mil cash for the 364 buses belonging to Cityliner. The original companies were appointed as interim operators.

Rapid Bus began the first phase of the revamp of its bus network in January 2006 by introducing 15 City Shuttle bus routes which continue to serve major areas in the central business district of Kuala Lumpur. The buses run between four hubs at the edge of the central business district, namely KL Sentral, Titiwangsa, KLCC and Maluri, and Medan Pasar in the city centre. These bus hubs also serve as rail interchanges, with the exception of Medan Pasar, although it is at a walking distance from Masjid Jamek LRT station.

In March 2006, Rapid Bus revamped the bus network serving Kepong, Selayang, Gombak, Batu Caves, Bandar Sri Damansara and Bandar Manjalara areas which it called Area 2. The areas are now service by four Trunk Routes and 35 Local Shuttle routes when fully implemented. The four trunk routes all begin from the Titiwangsa hub where passengers can change to City Shuttles. At the other end, the trunk routes serve regional hubs where Local Shuttles fan out into the residential suburbs.

On 30 April 2006, the bus network in Area 3 covering Setapak, Ulu Kelang, Wangsa Maju, Keramat, Ampang and Pandan was revamped. Three trunk bus routes serve this area, one from Titiwangsa and two from KLCC while 26 local shuttle routes complete the network for this area.

On 1 July 2006, two express services, four trunk lines and 32 local services were introduced in Area 4. It covers areas including Cheras, Serdang, Kajang, Balakong, Putrajaya, Cyberjaya and Bandar Baru Bangi.

On 23 September 2006, Rapid Bus' revamp of the Klang Valley's bus network became complete with the introduction of new routes in Area Five which covers Subang Jaya, USJ, Puchong, and Petaling Jaya, Shah Alam and Klang south of the Federal Highway; and Area Six which covers Damansara, Bandar Utama, Kota Damansara and areas of Petaling Jaya, Shah Alam and Klang north of the Federal Highway.

On 21 April 2007, sixteen months after the first part of the first revamp, a second major revamp was undertaken on the entire bus network on grounds of feedback from commuters who wanted the buses to ferry them from their housing estates directly to the city center without a need to change buses in the middle of their journey.

This revamp saw the routes being adjusted (e.g. B112 [Maluri — KL Sentral], formerly 112, now passes by Jalan Hang Tuah/Pudu/Tun Tan Cheng Lock instead of Jalan Maharajalela/Sultan Sulaiman), extended (T40 [Kajang — Maluri], is now U40 and is extended to Pasar Seni LRT), merged (T41 [Serdang Komuter — Maluri] and 414 [Serdang — Bandar Sungai Long] become U41 [Pasar Seni LRT — Bandar Sungai Long]) or discontinued (route 107 ceased operations on that date).

On 1 December 2015, a third revamp, known as The Bus Network Revamp (BNR) was carried out by SPAD to improve urban public transport in Greater Kuala Lumpur/ Klang Valley. This procedure has caused RapidKL to surrender most of its bus routes to other bus providers such as Causeway Link, Selangor Omnibus, Setara Jaya and Nadi Putra, and also changes to the route numbers.

On 18 June 2020, Rapid Bus released new features on real time locations of bus in Google Maps, via collaboration with Google Transit. Almost 170 RapidKL's bus routes are covered with this real-time feature and were expanded to MRT feeder bus service as well as Rapid Penang and Rapid Kuantan.

In 2023, Rapid KL took over as the bus service operator for Pengangkutan Awam Putrajaya Travel & Tours Sdn Bhd in Putrajaya.

In 2026, Rapid KL conducted the bus service restructuring process on some low-demand routes for service optimization and boosted efficiency. Over 29 bus routes were affected by the bus service restructuring, which was done in phases. The affected routes were converted to demand-responsive transit (DRT) service known as Rapid On-Demand or replaced with another parallel rail service.

== Services ==
=== Current services ===
- Rapid KL, a unit of Rapid Bus currently the largest operator stage bus services in Klang Valley.
- Rapid Penang, a unit of Rapid Bus currently the only one operator in Penang island & largest operator stage bus services in Penang northern state of Malaysia.
- PJ City Bus, a free bus service funded by Petaling Jaya City Council (MBPJ).
- Smart Selangor Bus, the largest free bus service funded by Selangor State Government. Rapid Bus is an operator of Smart Selangor buses for Shah Alam City Council (MBSA) (SA02, SA05, SA07 and SA08), Ampang Jaya Municipal Council (MPAJ), Kajang Municipal Council (MPKj), Selayang Municipal Council (MPS) and Kuala Langat Municipal Council (MPKL).
- MBPP Rapid Penang Free Shuttle for Bridge Express Shuttle Transit (BEST), Central Area Transit (CAT) and Pulau Tikus Loop (PTL) funded by Penang Island City Council (MBPP). Only CAT for George Town, CAT Bridge and BEST remain with the addition of CAT Hospital; the others are being terminated.
- Nadi Putra, a unit of Rapid Bus funded by Putrajaya Corporation, launched on 1 January 2023. It replaced the previous bus operator, Pengangkutan Awam Putrajaya Travel & Tours Sdn Bhd, which was privatized in 2018.

=== Former services ===
- Rapid Kuantan, the largest stage bus services in Kuantan, Pahang east coast state of Malaysia, terminated on 15 December 2025. The services had been transferred to BAS.MY Kuantan, operated by Sanwa Tours.
- Rapid Kamunting, the stage bus service at Kamunting & Taiping, Perak, terminated on 15 June 2021.
- Go KL City Bus, one of the operators for free bus service funded by Land Public Transport Commission (SPAD) and later Kuala Lumpur City Hall (DBKL). The services had been transferred to SKS Bus since 2021.
- Rapid Manjung, a unit of Rapid Bus in Manjung, terminated on 1 November 2020.
- Rapid Bus previously operated Smart Selangor buses for Shah Alam City Council (MBSA) (route SA01, SA03, SA04, SA06, SA10), Klang Royal City Council (MBDK) (all routes), Subang Jaya City Council (MBSJ), and Sepang Municipal Council (MPSepang) (all routes).
- MBPP Rapid Penang Free Shuttle Central Area Transit (CAT) services in Seberang Jaya, Bukit Mertajam, Alma, Batu Kawan, Nibong Tebal, and Bertam.

== Using Rapid Bus in Rapid KL brands ==
=== Nomenclature (Before BNR): 2006–2015 ===
Rapid Bus operates four types of bus services: City Shuttles (Malay: Perkhidmatan bandar), Trunk Buses (Perkhidmatan utama), Local Shuttles (Perkhidmatan tempatan) and point-to-point Express buses (Perkhidmatan ekspres).

City Shuttles have red destination boards, trunk buses have blue boards, local shuttles have green boards and express services have orange boards.

Rapid Bus has also divided up the Klang Valley into six areas:

- Area One: Kuala Lumpur City Centre (Central Business District)
- Area Two: Kepong, Segambut, Selayang, Batu Caves, Gombak, Jalan Ipoh and Sentul
- Area Three: Setapak, Wangsa Maju, Ulu Klang, Setiawangsa, Keramat, Ampang and Pandan
- Area Four: Cheras, Kajang, Ulu Langat, Putrajaya, Cyberjaya, Semenyih, Sungai Besi, Seri Kembangan, Serdang and Balakong
- Area Five: Klang, Shah Alam Selatan, Bandar Sunway, Subang Jaya, Jalan Klang Lama and Puchong
- Area Six: Shah Alam Utara, Subang, Damansara, Petaling Jaya Utara, Bangsar and Kota Damansara

Route numbers for the local shuttle are prefixed by the letter T (for Tempatan), e.g. T323. Route numbers for the express services are prefixed by the letter E (for Ekspres), e.g. E11A.

There was a prefix for trunk shuttles which is U (for Utama) e.g. U410 and for city shuttles which is B (for Bandar), e.g. B114. Later all the prefix were demolished due to the revamping of the Land Public Transport Commission (SPAD) except the local shuttle T (Tempatan) services.

=== The Bus Network Revamp (BNR): 2015–present ===
The Ampang Corridor, Cheras Corridor, Sungai Besi Corridor, Klang Lama Corridor, Lebuhraya Persekutuan Corridor, Damansara Corridor, Jalan Ipoh Corridor, and Jalan Pahang Corridor were revamped under the Bus Network Revamp reorganization.

The Land Public Transport Commission) has divided up the Klang Valley into 8 stage bus corridors:

- Jalan Ipoh Corridor
- Jalan Pahang Corridor
- Ampang Corridor
- Cheras Corridor
- Sungai Besi Corridor
- Klang Lama Corridor
- Lebuhraya Persekutuan Corridor
- Damansara Corridor

The Bus Network Revamp has been implemented by Land Public Transport Commission since December 2015.

=== Bus routes ===
==== Former bus routes served by Rapid Bus before BNR ====
Before the implementation of the Bus Network Revamp (BNR) by the Land Public Transport Commission, these are the former routes being served by Rapid Bus.

Previous route number	Destination	New route number under BNR
U3	Bandar Baru Selayang – Medan Pasar	Rapid KL (Route 151); Previously served by Setara Jaya (December 2015 – 2022) and MARA Liner (2022 - January 2023)
U4	Desa Aman Puri – Medan Pasar	Selangor Omnibus (Route 104)
U5	Taman Melati LRT station – Lebuh Amapng	Not in service (replaced with route T203 by Rapid Bus; towards Danau Kota / Jalan Genting Klang)
U8	Damansara Damai – Medan Pasar	Selangor Omibus (Route 103)
U11	Taman Sri Sinar – Medan Pasar	Selangor Omnibus (Route 121); Previously served by Setara Jaya (December 2015 – March 2016) and Causeway Link (March 2016 – July 2017)
U13	Taman Ehsan – Medan Pasar	Selangor Omnibus (Route 120); Previously served by Setara Jaya (December 2015 – March 2016) and Causeway Link (March 2016 – July 2017)
U21	Ukay Perdana – Chow Kit	Not in service (replaced with route T222 by Rapid Bus; towards Sri Rampai LRT station)
U22	Sri Nilam – Lebuh Ampang	Not in service (replaced with route 300 by Rapid Bus)
U25	Seksyen 10, Wangsa Maju – Lebuh Ampang	Leng Seng and Rapid Bus (Route 251/252)
U42	Putrajaya Sentral – Serdang railway station	Not in service (replaced with route T 523 by KR Travel & Tours); Previously served by Nadi Putra (December 2015 - March 2020) and KR Travel & Tours (June 2020 - May 2022)
U69	Putra Perdana – Pasar Seni	Causeway Link (Route 601); Previously served by Metrobus (December 2015 – October 2016)
U75A	Pantai Dalam Komuter station – Pasar Seni	Not in service
U83	KL Sentral – Solaris Dutamas via Bukit Damansara	Rapid Bus (Route 850); No longer in service as of 1 December 2017, replaced with Route 852, starting from Titiwangsa
U84	Kelana Park View – Pasar Seni	Not in service
U85	Taman Paramount LRT station – Pasar Seni	Not in service (replaced with route T790 by Rapid Bus; towards Mid Valley Megamall)
U91	Klang – Pasar Seni	Not in service (replaced with routes 700 by Seranas, KKBB and 708 by Rapid Bus); 700: Klang – Pasar Seni; 708: Klang – Sunway Pyramid via Shah Alam
U209	Taman Selayang Utama – Medan Pasar	MARA Liner (Route 152); Previously served by Setara Jaya (December 2015 – 2022)
U222	Jinjang Utara – Medan Pasar	Selangor Omnibus (Route 120); Previously served by Setara Jaya (December 2015 – March 2016) and Causeway Link (March 2016 – July 2017)
T229	Metro Prima Kepong – Bandar Baru Selayang	Rapid KL MRT (Route T114)
U429	Putrajaya Sentral – Cyberjaya	Currently not in service Previously served by Nadi Putra (December 2015 - March 2020) and Kumpool (from August 2022 onwards)
E1	Putrajaya Sentral – Pasar Seni	Not in service (replaced with route T 523 by KR Travel & Tours); Previously served by Nadi Putra (December 2015 - March 2020) and KR Travel & Tours (June 2020 - May 2022)
T515	Puchong Utama – Pulau Meranti	Causeway Link (Route 608); from IOI Puchong Jaya LRT station Previously served by Metrobus (December 2015 – January 2016) and Nadi Putra (January 2016 – October 2017)

=== Using the service ===
Rapid Bus new bus system expects users to hop on more than one bus to complete a journey. This is unlike the previous Rapid Bus bus system and that still in use by other bus operators in the Klang Valley, where most bus services begin in the suburbs, follow a trunk route to the city, then perform a sweep in the city centre before terminating.

Instead, Rapid Bus users are expected to use a combination of its four types of services to complete journeys. Local Shuttles take users in the suburbs to hubs, usually bus terminals or LRT stations, where users transfer to LRTs or trunk buses to continue their journeys to the city or elsewhere in the Klang Valley. The city centre is served exclusively by GoKL City Bus.

=== Fares ===
Since 1 September 2009, all Rapid Bus buses are issued a single journey tickets for their city shuttle (BANDAR), local shuttle (TEMPATAN) and express (EKSPRES) bus routes, which replaced the daily unlimited ride tickets. As for trunk shuttle (UTAMA) bus route, the tickets are issued based on the number of zones covered. For example, if a person travels across three zones on the trunk shuttle (UTAMA) bus route, the bus fare is RM 2.50 for single journey. The ticket must be kept while on board for inspection by RapidKL officials, failure of which the ticket must be purchased again if the ticket is lost while on board during the inspection.

A spouse and a total of four children under 15 years old are allowed to accompany the pass holder free on weekends and public holidays.

In 10 April of 2019, all RapidKL buses implemented full cashless journey for all routes by stages, in which the bus only accepts Touch n Go card only for user convenience. The systems were fully implemented by 27 May 2019.

The fares for each zone per single journey is as follows

Zones travelled (RM)
Zones	1	2	3	4/BET
Adults	1.00	1.90	2.50	3.00
Concessions	0.50	0.90	1.20	1.50

There are also several travel passes available, such as MyCity Pass, which provides short-term daily unlimited journeys (bus and rail) for Malaysians and non-Malaysians, while My50 (formerly known as My100 in 2019 and My50 in 2019 for bus services only, then My30 in 2020 & 2021) provides monthly unlimited journey for Malaysian citizens only.

=== Schedules ===
Detailed schedules of bus services are not published, although headway information and operating hours is publicly available.

Headway:

- City Shuttle: 10 to 20 minutes
- Trunk Line (UTAMA): 15 to 30 minutes
- Local Shuttle (TEMPATAN): 30 to 75 minutes

There are scheduled services that are not subject to the above headways.

== Rapid On-Demand ==
Rapid DRT vans at Taman Paramount station

Rapid Bus provides the demand-responsive transit (DRT) service, currently known as Rapid On-Demand. Rapid On-Demand provides a flexible, ride-sharing public transportation service that operates without fixed routes or schedules. These vans are dynamically dispatched based on passenger requests through the Rapid on-Demand app, optimizing routes in real-time using AI and GPS tracking.

Rapid on-Demand was first introduced as the proof-of-concept (POC) service in Wangsa Maju through route T250 from 3 October 2022 to 5 February 2023, followed by Alam Megah through route T757 from 13 February 2023 (now a permanent DRT service that replaced the feeder bus service) and Universiti Malaya through route T789 from 15 May 2023 to 14 August 2023. The promotional rate of fare was RM1.00 which was available from the start of the proof-of-concept service in 2023 until 31 January 2026 where it became RM2.00. In addition, passengers with monthly passes are now required to pay the booking fare of the service.

As of July 2025 where the DRT proof-of-concept service was successful in 2023, there are currently 92 Rapid On-Demand services in operation (79 Rapid KL On-Demand & 13 Rapid Penang On-Demand) with 300 vans deployed. Some of the on-demand routes are replacing the respective feeder bus services, which have lower ridership. The Rapid on-demand services have expanded to service areas without Rapid KL bus and rail services, such as the Rawang, Sepang & Klang areas in Selangor as well as the Seberang Perai area in Penang.

== RapidBET – Rapid Bus Express Transit service ==
In 2010, SPAD introduced the express transit system in Klang Valley, namely BET, where the buses utilize less congested highways to link heavily populated areas and city centers in Kuala Lumpur, Putrajaya and Penang. Naturally, by using the highways, travel time is reduced, as the highways are less congested than the normal routes. The service will have limited stops and rely on feeder buses and park-n-ride facilities to ensure sufficient ridership. With BET, travel time is expected to be reduced by up to 50 percent on certain BETs.

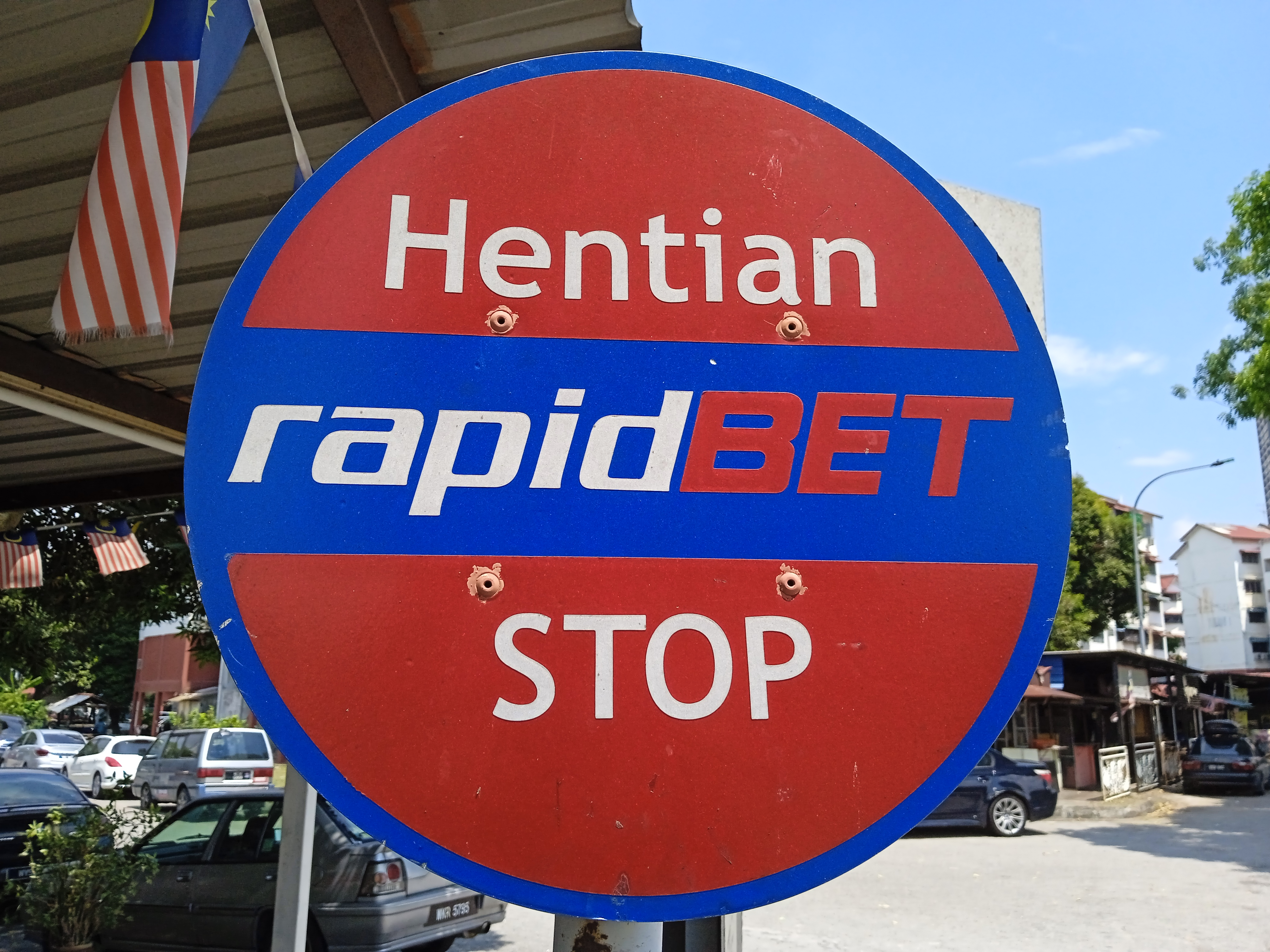
Designated RapidBET stop sign near Kota Damansara, Selangor

During the introduction of these services, there were six routes managed by Rapid KL, and these services were only available on weekdays and during the morning and evening rush hours only. For this initial introductory stage, BET ran at 15 minute intervals during the morning and evening peak hours. Frequency and service periods were increased at a later stage depending on the demand for each route.

Buses for BET routes consisted of two to five buses initially and continued to be reviewed from time to time as the demand grew. BET is more of an enhancement to the current services, whereby the focus is more to shorten the travel time. Fare for a single journey on RapidKL is RM3 for adults and RM1.50 for concession, at a flat rate.

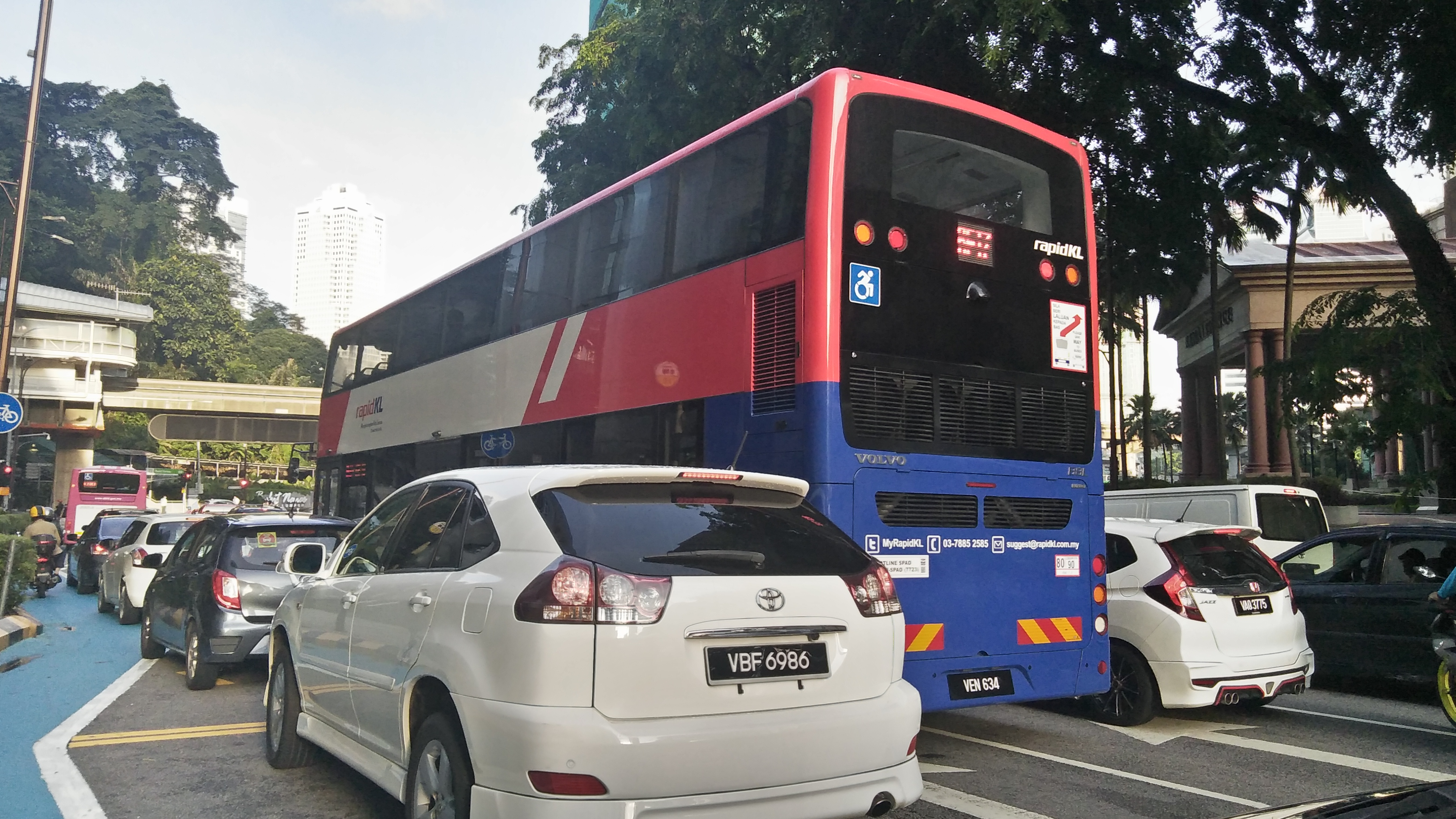
Double-deck bus on BET7 Sri Nilam-Lebuh Ampang in the morning rush hour at Renaissance Hotel in Kuala Lumpur. This route is more heavily used than any other BET service.

As the rail system has been extended, most of the BET ridership has declined, resulting in the termination of most of the BET routes inside the Kuala Lumpur district area. The last BET inside the Kuala Lumpur district area was the BET7, from Sri Nilam at Bandar Baru Ampang, parallel to bus route 300 until LRT Ampang, then bypassing through Ampang-Kuala Lumpur Elevated Highway (AKLEH) until Jalan Tun Razak interchange, then re-merging on 300 at Ampang Park LRT station before terminating at Munshi Abullah bus hub. This route was more heavily used than any other BETs, and the bus only runs during morning rush hour, 4 trips daily. The fleet used is the Alexander Dennis Enviro500 and Volvo B8L double-decker bus.

As of May 2021, the service was suspended due to Malaysia's total lockdown. Rapid KL has since discontinued the BET7 service and replaced it with the new DS01 direct service in 2022. However, the DS01 service was discontinued on 16 January 2026.

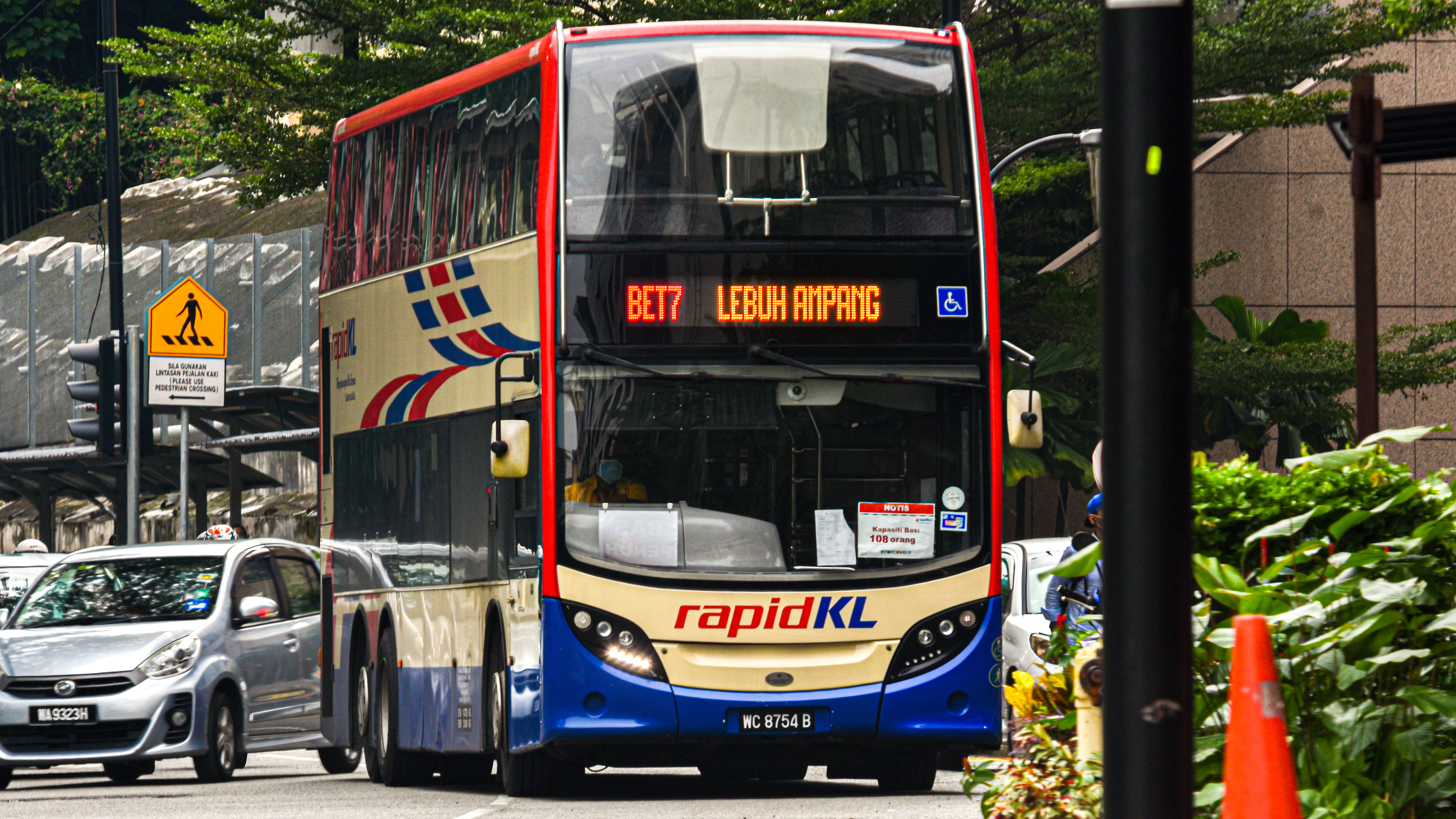
Alexander Dennis Enviro500

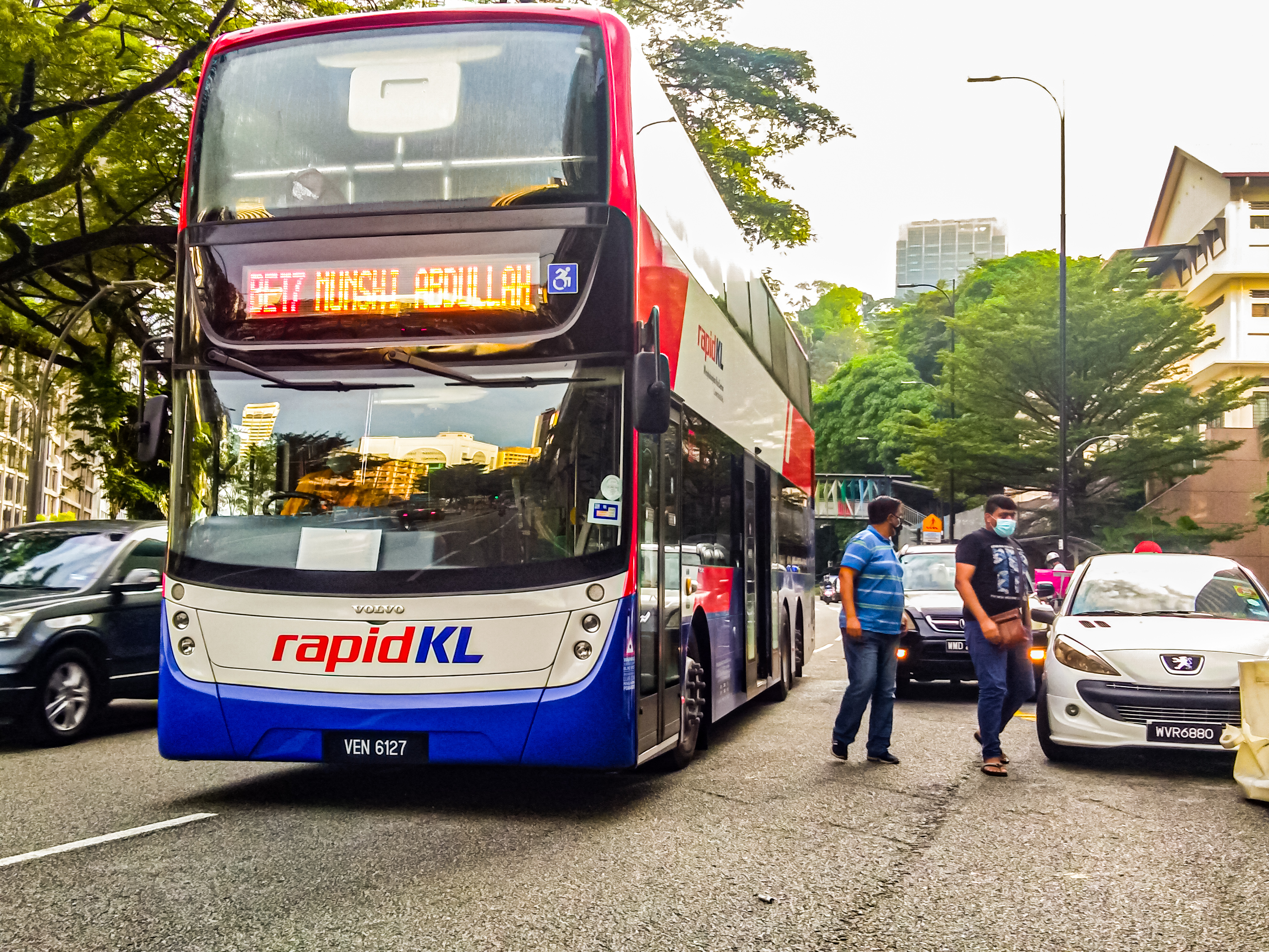
Volvo B8L

=== Gombak District-Putrajaya BET Routes ===
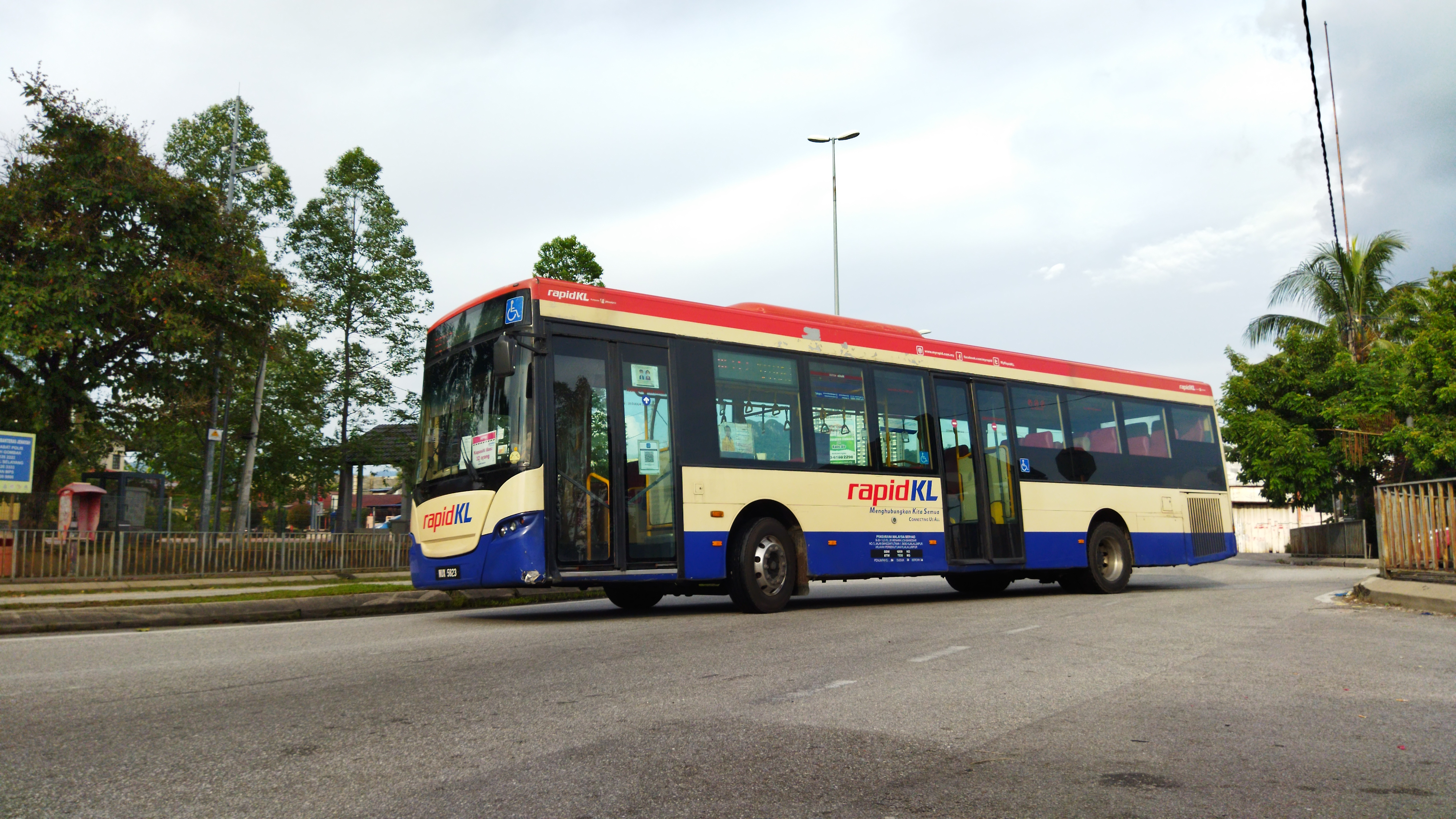
King Long XMQ6121G on BET17 service at Greenwood terminal.

These two BET services serve the Putrajaya Presint 2 central district for government employees between Selayang, Batu Caves, Melawati and Putrajaya. They are the only BET routes that bypass the Kuala Lumpur district area and the only BET services operated by Rapid KL. The bus runs 4 trips daily per route: 2 morning trips to Putrajaya and 2 return evening trips. The buses consist of five specially modified King Long XMQ6121G, of which the transverse seatings were displaced from the former Mercedes Benz CBC1725 buses.

All of the BET routes were discontinued on 14 February 2026 due to service restructuring; effectively, there are no more Rapid KL BET routes in operation (except one route by MARA Liner, which serving Bukit Beruntung to Kuala Lumpur).

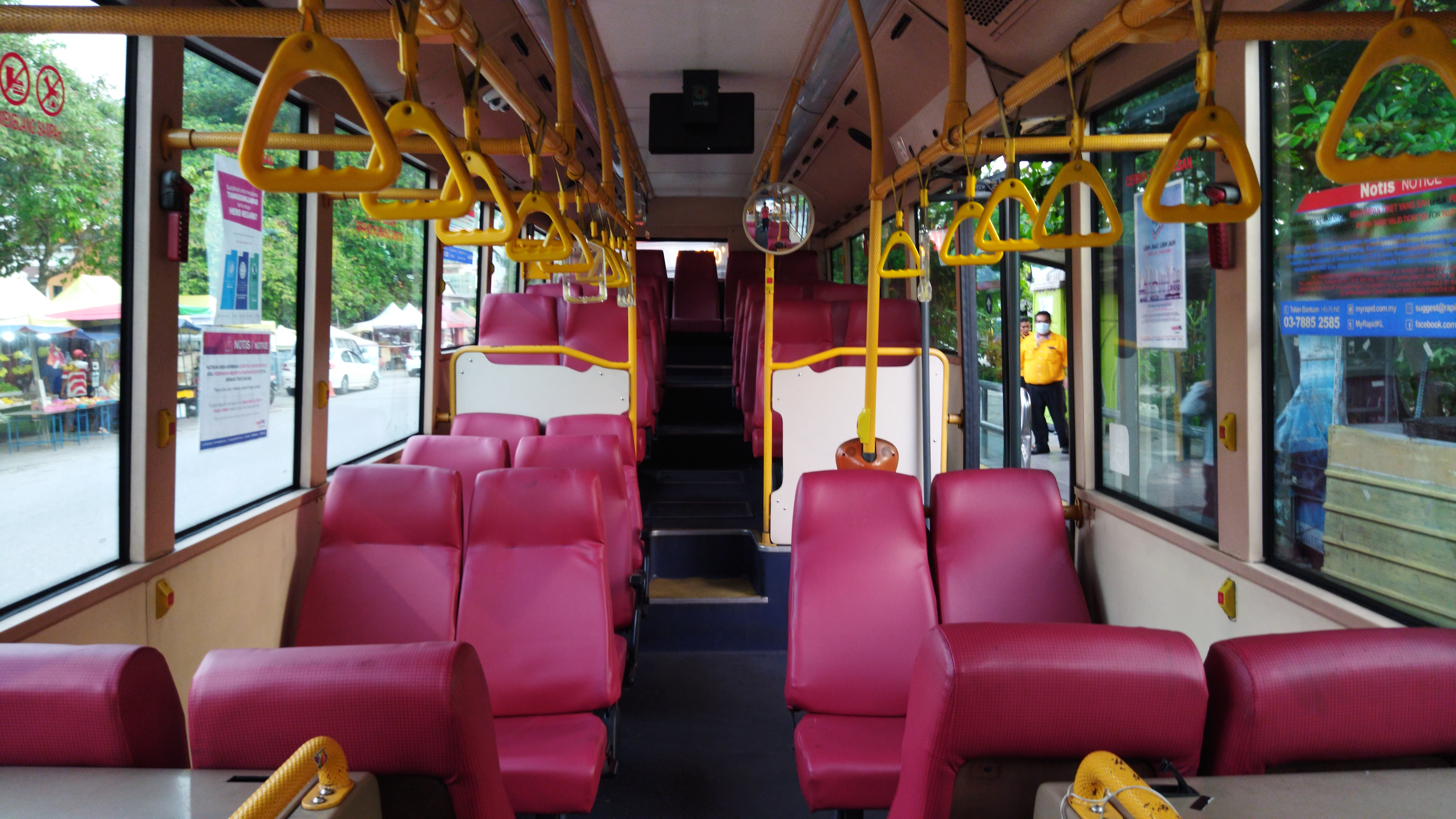
The former Mercedes-Benz seats were reused in selected King Long buses for long-haul service comfort.

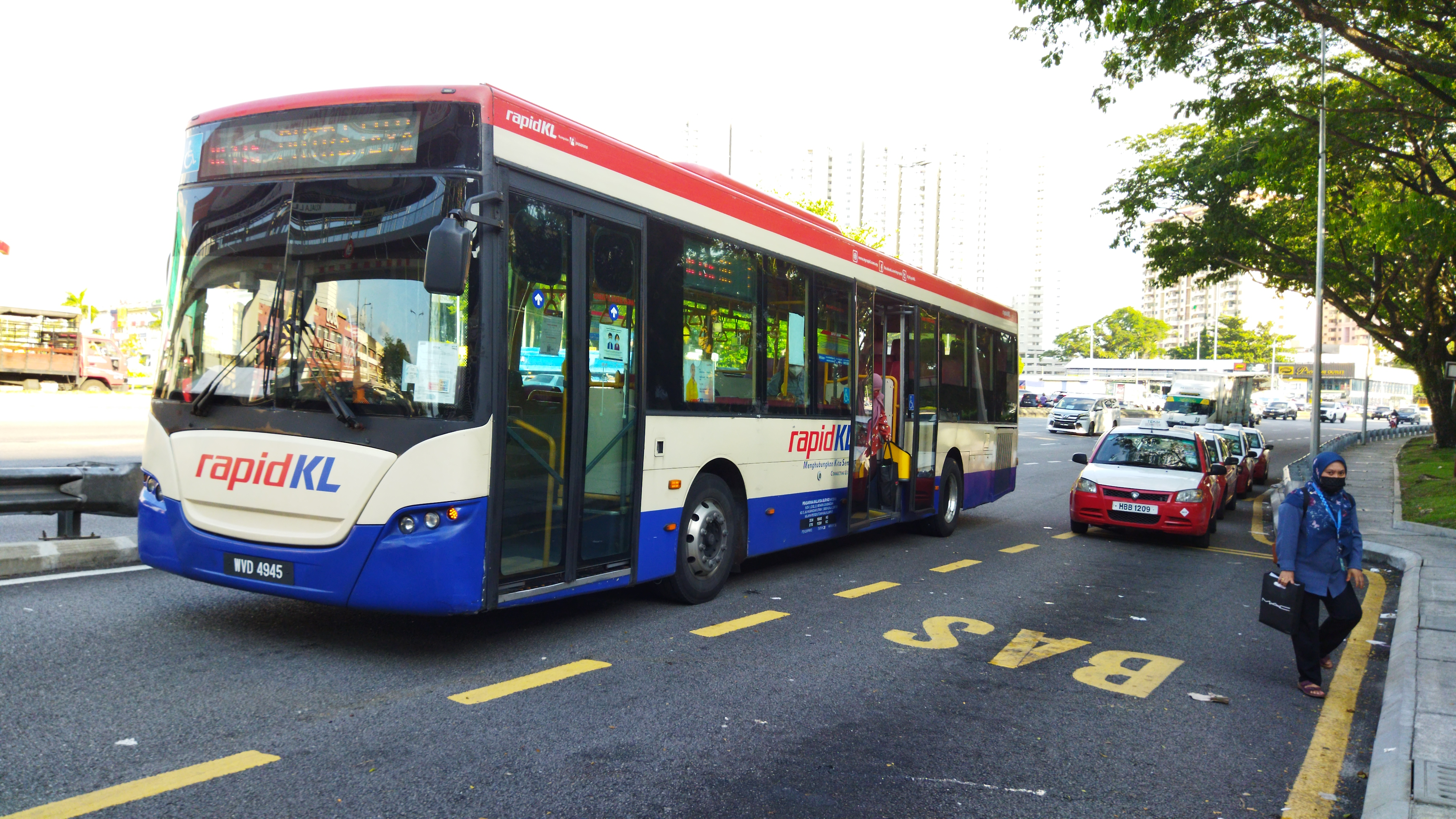
King Long XMQ6121G on BET16 service at Warta Lama bus stop.

=== Penang express service ===
- 401E – Pengkalan Weld, Penang – Queensbay Mall – Bayan Baru – Bayan Lepas International Airport – Balik Pulau via Tun Dr. Lim Chong Eu Expressway (normal service as 401)

=== Skip-Stop-Xpress bus service ===
On 16 May 2022, a new pilot programme called Skip-Stop-Xpress service are being introduced, on which the service focused on point-to-point, non-stop service in between. The bus runs on weekday morning and evening rush hour with a frequency of 30 minutes to 1 hour per bus. The first route, DS01 were the first to put on trial, starts from LRT Ampang until KLCC bus terminal with one stop at Ampang Park, similar to BET7 bus service. The trial proved successful, and the service were put on permanent service on 17 April 2023 with a fare of RM1.10, replacing the BET7 service.

=== Discontinued ===
Below were discontinued routes due to several reasons, such as ineffective route or low demand. This low demand were due to the MRT or LRT services already served the area.

- BET1 – Kota Damansara, Petaling Jaya – Pasar Seni Terminal E via the Penchala Link (normal service as 780, discontinued on 2018 due to MRT service)
- BET2 – Bandar Sungai Long, Kajang – HAB Lebuh Pudu bus hub via Grand Saga Cheras–Kajang Expressway (normal service as 590 (trunk route) and T415 (MRT feeder route), discontinued on 2018 due to MRT service)
- BET3 – Subang Mewah, USJ 1, Subang Jaya – Pasar Seni Terminal D via the New Pantai Expressway (normal service as 770, discontinued on 2020 due to pandemic and LRT service)
- BET4 – Taman Sri Muda, Shah Alam – Pasar Seni D via the New Pantai Expressway (normal service as 751, discontinued on 2020 due to low demand)
- BET7 – Sri Nilam > LRT Ampang > AKLEH > Ampang Park > KLCC > Lebuh Ampang > Hab Munshi Abdullah (normal service as 300, discontinued on 2022 due to introduction of DS01 direct service)
- BET8 – Semenyih Sentral, Semenyih to HAB Lebuh Pudu via the Kajang–Seremban Highway (discontinued on 2019 due to low demand, alternative services: T450 to MRT Stadium Kajang, followed by bus route 450 or MRT to KL)
- BET16 (previously known as E11A) – Warta Baru, Selayang – Presint 2 Putrajaya via Maju Expressway, Kuala Lumpur Middle Ring Road/Jalan Duta and Jalan Kuching (discontinued on 2026 due to MRT service)
- BET17 (previously known as E11B) – Hab Bas Pinggiran, Batu Caves – Hab Greenwood, Batu Caves – Presint 2 Putrajaya via Sungai Besi Expressway and Kuala Lumpur Middle Ring Road 2 (discontinued on 2026 due to MRT service)

=== Limited-stop service ===
Three routes has been chosen by Rapid KL for the limited stop trial service on 15 February 2021 until 1 April 2021. The service, parallel to the existing route, skips some stops along the way and only stops at major stops with high riderships. Until the end of trial, Rapid KL has decided to discontinue the service due to confusion with passengers and bus shortage.

== Bas Wanita – Bus for ladies only ==
In early December 2010, RapidKL introduced the very first 'Bas Wanita' services in Malaysia, a bus that serve exclusively for ladies passengers only during morning and evening rush hours. Like the KTM Komuter's Ladies Coach, this service is intended to avoid sexual harassment on the fully loaded normal buses during rush hours. 7 routes were put on trial with addition 8 routes after successful trial, with addition of a letter suffix 'W' at the end of route number to distinguish with normal services (e.g. U6W, U80W). Special stickers and signage were placed to make the services more visible. These services were proved to be successful, but they were later discontinued due to a shortage of buses.

== RapidPenang Intercity ==
On 2 August 2015, RapidPenang introduced the very first intercity route from Penang Sentral to Sungai Petani and Parit Buntar. This route uses Scania K250UB (previously Alexander Dennis Enviro500), and the frequency is one hour per bus.

- EB60 – Penang Sentral – Sungai Petani via North-South Expressway
- EB80 – Penang Sentral – Nibong Tebal and Parit Buntar via North-South Expressway

== Minibus trial ==
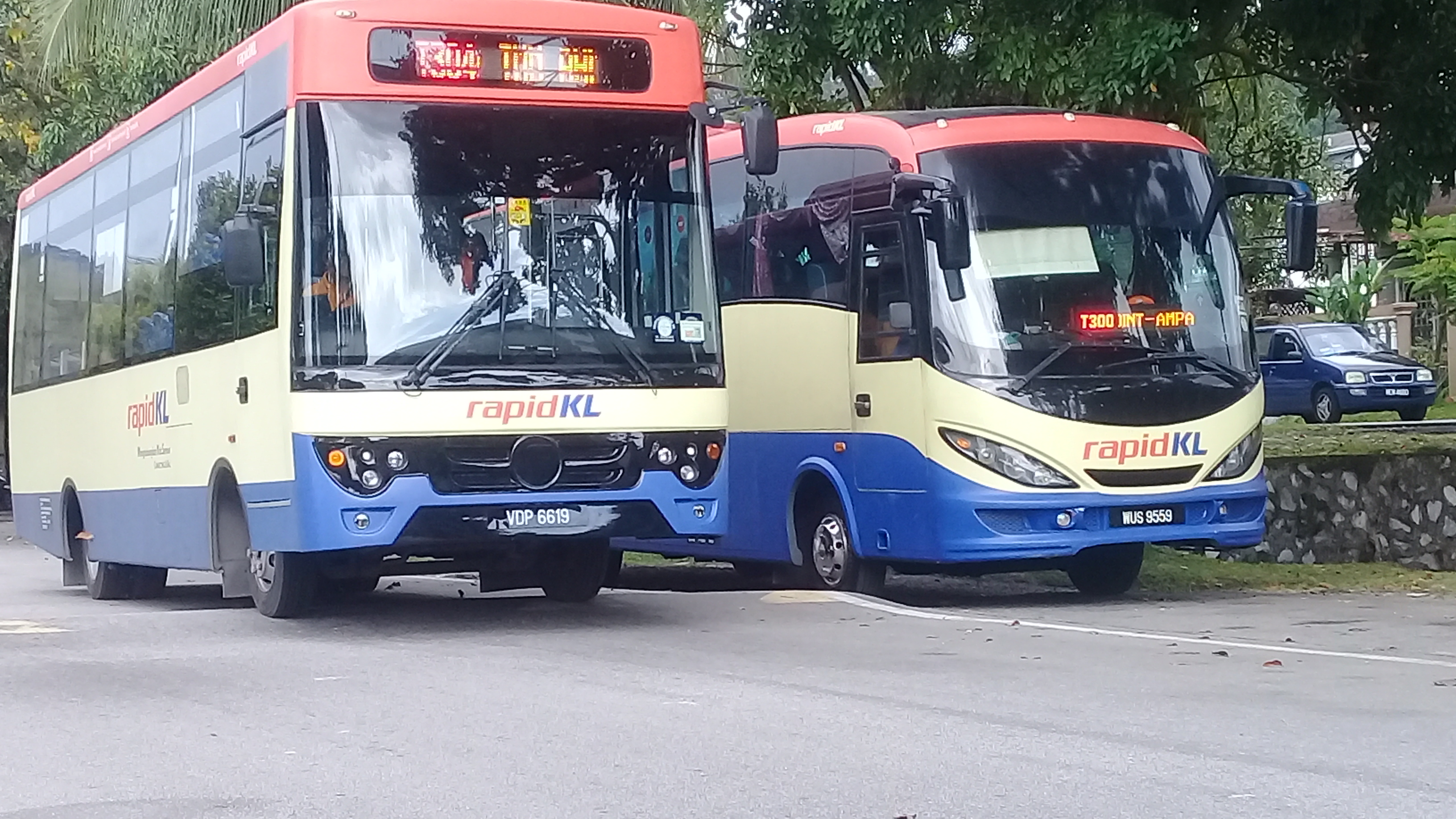
RapidKL Hino XZU midibus leased from Kiffah (right, T300) and Selangor Omnibus (left, T304).

In September 2019, Rapid KL re-introduced the minibus service to improve first-mile connectivity, especially for sharper and narrower routes. T300 is the first trial route to operate minibus service, using SKSBus E98 Midi-bodied Hino XZU high entry midibus leased from Kiffah Travel and Tours for 3 months. Later on 15 September 2019, another route, T304 were put on trial, using Pioneer-bodied Hino XZU high entry midibus leased from Selangor Omnibus for 3 months. One of the fleet were equipped with wheelchair hydraulic lift for wheelchair access.

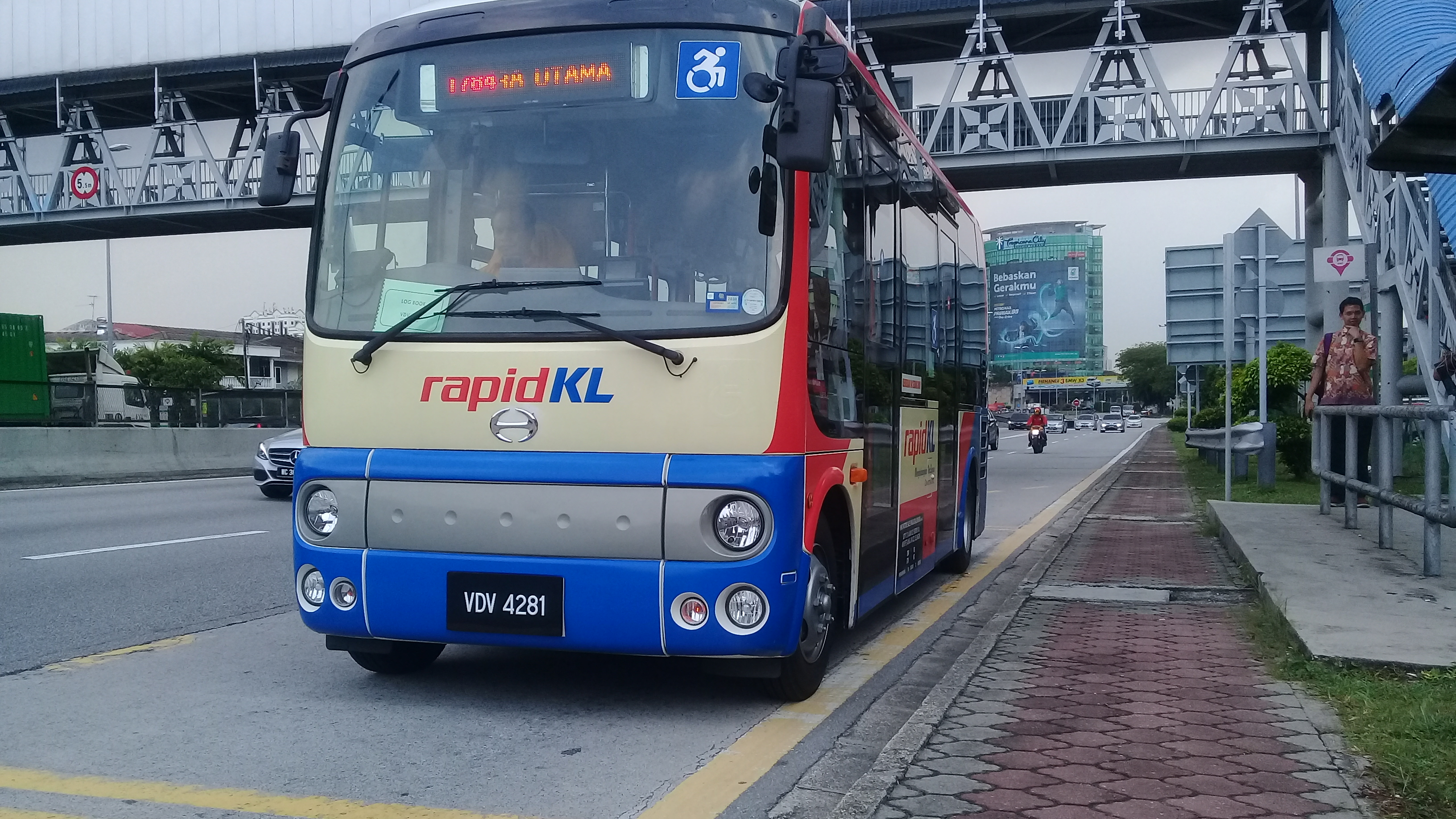
Hino Poncho test bus on route T784 at Damansara Utama. This is the shortest minibus on any other fleet used.

On 20 October 2019, Rapid KL put another bus on trial using newly imported Hino Poncho minibus leased from Hino Motors Malaysia, which served the T784 service for 3 months. This bus later transferred to Batu Caves for another trial on T201 service.

On 16 November 2020, another trials were implemented, using 2 Toyota Hiace and 1 Hyundai Starex vans on newly-created route T252 for 4 months.

All leased fleets were returned after trials were ended, however on 11 October 2021, Rapid KL resumed the Hino Poncho minibus trials on 302 service, later expanded the trials to Rapid Penang on 15 October 2021 on route 11. Rapid KL then resumed the trial on T851 parliament service from 20 February until 27 June 2023, on which the buses sent back to Hino Motors Malaysia after trial ended.

== Bus Fleet ==
As of June 2014, the Rapid Bus fleet consists of 1,400 vehicles.

=== Double decker buses ===
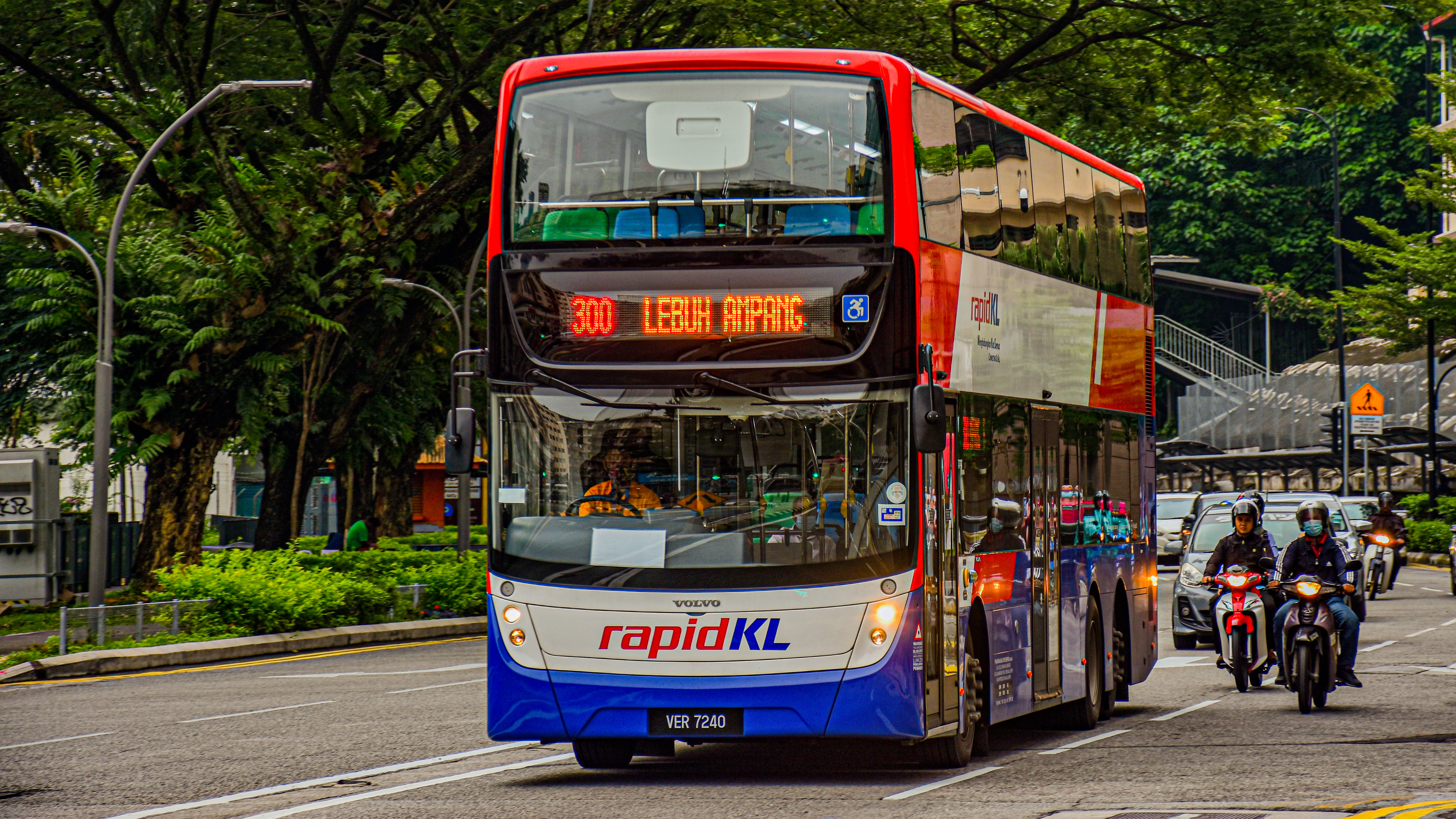
Double-deck buses

- Alexander Dennis Enviro500 MMC – 40 buses
- Volvo B8L Gemilang Body – 90 buses

=== Single deck buses ===
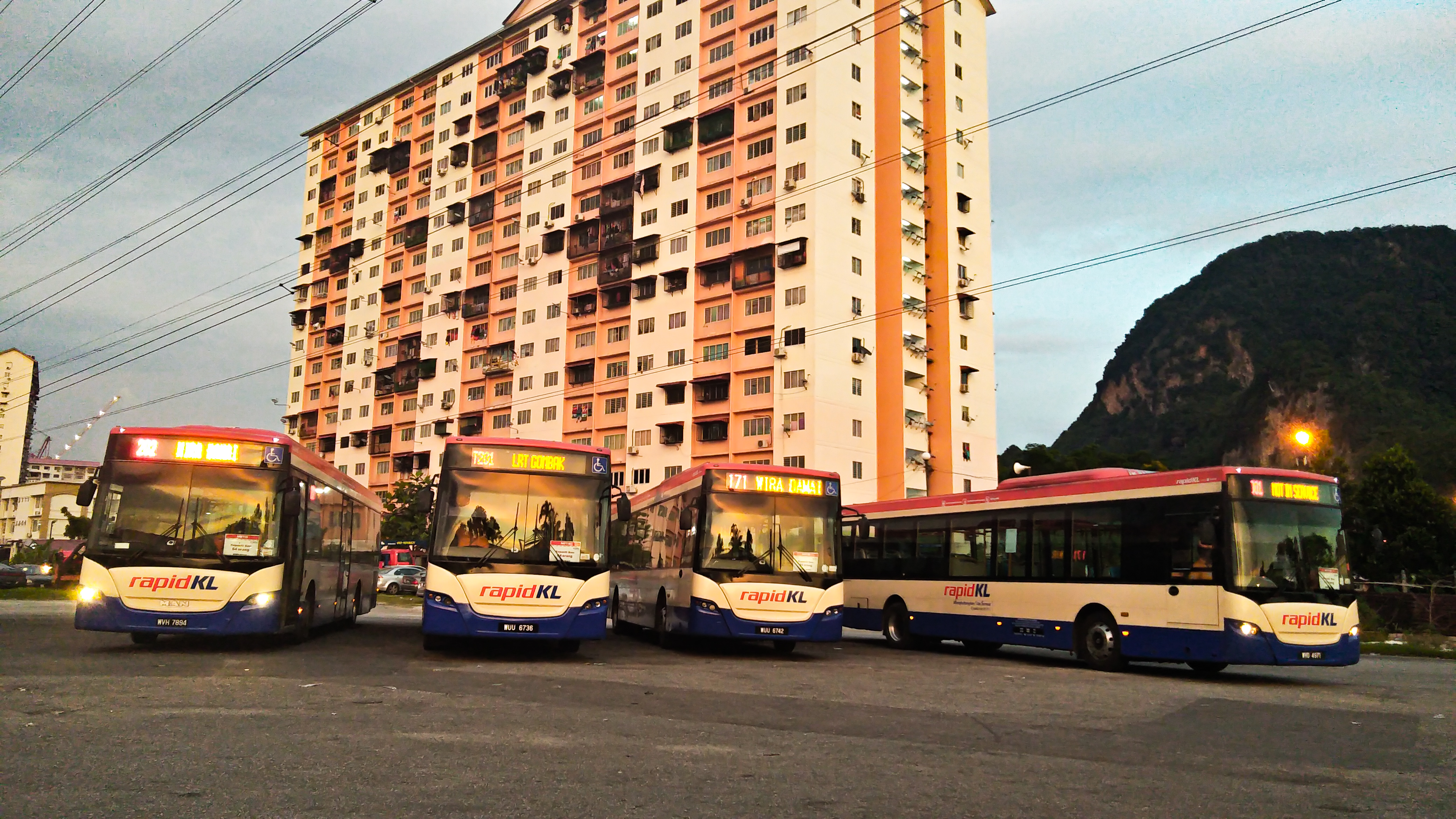
Single-deck buses

- King Long XMQ6121G Intercoach body – 80 buses
- MAN 18.280 HOCL-NL (A84) Gemilang body – 150 buses
- Scania K UB Series Gemilang body – 830 buses at Rapid KL, Rapid Penang and Rapid Kuantan
- Volvo B7RLE Gemilang body – 150 buses used for MRT Feeder Bus
- Scania K250UB Gemilang body – 150 buses used for MRT Feeder Bus
- Toyota Hiace van – 3 vans, two on RapidKL, one on RapidMobiliti taxi service in Penang
- Alexander Dennis Enviro200 – 80 buses, mostly on NadiPutra services
- Go Auto Higer Ace GA1C1 – used for Rapid DRT
- Foton View CS2 – used for Rapid DRT
- CAM Placer-X A4 - used for Rapid DRT
- SKSBus SA12-300 – leased from Handal Indah
- Yutong ZK6118HGA –leased from Handal Indah
- Yutong ZK6126HG – leased from Handal Indah
- SKSBus LEC-300H – leased from Handal Indah
- Scania K250IB SKS Ci09 / RTG InTech body – leased from Handal Indah
- Scania K310IB RTG InTech Body – leased from Handal Indah
- Golden Dragon XML6885J15 – leased from Handal Indah
- Foton C8L BJ6856C6BFB – leased from Handal Indah
- Volvo BZL - GML Eco Range – 1 electric bus, currently on trial POC on PJ Free Bus Services
- Higer KLQ6129G - 310 buses
- Higer KLQ6886G
- Foton AUV C12

=== Decommissioned ===
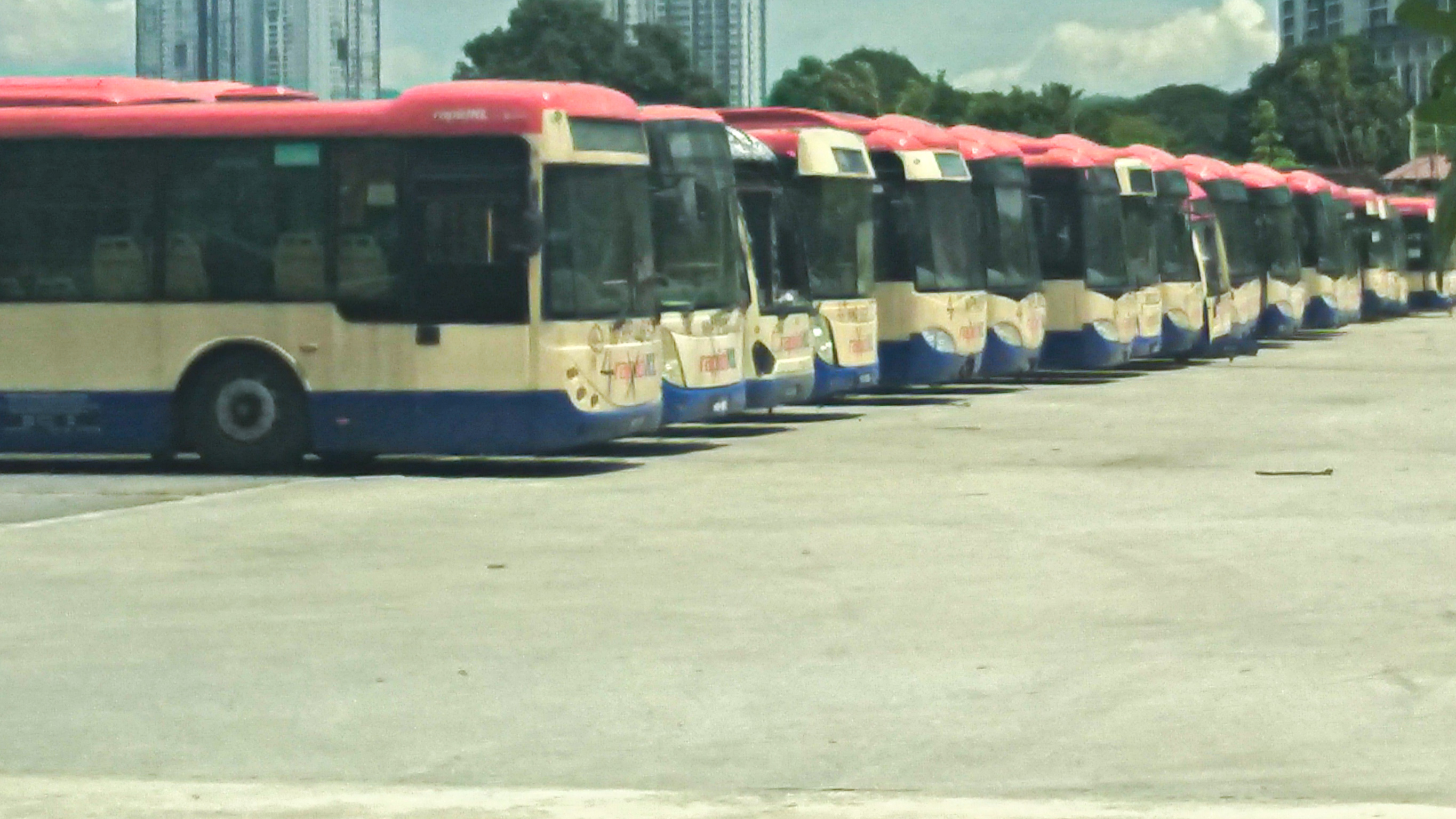
A bunch of decommissioned buses were left abandoned at Sentul Depot

- MAN SL 252 (previously used by Intrakota from 1994, decommissioned in 2007)
- Iveco Turbocity 480 (previously used by Intrakota from 1994, decommissioned in 2012)
- Mercedes Benz OH1318 (previously used by CityLiner Park May in the 90's, decommissioned in 2007)
- Dennis Dart (previously used by Putraline feeder bus in 1998, decommissioned in 2007)
- Dongfeng DHZ6120RC2 (decommissioned in 2019, part of vehicle fleet were sold to Setara Jaya and Kiffah Travel and Tours)
- Anyuan JXK6120 (decommissioned in 2019)
- King Long XMQ6122 (decommissioned in 2017, part of the vehicle fleet were sold to Setara Jaya)
- Higer KLQ6118 (decommissioned in 2015, preserved by RapidMobiliti)
- Higer KLQ6121G (decommissioned in 2020)
- JAC (part of RapidPenang minibus fleet, decommissioned in 2010)
- Sheng Long (caught on fire in Melawati depot)
- Hino XZU (leased from Selangor Omnibus and Kiffah Travel and Tours, end of trial contract)
- Mercedes-Benz CBC1725 Master Builders/SKS body (decommissioned in 2021)
- Hyundai Starex MPV (end of trial contract)
- Hino Poncho 2DG-HX9JHCE (leased from Hino Motors on 2019, end of trial contract in 2023)
- SKSBus SA-9 260L (decommissioned in 2023)
- Volvo B7RLE Deftech body, refurbished by QBC Scomi (decommissioned in April 2024)
- BYD K9 Gemilang body – 15 buses exclusive for BRT (decommissioned in November 2026)

== Bus Depots ==
Rapid Bus headquarters complex were located at Balakong (Kompleks Rapid Bus Cheras Selatan), where all training purposes, bus academy, new bus testing and major maintenance and overhaul takes place. It also holds as the largest depot than any other Rapid Bus depot. Other depots include Batu Caves, Shah Alam, Depoh Presint 14 and Maluri exclusive for Rapid KL. Rapid Penang currently have 5 depots, namely Lorong Kulit, Mak Mandin, Pengkalan Weld, Sungai Nibong and Nibong Tebal. Semambu depot is the only depot specifically built for Rapid Kuantan. For BRT Sunway Line, the depot located just before SunU-Monash station, while Sungai Buloh, Kajang, Desa Tun Razak, Serdang and Jinjang depots houses the MRT Feeder buses.

== See also ==
- Prasarana Malaysia Berhad
  - Rapid Bus Sdn Bhd
    - Rapid KL
      - B1 BRT Sunway Line
    - Rapid Penang
    - Rapid Kuantan
- Land Public Transport Commission
- Public transport in Kuala Lumpur
- Buses in Kuala Lumpur
- List of bus routes in Kuala Lumpur
