= Putrajaya Corporation =

Local authority of Putrajaya, Malaysia

- Perbadanan Putrajaya

Corporation overview
- Formed: 1995; 31 years ago
- Type: Local government
- Jurisdiction: Federal Government of Malaysia
- Headquarters: Kompleks Perbadanan Putrajaya Persiaran Perdana, Presint 3, 62675 Putrajaya
- Minister responsible: Zaliha Mustafa, Minister in the Prime Minister's Department (Federal Territories)
- Corporation executive: Mohd Sakeri bin Abdul Kadir, President
- Parent department: Department of Federal Territories, Prime Minister's Department
- Key document: Perbadanan Putrajaya Act 1995
- Website: https://www.ppj.gov.my

Footnotes
- Split from Sepang District Council in 2001

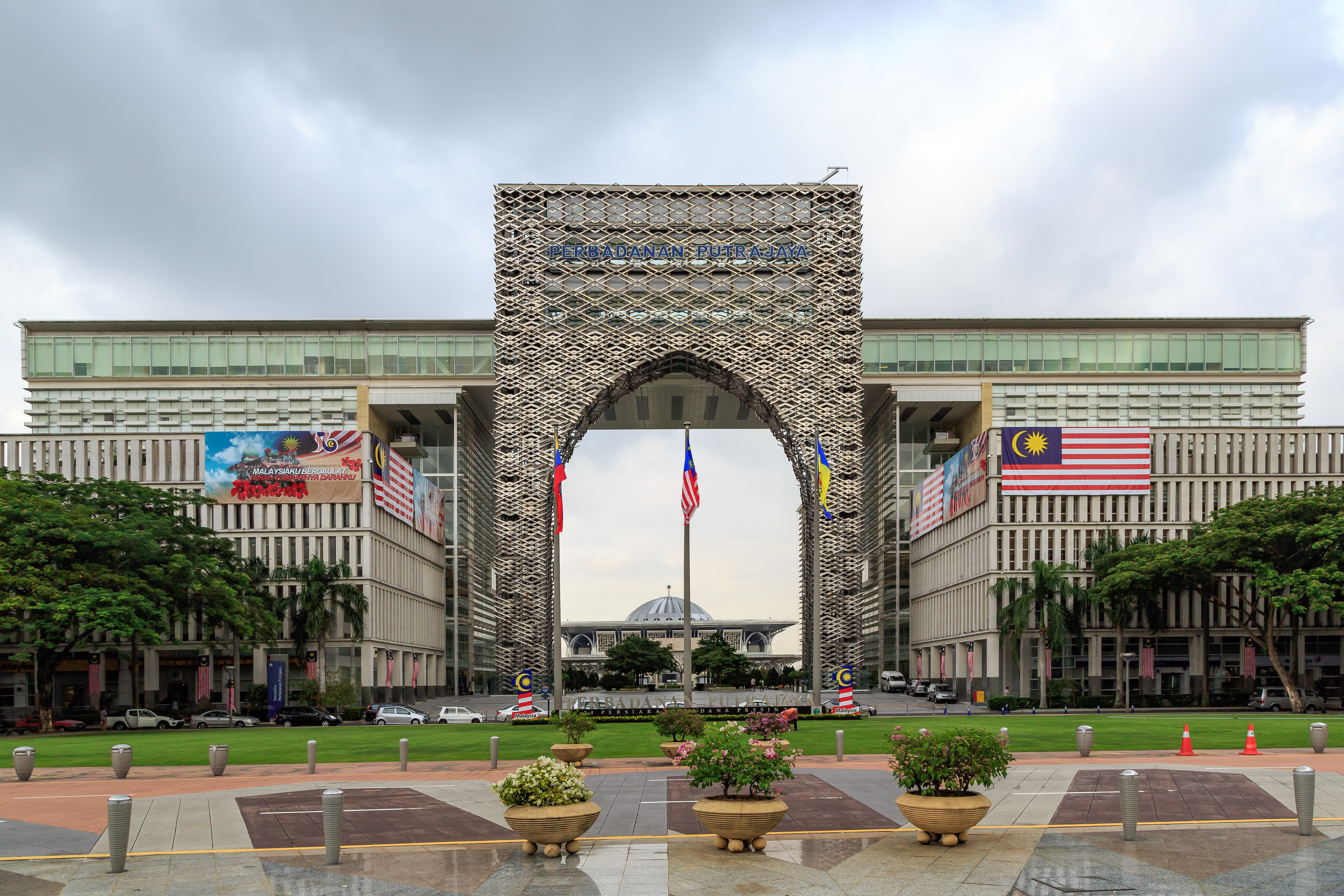
Putrajaya Corporation Complex

Perbadanan Putrajaya (PPj) or Putrajaya Corporation (PjC) is a local authority that administers the Federal Territory of Putrajaya and is under the Department of Federal Territories of Malaysia. Founded in 1995, the corporation is responsible for public health and sanitation, waste removal and management, capital planning, environmental protection and building control, social and economic development, and the general maintenance functions of the urban infrastructure of Putrajaya. The main headquarters of the PPj is located at Precinct 3, Persiaran Perdana, Putrajaya.

Putrajaya Corporation is also the operator of Nadi Putra bus services, which operates in the urban areas of Putrajaya, Cyberjaya, Kuala Lumpur and parts of the Southern Klang Valley. Putrajaya is now a metered parking area, and the corporation will issue a summons for illegal parking.

== Presidents ==
No.	President	Term start	Term end
1	Azizan Zainul Abidin	1 March 1996	14 July 2004
2	Samsudin Osman	1 August 2004	31 July 2012
3	Aseh Che Mat	1 August 2012	31 July 2015
4	Hasim Ismail	1 August 2015	31 July 2018
5	Aminuddin Hassim	1 October 2018	30 September 2020
6	Muhammad Azmi Mohd Zain	1 October 2020	15 December 2021
7	Fadlun Mak Ujud	1 June 2022	14 November 2025
8	Mohd Sakeri Abdul Kadir	15 November 2025	Incumbent

== Board members ==
Board of Putrajaya Corporation is responsible to make highest decision of policy in Putrajaya Corporation. It is led by a chairman who holds a concurrent post of Putrajaya Corporation President.

No.	Member	Membership	Position and Agency	Appointment Period
1	YBhg. Dato’ Mohd Sakeri bin Abdul Kadir	Chairman	Putrajaya Corporation President	2 years
2	Tengku Dato' Setia Ramli Alhaj bin Tengku Shahruddin Shah Alhaj	Representative of state of Selangor	Selangor Council of the Royal Court member	3 years
3	Dato' Setia Haji Mohammed Khusrin bin Haji Munawi	Representative of state of Selangor	Selangor Council of the Royal Court member	3 years
4	Dato' Shahrol Anuwar bin Saman	Representative of Federal Government	National Budget Director, Ministry of Finance	2 years
5	Dato' Nor Azmie bin Diron	Representative of Federal Government	Secretary General, Ministry of Economy	2 years
6	Datuk Nor Muhamad bin Che Dan @ Che Din	Representative of Federal Government	Secretary of Development Management Division, Department of Federal Territories	2 years
7	Dr. Aminuddin Sham bin Tajudin	Representative of private sector		2 years
8	Muhammad Fikri bin Khalid @ Abdul Aziz	Representative of private sector		2 years

== Executive departments ==
The president is the highest executive officer of Putrajaya Corporation. The president is assisted by 8 deputy presidents who lead 8 departments in Putrajaya Corporation. Each department consists of several divisions and each division is led by a director.

No.	Departments (in Malay)	Departments (in English)
1	Jabatan Undang-Undang: Bahagian Undang-Undang	Legal Department: Legal Division
2	Jabatan Audit dan Risiko: Bahagian Audit Dalam	Audit and Risk Department: Internal Audit Division
3	Jabatan Perkhidmatan Korporat: Bahagian Sumber Manusia; Bahagian Pentadbiran; Bahagian Teknologi Maklumat dan Komunikasi; Bahagian Komunikasi Korporat; Bahagain Pengurusan Strategik; Bahagian Komersial dan Pelaburan	Corporate Services Department: Human Resources Division; Administration Division; Information Technology and Communication Division; Corporate Communication Division; Strategic Management Division; Commercial and Investment Division
4	Jabatan Perkhidmatan Bandar: Bahagian Perkhidmatan Komuniti dan Sukan; Bahagian Pelesenan; Bahagian Kesihatan Persekitaran; Bahagian Penguatkuasa	Urban Service Department: Community and Sports Service Division; Licensing Division; Environmental Health Division; Enforcement Division
5	Jabatan Kejuruteraan dan Penyelenggaraan: Bahagian Pengurusan Projek; Bahagian Jalan; Bahagian Pengurusan Fasiliti; Bahagian Trafik dan Pengangkutan Awam	Engineering and Maintenance Department: Project Management Division; Road Division; Facility Management Division; Traffic and Public Transportation Division
6	Jabatan Perancangan Bandar: Bahagian Kawalan Perancangan dan Pembangunan; Bahagian Pembangunan Mampan dan Perumahan; Bahagian Alam Sekitar, Tasik dan Wetland; Bahagian Kawalan Bangunan dan Rekabentuk Bandar	Urban Planning Department: Planning and Development Control Division; Sustainable Development and Housing Division; Environment, Lake, and Wetland Division; Building Control and Urban Design Division
7	Jabatan Landskap dan Taman: Bahagian Perancangan dan Pembangunan Taman; Bahagian Rekreasi dan Operasi; Bahagian Pengurusan dan Penyelenggaraan Landskap; Bahagian Botani; Bahagian Hortikultur dan Pertanian Bandar	Landscape and Park Department: Park Planning and Development Division; Recreation and Operation Division; Landscape Management and Maintenance Division; Botany Division; Urban Horticulture and Agriculture Division
8	Jabatan Kewangan: Bahagian Pengurusan Kewangan; Bahagian Penilaian dan Pesuruhjaya Bangunan; Bahagian Anak Syarikat, Kawalan Kredit dan Hasil	Financial Department: Financial Management Division; Valuation and Commissioner of Buildings Division; Subsidiary Companies, Credit Control, and Revenue Division

== See also ==
- Local government in Malaysia
- List of local governments in Malaysia
- Department of Federal Territories
- Putrajaya
