= Land Public Transport Agency =

Malaysian government body

- Agensi Pengangkutan Awam Darat (APAD) 陆路公共交通机构

Commission overview
- Formed: 4 June 2010; 16 years ago
- Preceding agencies: Commercial Vehicles Licensing Board (Except Sabah, Sarawak and Labuan); Department of Railways; Tourism Vehicles Licensing Function of the Ministry of Tourism
- Dissolved: 23 May 2018; 8 years ago (SPAD)
- Superseding commission: Agensi Pengangkutan Awam Darat (APAD) (absorbed into Ministry of Transport)
- Jurisdiction: Government of Malaysia
- Headquarters: Kuala Lumpur Sentral, 50470 Kuala Lumpur
- Commission executives: Syed Hamid Albar (2010-2017), Chairman; Mohd Isa Abdul Samad (2017-2018), Acting Chairman
- Website: www.spad.gov.my

The Land Public Transport Agency (Malay: Agensi Pengangkutan Awam Darat, Chinese: 陆路公共交通机构), Abbr.: APAD, previously as known as Land Public Transport Commission (Malay: Suruhanjaya Pengangkutan Awam Darat), Abbr.: SPAD, was a Malaysian statutory body set up to plan for, regulate and enforce rules concerning land-based public and freight transport in Malaysia from 2010 to 2018. In lieu of this Commission, the public and freight transports rules and operations in Sabah, Sarawak and Labuan were continue to be operated by the Commercial Vehicle Licensing Board (Malay: Lembaga Pelesenan Kenderaan Pengangkutan; LPKP). In 2018, the SPAD was dissolved and rebranded as the Land Public Transport Agency (Malay: Agensi Pengangkutan Awam Darat: Abbr, APAD) which was absorbed into Ministry of Transport.

== Formation ==
The commission was set up through the Suruhanjaya Pengangkutan Awam Darat Act 2010 (lit. 'Land Public Transport Commission Act 2010') [Act 714] which was passed by the Malaysian Parliament in May 2010. The commission's powers were derived from another legislation, namely the Land Public Transport Act 2010 [Act 715], which was passed at the same time. The Suruhanjaya Pengangkutan Awam Darat Act 2010 came into force on 3 June 2010, making it the official day of establishment of the Commission.

The first Chairman of the Commission was Syed Hamid Albar while the chief executive officer of the Commission was Mohd Nur Ismal Mohamed Kamal. Both were appointed by Malaysian Prime Minister Najib Abdul Razak and their appointments were effective 3 June 2010.

On 19 June 2017, Mohd Isa Abdul Samad was picked as the new acting SPAD chairman after he had resigned as Felda Global Ventures Holdings (FGV) chairman.

== Responsibilities ==
SPAD plans, regulates and enforces all matters relating to Public Land transport and has jurisdiction over Peninsula Malaysia. The Commercial Vehicles Licensing Board, Department of Railways and the Ministry of Tourism continue to exercise their respective powers in Sabah and Sarawak.

=== Policy and Planning ===
The Policy, Planning and Research Division’s main function is to motivate demand in public transport among the masses through the provision of a user-friendly and sustainable public transport ecosystem. SPAD's National Public Land Transport Master Plan was released in September 2012.

=== Enforcement ===
SPAD has its own enforcement officers. Their powers to carry out enforcement work are derived from the Public Land Transport Act 2010. The duties of SPAD enforcement officers include inspection of public transport and freight vehicles to ensure that they are road worthy, and have valid licenses and other documents; inspection of drivers, conductors and co-drivers to ensure that they are fit; inspection of travel tickets; and the clamping down on touting and soliciting. SPAD enforcement officers work hand-in-hand with enforcement officers from other agencies such as the Road Transport Department (RTD) and the Royal Malaysian Police (RMP).

== National Public Land Transport Master Plan ==
SPAD released the National Public Land Transport Master Plan in September 2012. It is a 20-year master plan aimed at both the national and regional levels. The strategic objectives outlined in the master plan are as follows:

- Physical connectivity to encourage the use of public transport;
- Affordability and accessibility so that public transport is available to all walks of life;
- High service level, quality and convenience to meet the public's expectations of service, reliability and all-round user-friendliness;
- Safety and security so that the public can be assured of their personal safety while using public transport; and
- Better quality of life by aspiring towards a clean and green environment.

== Dissolution ==
After the 2018 general election that saw the downfall of BN government, on 23 May 2018 new Prime Minister Dr. Mahathir Mohamad of the new Pakatan Harapan (PH) coalition federal government announced that the SPAD was among few government departments that will be abolished. Transport Minister Anthony Loke told Mohd Isa to resign from SPAD chairman within a week. Mohd Isa resigned as SPAD chairman on 29 May 2018.

SPAD was dissolved and rebranded as Agensi Pengangkutan Awam Darat (APAD) which was absorbed into Ministry of Transport.
