= Persiaran Perdana, Putrajaya =

Road in Malaysia

Persiaran Perdana
- Putrajaya Boulevard

Route information
- Existed: 1997–present
- History: Completed in 2002

Major junctions
- North end: Dataran Putra
- South end: Dataran Gemilang

Location
- Country: Malaysia
- Primary destinations: Perdana Putra; Masjid Putra; Palace of Justice; Putrajaya International Convention Centre (PICC)

Highway system
- Highways in Malaysia; Expressways; Federal; State

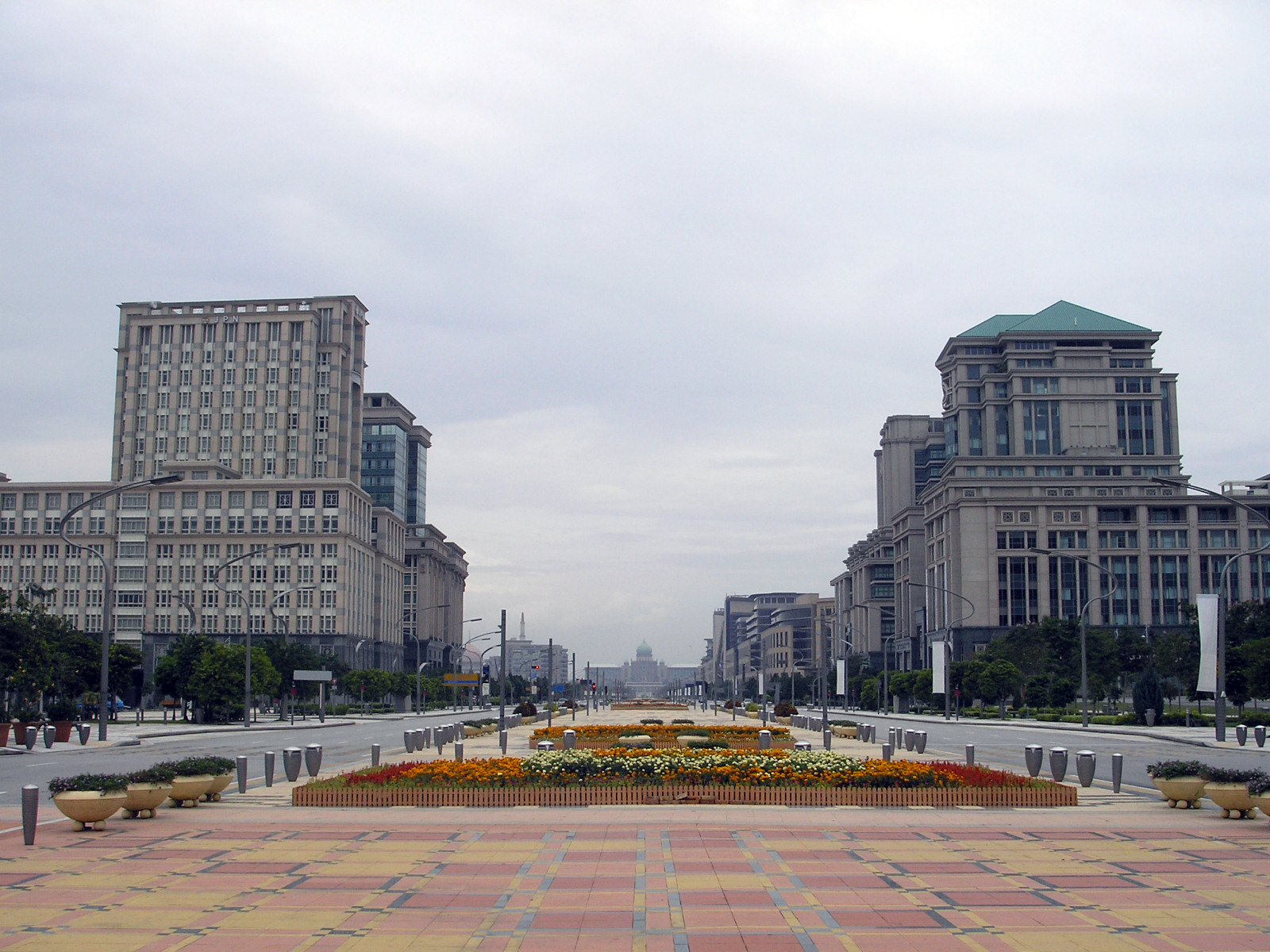
Persiaran Perdana (Putrajaya Boulevard)

Persiaran Perdana or Putrajaya Boulevard is the longest boulevard in Putrajaya, Malaysia, connecting Dataran Putra in the north to the Dataran Gemilang in the south.

== Putrajaya Street Circuit ==
This is also the location of the start-and-finish straight of the Putrajaya Street Circuit designed by British architect Simon Gibbons to be used during the second round of the 2014–15 Formula E season.

Putrajaya Formula E Circuit

== Lists of junctions ==
km	Exit	Junctions	To	Remarks
		Dataran Putra	North; Perdana Putra building West; Masjid Putra; Souq	Roundabout square
Dataran Putra (Putra Square)
Persiaran Perdana (Putrajaya Boulevard)
		Putra Bridge; Putrajaya Lake		Start/End of bridge
		Putra Bridge; Putrajaya Lake		
		Putra Bridge; Putrajaya Lake		Start/End of bridge
		Putra Bridge Roundabout	West; Menara Seri Wilayah (formerly Menara PJH Holdings); Ministry of the Federal Territories main headquarters	Roundabout
		Royal Malaysian Customs main headquarters		
		MOF Junctions	West; Lebuh Seri Wawasan; Seri Wawasan Bridge; Lebuh Sentosa; Presint 7 until 11 East; Malaysian Ministry of Finance main headquarters	Junctions
Dataran Wawasan (Vision Square)
		Dataran Wawasan	Malaysian Ministry of Finance main headquarters	Square
Dataran Wawasan (Vision Square)
		Lebuh Ehsan Junctions	Lebuh Ehsan West; Putrajaya Millennium Monument East; Seri Bestari Bridge; Persiaran Timur; Presint—until -- Wisma Putra	Junctions
		Ministry of Entrepreneur and Co-operative Development main headquarters		
Dataran Putrajaya (Putrajaya Square)
		Dataran Putrajaya	West; Perbadanan Putrajaya complex East; Palace of Justice	Square
Dataran Putrajaya (Putrajaya Square)
		Jalan Kemerdekaan Junctions	Jalan Kemerdekaan West; Tuanku Mizan Zainal Abidin Mosque East; Presint 18	Junctions
		Ministry of Agriculture and Agro Base Industries		
		Wisma Tani		
		Ministry of Youth and Sports main headquarters		
		Lebuh Seri Setia Junctions	Lebuh Seri Setia West; Tuanku Mizan Zainal Abidin Mosque East; Seri Setia Bridge; Lebuh Wadi Ehsan; Presint—until --	Junctions
Dataran Rakyat (People's Square)
		Dataran Rakyat		
Dataran Rakyat (People's Square)
		Lebuh Sentosa Junctions	West; Lebuh Sentosa; Seri Saujana Bridge; Presint 6 until 11; Cyberjaya; Shah Alam; Kuala Lumpur International Airport (KLIA)	Junctions
		AGC Building		
Persiaran Perdana (Putrajaya Boulevard)
Dataran Gemilang (Gemilang Square)
		Dataran Gemilang		Roundabout square
Dataran Gemilang (Gemilang Square)
Lebuh Seri Gemilang
			South; Lebuh Seri Gemilang; Seri Gemilang Bridge; Putrajaya International Convention Centre (PICC)	
