= Persiaran Sultan Salahuddin Abdul Aziz Shah, Putrajaya =

Road in Malaysia

Persiaran Sultan Salahuddin Abdul Aziz Shah
- Putrajaya Roundabout
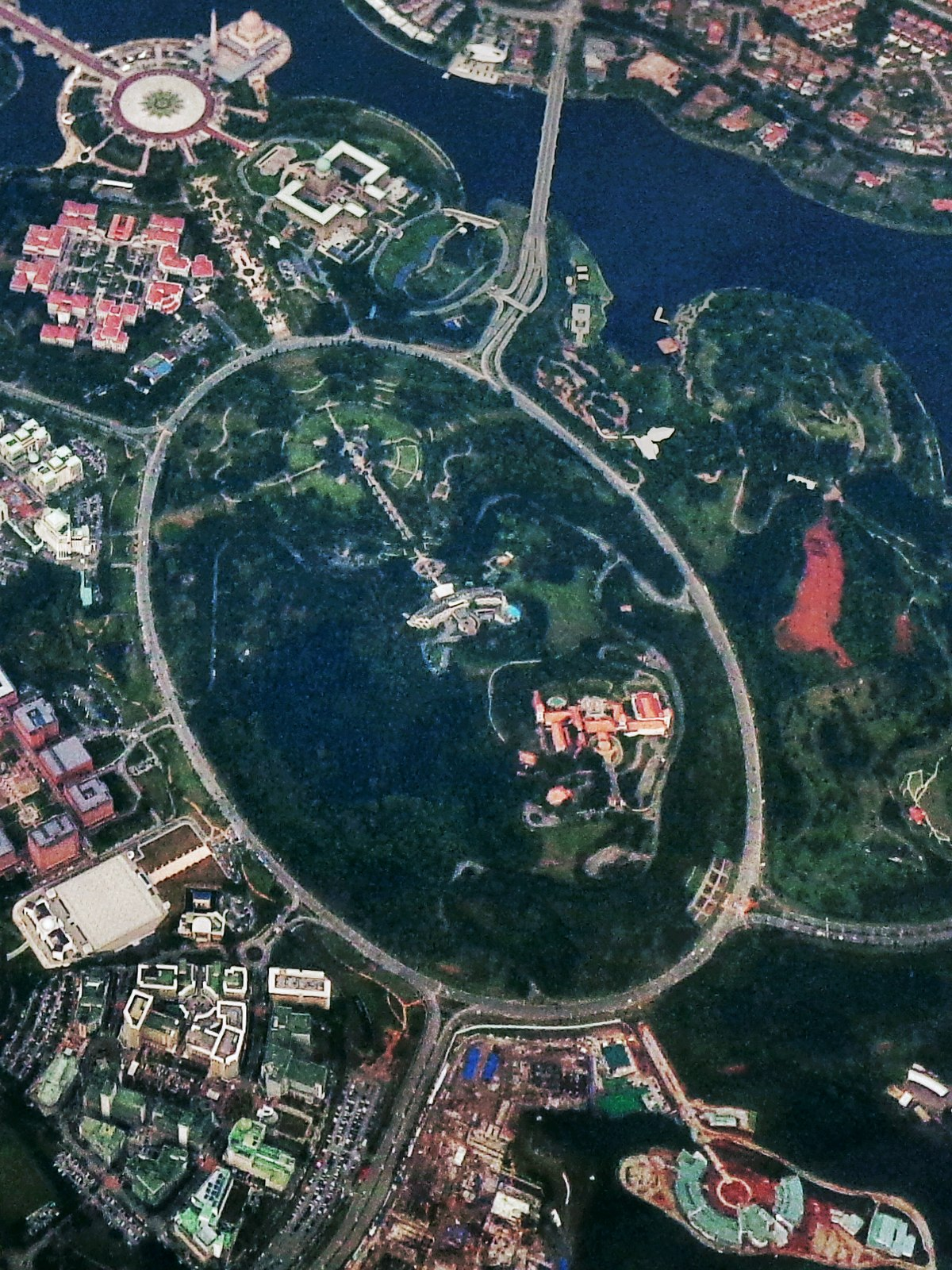

Route information
- Length: 3.5 km (2.2 mi)
- Existed: 1997–present
- History: Completed in 1999

Major junctions
- Beltway around Taman Putra Perdana, Precinct 1, Putrajaya
- Persiaran Persekutuan; Lebuh Perdana Timur; Lebuh Perdana Selatan; Lebuh Perdana Barat

Location
- Country: Malaysia
- Primary destinations: Federal Government Complex (Parcel A until E); Perdana Putra; Putra Mosque; Putrajaya Independence Square; Taman Perdana Putra

Highway system
- Highways in Malaysia; Expressways; Federal; State

Persiaran Sultan Salahuddin Abdul Aziz Shah or Putrajaya Roundabout is the main thoroughfare or roundabout in Putrajaya, Malaysia. It is world's largest roundabout with a circumference of 3.5 km (2.2 miles). It was named after Almarhum Sultan Salahuddin Abdul Aziz Shah of Selangor, the eleventh Yang di-Pertuan Agong. Major landmarks in Putrajaya including the Federal Government Complex (Parcel A until D), Perdana Putra, the Putrajaya Independence Square and Putra Mosque are located along this road.

== Lists of interchanges ==
Km	Exit	Interchange	To	Remarks
		Persiaran Persekutuan Exit	North; Persiaran Persekutuan; Kuala Lumpur; Kajang	LILO exit
		Parcel F	Parcel F	LILO exit Under planning
		Istana Melawati	Istana Melawati	RIRO exit National Palace
		Lebuh Perdana Timur Exit	East; Lebuh Perdana Timur; Presint 14 until 16; Presint Diplomatik; Bangi; Kajang; Alamanda Putrajaya	LILO exit
		Parcel E	Parcel E Election Commission of Malaysia; Department of Civil Aviation (DCA); Ministry of Health (Kementerian Kesihatan Malaysia)	LILO exit
		Taman Putra Perdana	Taman Putra Perdana; Putrajaya Landmark; Shangri-La Hotel; V	RIRO exit
		National Heroes Square	National Heroes Square	Public square
		Parcel D	Parcel D Jabatan Kemajuan Islam Malaysia (Islamic Religious Department); Kementerian Pengangkutan Malaysia (Ministry of Transport); Jabatan Pengangkutan Jalan (Malaysian Road Transport Department); Kementerian Sumber Manusia (Ministry of Human Resource); Kementerian Keselamatan Dalam Negeri (Ministry of Home Affairs); Kementerian Kemajuan Luar Bandar dan Wilayah (Ministry of Rural Development)	LILO exit
		Parcel C	Parcel C Jabatan Perkhidmatan Awam Malaysia (Malaysian Public Service Department); Suruhanjaya Perkhidmatan Awam Malaysia (Malaysian Public Service Commission); Jabatan Alam Sekitar (Department of Environment); Jabatan Perangkaan Malaysia (Department of Statistics)	LILO exit
		Lebuh Perdana Selatan Exit	South; Lebuh Perdana Selatan; Seri Bakti Bridge; Presint 16 until 18; Agriculture Heritage Park; Wisma Putra; Seri Satria	LILO exit
		Parcel B	Parcel B Kompleks Jabatan Perdana Menteri (Prime Minister's Department Complex); Malaysian Administrative Modernisation and Management Planning Unit (MAMPU)	LILO exit
		Putra Square	Southwest; Putra Square; Putra Mosque; Putra Bridge; Persiaran Perdana (Putrajaya Boulevard); V	LILO exit
		Perdana Putra Building	Perdana Putra Building	LILO exit Restricted area
		Lebuh Perdana Barat Exit	West; Lebuh Perdana Barat; Seri Perdana Bridge; Presint 7 until 11; Seri Perdana	LILO exit
		Taman Botani	Taman Botani; V	LILO exit
		Taman Putra Perdana	Taman Putra Perdana; Putrajaya Landmark; Shangri-La Hotel; V	RIRO exit
		Persiaran Persekutuan Exit	North; Persiaran Persekutuan; Kuala Lumpur; Kajang	LILO exit
