= Putrajaya Ring Road =

Road in Malaysia

Federal Route 30
- Putrajaya Ring Road; Persiaran Selatan

Route information
- Maintained by Malaysian Public Works Department
- Length: 12.10 km (7.52 mi)
- Existed: 1997–present
- History: Completed in 2003

Major junctions
- North end: Persiaran Timur Interchange
- Persiaran Timur; Lebuh Ehsan; Lebuh Wadi Ehsan; FT 29 Putrajaya–Cyberjaya Expressway
- Southwest end: Cyberjaya South Interchange

Location
- Country: Malaysia
- Primary destinations: Taman Pinggiran Putra, Taman Selatan, Putrajaya International Convention Centre, Cyberjaya

Highway system
- Highways in Malaysia; Expressways; Federal; State

Putrajaya Ring Road (Malay: Jalan Lingkaran Bandar) or Federal Route 30, comprising Persiaran Selatan, is a major highway in Putrajaya, Malaysia. It connects Cyberjaya South Interchange in the west to Persiaran Timur interchange in the north.

== Overview ==
=== Persiaran Selatan ===
Persiaran Selatan is a major highway in Putrajaya, Malaysia. It connects Cyberjaya South Interchange in the west to Lebuh Wadi Ehsan interchange in the east.

== History ==
On 21 October 2020, the entire Persiaran Selatan was gazetted as part of Federal Route 30, make the entire length of Putrajaya Ring Road becomes 12.10 km (7.52 mi).

== Features ==
Most sections of the Federal Route 30 were built under the JKR R5 road standard, with a speed limit of 90 kilometres per hour (56 mph).

Some sections have motorcycle lanes.

== Junction lists ==
Legend:

- I/C - Interchange, I/S - Intersection, RSA - Rest and service area, OBR - Overhead bridge restaurant, R/R - Restaurant and rest plaza, L/B - Layby, V/P - Vista point, TN - tunnel, T/P - Toll plaza, BR - Bridge
- C - Cloverleaf, S - Stack, T-A - Trumpet-A, T-B - Trumpet-B, DT - Directional-T/Y, SDT - Semi-Directional-T/Y, P-Y - Partial-Y, D - Diamond, P-C - Partial cloverleaf, D-D - Diverging diamond, D-R - Direct ramp

State/territory	District	Location	km	mi	Exit	Name	Destinations	Notes
Putrajaya	N/A	Presint 15			Through to Persiaran Timur			
Putrajaya	N/A	Presint 15	0.0	0.0	3001	Persiaran Timur I/C	Persiaran Timur – Agriculture Heritage Park, Government office, Perdana Putra Building, Putra Mosque, Wisma Putra	Interchange, from/to Kajang only
Selangor	Sepang	Desa Putra			3002	Lebuh Ehsan I/C	Lebuh Ehsan – Taman Pinggiran Putra, Presint --, Dengkil, Bangi	Cloverleaf interchange
Selangor	Sepang	Desa Putra			Bridge			
Putrajaya	N/A	Presint 20			3003	Lebuh Wadi Ehsan I/C	Lebuh Wadi Ehsan – Government office, Perdana Putra Building, Putra Mosque, Wisma Putra, Agriculture Heritage Park	Interchange
Putrajaya	N/A	Presint 20				Lebuh Gemilang (East) I/C	Lebuh Gemilang – Putrajaya International Convention Centre (PICC) – Persiaran Perdana (Putrajaya Boulevard), Government office, Taman Seri Empangan, Putrajaya Fish Grill Spot, Kedai Rakyat MAIWP; Jalan P20/A (Taman Selatan) – Muslim Cemetery, Pusara Negarawan, Crematorium, Chinese Cemetery, Hindu Cemetery, Christian Cemetery, General Cemetery	Diamond interchange
Putrajaya	N/A	Presint 20				Lebuh Gemilang (West) I/C	Lebuh Gemilang – Putrajaya International Convention Centre (PICC), Persiaran Perdana (Putrajaya Boulevard), Government office, Putrajaya Maritime Centre, Pullman Putrajaya Lakeside, Putrajaya Challenge Park (Taman Cabaran)	Trumpet interchange
Selangor	Sepang	Cyberjaya				Cyberjaya South I/C	FT 29 Putrajaya–Cyberjaya Expressway – Kuala Lumpur, Petaling Jaya, Puchong, Subang Jaya, Shah Alam, Dengkil, Sepang, Kuala Lumpur International Airport (KLIA)	Cloverleaf interchange
Selangor	Sepang	Cyberjaya				Cyberjaya	Incompleted road	Under construction
1.000 mi = 1.609 km; 1.000 km = 0.621 mi: Incomplete access; Route transition; Unopened
