= Persiaran Persekutuan, Putrajaya =

Road in Malaysia

Persiaran Persekutuan

Route information
- Maintained by Putrajaya Corporation
- Existed: 1997–present
- History: Completed in 1999

Major junctions
- North end: Wetland Interchange; South Klang Valley Expressway
- South Klang Valley Expressway; Persiaran Utara; Persiaran Sultan Salahuddin Abdul Aziz Shah
- South end: Persiaran Sultan Salahuddin Abdul Aziz Shah

Location
- Country: Malaysia
- Primary destinations: Putrajaya

Highway system
- Highways in Malaysia; Expressways; Federal; State

Persiaran Persekutuan is a major highway in Putrajaya, Malaysia. It connects Wetland Interchange of the South Klang Valley Expressway in the north to Persiaran Sultan Salahuddin Abdul Aziz Shah in the south.

== Junction lists ==
The entire route is located in Putrajaya.

Legend:

- I/C - Interchange, I/S - Intersection, RSA - Rest and service area, OBR - Overhead bridge restaurant, R/R - Restaurant and rest plaza, L/B - Layby, V/P - Vista point, TN - tunnel, T/P - Toll plaza, BR - Bridge
- C - Cloverleaf, S - Stack, T-A - Trumpet-A, T-B - Trumpet-B, DT - Directional-T/Y, SDT - Semi-Directional-T/Y, P-Y - Partial-Y, D - Diamond, P-C - Partial cloverleaf, D-D - Diverging diamond, D-R - Direct ramp

State/territory	District	Location	km	mi	Exit	Name	Destinations	Notes
Selangor	Sepang	Serdang			2604	Wetland-SKVE I/C	South Klang Valley Expressway – Pulau Indah, Banting, Klang, Cyberjaya, Kuala Lumpur International Airport (KLIA), Puchong, Shah Alam, Kajang, Semenyih, Kuala Lumpur, Seremban	Trumpet interchange
Selangor	Sepang	Serdang			Railway crossing bridge			
Selangor-FT Putrajaya border					Police post			
Putrajaya	Presint 13	Wetlands			Taman Wetlands			
Putrajaya	Presint 13	Wetlands			Wetlands Bridge			
Putrajaya	Presint 13	Wetlands				Wetlands I/C	Persiaran Utara – Shah Alam, Kuala Lumpur International Airport (KLIA) , Presint—until --, Kajang, Kuala Lumpur	Interchange
Putrajaya	Presint 1	Putra Perdana Park			Arch			
Putrajaya	Presint 1	Putra Perdana Park				Persiaran SAAS Thoroughfare	Persiaran Sultan Salahuddin Abdul Aziz Shah – Alamanda Putrajaya, Government office, Perdana Putra Building, Putra Mosque, Putra Bridge, Seri Perdana	
1.000 mi = 1.609 km; 1.000 km = 0.621 mi
