= Persiaran Timur, Putrajaya =

Road in Malaysia

Persiaran Timur

Route information
- Existed: 1997–present
- History: Completed in 2003

Major junctions
- North end: Persiaran Utara interchange
- Persiaran Utara; Lebuh Perdana Timur; FT 30 Putrajaya Ring Road; Lebuh Bestari; Lebuh Wadi Ehsan
- South end: Lebuh Wadi Ehsan interchange

Location
- Country: Malaysia
- Primary destinations: Putrajaya; Precinct Diplomatic

Highway system
- Highways in Malaysia; Expressways; Federal; State

Persiaran Timur is a major highway in Putrajaya, Malaysia. It connect Persiaran Utara interchange in the north to Seri Setia interchange in the south.

== Lists of interchanges ==
Km	Exit	Interchange	To	Remarks
		Persiaran Utara Interchange	Persiaran Utara West; Presint—until -- Seri Perdana; Puchong; Shah Alam East; Kuala Lumpur; Kajang	Trumpet interchange
Persiaran Utara
Persiaran Timur
		Lebuh Perdana Timur Interchange	Lebuh Perdana Timur West; Presint -- Government office Perdana Putra Building; Putra Mosque East; Presint -- Presint Diplomatik (Diplomatic Enclave)	Diamond interchange
		Alamanda Putrajaya	West; Jalan Alamanda 2 Alamanda Putrajaya	
		Persiaran Selatan Interchange	South; FT 30 Putrajaya Ring Road; Taman Pinggiran Putra; Dengkil; Bangi	Interchange
		Lebuh Bestari Interchange	Lebuh Bestari West; Presint -- Government office Perdana Putra Building; Putra Mosque; Wisma Putra; Agriculture Heritage Park EAST; Presint 17	Diamond interchange
		Lebuh Ehsan Interchange	East; Lebuh Ehsan; Presint --	Diamond interchange
		Lebuh Wadi Ehsan Interchange	West; Lebuh Wadi Ehsan; Persiaran Selatan; Cyberjaya; FT 31 Dengkil; FT 29 Kuala Lumpur International Airport (KLIA); Putrajaya International Convention Centre (PICC); Taman Selatan	Interchange
Persiaran Timur
Lebuh Seri Setia
			West; Lebuh Seri Setia; Seri Setia Bridge; Government office Persiaran Perdana	
