= Lebuh Wadi Ehsan =

Road in Malaysia

Route information
- Existed: 1997–present
- History: Completed in 2003

Major junctions
- North end: Lebuh Seri Setia interchange
- Persiaran Timur; Persiaran Selatan
- South end: Persiaran Selatan interchange

Location
- Country: Malaysia
- Primary destinations: Putrajaya

Highway system
- Highways in Malaysia; Expressways; Federal; State

Lebuh Wadi Ehsan is a major highway in Putrajaya, Malaysia. It connects Lebuh Seri Setia interchange in the north to Persiaran Selatan interchange in the south.

== Lists of interchanges ==
Km	Exit	Interchange	To	Remarks
			North; Persiaran Timur; Kuala Lumpur; Kajang; Alamanda Putrajaya	Interchange
Persiaran Utara
Lebuh Wadi Ehsan
		Lebuh Seri Setia Interchange	West; Lebuh Seri Setia; Seri Setia Bridge; Government office Persiaran Perdana	Interchange
		Semenyih Water Treatment Plant		
		Putrajaya Dam		
Lebuh Wadi Ehsan
Persiaran Utara
		Persiaran Selatan Interchange	Southwest; Persiaran Selatan; Cyberjaya; FT 31 Dengkil; FT 29 Kuala Lumpur International Airport (KLIA); Putrajaya International Convention Centre (PICC); Taman Selatan	Interchange
