= Lebuh Sentosa, Putrajaya =

Road in Malaysia

Lebuh Sentosa

Route information
- Existed: 1997–present
- History: Completed in 2003

Major junctions
- North end: Presint 11
- Persiaran Utara; Persiaran Barat; Persiaran Perdana
- South end: Persiaran Perdana

Location
- Country: Malaysia
- Primary destinations: Presint 8

Highway system
- Highways in Malaysia; Expressways; Federal; State

Lebuh Sentosa is a major highway in Putrajaya, Malaysia. It connects Precinct 11 in the north to the Core Island of Putrajaya in the south.

== Lists of interchanges ==
| km | Exit | Interchange | To | Remarks |
|---|---|---|---|---|
| | | | North; Jalan P11/-- Presint 11 | |
Lebuh Sentosa; Start/End of highway
| | | Persiaran Utara Interchange | Persiaran Utara West; Cyberjaya; Puchong; Shah Alam; Dengkil; Kuala Lumpur International Airport (KLIA) East; Kuala Lumpur; Kajang; Seremban | Half cloverleaf interchange |
| | | Lebuh Perdana Barat Interchange | Lebuh Perdana Barat West; Presint 8 East; Presint 7 Seri Perdana; Government office Perdana Putra Building; Putra Mosque; Putrajaya Landmark | Diamond interchange |
| | | Lebuh Seri Wawasan Interchange | Lebuh Seri Wawasan West; Presint 8 Putrajaya police headquarters Putrajaya fire stations East; Presint 7 Perdana Leadership Foundation; Governmental offices Palace of Justice; Millennium Monument | Diamond interchange |
| | | Hospital Putrajaya | | North bound |
| | | Persiaran Barat Interchange | West; Persiaran Barat; Cyberjaya; Dengkil; North–South Expressway Central Link Putrajaya Link/North-South Expressway Central Link; Ipoh; Shah Alam; USJ; Kuala Lumpur International Airport (KLIA); Johor Bahru; Singapore | Trumpet interchange |
| | | Seri Saujana Bridge | | Start/End of bridge |
| | | Seri Saujana Bridge | | |
| | | Seri Saujana Bridge | | Start/End of bridge |
| | | Jalan Tunku Abdul Rahman Junctions | Jalan Tunku Abdul Rahman North Only; Presint 2 until 4 Putrajaya Millennium Monument; Tuanku Mizan Zainal Abidin Mosque | Junctions |
| | | Jalan Perpaduan Junctions | Jalan Perpaduan | Junctions |
Lebuh Sentosa; Start/End of highway
| | | Persiaran Perdana Junctions | Persiaran Perdana North; Government offices Palace of Justice; Millennium Monument South; Putrajaya International Convention Centre (PICC); Taman Selatan; Dengkil | Junctions |
