= Seri Saujana Bridge =

Seri Saujana Bridge Jambatan Seri Saujana
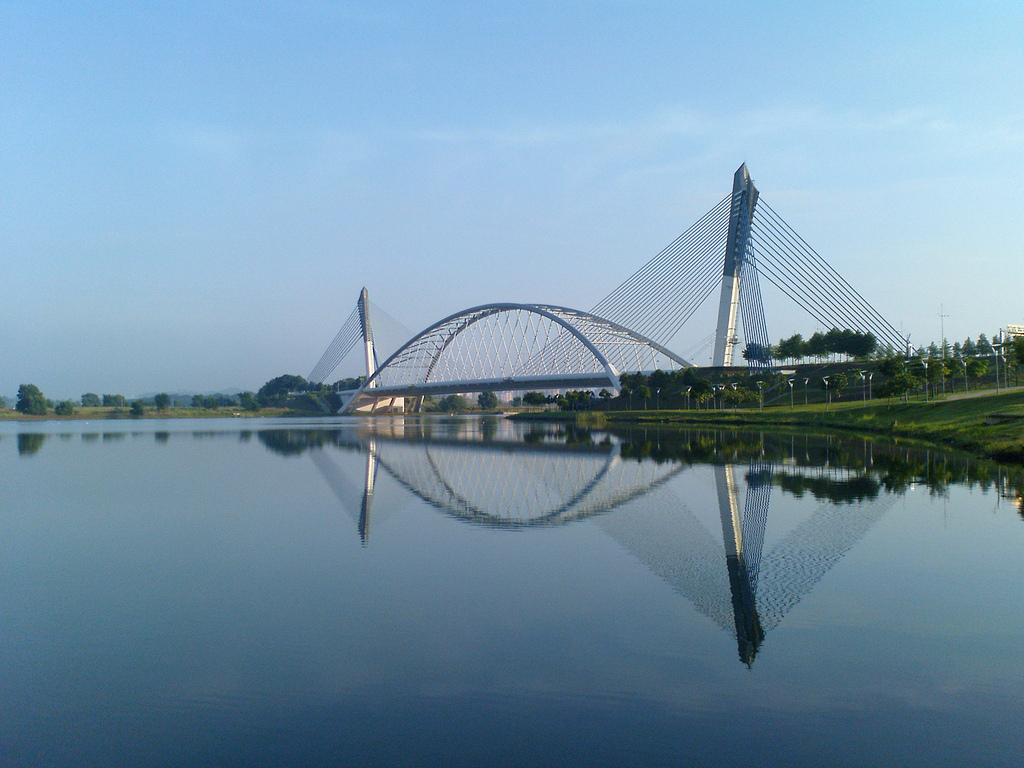
- Coordinates: 2°54′48.6″N 101°40′35.1″E
- Carries: Motor vehicles, Pedestrians
- Crosses: Putrajaya Lake
- Locale: Lebuh Sentosa, Putrajaya, Malaysia
- Official name: Seri Saujana Bridge
- Maintained by: Perbadanan Putrajaya

Characteristics
- Design: symmetric cable-stayed through-arch bridge
- Total length: 300 m
- Width: 32 m
- Longest span: 300 m

History
- Designer: PJS International
- Constructed by: Road Builder (M) Holdings Berhad
- Opened: 2003

Location
- Interactive map of Seri Saujana Bridge

The Seri Saujana Bridge is a main bridge in the planned city Putrajaya, the new (2001) Malaysian federal territory and administrative centre. The bridge's design is a unique combination of a symmetric cable-stayed structure and a through-arch bridge; the through-arch bridge portion is reminiscent of a slender version of the Sydney Harbour Bridge in Sydney, New South Wales, Australia.

The Seri Saujana bridge, also called Bridge No 8, crosses Putrajaya Lake, an artificial lake made to provide natural cooling, and connects the Core Island (Precinct 4) to the Precinct 7 on Lebuh Sentosa highway. It is strategically located at the main entrance into the Core Island from the south, via the upgraded B15 road (now Putrajaya-Cyberjaya Expressway Federal Route 29) and Kuala Lumpur–Putrajaya Expressway, and links the Core Island, where the main government buildings are, with the Kuala Lumpur International Airport.

== Structure ==
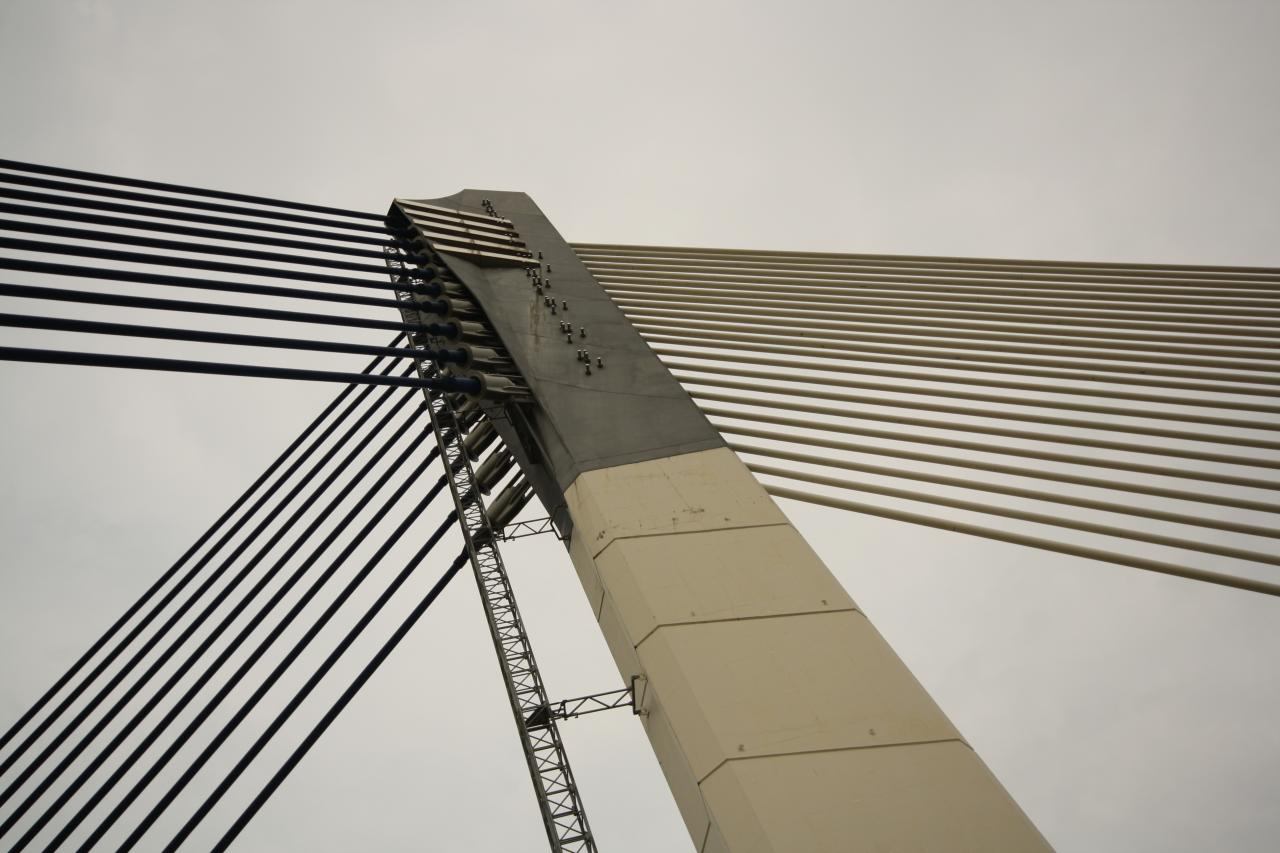
Seri Saujana: 10 pairs of back stay cables in two planes, and 22 main stay cables in one plane

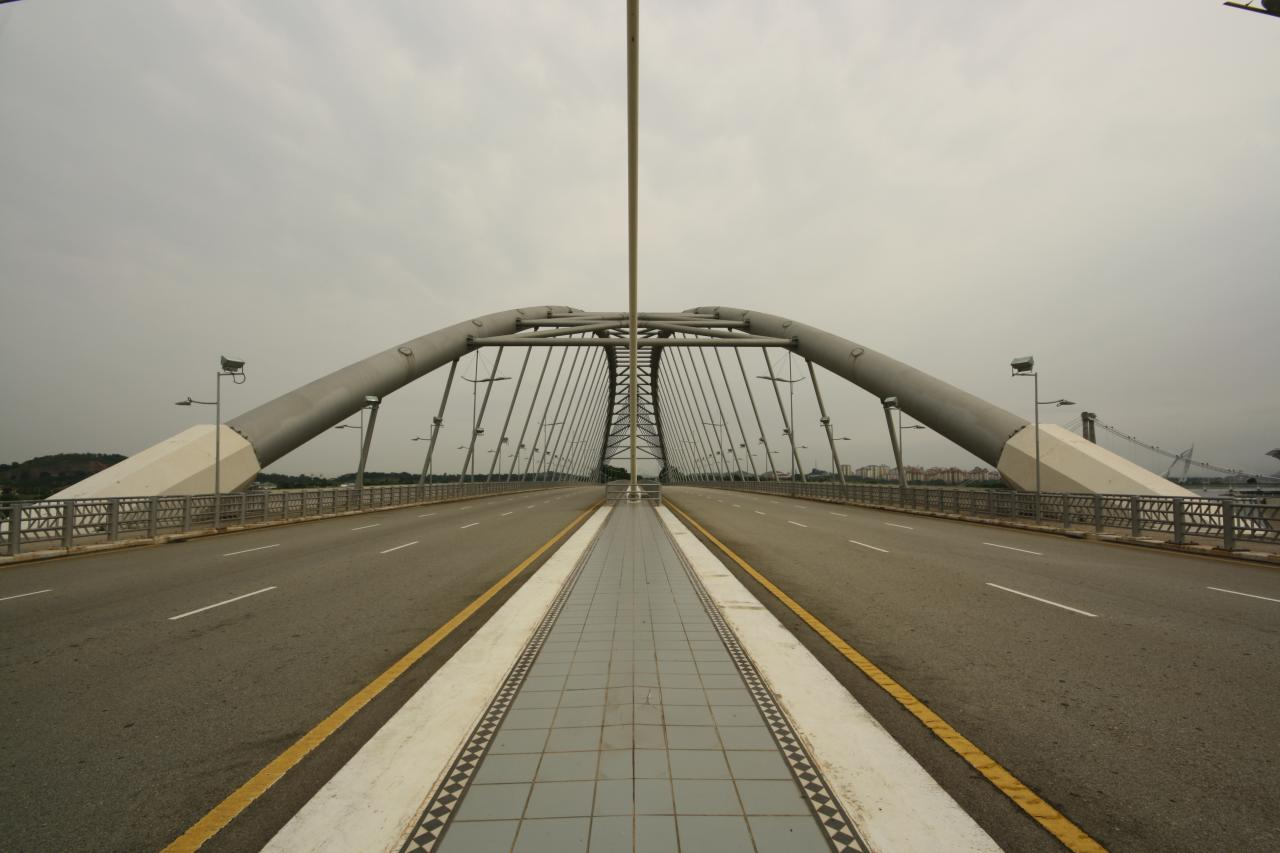
Seri Saujana: main stay cables pick up the middle and hangers from arches pick up the edges of the main-span deck

The Seri Saujana bridge is a new concept of a symmetric cable-stayed through-arch bridge. The bridge was designed by Michael Yamout of PJSI consultants, a Malaysian consulting engineering and architecture firm, as part of series of ten bridges built to access the Core Island within the new governmental city of Putrajaya.

The symmetric cable-stayed system consists of two single column pylons, each inclined away from the main span at an angle of 78°, held by 10 pairs of back stays spread into two planes, and 22 main stay cables in one plane anchored on and pick up the middle spine of the main-span deck. The through-arch system, on the other hand, employs inclined hangers (from arches) anchored on and pick up the outer edges of the main-span deck. With support at the middle and the outer edges, the main-span bridge deck can be made relatively lightweight and slender.

The bridge is controlled by the principal design parameters to reflect a transparent, elegant and futuristic slender looking structure, with an overall single span of 300m and total width of 32m. There are dual three lane carriageways. The deck level varies from RL 35.25m at abutment to RL 35m at centre of the bridge.

The builder of this bridge was Road Builder (M) Sdn Bhd at a cost of US$20 million. It was opened on 31 May 2003.

== Gallery ==
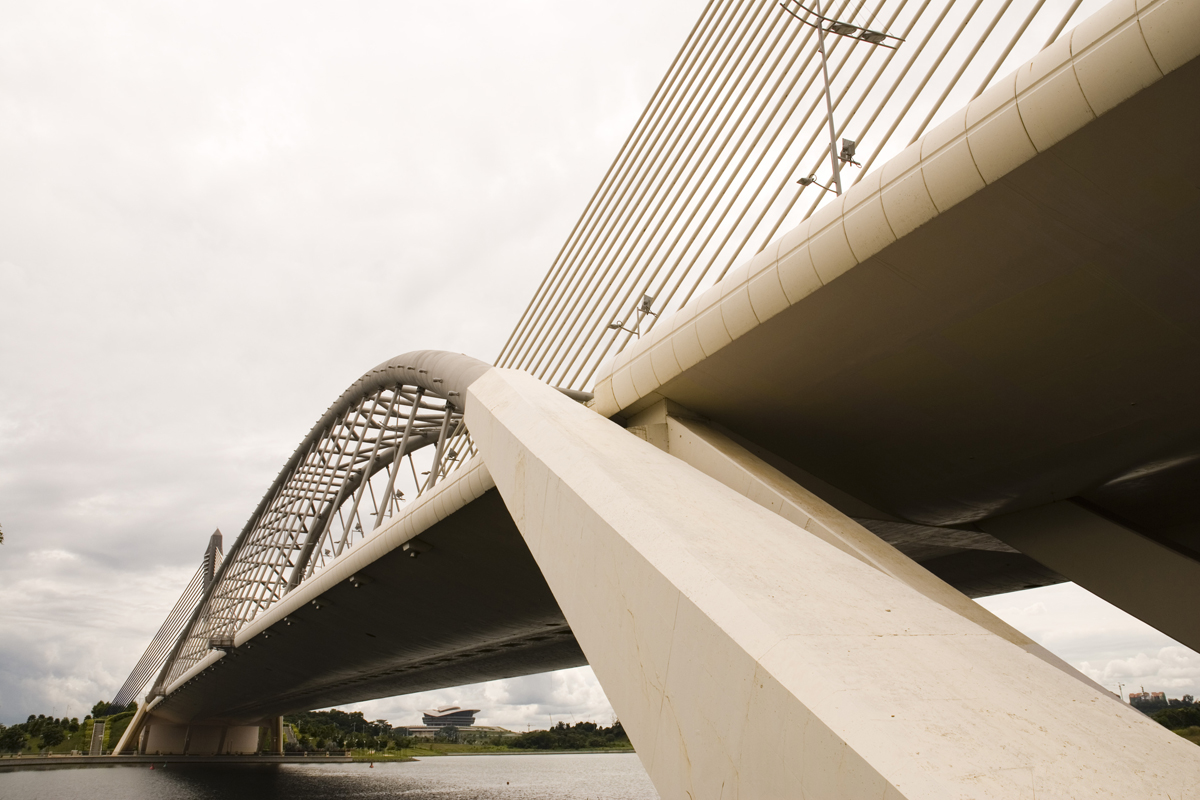
Seri Saujana Bridge

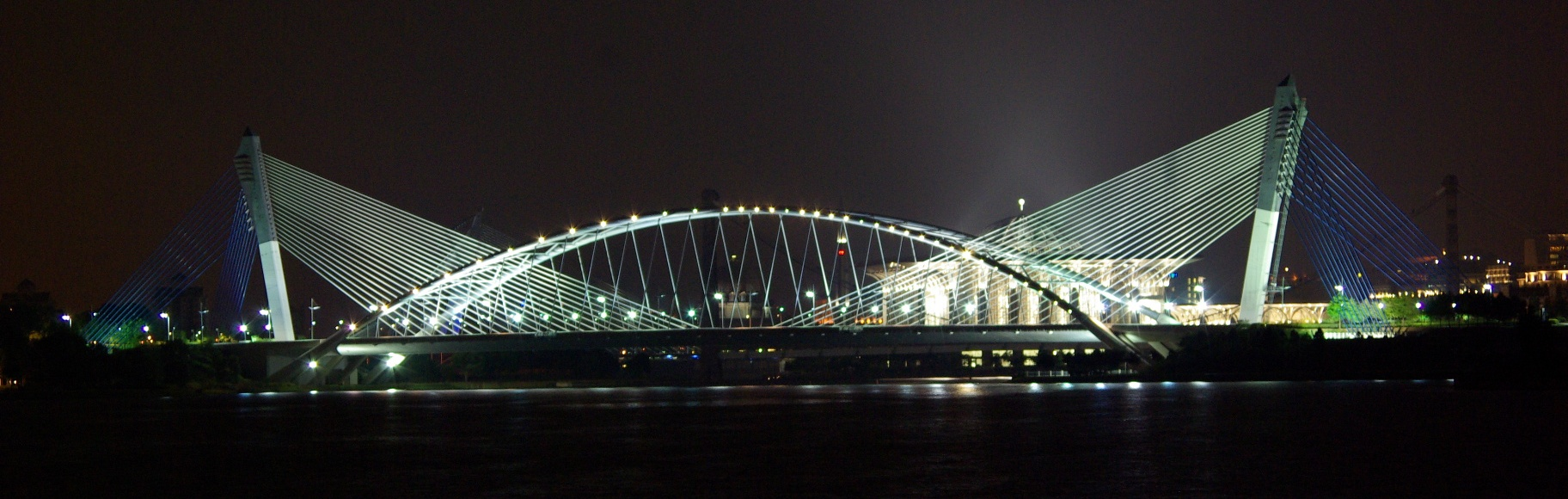
Seri Saujana Bridge by night

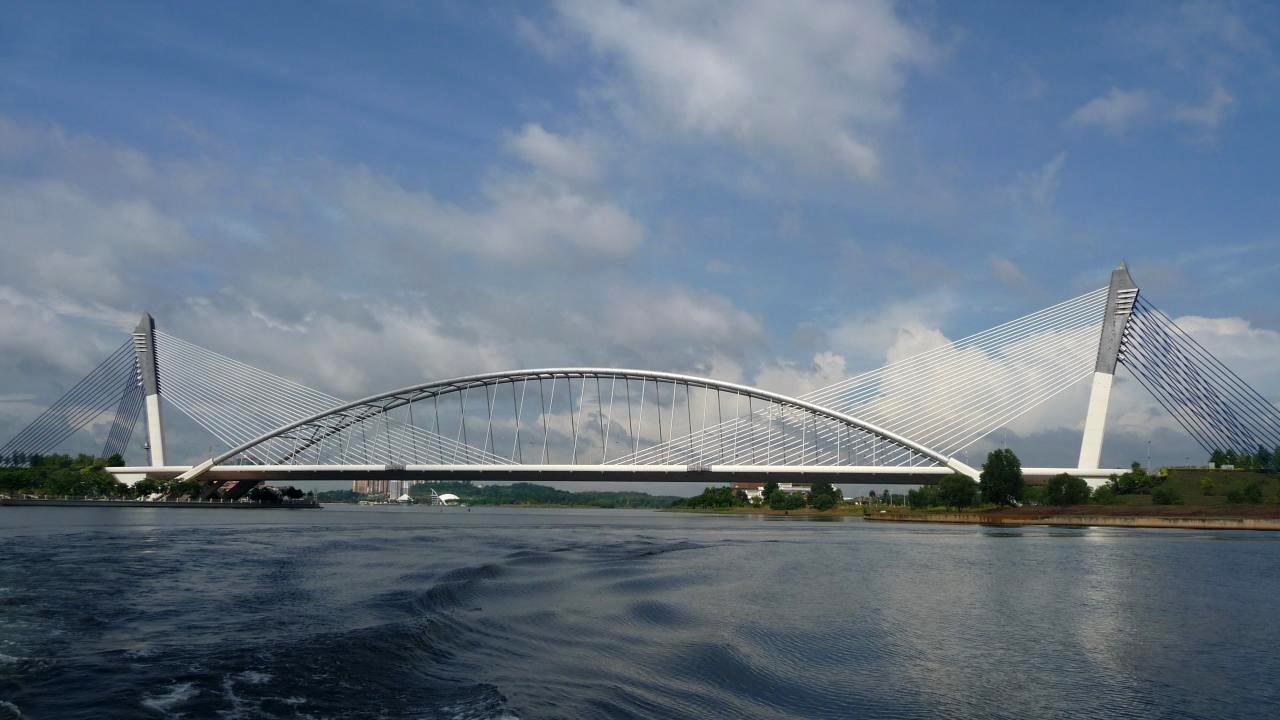
Seri Saujana Bridge 2009

== See also ==
Other bridges providing access to the Core Island in the planned city Putrajaya, Malaysia

- Seri Wawasan Bridge
- Seri Perdana Bridge
- Seri Setia Bridge
- Seri Gemilang Bridge
- Seri Bakti Bridge
- Seri Bestari Bridge
