= Persiaran Utara, Putrajaya =

Major highway in Malaysia

Persiaran Utara

Route information
- Existed: 1997–present
- History: Completed in 1999

Major junctions
- West end: Putrajaya interchange FT 29 Putrajaya–Cyberjaya Expressway
- FT 29 Putrajaya–Cyberjaya Expressway; Lebuh Sentosa; Persiaran Persekutuan; Persiaran Timur; South Klang Valley Expressway
- East end: Putra Interchange; South Klang Valley Expressway

Location
- Country: Malaysia
- Primary destinations: Putrajaya

Highway system
- Highways in Malaysia; Expressways; Federal; State

Persiaran Utara is a major highway in Putrajaya, Malaysia. It connects Putrajaya-Cyberjaya Expressway interchange in the west to Putra Interchange of the South Klang Valley Expressway in the north.

== Junction lists ==
Legend:

- I/C - Interchange, I/S - Intersection, RSA - Rest and service area, OBR - Overhead bridge restaurant, R/R - Restaurant and rest plaza, L/B - Layby, V/P - Vista point, TN - tunnel, T/P - Toll plaza, BR - Bridge
- C - Cloverleaf, S - Stack, T-A - Trumpet-A, T-B - Trumpet-B, DT - Directional-T/Y, SDT - Semi-Directional-T/Y, P-Y - Partial-Y, D - Diamond, P-C - Partial cloverleaf, D-D - Diverging diamond, D-R - Direct ramp

State/territory	District	Location	km	mi	Exit	Name	Destinations	Notes
Selangor	Sepang	Cyberjaya				Putrajaya-Cyberjaya Expressway	FT 29 Putrajaya–Cyberjaya Expressway – Cyberjaya, Puchong, Shah Alam, Petaling Jaya, Dengkil, Kuala Lumpur International Airport (KLIA), Johor Bahru	Trumpet interchange
Putrajaya	N/A	Seri Perdana				Lebuh Sentosa I/C	Lebuh Sentosa – Presint 11, Presint—until --, Seri Perdana, Government office, Perdana Putra Building, Putra Mosque	Half cloverleaf interchange
Putrajaya	N/A	Seri Perdana				Seri Perdana	Seri Perdana	Trumpet interchange
Putrajaya	N/A	Wetlands			Wetlands Bridge			
Putrajaya	N/A	Wetlands				Wetlands I/C	Persiaran Persekutuan – Presint—until --, Alamanda, Putrajaya, Government office, Putrajaya Landmark, Perdana Putra Building, Putra Mosque	Interchange; South Only
Putrajaya	N/A	Wetlands				Persiaran Timur I/C	Persiaran Timur – Presint—until --, Alamanda, Putrajaya, Taman Pinggiran Putra, Dengkil, Bangi	Trumpet interchange
Selangor	Sepang	Serdang				IRC I/C	IRC Highway	Interchange
Selangor	Sepang	Serdang			2602	Putra-SKVE I/C	South Klang Valley Expressway – Pulau Indah, Banting, Klang, Cyberjaya, Ipoh, Kuala Lumpur International Airport (KLIA), Puchong, Shah Alam, Kajang, Semenyih, Kuala Lumpur, Seremban	Trumpet interchange
1.000 mi = 1.609 km; 1.000 km = 0.621 mi: Incomplete access
