= Islamic Complex Putrajaya =

Kompleks Islam Putrajaya
- Interactive map of the Kompleks Islam Putrajaya area

General information
- Location: Putrajaya, Malaysia
- Coordinates: 2°55′1.68″N 101°40′55.88″E
- Construction started: October 2011
- Completed: July 2016

Technical details
- Structural system: Islamic

Design and construction
- Architect: TH Properties

The Islamic Complex Putrajaya (Malay: Kompleks Islam Putrajaya) is an administrative building complex for Malaysian government agencies located in the federal administrative center, Federal Territory of Putrajaya. Putrajaya Islamic Complex is located in Precinct 3, Putrajaya next to Tuanku Mizan Zainal Abidin Mosque and is motivated by modern Islamic architecture.

== History ==
Putrajaya Islamic Complex was first built in October 2011 in Precinct 3, Putrajaya. The construction was completed in July 2016 and commenced operations on 1 December 2016. The office block named as Putrajaya Islamic Complex was built by TH Properties on a 2.21-hectare (5.5-acre) site. The Putrajaya Islamic Complex, which is motivated by modern Islamic architecture, consists of four blocks, namely Blocks A, B, C and D. This complex houses nine religious agencies under the portfolio of Religious Affairs, Prime Minister's Department including JAKIM as his main headquarters. Blocks A, C and D are connected by a bridge that is on the second floor in each block. The building also has an underground auditorium and can accommodate about 773 people.

== Inauguration ==
The Putrajaya Islamic Complex was inaugurated on 18 July 2017 by the Prime Minister of Malaysia, Najib Razak. Putrajaya Islamic Complex features Islamic architecture that has its own aesthetic value, progressive and the latest technology. The arch on the roof shows the beauty of geometry featuring curves shaped like "roof weaving" (tenunan bumbung).

== Function ==
With the centralization of religious agencies in this complex, matters of Islamic affairs such as halal certificate applications, hajj and umrah matters, Islamic financial and banking services and Islamic family matters can be provided to customers more easily and quickly.

== Architecture ==
The unique facade of the Putrajaya Islamic Complex building is motivated “Islamic trellis” forming lace braiding provides natural lighting and reduces glare. This building has the concept of light, transparency and dynamics. Inspired by the parable of "nur" which is light as stated in Surah An-Nur verse 35. The main canopy with a design like a semi-structured steel dome, subtly gives an interpretation of the decorative Islamic ornaments of muqarnas (three-dimensional decoration). The KIP building concept was built with the aim of realizing a wider and more comfortable working environment. In the main entrance hall there is a covered or covered area for the convenience of users to enter and exit. The main lobby or public area is designed with a height (double volume height) to look wider and allow adequate lighting and airflow. Access facilities for the disabled are provided in each strategic area.
