= Department of Islamic Development Malaysia =

Malaysia religious government agency

- Jabatan Kemajuan Islam Malaysia جابتن كماجوان اسلام مليسيا

Agency overview
- Formed: 1 January 1997; 29 years ago
- Headquarters: Blok A dan B, Kompleks Islam Putrajaya, No 23, Jalan Tunku Abdul Rahman, Presint 3, 62100 Putrajaya
- Annual budget: MYR 1.5 billion (2023)
- Minister responsible: Zulkifli Hasan, Minister in the Prime Minister's Department for Religious Affairs
- Agency executive: Dato' Dr. Sirajuddin Suhaimee, Director General
- Parent agency: Prime Minister's Department
- Website: www.islam.gov.my

The Department of Islamic Development Malaysia (Malay: Jabatan Kemajuan Islam Malaysia, Jawi: جابتن كماجوان اسلام مليسيا), or popularly known as JAKIM (جاكيم), is a federal government agency in Malaysia that administers Islamic affairs in Malaysia.

== History ==
In 1969, Malaysia's Conference of Rulers decided that there was a need for a body to mobilise the development and progress of Muslims in Malaysia, in line with the status of Malaysia as a growing Muslim-majority country and gaining international attention.

Realising this fact, a secretariat to the National Council of Islamic Religious Affairs Malaysia (MKI) was established, to preserve the purity of Islamic beliefs and teachings. The secretariat was later developed as the Religious Division, the Prime Minister's Department which was then re-promoted to the Islamic Affairs Division (Malay: Bahagian Hal Ehwal Islam) (BAHEIS).

On 1 January 1997, in line with the growing development and progress of Islam in the country, the Department of Islamic Development Malaysia (JAKIM) was established by the Malaysian government as taking over power and role of BAHEIS.

On 1 October 2003, a new halal certification logo is introduced.

== Functions ==
The Department of Islamic Development Malaysia, the Prime Minister's Department plays a central role in the planning of Islamic Affairs management and development of the Ummah with the following functions:

- Responsible as a planner who determines the development and progress of Islamic Affairs in Malaysia;
- Formulate a policy for the development of Islamic Affairs in the country and maintain the purity of Islamic beliefs and teachings
- Assist in formulating and harmonising the necessary laws and regulations as well as evaluating and coordinating the implementation of existing laws and administration in the efforts to resolve problems of Muslims;
- Implement ummah development programs and appreciation of Islam in the management of the country;
- Coordinate legal enforcement mechanisms as well as regulatory affairs of Islamic Affairs nationwide;
- Evaluate Islamic Affairs programs implemented in the country;
- Acting as a collector, disseminator and reference center of information on Islamic affairs; and
- Implement community development efforts through regional and international cooperation.

== Organisation structure ==
The department consists of three main sectors, namely Policy Sector, Operations Sector and Management Sector.

The Policy Sector is divided into six Divisions:

- Islamic Development Policy division
- Research division
- Coordination of Shariah Enforcement and Prosecution division
- External Affairs and Relationships division
- Halal Management division
- Maqasid Syariah division

The Operations Sector is divided into five divisions:

- Dawah division
- Family, Social and Community division
- Publications division
- Broadcasting division - Known as the Radio and Television Dawah Units of state broadcaster Radio Televisyen Malaysia (RTM) before their transfer to the Islamic Affairs division of the Prime Minister Department on 1 June 1994. It is responsible for producing religious programmings for RTM's radio and television channels. Its radio channel – Salam FM was established on 15 February 2009 and broadcast from Wisma Radio in Angkasapuri, Kuala Lumpur from 11:00pm to 8:00am, sharing the same frequency as Asyik FM.
- Education division

The Management Sector is divided into four divisions:

- Human Resource Management division
- Financial division
- Information Management division
- Management Services division

The following organisations are placed directly under the Director General of Jakim:

- Islamic Training Institute of Malaysia (Malay Institut Latihan Islam Malaysia) (ILIM)
- Legal Division
- Secretary of the Malaysian Halal Council
- Darul Quran
- Sarawak Islamic Skills Institute (Malay:Institut Kemahiran Islam Malaysia Sarawak) (IKMAS)
- Sabah Institute of Islamic Studies and Dawah (Malay:Institut Pengajian Islam dan Dakwah Sabah) (IPDAS)
- JAKIM (Sabah branch)
- JAKIM (Sarawak branch)
- Corporate Communication unit
- Integrity Unit
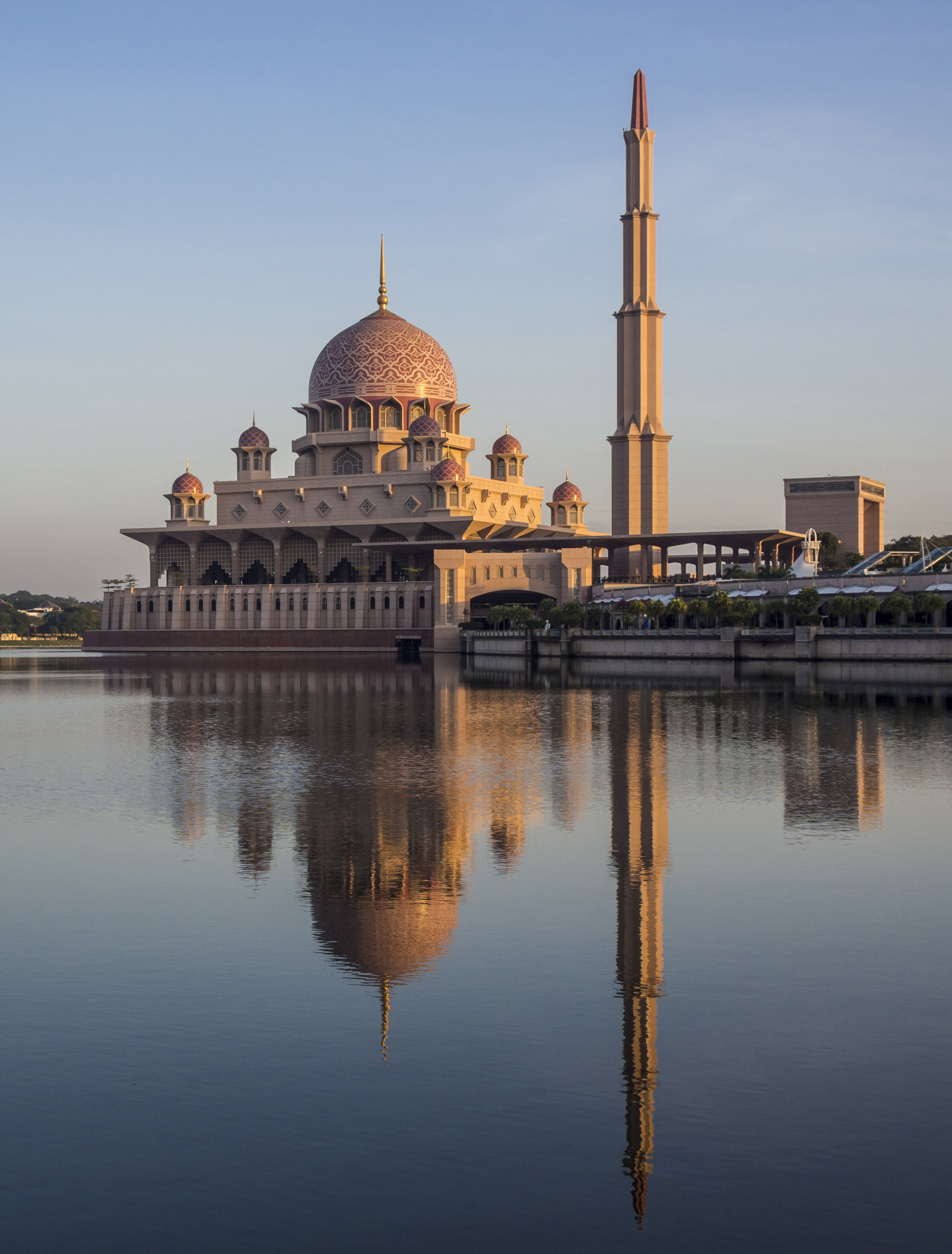
  Putra Mosque in Putrajaya.

The three main mosques are placed under the JAKIM Preaching Division:

- Masjid Negara
- Masjid Putra
- Masjid Tuanku Mizan Zainal Abidin

== List of Directors-General ==
Since formation of JAKIM, 10 peoples was appointed in this position with currently lead by Sirajuddin Suhaimee.

Name	Years in office
Abdul Hamid Zainal Abidin	1995 - 2001
Mohamad Shahir Abdullah	2001 - 2003
Mustafa Abdul Rahman	2004 - 2006
Wan Mohamad Sheikh Abdul Aziz	2006 - 2012
Othman Mustapha	2012 - 2018
Mohamad Nordin Ibrahim	2018 - 2019
Paimuzi Yahya	2020
Abdul Aziz Jusoh	2021 - 2022
Hakimah Mohd Yusoff	2022 - 2024
Sirajuddin Suhaimee	2024 - Incumbent

== Legalisation ==
The formation of JAKIM faced criticism from many groups claiming its establishment violated the constitution of Malaysia. G25, a group of representing of former civil servant said the established of JAKIM was not aligned with constitution as power of the Conference of Rulers does not include the formation of JAKIM cited of Article 38 of the constitution. However, former Prime Minister, Mahathir Mohamad defended the formation of JAKIM by citing it was aimed at bringing the government in line with Islamic teachings. His statement was supported by Mujahid Yusof Rawa, former Minister in the Prime Minister's Department (Religious Affairs) quoted it was set up to cater to the current needs, including when it comes to managing the budget for the administration of Islamic matters.

== See also ==
- Islam in Malaysia
- Institute of Islamic Understanding Malaysia
