= Road Builder Holdings =

Road Builder (M) Holdings Bhd
- Company type: Private Limited Company
- Industry: Construction; Properties; Toll roads Port operator
- Founded: 27 March 1992
- Headquarters: Damansara Heights, Kuala Lumpur, Malaysia
- Parent: IJM Corporation

Road Builder (M) Holdings Bhd. is a holding company based in Kuala Lumpur, Malaysia. As of 2007, Road Builder Holdings is 100% owned by IJM Corporation Berhad.

== Subsidiaries ==
1. Besraya (M) Sdn Bhd (60%)
2. Essmarine Terminal Sdn Bhd (100%)
3. Gagah Garuda Sdn Bhd (100%)
4. HMS Resource Sdn Bhd (100%)
5. Kuantan Port Consortium Sdn Bhd (30%)
6. New Pantai Expressway Sdn Bhd (100%)
7. NPE Property Development Sdn Bhd (100%)
8. West Coast Expressway Sdn Bhd (20%)
