= Tuanku Mizan Zainal Abidin Mosque =

Mosque in Putrajaya, Malaysia

- Masjid Tuanku Mizan Zainal Abidin مسجد توانكو ميزان زين العابدين
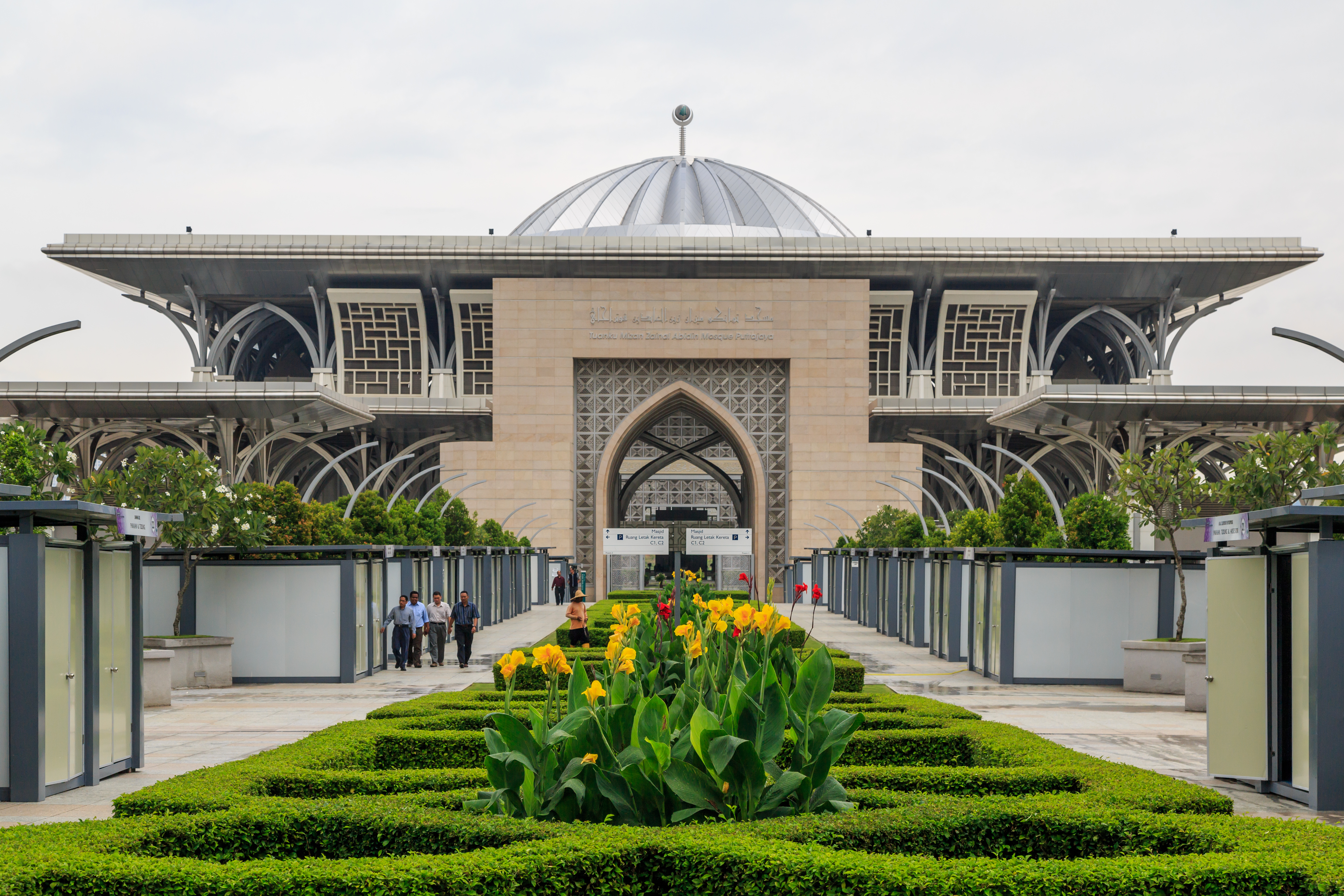

- Location within Peninsular Malaysia

Location
- Location: Putrajaya, Malaysia
- Interactive map of Tuanku Mizan Zainal Abidin Mosque
- Coordinates: 2°55′9.5″N 101°40′51.3″E

Architecture
- Architect: Nik Arshad Nik Mohammed
- Type: Mosque
- Style: Modern
- Completed: 2009
- Construction cost: RM 208 million (~ US$ 55 million)
- Capacity: 20,000 worshippers

The Tuanku Mizan Zainal Abidin Mosque (Malay: Masjid Tuanku Mizan Zainal Abidin; Jawi: مسجد توانكو ميزان زين العابدين) or the Iron Mosque (Malay: Masjid Besi) is the second principal mosque in Putrajaya, Malaysia after Putra Mosque. It is located in Putrajaya's Precinct 3, opposite the Palace of Justice and next to Islamic Complex Putrajaya, a religious authority headquarters. Construction began since April 2004 and was fully completed in August 2009. It was officially opened by the 13th Yang di-Pertuan Agong, Tuanku Mizan Zainal Abidin on 11 June 2010.

The mosque was built to cater to approximately 24,000 residents including the government servants working around the city center as well as areas within Precincts 2, 3, 4 and 18. Tuanku Mizan Zainal Abidin Mosque's area is twice that of Putra Mosque, which is located 2.2 kilometres north.

== Features ==
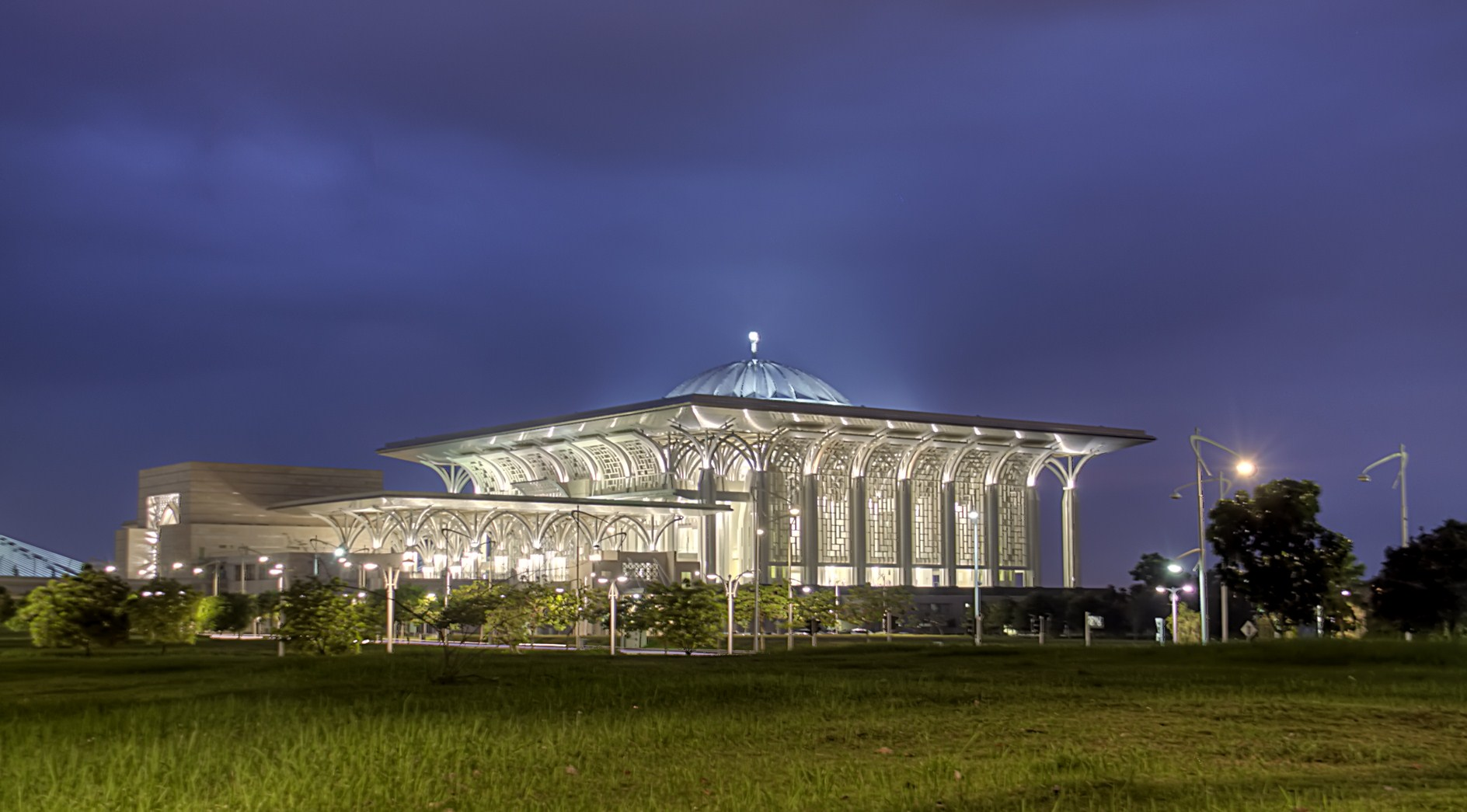
"Iron Mosque" at night.

The "Iron Mosque" features a district cooling system, and fans or an air conditioning system. The mosque employs "architectural wire mesh" imported from Germany and China, which is also constructed at the Santiago Bernabéu Stadium in Madrid and the Bibliothèque nationale de France in Paris. The main entrance is strengthened with glass reinforced concrete to increase the integrity of the structure and uses fine glass to create an illusion of a white mosque from afar.

The path towards the mosque crosses a skyway known as the Kiblat Walk which stretches an area of 13,639 m^{2}. This skyway contains landscaping adapted from the ancient castles of Alhambra. The interior is decorated with Al-Asmaul-Husna calligraphy of the Thuluth variation. The entrance to the main prayer hall is adorned with verse 80 of Sura Al-Isra from the Qur'an.

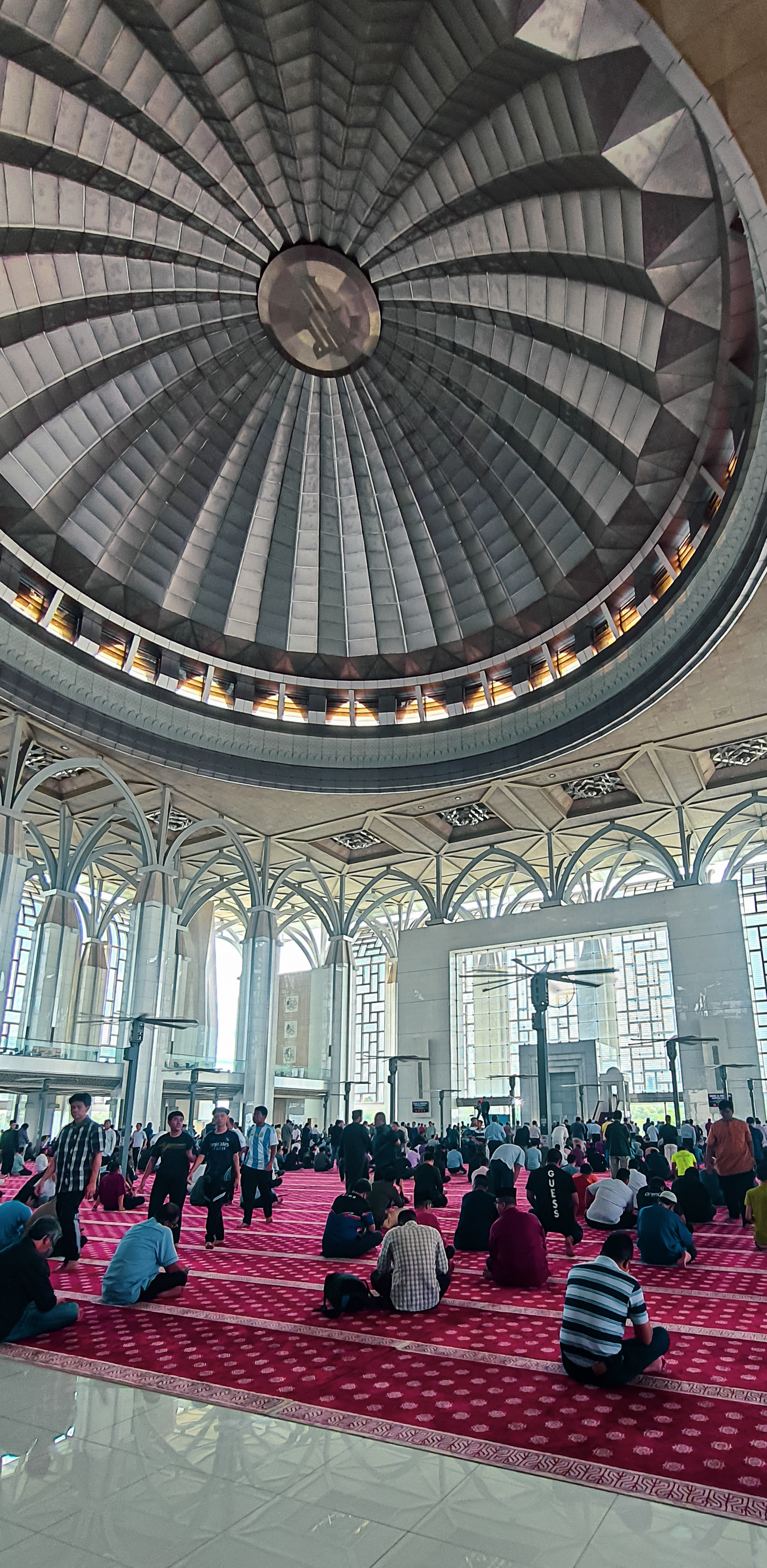
The interior of the main prayer hall of the Tuanku Mizan Zainal Abidin Mosque in Putrajaya.

There is a mihrab wall made of 13-meter-high glass panel imported from Germany inscribed with two verses from Surah Al-Baqarah on the right and Surah Ibrahim on the left. The mihrab wall is designed so that no light will be reflected, creating an illusion that the verses are floating on air. The 40-feet-long edges of the mosque's roof are able to shelter the people praying outside of the main prayer hall from rain.

== See also ==
- Islam in Malaysia
