= Putra Bridge =

Bridge in Putrajaya, Malaysia

Putra Bridge Jambatan Putra
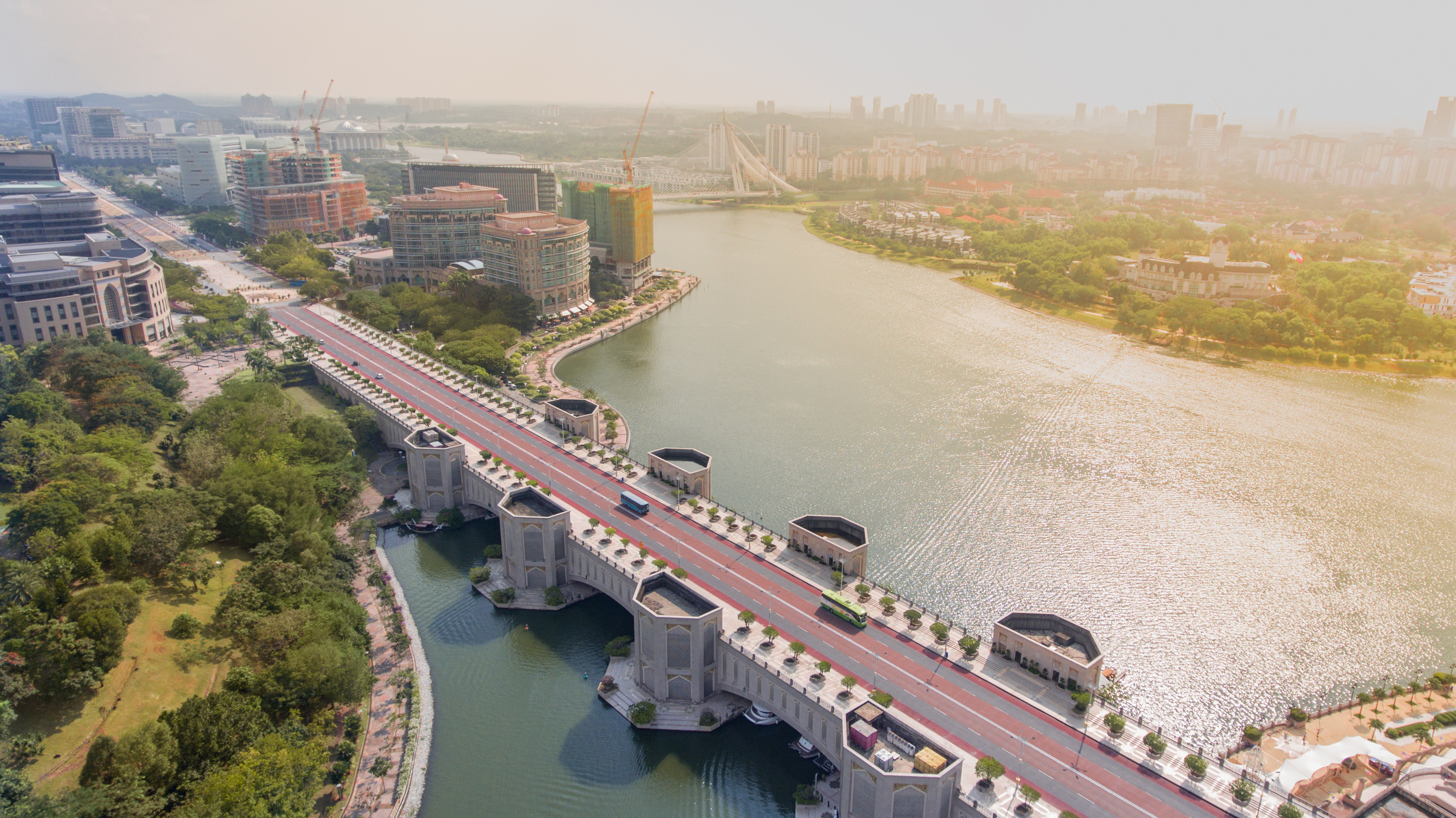
- Coordinates: 2.932583°N 101.690242°E
- Carries: Motor vehicles, Pedestrians
- Crosses: Putrajaya Lake
- Locale: Persiaran Perdana, Putrajaya
- Official name: Putra Bridge
- Maintained by: Perbadanan Putrajaya

Characteristics
- Design: arch bridge
- Total length: 435 m
- Longest span: 435 m

History
- Designer: Perbadanan Putrajaya
- Constructed by: Perbadanan Putrajaya
- Opened: 1999

Location
- Interactive map of Putra Bridge

Putra Bridge (Malay: Jambatan Putra) is the main bridge in Putrajaya, Malaysia. It is analogous to Khaju Bridge in Esfahan, Iran. With a span of 435 metres, this bridge connects the Government Precinct to the Mixed Development Precinct and links Putra Square with the Boulevard. It was constructed in 1997.

The upper level of the bridge forms part of the Boulevard. This huge triple-deck bridge provides vehicle, monorail and pedestrian access. Besides providing the link between Precinct 1 and Precinct 2 on the Core Island, it has been designed to be a special feature of Putrajaya. The piers also accommodate fine dining restaurants within its main pillar supports.
