= Putra Square =

Square in Putrajaya, Malaysia

Coordinates: 2.9352835°N 101.6889327°E

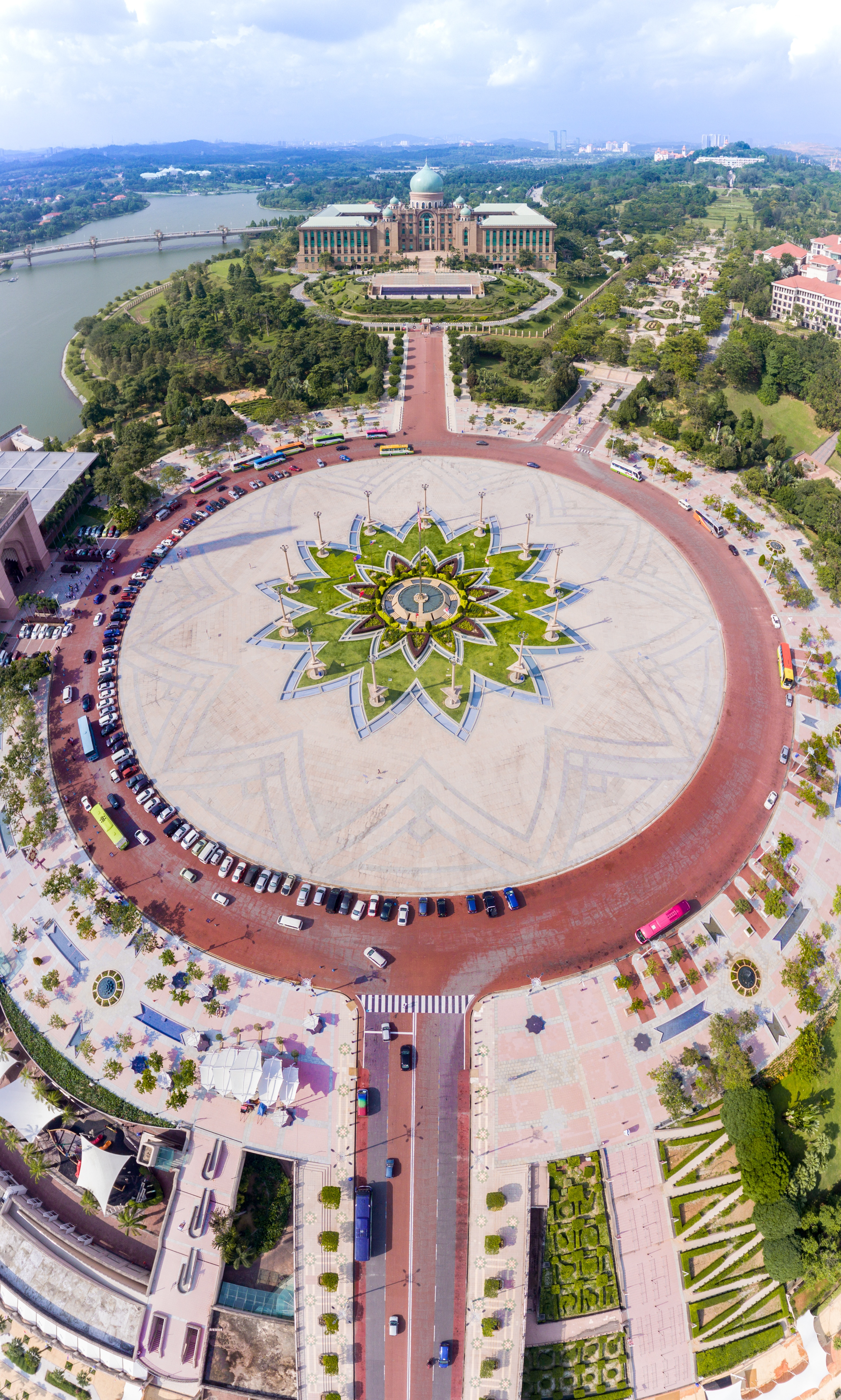
Putra Square

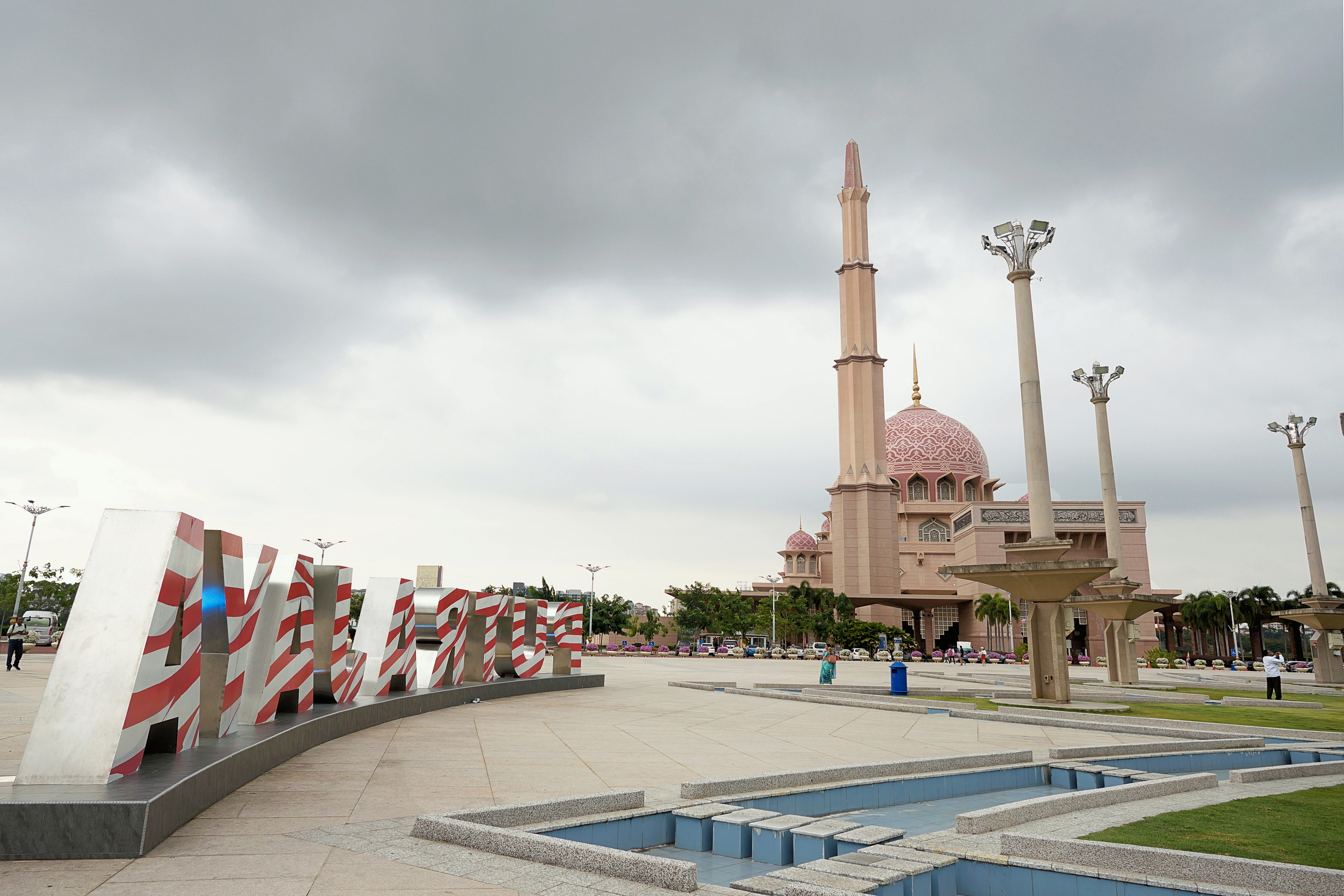
View of the 'Putrajaya' sign (from rear) and Putra Mosque.

The Putra Square (Malay: Dataran Putra) is a city square in Presint 1, Putrajaya, Malaysia. The square has been used for festivals such as the Malaysian Independence Day parade. The 300 meter circular Putra Square is bounded by Perdana Putra, Putra Mosque, Putra Bridge and the Promenade Shopping Mall.

In a tall flagpole in the square is the National flag of Malaysia surrounded by flags of each of its States. Occasionally in events when foreign head of states' visits occur, the flags of each of its States are replaced with the national flags of Malaysia and the country of the head of state.

From the square, there are fine views of Perdana Putra, the Prime Minister's Office Building (to the north) and the Putra Mosque (to the east).

== Design ==
Designed as two concentric plazas surrounded by Putra Perdana Park, the circular ceremonial area is an open hard landscape encircled by Charbaghs, which acts as a transition between the parks and the ceremonial area. Inside the Charbagh is an interplay of paths, water channels, flower beds and trees.

The Square is divided into 11 segments, in the pattern of an 11-pointed star. The outer 11-pointed star represents the 11 states of Malaya when the country gained independence in August 1957, the inner 13-pointed star represents the 13 states of Malaysia and the 14-pointed star includes the new addition of the Federal Territory. The progressive arrangements of the different pointed stars finally culminate in a circle at the centre of the Square. The circle symbolises the ultimate goal of unity.

== Gallery ==
Photos at Putra Square/Dataran Putra :-

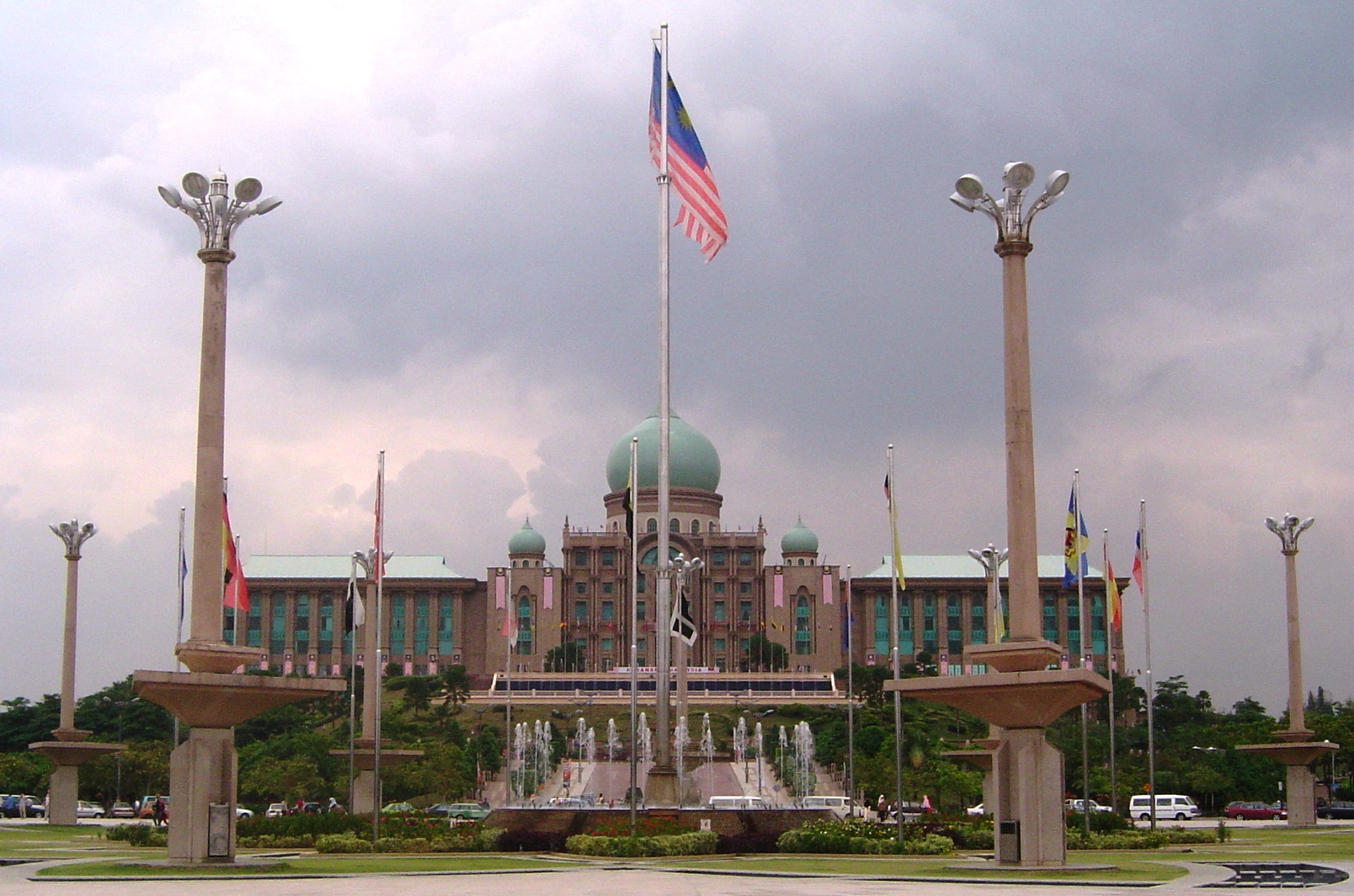
Prime Minister's office as seen from Putra Square.

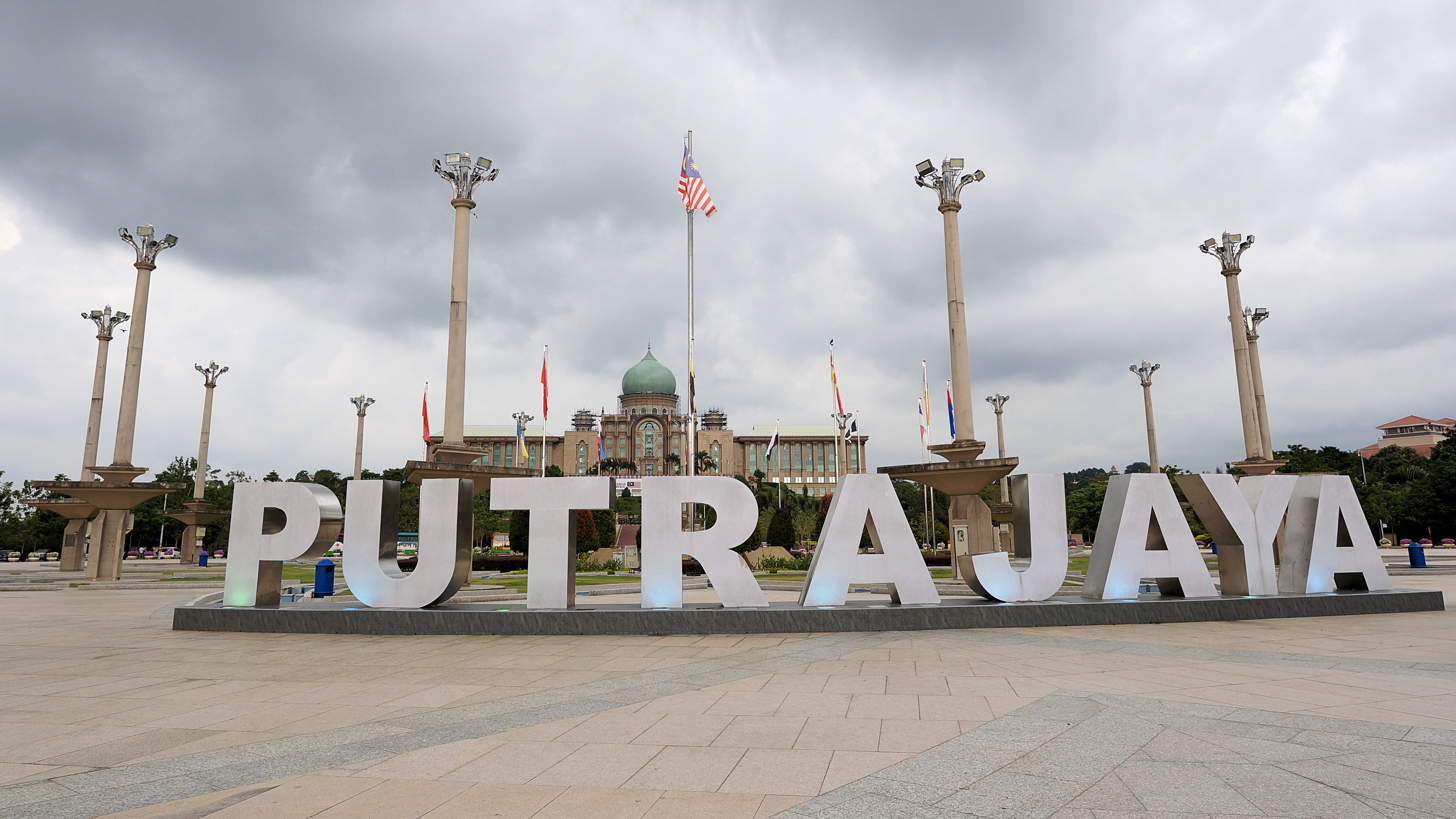
At Putra Square, the 'Putrajaya' sign is popular with visitors to the square.

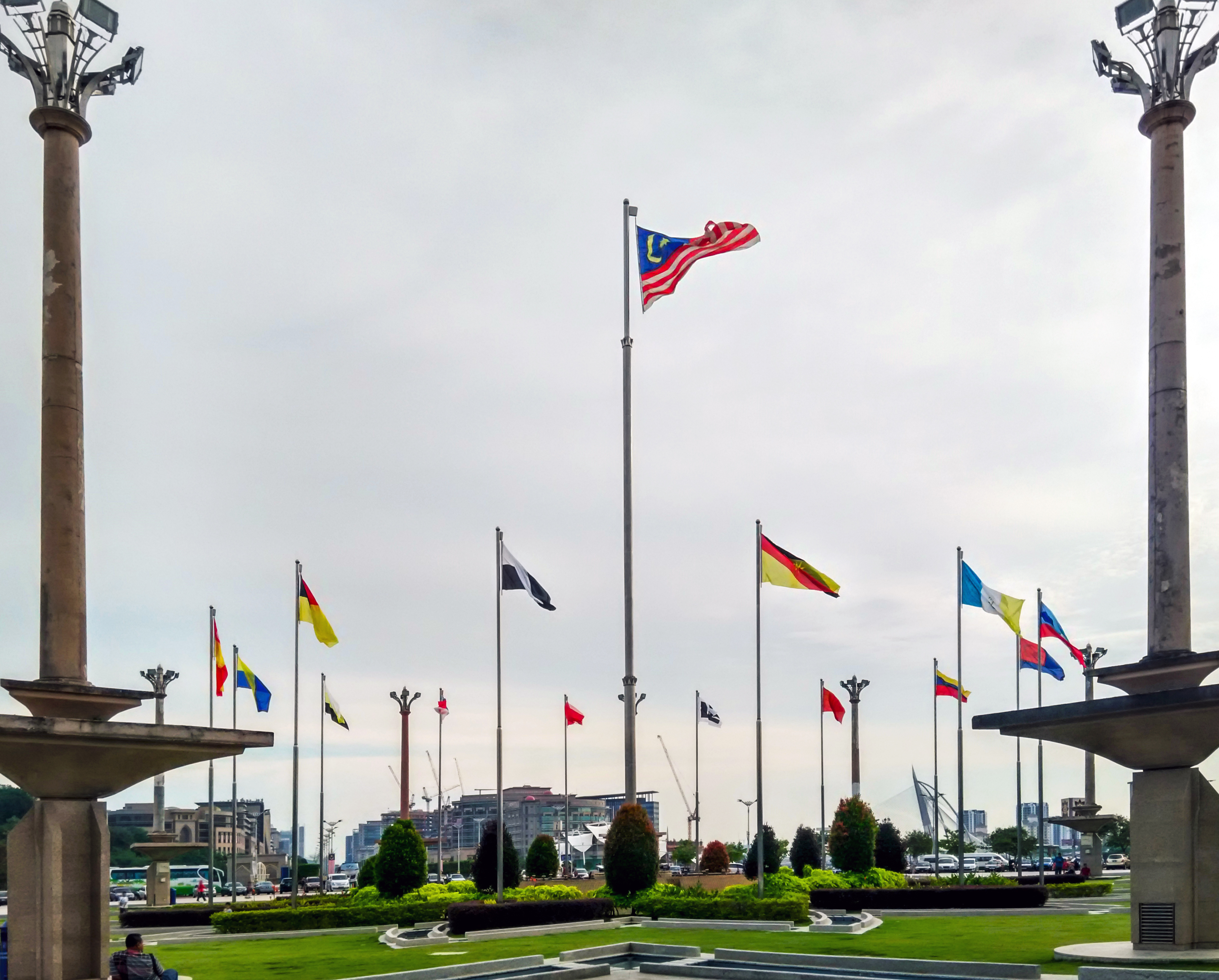
The National and State flags at Putra Square.

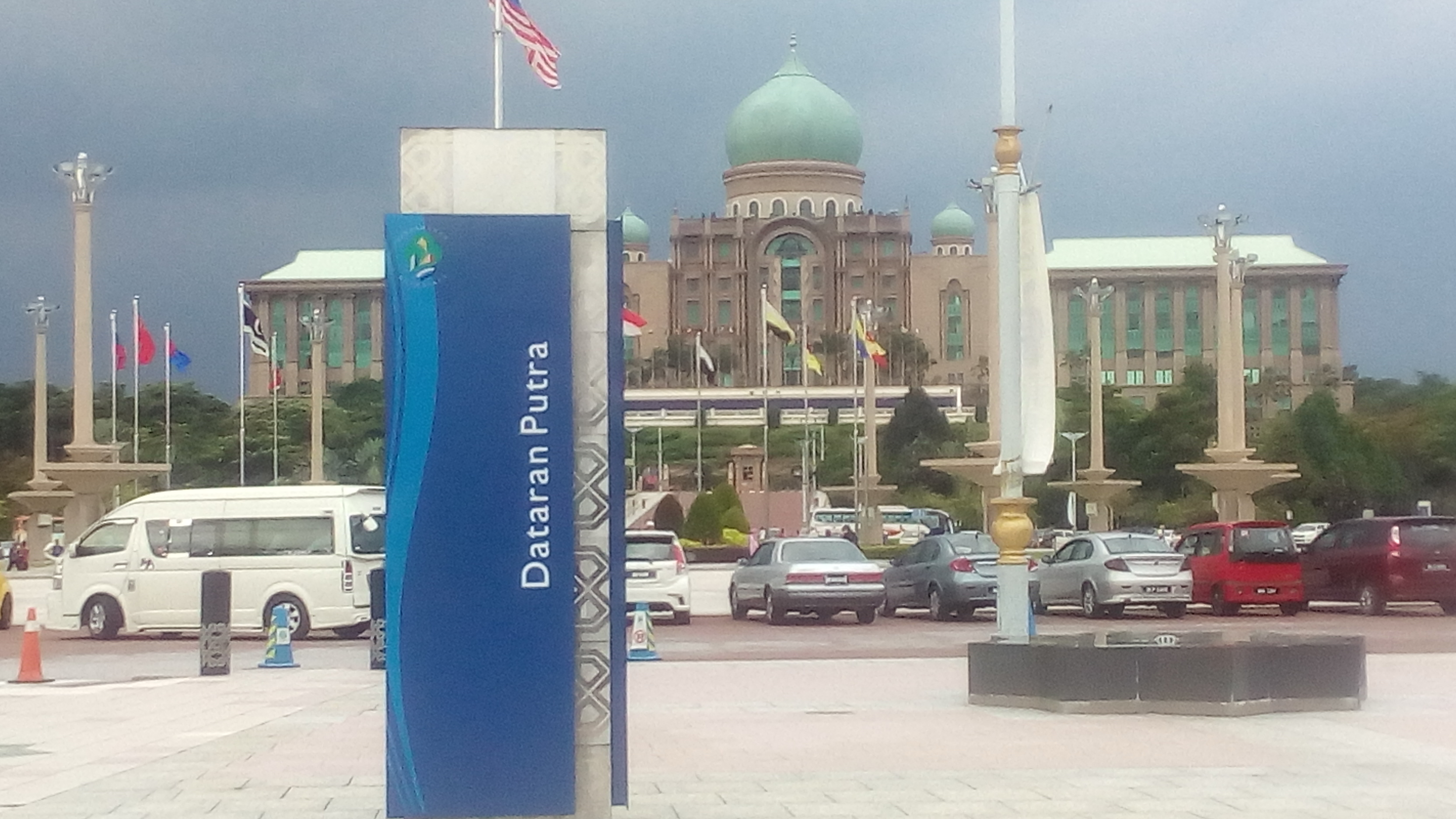
At Dataran Putra/Putra Square.

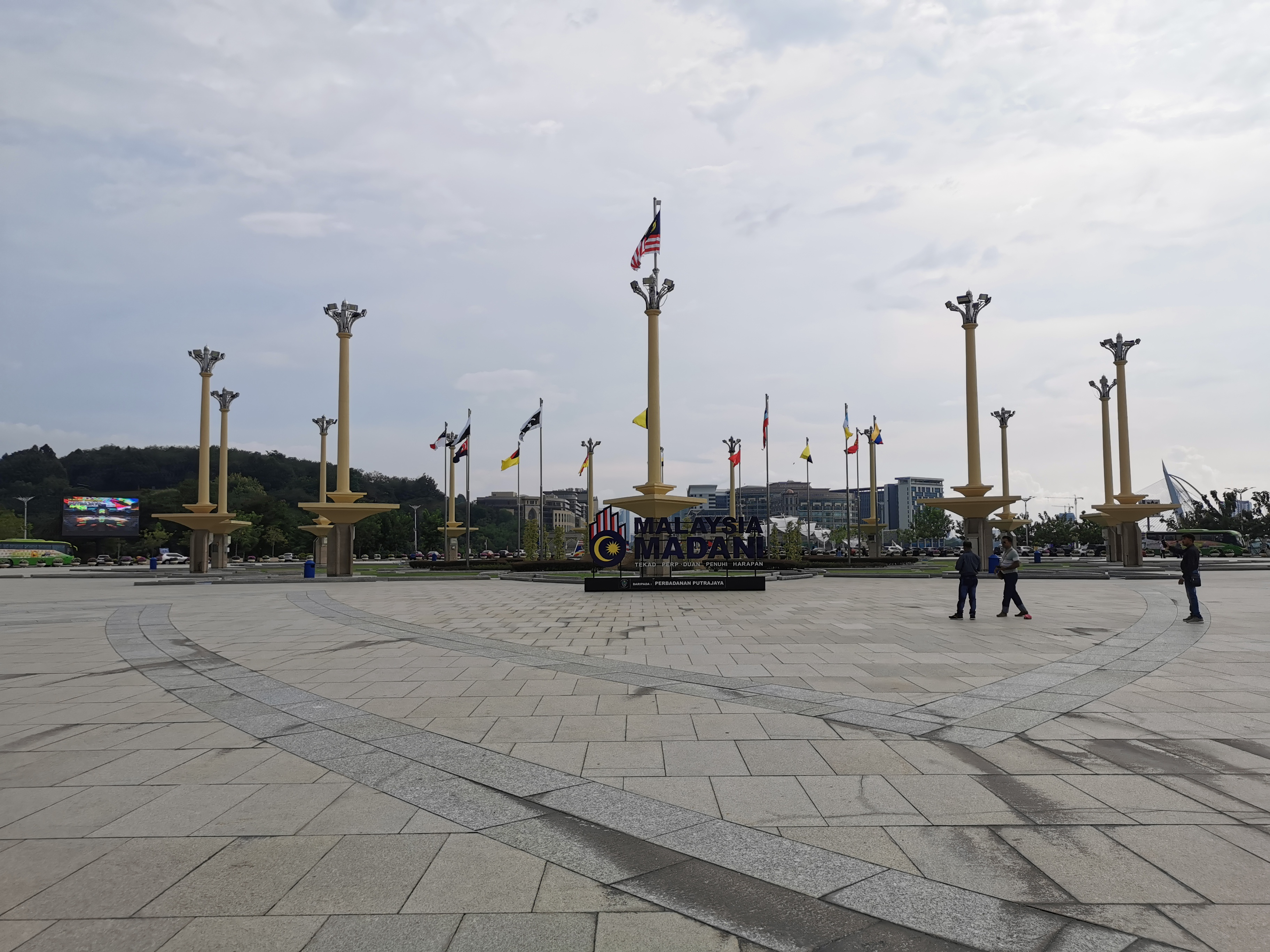
Putra Square in 2023 with the Malaysia Madani sign placed at the square.

== See also ==
- Dataran Merdeka, Kuala Lumpur
