= Taman Selatan =

Cemetery in Putrajaya, Malaysia

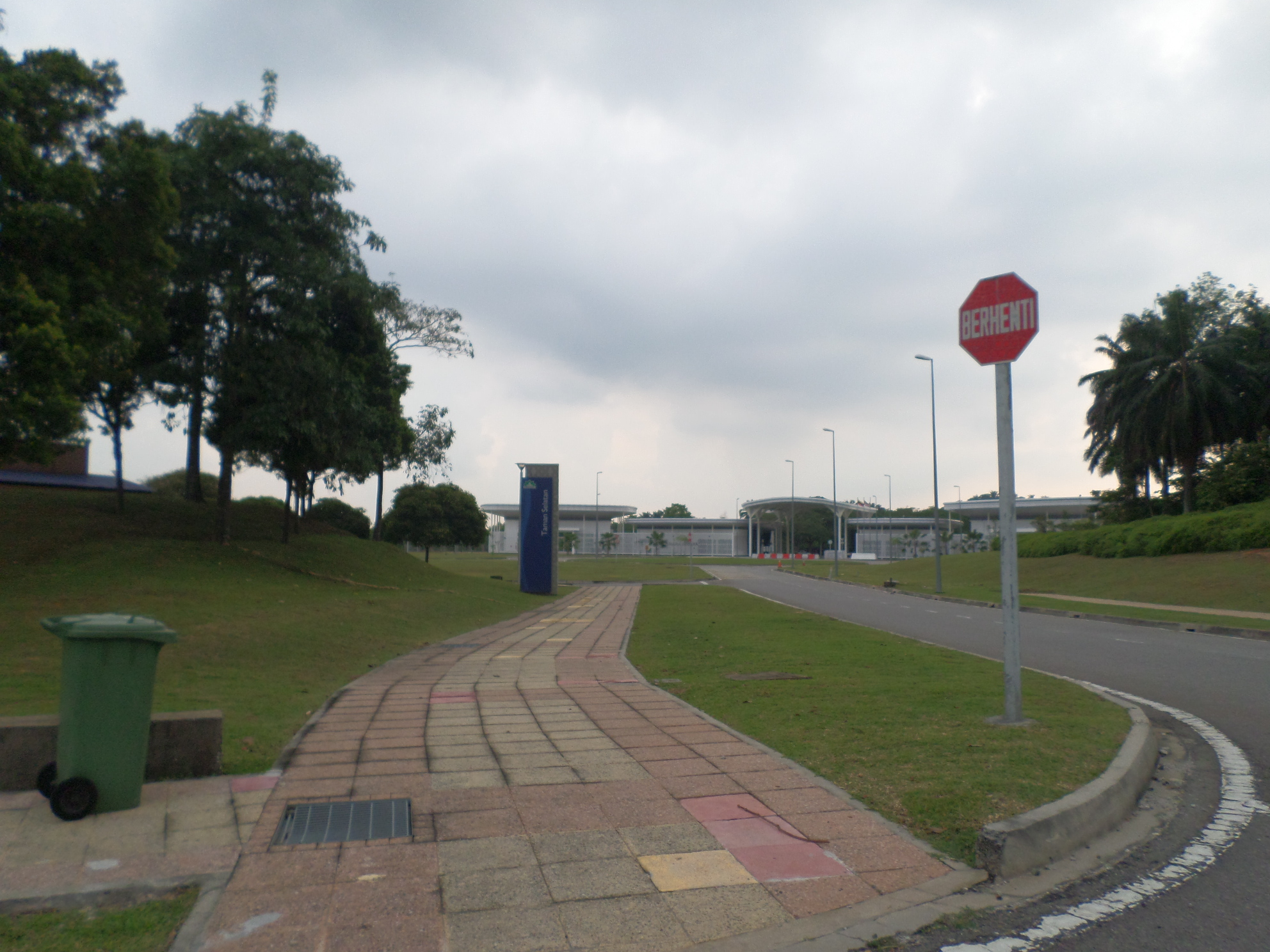
- Interactive map of Taman Selatan

Details
- Established: 2003
- Location: Precinct 20, Putrajaya
- Country: Malaysia
- Coordinates: 2°53′04″N 101°40′25″E
- Type: Public cemetery
- Owned by: Perbadanan Putrajaya
- Size: 192.38 hectares
- No. of graves: 570
- Website: Taman Selatan

Taman Selatan or Southern Park is a national cemetery in Precinct 20, Putrajaya, Malaysia.

== Facilities ==
Taman Selatan provides separate burial grounds for Muslims, Christians, Buddhists and Hindus. Other facilities include a Muslim prayer hall, crematorium, religious pavilions, staff housing, an administration building and a memorial centre containing a memorial wall and exhibition area.

=== Pusara Negara ===
Pusara Negara (National Cemetary) is a burial area within Taman Selatan dedicated for important national figures.

== Notable burials ==
- Azizan Zainul Abidin – corporate figure and President of Putrajaya Corporation and Petronas. (died 2004)
- Endon Mahmood – wife of former Prime Minister of Malaysia Abdullah Ahmad Badawi. (died 2005)
- Ahmad Hakimi Hanapi – Malaysia Airlines MH17 co-pilot who perished in the Malaysia Airlines Flight 17 crash on 17 July 2014. (died 2014)
- Nor Shazana Mohamed Salleh – Malaysia Airlines stewardess who perished in the Malaysia Airlines Flight 17 crash on 17 July 2014. (died 2014)
- Ali Hamsa – 13th Chief Secretary to the Government of Malaysia (died 2022)
- Abdul Hamid Mohamad − 5th Chief Justice of Malaysia (died 2026).
- Siti Hasmah − doctor and civil servant who served as the spouse of the prime minister of Malaysia from 1981 to 2003 and again from 2018 to 2020, as the wife of Mahathir Mohamad. (died 2026)
