= Putrajaya International Convention Centre =

Convention centre in Putrajaya, Malaysia

Coordinates: 02°53.7′N 101°40.6′E

- Pusat Konvensyen Antarabangsa Putrajaya
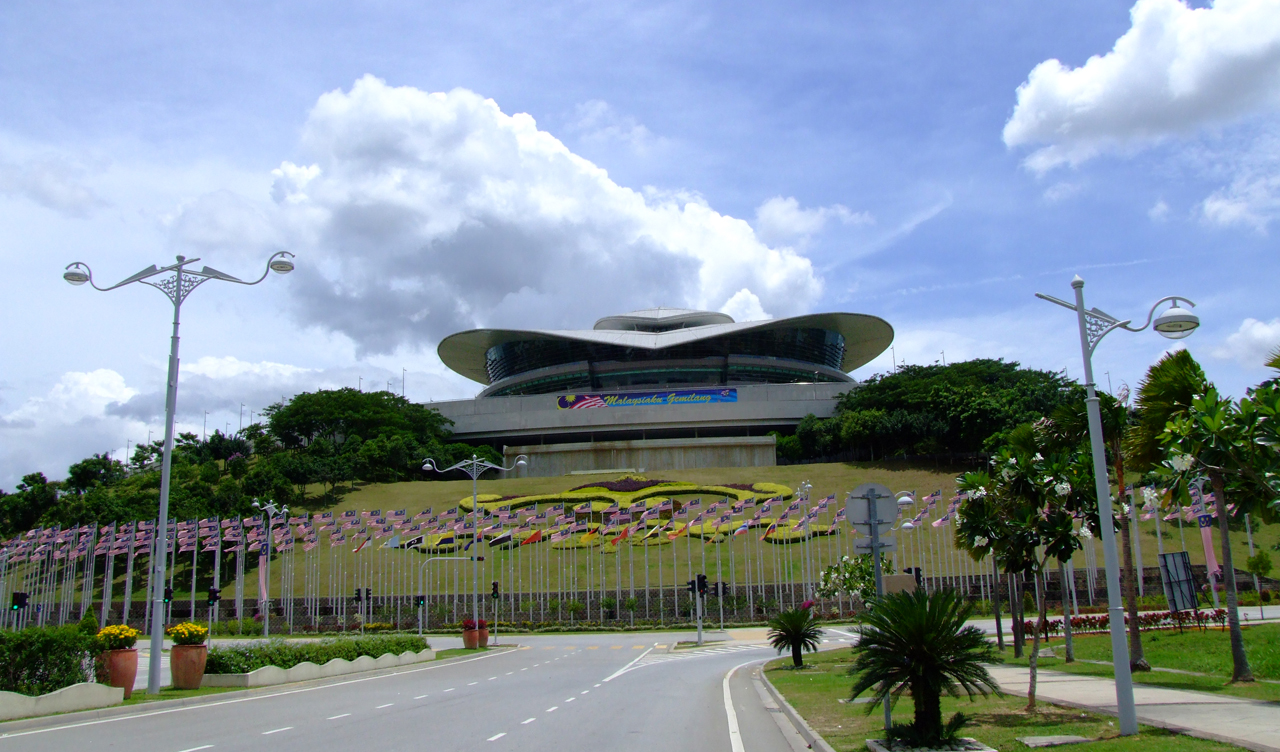
- Interactive map of the Putrajaya International Convention Centre area

General information
- Status: Completed
- Type: International Convention Centre
- Architectural style: Malay Contemporary architecture
- Location: Putrajaya, Malaysia
- Groundbreaking: 2001
- Construction started: 2001
- Completed: 2003
- Inaugurated: 2004

Website
- https://www.picc.com.my/

The Putrajaya International Convention Centre (PICC; Malay: Pusat Konvensyen Antarabangsa Putrajaya) is a convention centre in Putrajaya, Malaysia. It occupies an area of 135,000 square meters in Precinct 5. The building began construction in 2001 and was completed in September 2003. It is designed by fourth prime minister Mahathir Mohamad to look like the eye of pending perak (a silver Malay royal belt buckle). It was renamed from the Putrajaya Convention Centre in October 2004 to its present name to reflect its international status on par with conference centres in world-class cities such as London, Tokyo and Paris.

Notable events held at the PICC include: the 10th Islamic Summit organised by the Organisation of Islamic Cooperation (OIC) in October 2003, the Malaysian International Fireworks Competition in 2007 and 2008, the Enthiran original motion picture soundtrack release in 2010, and the 20th Gano Excel Internacional - Convención Global in 2015.

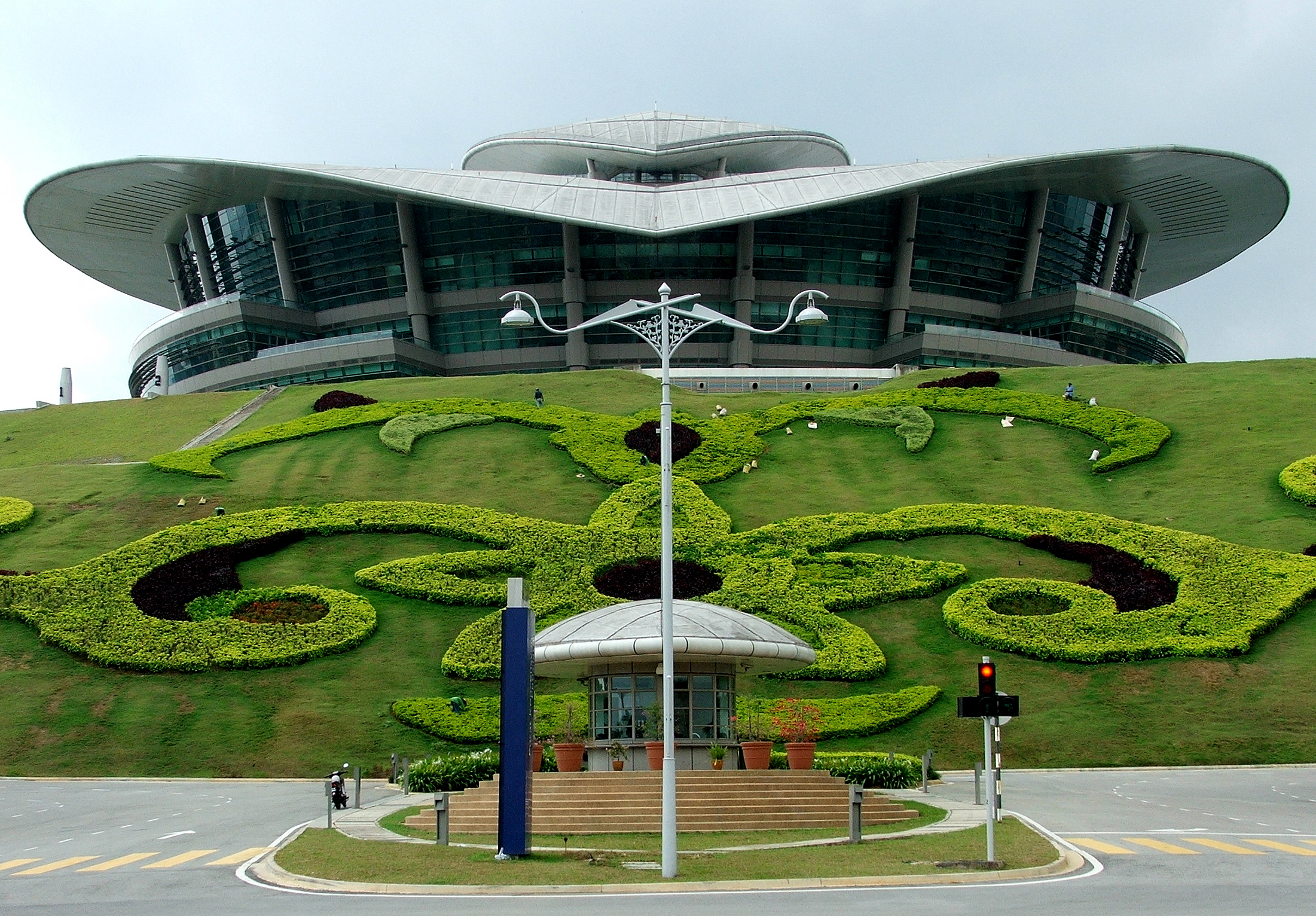
Close-up of the convention centre

== Interior ==
The interior of the PICC has 5 different halls, these include:

- The Plenary Hall, which is designed for major conferences and includes a podium stage, and allows a capacity of up to 3,000 people;
- The Heads of States Hall, which has a circular seating arrangement for 180 people;
- The Perdana Hall, which has an extensive kitchen able to serve 2,800 seated diners; and two unity halls that can each be divided for seminars, exhibitions or banquets of up to 2000 people.

All the halls are equipped with interpreter rooms that have 13 different languages available. Additionally, the PICC has 14 suites for bilateral meetings on various levels, VIP Lounges, 10 halls for conference discussions where each hall can accommodate 200 participants, four meeting rooms for 10 to 100 persons, three public galleries, a restaurant, two prayer rooms, over four kiosks, and a business centre for the delegates' convenience.

PICC has two major entrances. There is the Ground floor entrance, and the Mezzanine level entrance. The two-level car park in the basement can accommodate 1,200 vehicles, with lift access to all floors.
