= Seri Setia Bridge =

Bridge in Putrajaya, Malaysia

Seri Setia Bridge Jambatan Seri Setia
- Coordinates: 2°54′37″N 101°41′10″E
- Carries: Motor vehicles, Pedestrians
- Crosses: Putrajaya Lake
- Locale: Lebuh Seri Setia
- Official name: Seri Setia Bridge
- Maintained by: Perbadanan Putrajaya

Characteristics
- Design: box girder bridge
- Total length: --
- Width: --
- Longest span: --

History
- Designer: Perbadanan Putrajaya
- Constructed by: Perbadanan Putrajaya
- Opened: 2005

Location
- Interactive map of Seri Setia Bridge

Seri Setia Bridge is a main bridge in Putrajaya, Malaysia.

The Seri Setia Bridge is located in the southeastern corner of Putrajaya, providing a vital link between Precinct 19 and the Commercial Precinct, and the main route to the core island from the southeast. Made up of eight equal spans of 30 metres each, the bridge has lancet-arch designs on its railing that complement the fascia panels on its side.

Among the features of this bridge are precast fascia panels, planter boxes on the medians, railings with architectural features and illuminations with decorative lightings.

== See also ==
- Transport in Malaysia
