= Putra Mosque =

Mosque in Putrajaya, Malaysia

- Masjid Putra مسجد ڤوترا
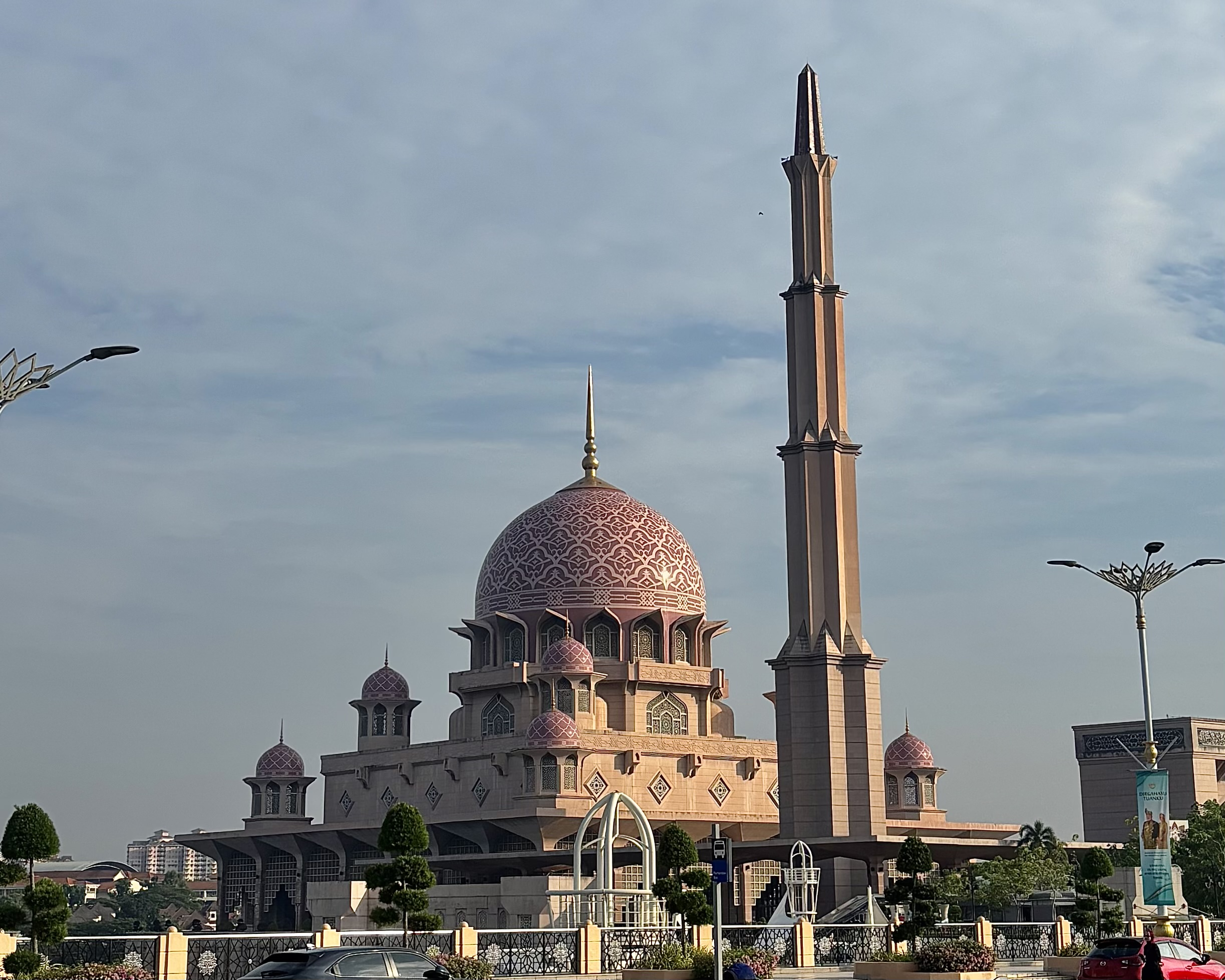
- Putra Mosque in 2026

- Location within Peninsular Malaysia

Religion
- Affiliation: Sunni Islam

Location
- Location: Putrajaya, Malaysia
- Interactive map of Putra Mosque
- Coordinates: 2°56′9.84″N 101°41′20.58″E

Architecture
- Type: Mosque
- Style: Islamic, Modern, Mamluk (arch), Moorish
- Completed: 1999
- Construction cost: MYR 250 million

Specifications
- Capacity: 15,000
- Dome: 9
- Dome height (outer): 50 m (160 ft)
- Minaret: 1
- Minaret height: 116 m (381 ft)

The Putra Mosque (Malay: Masjid Putra; Jawi: مسجد ڤوترا) is the principal mosque of Putrajaya, Malaysia. Construction of the mosque began in 1997 and was completed two years later.

It is located on Putra Square and is adjacent to man-made Putrajaya Lake.

The pink-domed Putra Mosque is constructed with rose-tinted granite and consists of three main functional areas – the prayer hall, the Sahn, or courtyard, and various learning facilities and function rooms. The mosque can accommodate 15,000 worshippers at any one time.

On 25 June 1999, Prime Minister Mahathir Mohamad went to Putra Mosque for prayers.

== Photo gallery ==
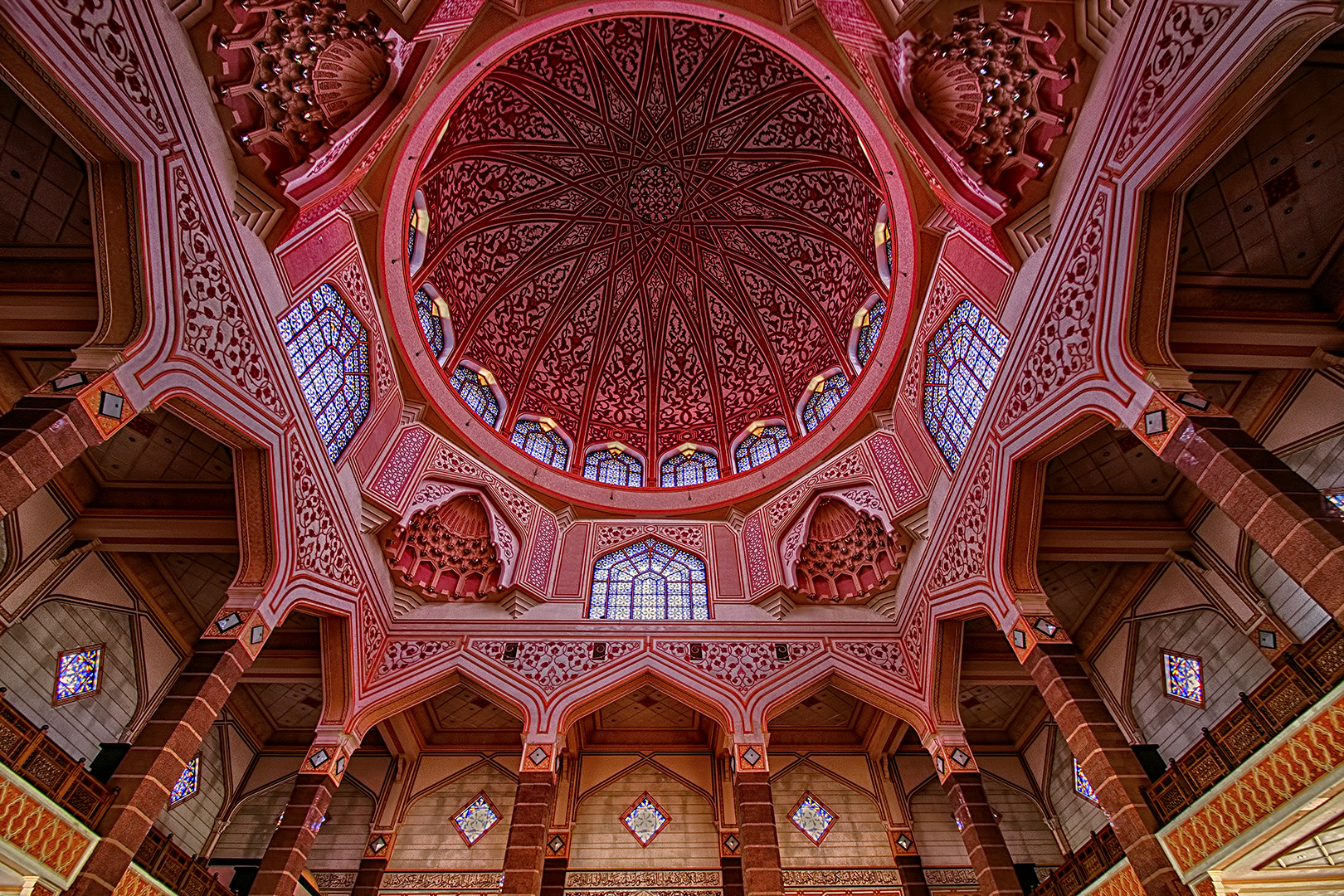
Interior view of the mosque.

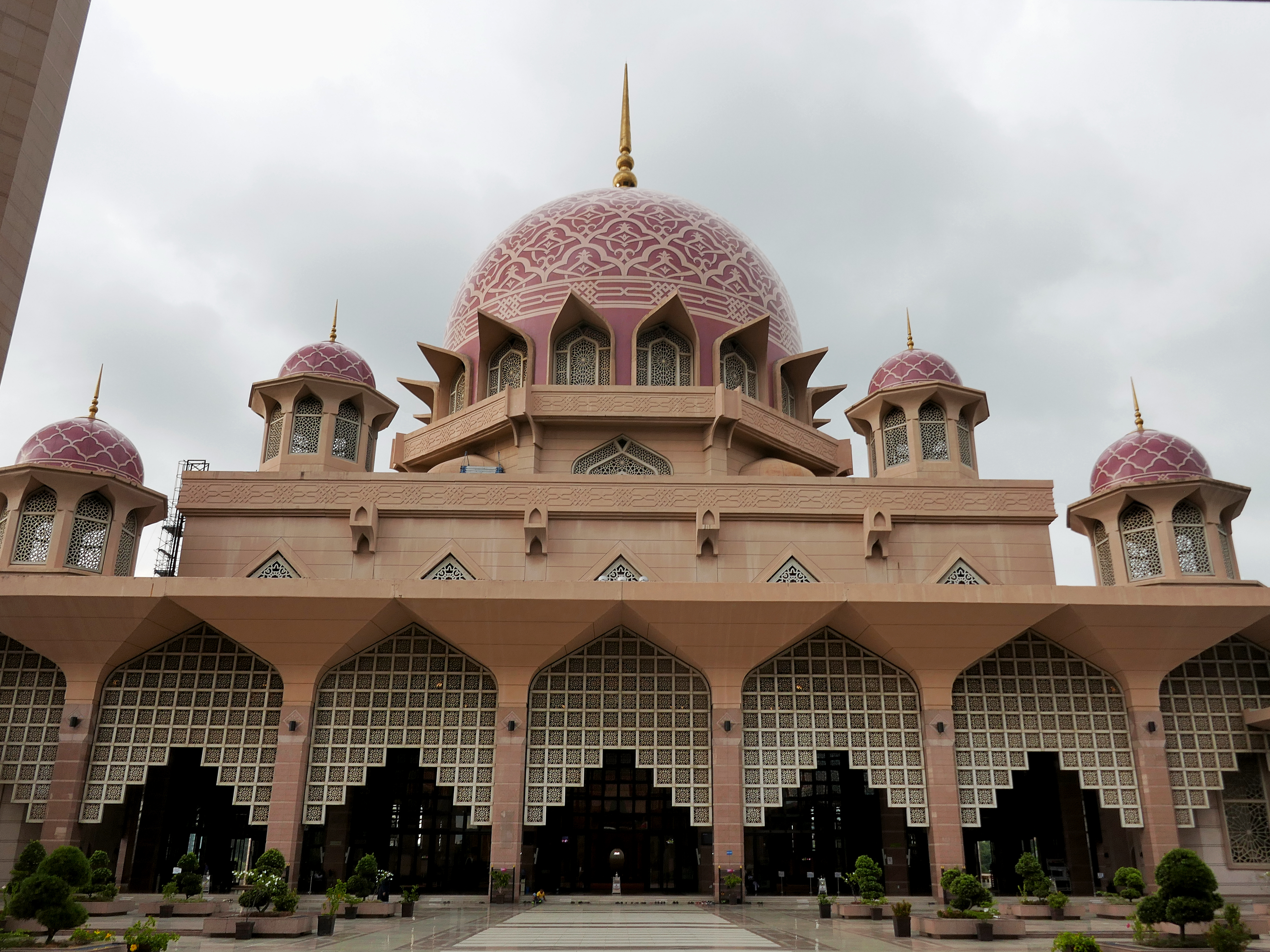
The main prayer hall.

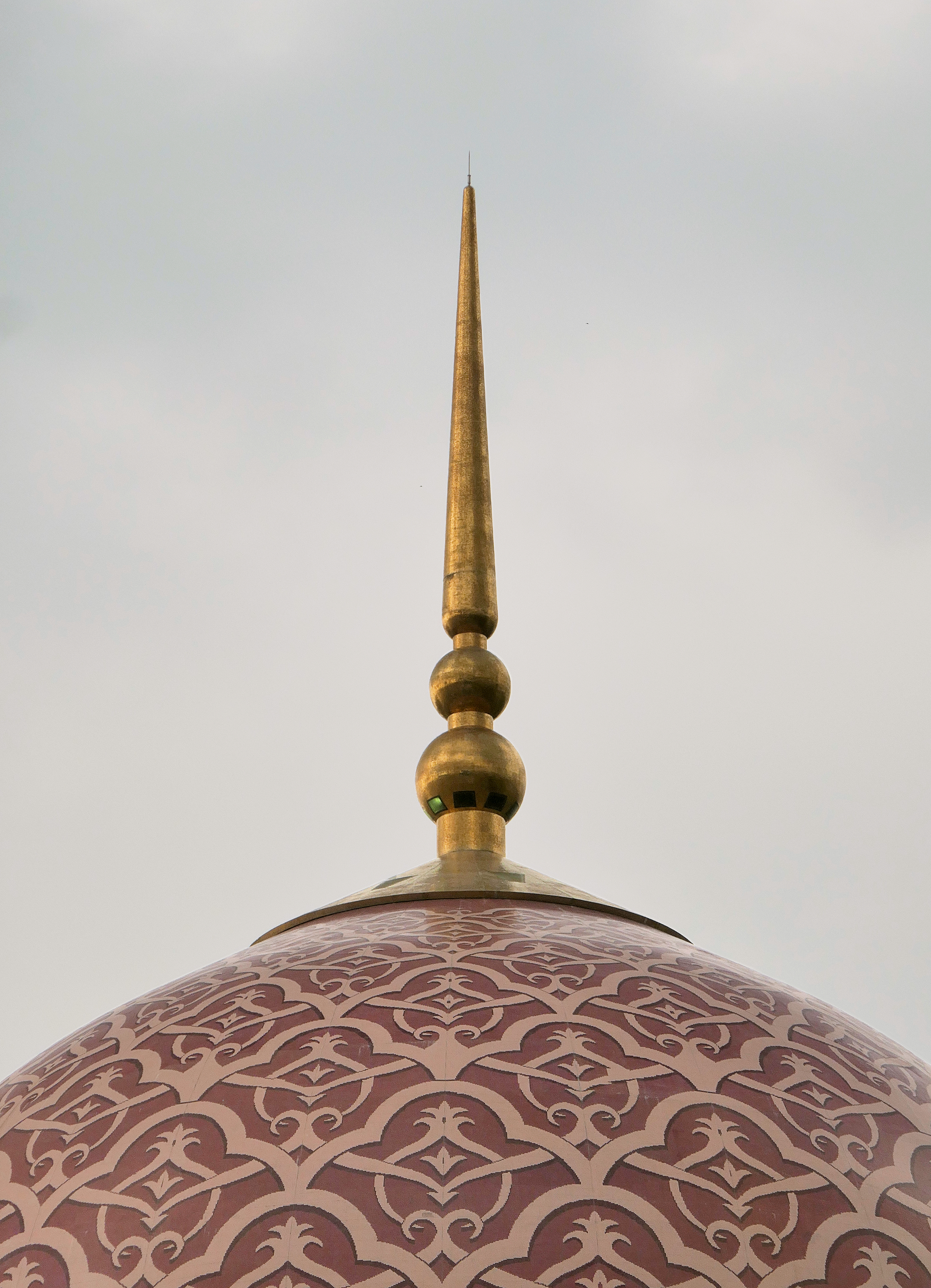
The patterned dome of pink and white granite tiles is a distinctive feature.

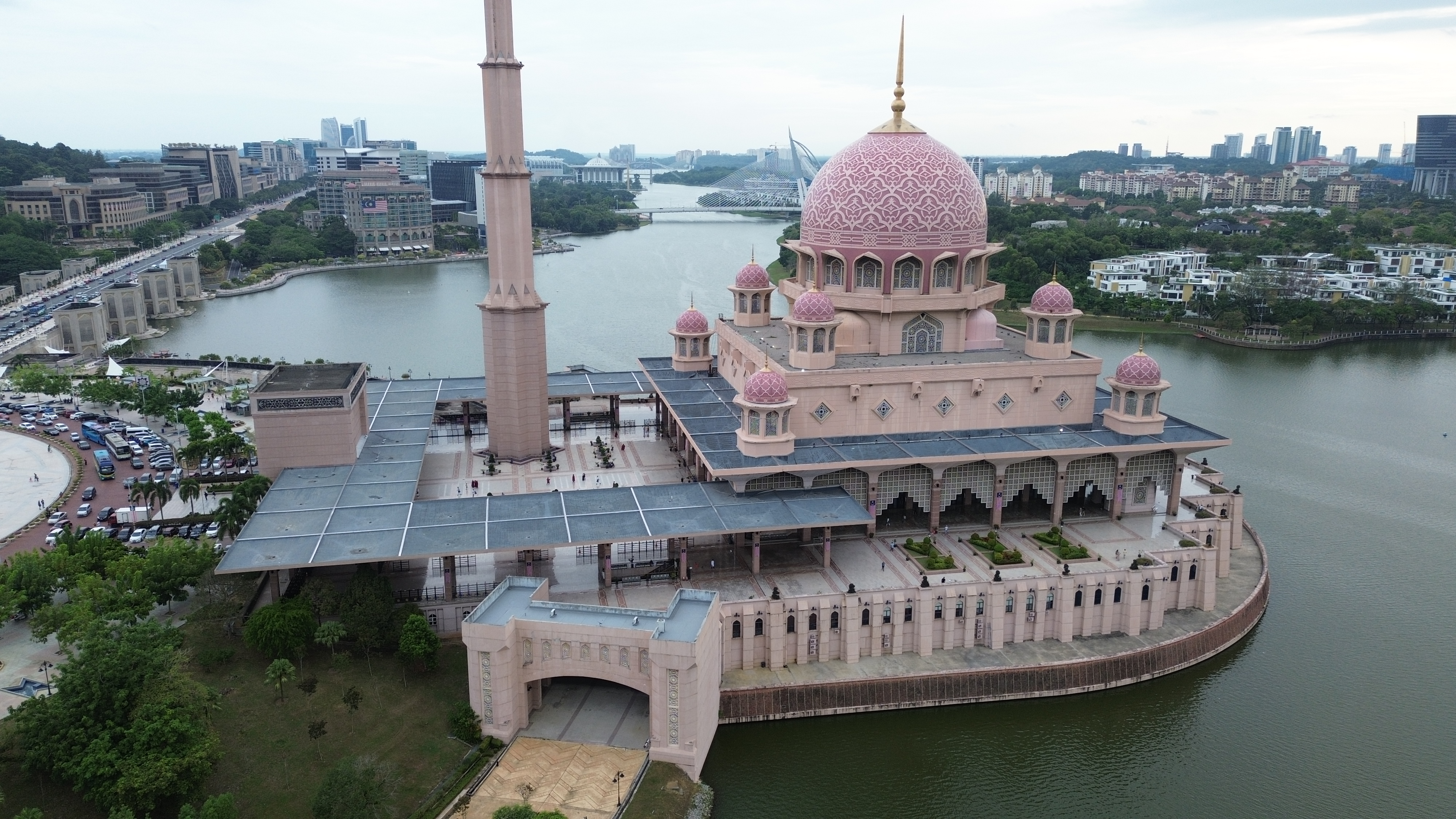
Exterior view.

== See also ==
- Islam in Malaysia
- List of tallest minarets
