= List of botanical gardens in Malaysia =

Botanical gardens in Malaysia have collections consisting entirely of Malaysia native and endemic species; most have a collection that include plants from around the world. There are botanical gardens and arboreta in all states and territories of Malaysia, most are administered by local governments, some are privately owned.

- Cameron Highlands Botanical Park, Cameron Highlands
- Labuan Botanical Garden, Labuan
- Malacca Botanical Garden, Malacca
- Kuching Aquarium and Botanical Garden, Kuching
- Penang Botanic Gardens, George Town
- Putrajaya Botanical Garden, Putrajaya
- Perdana Botanical Gardens, Kuala Lumpur
- Rimba Ilmu Botanical Gardens, Kuala Lumpur
- Taiping Botanical Gardens, Taiping
- UMS Botanical Garden, Kota Kinabalu
- Zaharah Botanical Gardens, Johor Bahru
- Johor Botanical Garden, Sri Medan, Johor
- National Botanical Garden Shah Alam, Shah Alam, Selangor Darul Ehsan
