= Millennium Monument =

Millennium Monument may refer to:

- Millennium Monument (Russia) (1862)
- Millennium Monument of Brest, Belarus
- Millennium Monument (Budapest) (1904), the central feature in Budapest's Heroes' Square
- China Millennium Monument, Beijing (1999)
- Kolonna Eterna, San Gwann (2003)
- Millennium Monument (Chicago) (2002)
- Millennium Monument (Malaysia) (2003)
