= Kampung Ayer Kuning =

Temuan Orang Asli village in Shah Alam, Selangor, Malaysia

Kampung Ayer Kuning Kampung Orang Asli Air Kuning
- Temuan Orang Asli village
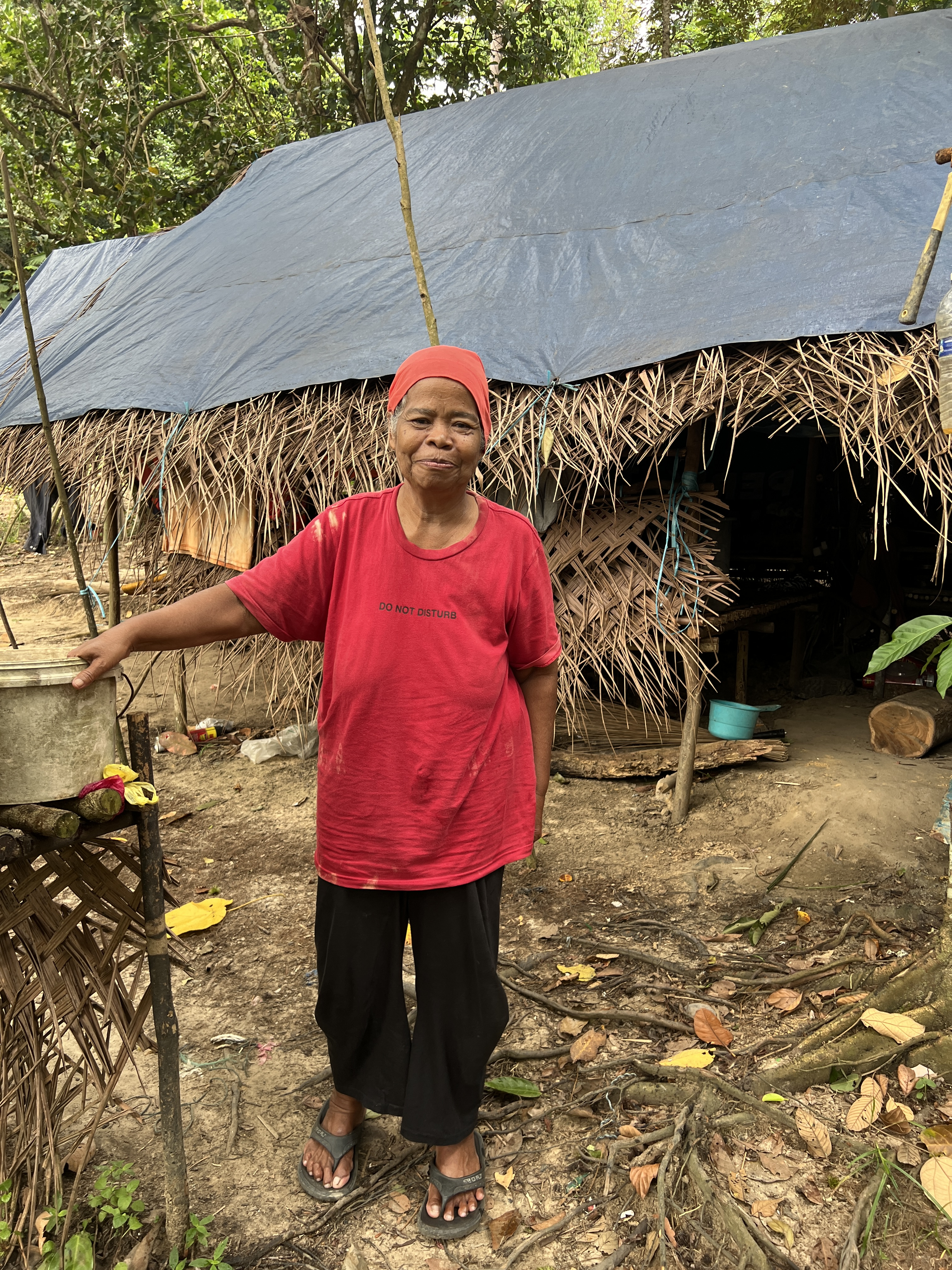
- A Temuan woman in front of a traditional building in Kampung Ayer Kuning

- Location in Selangor, Malaysia Kampung Ayer Kuning (Malaysia)
- Coordinates: 3.0967487111°N 101.4987304194°E
- Country: Malaysia
- State: Selangor
- District: Petaling
- City: Shah Alam
- Federal constituency: Shah Alam
- State constituency: Kota Anggerik

Government
  - Type: Orang Asli village committee
  - Body: Orang Asli Village Development and Security Committee (JPKKOA)
- Time zone: UTC+8 (MST)

Kampung Ayer Kuning, also commonly written Kampung Air Kuning and officially referred to as Kampung Orang Asli Air Kuning, is a Temuan Orang Asli village at Bukit Bandaraya in Shah Alam, Petaling District, Selangor, Malaysia. It lies near the southern part of the Bukit Cherakah Forest Reserve and approximately 2 kilometres (1.2 mi) from the National Botanical Garden Shah Alam.

The community has longstanding cultural and subsistence connections with the forests of northern Shah Alam, particularly the area now known as the Shah Alam Community Forest (SACF). The forest continues to provide plants, fruit, bamboo and rattan used by members of the community.

== Community ==
Kampung Ayer Kuning is predominantly inhabited by the Temuan people, one of the Proto-Malay groups classified as Orang Asli in Peninsular Malaysia.

An earlier state government record listed 33 households and 135 residents at Kampung Air Kuning. A later community profile published by Sedunia recorded 151 people living in 74 families. Differences between published population figures may reflect changes in population and differences in the dates and methods of enumeration.

The village is administered through an Orang Asli Village Development and Security Committee (Malay: Jawatankuasa Pembangunan dan Keselamatan Kampung Orang Asli, JPKKOA).

== History and customary land ==
=== Traditional territory ===
The Temuan community of Air Kuning traditionally used a substantially larger area of forest in northern Shah Alam than the area occupied by the present-day village. Community representatives have described the surrounding forest, orchards and ancestral burial sites as part of their customary territory.

According to village committee chairman Abdul Rahman, known as Wak Apuk, the community's traditional territory once extended across several hundred acres before successive development projects reduced the area accessible to the village. In 2022, the community was seeking recognition of approximately 46 acres (19 ha) as tanah adat, or customary land.

Customary-land mapping involving Kampung Air Kuning had previously been recorded by the Selangor government. In a state legislative assembly response covering Orang Asli customary-land mapping undertaken between July 2013 and June 2014, mapping for Kampung Air Kuning in Petaling District was listed as still in progress.

=== Bukit Cherakah and Bukit Bandaraya development ===
Community representatives state that parts of their traditional forest were progressively affected by development in northern Shah Alam. According to an account published by the Shah Alam Community Forest Society, approximately 73 acres (30 ha) of forest traditionally used by the community became part of the Bukit Cherakah Agricultural Park when it was established in 1986. The park was subsequently renamed the National Botanical Garden Shah Alam.

A further area identified by the community as customary land was later incorporated into the development of Bukit Bandaraya. The same account states that approximately 272 acres (110 ha) was affected by the development.

Selangor government records independently identify Kampung Orang Asli Air Kuning in Shah Alam as one of the Orang Asli settlements affected by residential or commercial development. A surveying firm's project list also records a privatisation and resettlement project for the Air Kuning Orang Asli settlement in Section U11, Shah Alam, involving Lebar Daun Development Sdn Bhd, formerly Ecoasli Development Sdn Bhd.

== Resettlement and outstanding commitments ==
A development agreement relating to the Air Kuning community was made in 2001. During proceedings of the Selangor State Legislative Assembly in August 2021, the issue of housing provided under the agreement between the developer Lebar Daun and the Air Kuning Orang Asli community was discussed by state representatives.

The status of assets and compensation arising from Orang Asli resettlement in Petaling District was raised again in the state assembly in July 2022 by Elizabeth Wong. The state government identified Air Kuning as one of four Orang Asli villages in Petaling District and stated that unresolved returns of land, assets or compensation remained in three of the four affected villages.

The state government said that discussions had been held with the developers involved and that they had been asked to provide written guarantees specifying when the outstanding obligations would be fulfilled. It also stated that some obligations could not be completed because of the financial capacity of the developers, and that a task force had been established to hold regular meetings aimed at resolving the outstanding matters.

In its account of the Air Kuning case, the Shah Alam Community Forest Society reported that the original development arrangement included bungalow houses for 21 families and additional housing for younger members of the community. The bungalow houses were built, but other promised housing had not been delivered by 2022.

The same article reported that, in a July 2022 reply in the Selangor State Legislative Assembly, Selangor Menteri Besar Amirudin Shari confirmed that 53 housing units associated with the Lebar Daun development agreement—30 flats and 23 low-cost houses—had not been delivered to the Orang Asli community. It also reported that RM1.375 million in promised welfare, education and living-expense funds remained outstanding.

== Relationship with the forest ==
The remaining forest around the village continues to play an important role in the community's daily life and cultural practices. The Shah Alam Community Forest lies immediately beside the settlement, and Kampung Ayer Kuning is the closest Temuan settlement to the forest.

Villagers continue to enter the forest to gather herbs, fruit, bamboo and rattan. Community representatives have stated that some cempedak and durian trees found in the forest were planted by earlier or present members of the village.

The forest is also a source of traditional plant knowledge. Villagers have transplanted some plants collected from the forest into areas around their homes in an attempt to preserve them. These include plants traditionally used as herbs as well as wild varieties of banana. The community has expressed concern that such plant varieties and the knowledge associated with them may disappear if the remaining forest is lost.

Community members also collect several sour forest fruits traditionally used in Temuan cooking, including asam kura, asam kandis and asam tambun.

== Culture and beliefs ==
Members of the Air Kuning community have adopted Islam while continuing to practise elements of traditional Temuan adat, particularly customs associated with ancestral land and burial.

Village representatives have described ancestral graves as an important basis of the community's connection with its customary territory. Traditional funerary practices described by community members include rituals carried out before burial and the preparation of the grave according to inherited customs.

Wak Apuk has described the community's relationship with the forest as one based on limited and sustainable collection rather than large-scale clearing. In the community's account, this approach forms part of customary rules governing the use of ancestral forest.

== Conservation issues ==
The reduction of forest around the settlement has become an important issue for the community. Development of Bukit Bandaraya, changes associated with the former Bukit Cherakah Agricultural Park and proposals affecting the Shah Alam Community Forest have progressively altered the landscape surrounding Kampung Ayer Kuning.

In April 2021, objections were submitted in relation to proposals in the Shah Alam City Council local plan for a road and cemetery within the Shah Alam Community Forest. Representatives of Kampung Ayer Kuning were also involved in discussions with state agencies concerning the forest and their customary-land claims.

Those discussions involved representatives from agencies including the Selangor Forestry Department, Shah Alam City Council, the state Land Office, the National Botanical Garden Shah Alam and the Selangor State Economic Planning Unit, as well as the state executive councillor responsible for Orang Asli affairs.

The village's dependence on the remaining forest has also been documented in a 2024 short documentary, The Forest is Getting Smaller: A Malaysian Indigenous Story, which focused on the effects of shrinking forest areas on the Air Kuning community.

== Geography ==
Kampung Ayer Kuning is located at Bukit Bandaraya in the northern part of Shah Alam, within Petaling District. The village lies close to the Bukit Cherakah Forest Reserve, the National Botanical Garden Shah Alam and the Shah Alam Community Forest.

The settlement is divided from parts of the surrounding forest by roads and newer urban development. Residential neighbourhoods of northern Shah Alam have expanded around the traditional settlement, creating a sharp transition between the Orang Asli village, secondary forest and modern housing areas.

Administratively, a Klang Valley landscape assessment lists Kampung Orang Asli Air Kuning under Petaling District, the Shah Alam parliamentary constituency and the Kota Anggerik state constituency.

== See also ==
- Temuan people
- Orang Asli
- Shah Alam Community Forest
- Bukit Cherakah
- National Botanical Garden Shah Alam
- Indigenous land rights
