= China Millennium Monument =

Monument in Haidian, Beijing, China

Coordinates: 39°54′41″N 116°19′16″E

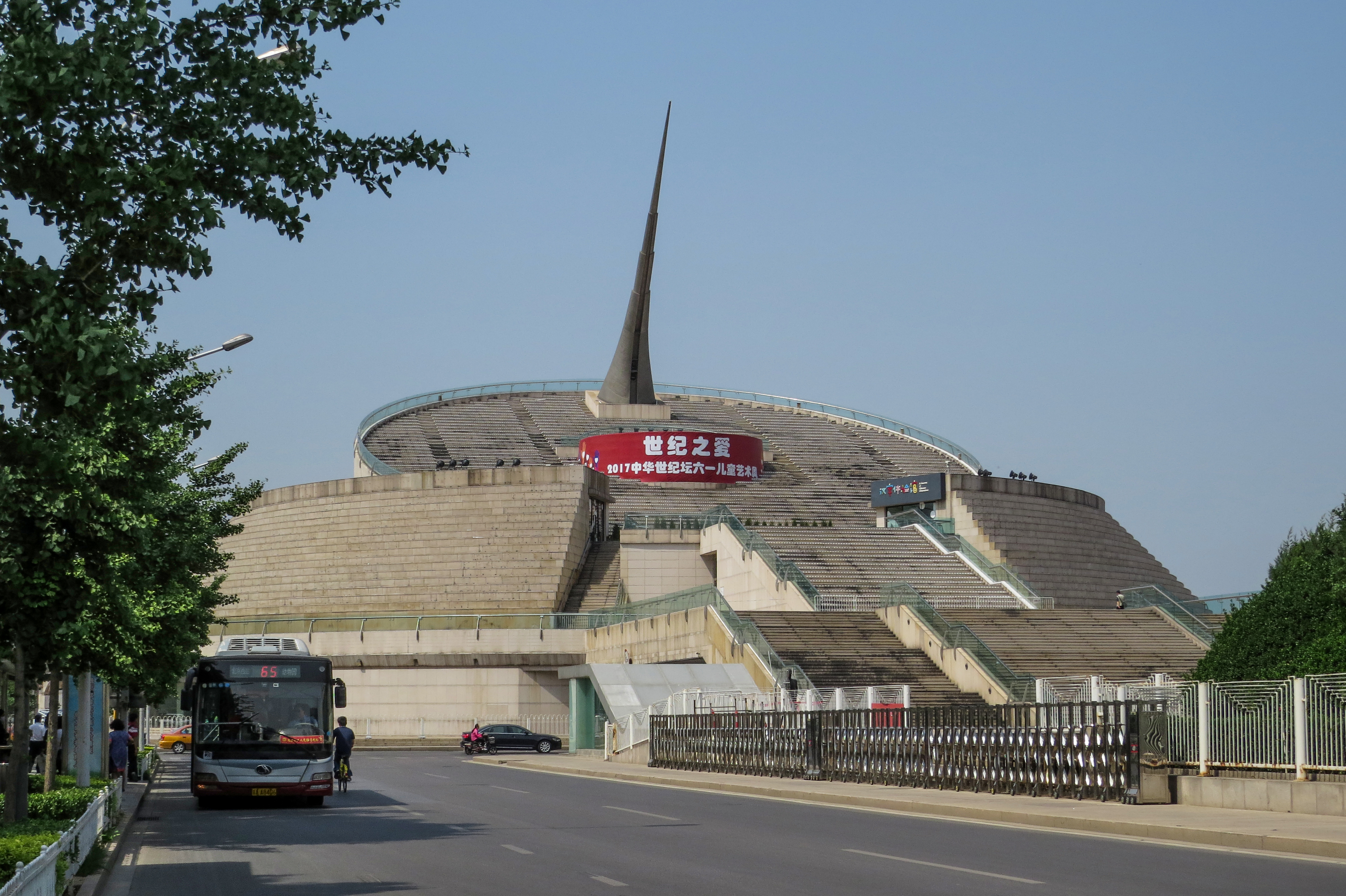
China Millennium Monument in June 2017

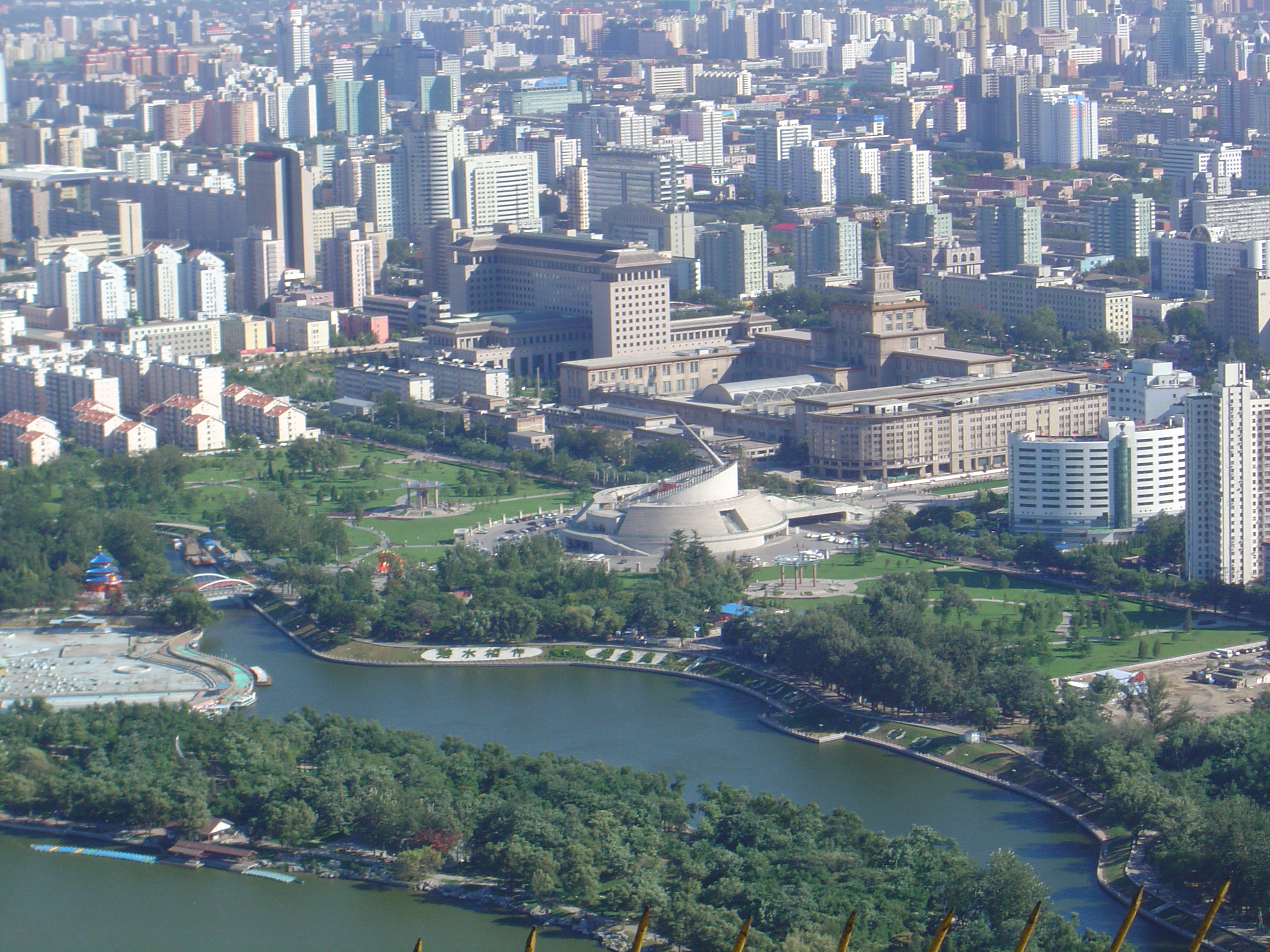
Millennium Monument, with its rotating platform pointing northeast, viewed from Beijing's Central Radio & TV Tower across Yuyuantan Park. The August 1st Building of the Central Military Commission and the Military Museum of the Chinese People's Revolution are visible behind the monument

The China Millennium Monument (simplified Chinese: 中华世纪坛; traditional Chinese: 中華世紀壇; pinyin: Zhōnghuá shìjì tán) is a monumental complex centered around a structure that evokes both a monumental Chinese altar and a sundial. Associated with Jiang Zemin, it was championed from 1994 by CCP official Zhu Xiangyuan. It was completed in 1999 ahead of the Millennium celebrations, for which it was the principal Chinese venue. Since 2006, it has housed the Beijing World Art Museum.

== Name and symbolism ==
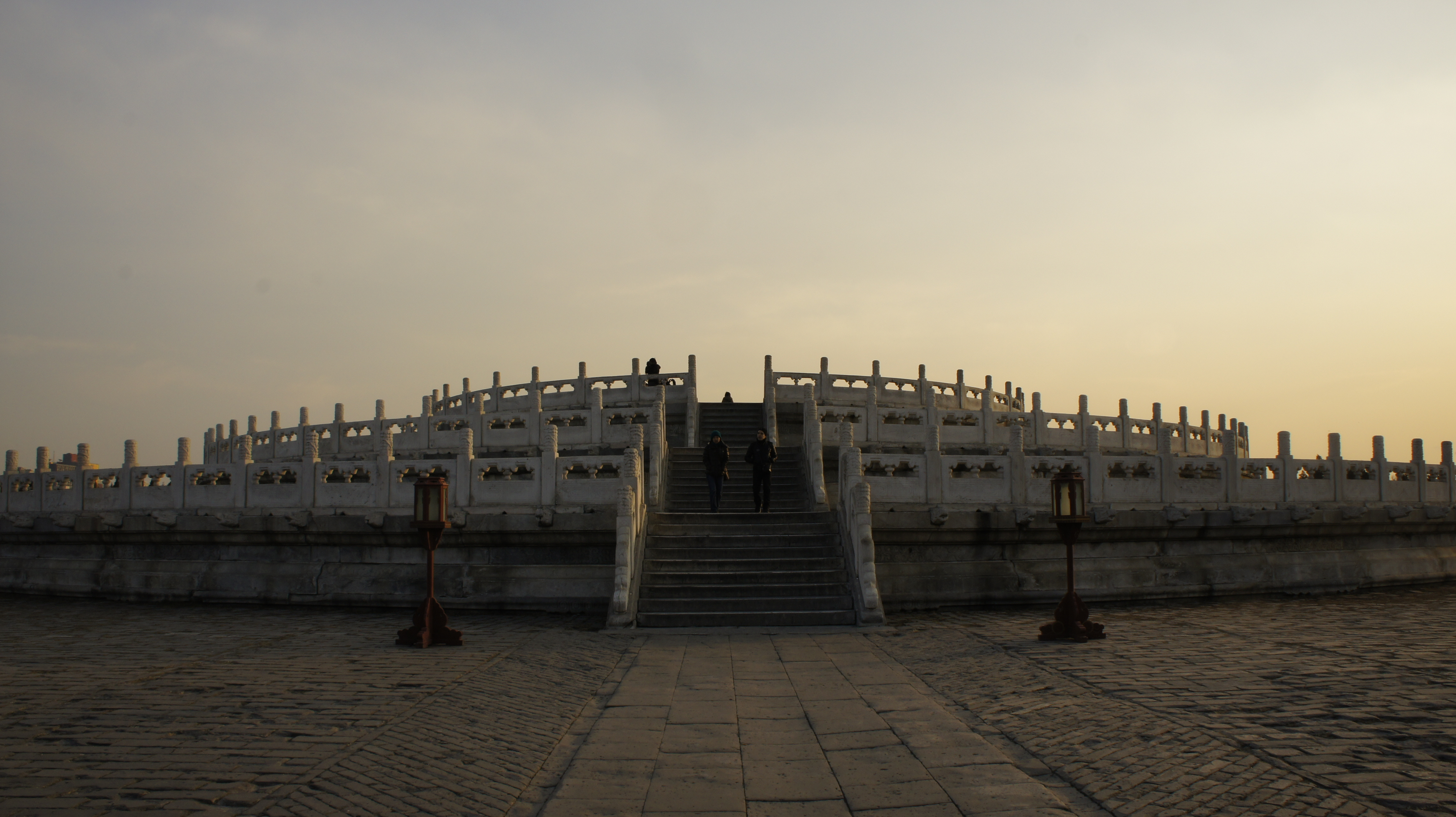
Circular Mound Altar at the Temple of Heaven, Beijing

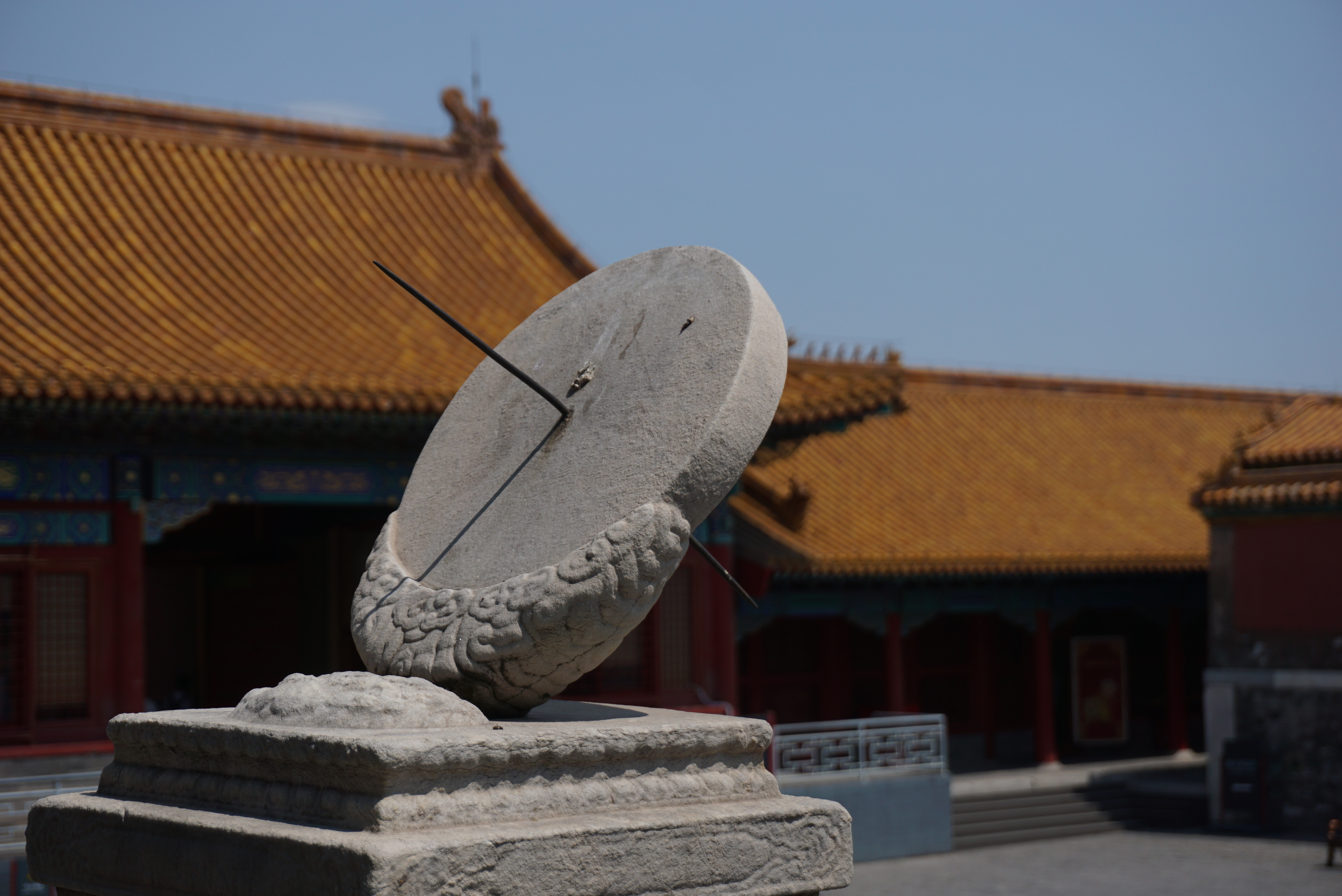
Sundial in the Forbidden City

The monument is branded as a monumental altar (simplified Chinese: 坛; traditional Chinese: 壇; pinyin: tán), echoing the nine altars that have punctuated the symbolic landscape of Beijing since at least the Ming dynasty. Its architecture also echoes elevated altars where Chinese emperors practiced official rites, such as the Circular Mound Altar at the Temple of Heaven, the Altar and the Home of Shangdi, The Supreme Deity of Chinese Mythology and Theology, and the Altar of Land and Grain near the Forbidden City, and traditional Chinese sundials as also found in the Forbidden City. More generally, the monument is imbued with references to ancient Chinese philosophy, Chinese geomancy, Chinese numerology and Bagua, as well as themes more specifically connected to 20th-century Chinese Communist Party discourse such as the harmony of China's 56 ethnic groups. Like other initiatives such as the creation of Confucius Institutes from 2004, it has been associated with CCP efforts to re-embrace pre-Communist Chinese legacies after the less history-obsessed approach of Deng Xiaoping.

The monument's name in Chinese also includes an expression (simplified Chinese: 世纪; traditional Chinese: 世紀; pinyin: shìjì) that depending on context may refer to a century or a less precisely defined epoch or era, and is rendered as "millennium" in the monument's official name in English. The CCP discourse about the monument has emphasized the reference to five thousand years of Chinese nationhood, rather than the new millennium associated with the year 2000 of the Gregorian calendar. It was completed just in time to be the centerpiece of the Millennium celebrations in China, at a cost of 200 million Chinese yuan, but its official inauguration was delayed until Chinese New Year on 5 February 2000. Altogether, the monument's Chinese name can be read literally either as "altar within China dedicated to the new century" or as "altar dedicated to a new Chinese century", thus preserving some ambiguity as to the intensity of its nationalistic intent.

Around the time of inauguration, the monument's was strongly associated with the leadership role of Jiang Zemin. A 2000 CCP celebratory poster by propaganda artist Liu Xiqi features Jiang together with his predecessors Mao Zedong and Deng Xiaoping, each flanked with representative architectural icons: Tiananmen Gate for Mao, the Hong Kong skyline for Deng (as architect of the handover of Hong Kong), and for Jiang, the China Millennium Monument on one side and the Pudong District of Shanghai on the other. The monument was the main venue for the July 2001 celebration of Beijing's selection to host the 2008 Summer Olympics. There has been no comparably salient use of the monument since Jiang Zemin's official retirement.

== Description ==
=== Building ===
The monument faces south in accordance with Feng Shui principles, and is accessed through a monumental stairway. Its central structure, branded the Century Altar, features 20,000 m^{2} of exhibition space, much of it underground.

The Century Altar is structurally divided between a truncated conic base representing earth (Chinese: 坤; pinyin: Kūn) and a sundial-shaped rotunda representing heaven (Chinese: 乾; pinyin: Qián). The latter can rotate around a vertical axis and supports an inclined metal spire branded the "Time and Space Probing Pin" above a central circular platform. The base's diameter is 85 meters, and the rotating sundial's is 47 meters.

=== Interior decoration ===
The monument's central room is branded the Great Century Hall. At the center of that room, and thus of the entire monument, is a gilded pillar decorated with traditional Chinese imagery and surrounded by eight cylindric columns.

The Great Century Hall's 5-meter-high circular wall is adorned with episodes of idealized Chinese 5000-year-long history, sculpted in precious stone low relief. In the mid-2000s that sculpted frieze, described as the largest stone relief sculpture in China, was referred to in the monument's official documentation as "Ode to the Chinese Millenia" (pinyin: Zhonghua Qiqiu Song) and divided into four sections: "the rational spirit in Chinese civilization of the pre-Qin period (3000 BCE - 221 BCE); "the magnanimous spirit in Chinese civilization from the Han to the Tang dynasties" (221 BCE - 907 CE); "the loyal integrity during the period from the Song to the Qing dynasties" (960-1911); and "the historical duet of enlightenment and national salvation in recent and modern Chinese history" (1912-1999). It features heroic description of historic characters from Qin Shi Huang to Deng Xiaoping and ends with a calligraphy by Jiang Zemin that reads "The Chinese nation will achieve a great renaissance based on the final attainment of the unification of the motherland and the construction of a rich, powerful, democratic, and civilized socialist modern country."

On the upper level, a 140-meter-long circular corridor features 40 bronze statues of important figures of Chinese culture and science, and (on the rotating qián) 56 sculpted stone slabs representing China's officially recognized ethnic groups. The series of characters starts with political adviser Guan Zhong (c. 725-645 BCE) and ends with nuclear scientist Deng Jiaxian (1924-1986). Other individuals featured include Laozi, Confucius, Sima Qian, Zu Chongzhi, and for the modern era, Zhan Tianyou, Cai Yuanpei, Lu Xun, Guo Moruo, Mei Lanfang, Mao Dun, and Liang Sicheng. The statues, installed after 2005, are sponsored by individual donors, many of them businesspeople from Hong Kong. Another donor, Stanley Ho, is singled out on the monument's ground floor with a bronze bust celebrating his gift.

=== Monumental causeway ===
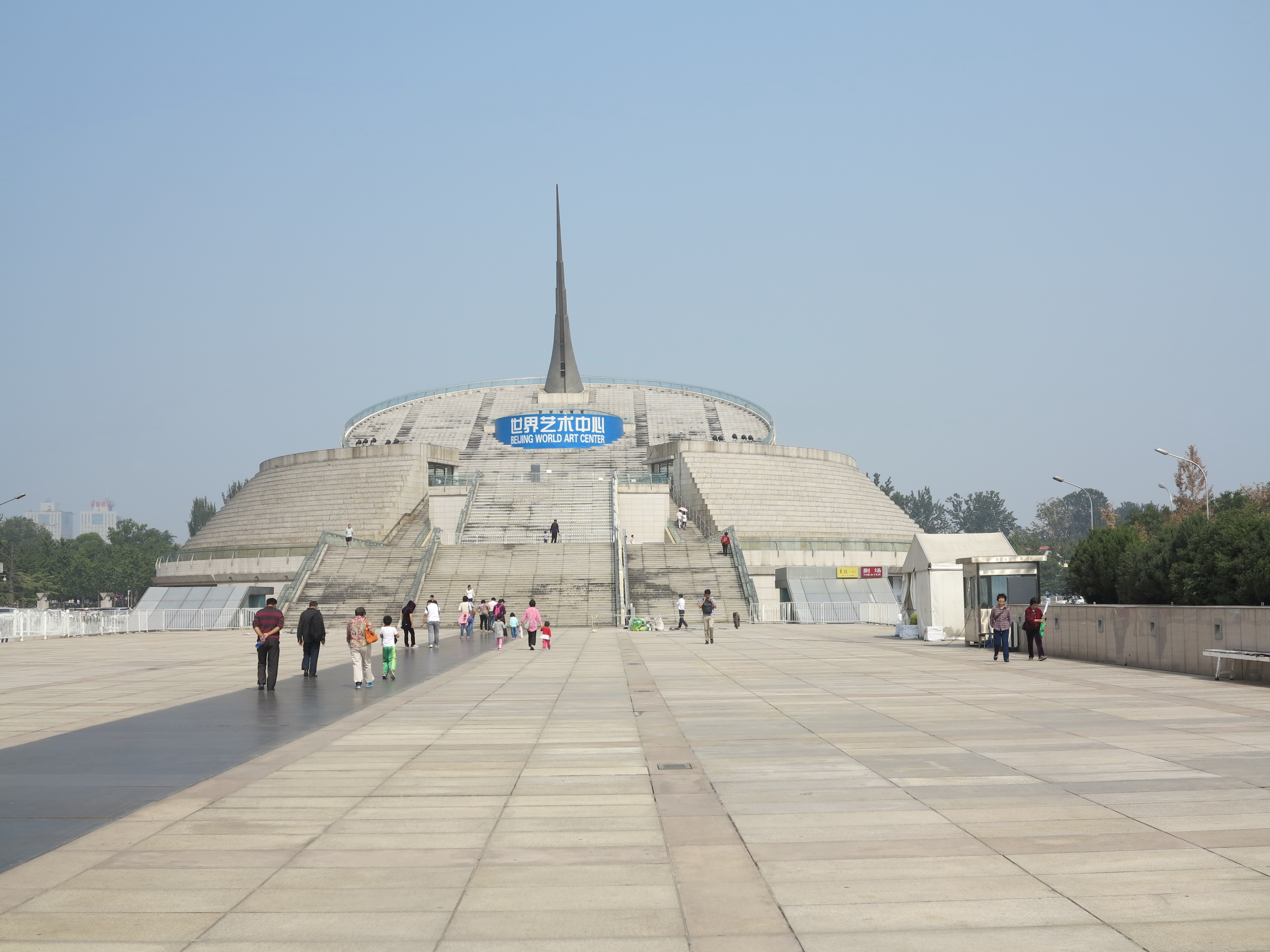
Tourists walking on the bronze thoroughfare

Leading to the monument is a monumental causeway that starts at the intersection of the monument's north–south axis with Fuxing Road, the western part of Beijing's major axis that becomes Chang'an Avenue further west. Just north of Fuxing Road is a screen bearing the monument's name calligraphed by Jiang Zemin, and a circular plaza flanked by two arcs of water, symbolizing China's two iconic rivers the Yellow River and the Yangtze. In the center of the plaza is a sunken square space with a permanently burning flame of "Chinese Holy Fire". (simplified Chinese: 中国圣火; traditional Chinese: 中國聖火; pinyin: Zhōngguó shènghuo), kindled in 1999 at the Zhoukoudian site where Peking Man was discovered in the 1920s, and symbolizing the continuity of human experience in China since times immemorial. The plaza's northern side features a map of China in a circular gilded medallion fringed by sculpted dragons. Between it and the monument's main structure is the 270-meters-long causeway proper or "bronze thoroughfare", a three-meter-wide installation with events of China's history inscribed on bronze plates, starting 300,000 years ago, on a year-by-year basis (some left blank) starting in 3,000 BCE, and with longer notices and indications of Chinese zodiac animals starting in 1901. The choice of events mentioned has been described as framed in a teleological narrative that legitimizes China's socialist revolution.

=== Millennium Monument Park ===
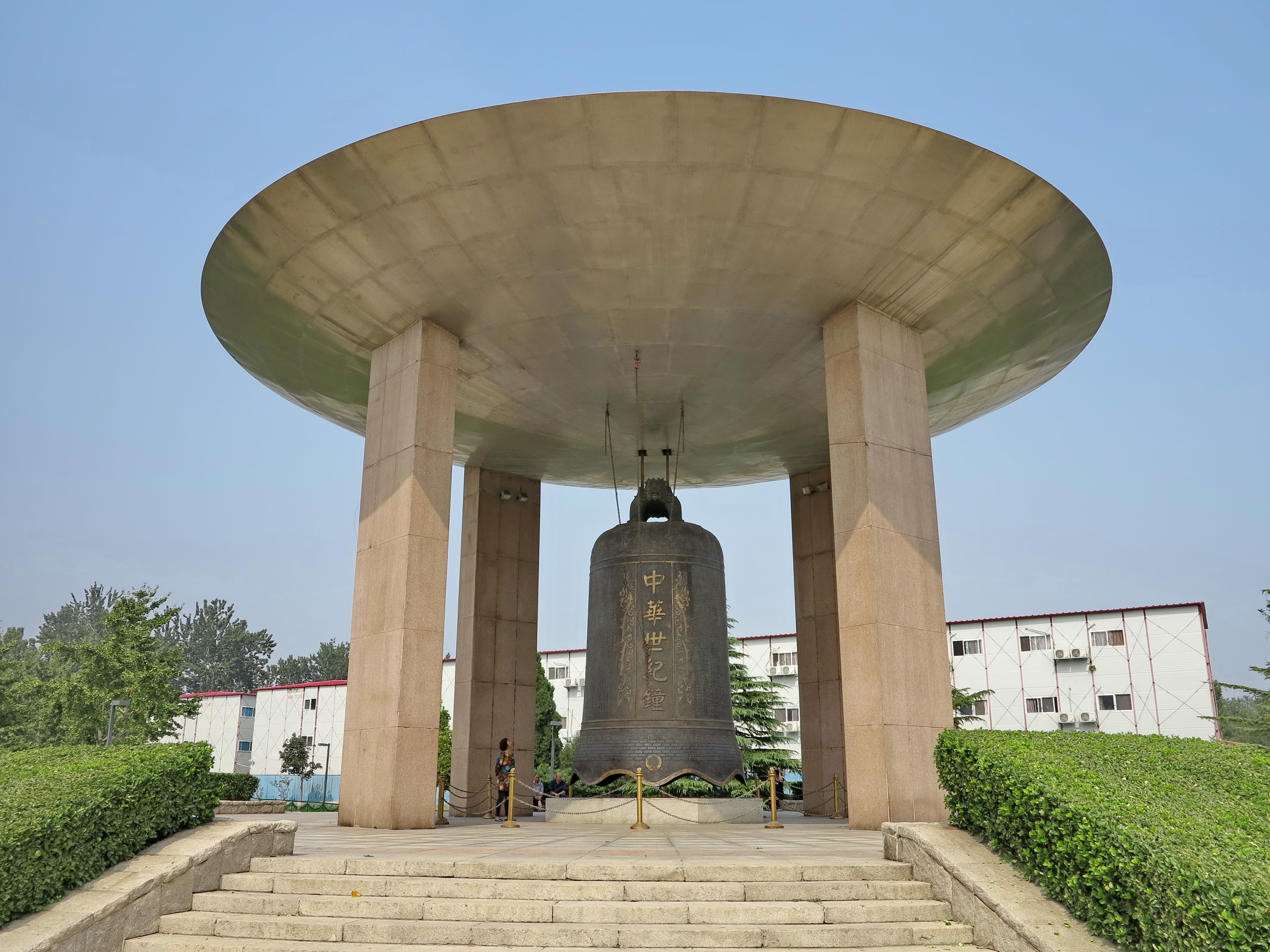
Century Bell in the monument's park

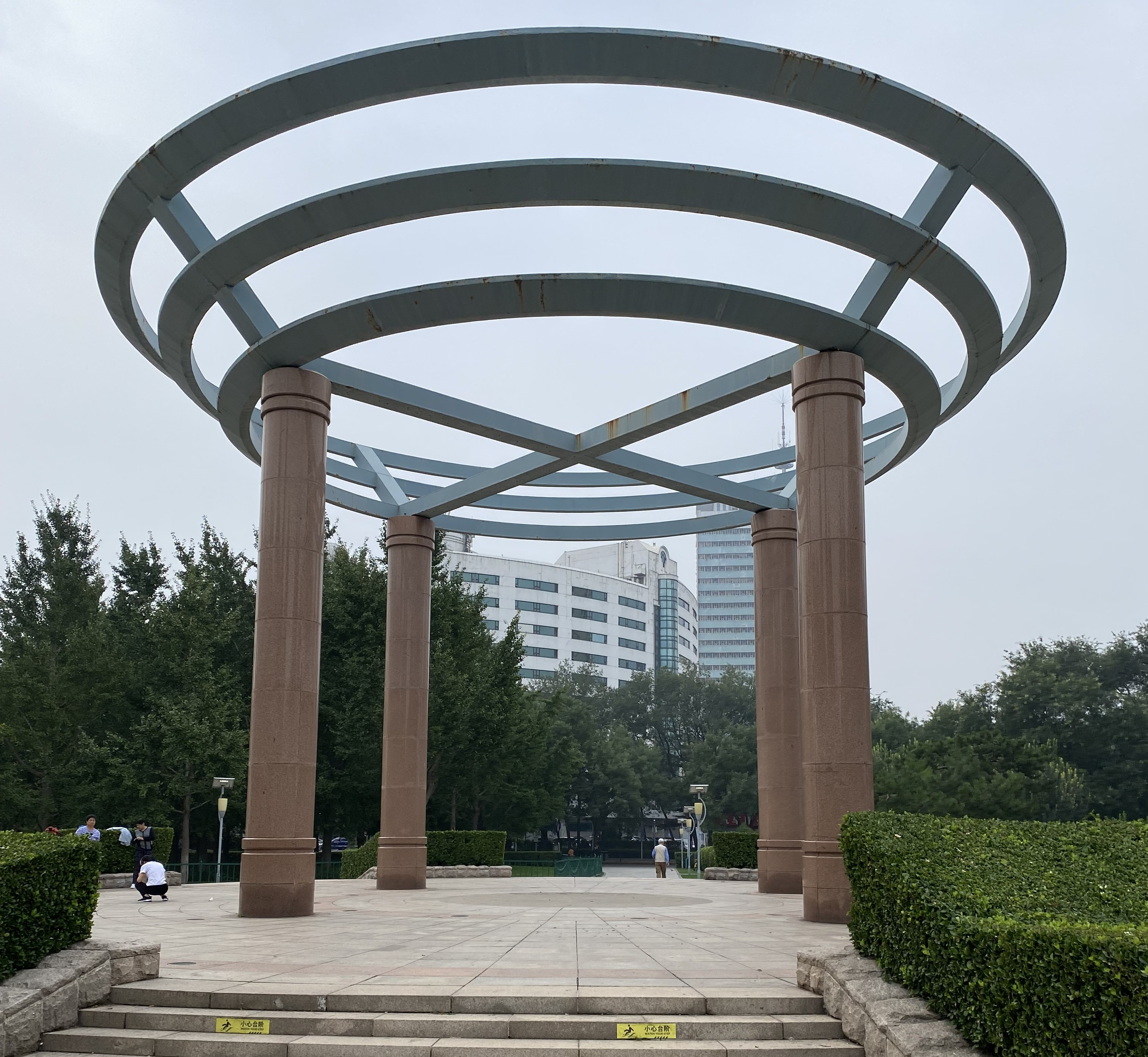
Western rotunda left empty

To its west, north and east, the monument is surrounded by a parking lot and beyond it, by a green space carved out from Yuyuantan Park, the Millennium Monument Park. The park features two rotundas on both sides of the monument. The eastern rotunda's pavilion features a monumental Chinese bell, branded the Century Bell, which celebrates China's progress during the 20th century that started with the humiliation of the 1901 Boxer Protocol and ended with the 1999 transfer of sovereignty over Macau back to the People's Republic of China. The western rotunda's pavilion has been left empty.

== Beijing World Art Museum ==
The Beijing World Art Museum was initially intended to host a permanent collection of non-Chinese art that would be displayed in two large halls, one for Western art and the other for non-Chinese Eastern art, flanking the central (Chinese) Century Hall on its respective western and eastern sides. No significant collection was assembled for that purpose, however, resulting in what scholar Wang Liwei, who was involved in the museum's preparatory work, has referred to in an UNESCO publication as "an embarrassing situation." To overcome that handicap, the museum decided in the mid-2000s to focus its activity and identity on temporary exhibitions.

The museum's inaugural exhibition in 2006 was titled "Mirroring the Age: Six Centuries of Italian Art" which was attended by 120,000 visitors. Exhibitions of the museum since then have included those on Contemporary American Realism in 2012, the first Beijing Photo Biennial in 2013, paintings by Xu Beihong in 2014, creations of the Sichuan Fine Arts Institute in 2018, works by Raphael in 2020–2021, and Egyptian mummies in 2021.

== See also ==
- Monument to the People's Heroes
- Monument to the People's Heroes (Shanghai)
- Museum of the Chinese Communist Party
- Millennium Monument (disambiguation)
