= National Monument (Malaysia) =

War memorial in Kuala Lumpur, Malaysia

Tugu Negara توݢو نݢارا
- Malaysia
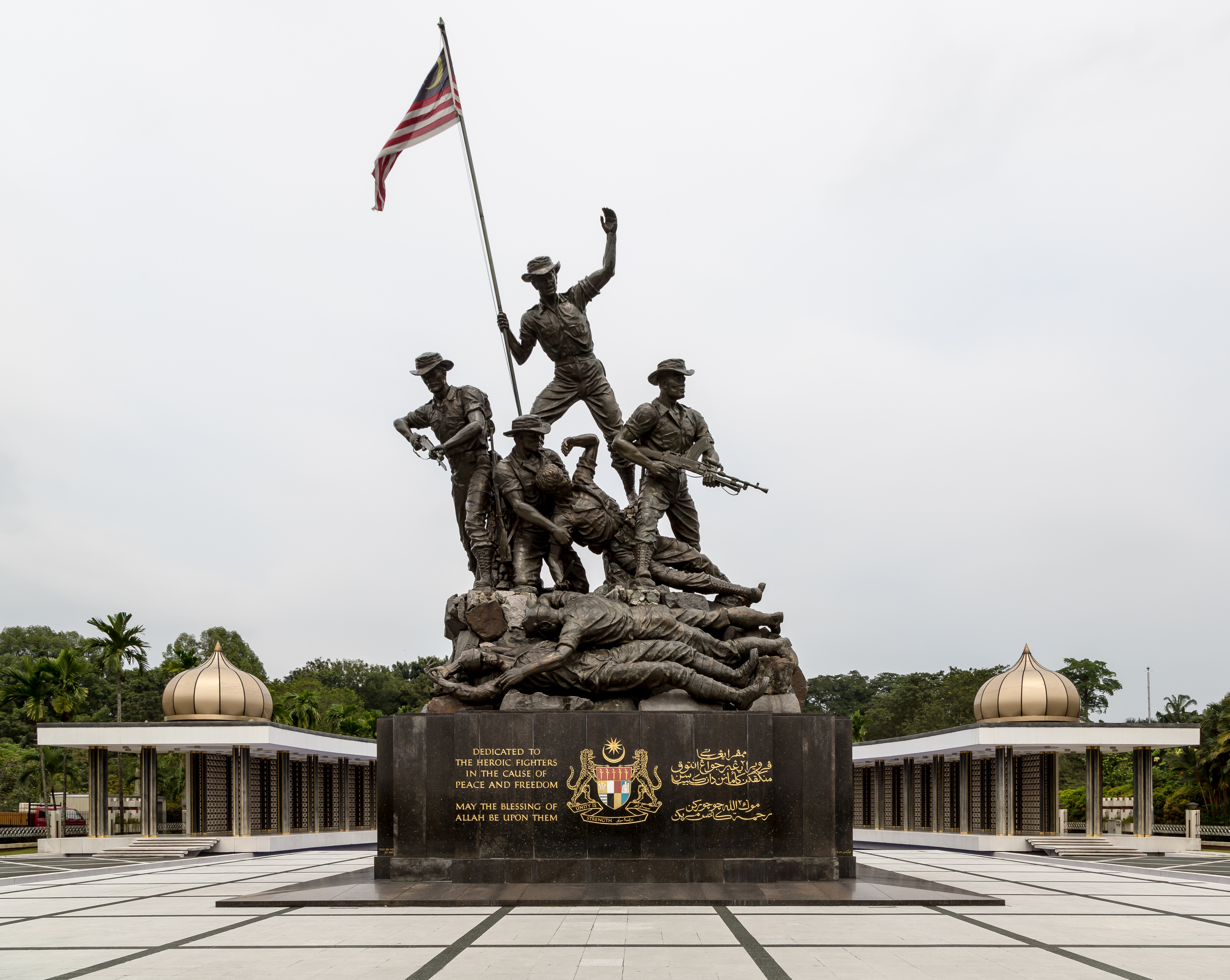
- For Malaysian military sacrifices during the struggle for freedom.
- Unveiled: February 8, 1966; 60 years ago
- Location: 3°8′55.9″N 101°41′1.8″E near Kuala Lumpur, Federal Territory
- Designed by: Felix de Weldon

The Tugu Negara (Jawi: توݢو نݢارا) is a national monument that commemorates those who died in Malaysia's struggle for freedom, principally against the Japanese occupation during World War II and the Malayan Emergency, which lasted from 1948 until 1960. It is located in the federal capital, Kuala Lumpur. The Malaysian Houses of Parliament is situated near the monument.

It is the world's tallest bronze freestanding sculpture grouping. Until 2010, on 31 July on Warriors' Day, the Yang di-Pertuan Agong, the prime minister, and the heads of the Malaysian Armed Forces and the Royal Malaysia Police paid their respects to the fallen heroes by laying garlands at the monument. The display had long been frowned upon by local conservatives; likeminded ministers under Najib Razak's government in 2010 released a statement discouraging the practice while moving the venue for future commemorations of Warriors' Day since to Merdeka Square and National Heroes Square.

== History ==
=== Kuala Lumpur Cenotaph ===
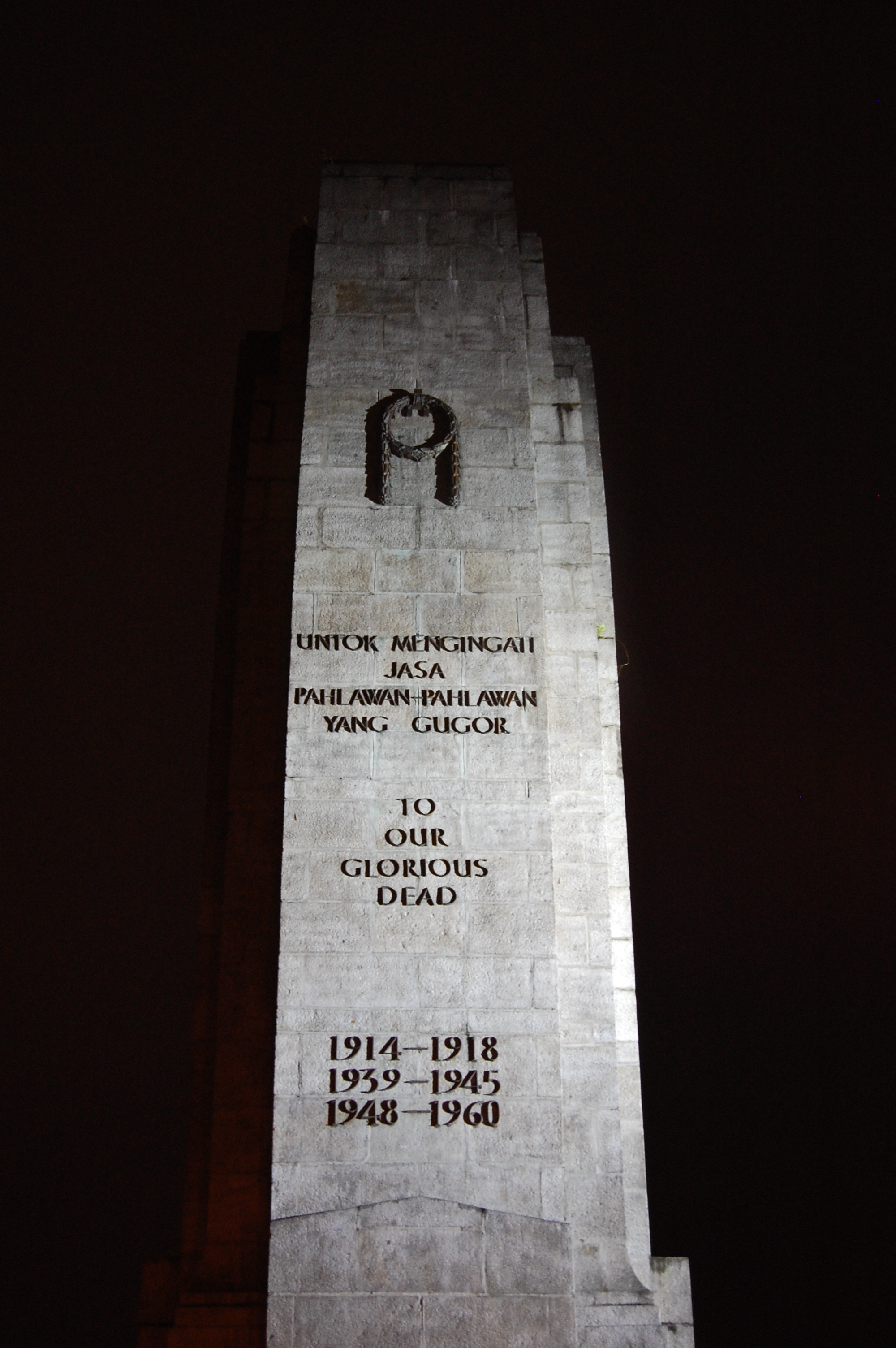
The Cenotaph near the National Monument

The predecessor of the Tugu Negara is an interwar-era cenotaph originally erected by the colonial British administration on a 10m flat grass-covered ground on a roundabout adjoining Victory Avenue (now part of Jalan Sultan Hishamuddin) and Raja Road, close to the Kuala Lumpur Railway Station and Railway Administration Building. Originally intended to commemorate the Great War (1914–1918) and honour those from the British Malayan colonies who were killed in the war, the cenotaph's inscription would later include fallen British Malayan soldiers of World War II (1939–1945) after its and resumption of British rule. Names of the fallen are engraved on plaques of the cenotaph as a tribute to their sacrifices.

In 1964, the cenotaph was moved from its original location to the site of the National Monument in Lake Gardens before a planned flyover connecting Jalan Sultan Hishamuddin and the Parliament roundabout was constructed over the original site. The transfer of the cenotaph was done by dismantling the structure into catalogued parts, allowing it to be transported in pieces and reassembled at its new location. Following its move, inscriptions were added to include fallen soldiers from the Malayan Emergency (1948–1960) and a Malay translation in pre-1972 Za'aba Spelling: "To Our Glorious Dead", "Untok Mengingati Jasa Pahlawan-pahlawan Yang Gugor" ("To Remember the Service of Warriors Who Have Fallen").

The monument is depicted on several Malaysian 1 ringgit banknotes issued between 1982 and 1989.

=== National Monument ===
The concept of a national monument was mooted by Malaysia's first prime minister, Tunku Abdul Rahman, who was inspired by the Marine Corps War Memorial during his visit to the United States in October 1960, before personally meeting Felix de Weldon for a favour to design the monument.

Felix de Weldon contributed in creating Malaysia's Tugu Negara (National Monument). He also designed the Iwo Jima Memorial located at Arlington, Washington DC.

The Tugu Negara was completed and officially opened on 8 February 1966, by Ismail Nasiruddin of Terengganu, then Yang di-Pertuan Agong. It was proclaimed a memorial park dedicated to the 11,000 people who died during the 12-year Malayan Emergency (1948–1960). Thereafter, a wreath-laying ceremony takes place at the monument every 31 July on Warriors Day. De Weldon was later conferred with the title Tan Sri, the Malaysian equivalent of a high-ranking knighthood.

On 26 August 1975, the monument suffered extensive damage due to an explosion set off by the communist guerrilla, Malayan Communist Party. It has since been restored to its original state by a four-person team led by Australian sculptor and Universiti Teknologi MARA lecturer Christopher Carney. The renovated statues were reunveiled on 11 May 1977. A fence was then erected and the complex was declared a protected area between sunset and dawn. Every day at dawn, a soldier raises the national flag and lowers it at dusk.

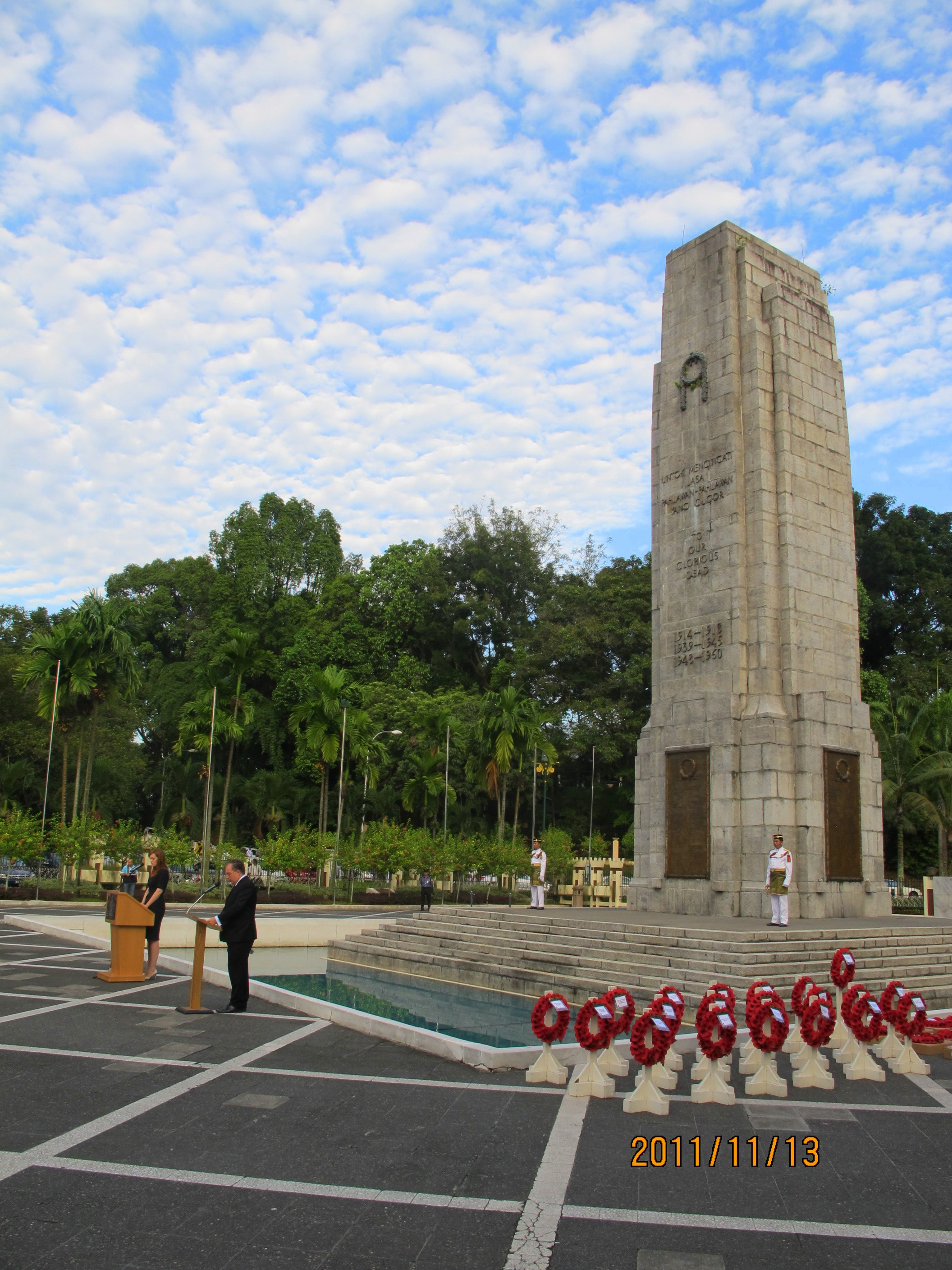
Although Warriors' Day commemoration services are no longer officially held at the National Monument, Remembrance Day ceremonies continue to take place there. Pictured is Remembrance Sunday at the National Monument's cenotaph on 13 November 2011.

In 2010, Religious Affairs Minister in the Prime Minister's Department Jamil Khir Baharom stated that the Warriors' Day commemoration service would be held elsewhere after Malaysia's National Fatwa Council guidelines declared the statues "un-Islamic" and potentially idolatrous. Defence Minister Zahid Hamidi added that a new "Warrior's Square" would be built in the country's administrative capital Putrajaya. When asked why the decision was made only after almost four decades of celebrating Warriors' Day at the present site, Jamil evaded comment, saying "Alhamdulillah, we are serious in solving this issue". A similar sentiment would later be echoed in September 2016 by Harussani Zakaria, a Perak-based mufti, who declared that the construction of the monument had been a "big sin" and "idolatrous", because building monuments in the shape of humans was haram in Islam.

== Design ==
Commissioned in 1963 and constructed in 1966, the sculpture that stands as a centrepiece of the monument is 15 meters (49.21 feet) tall, made of bronze and was designed by Austrian sculptor Felix de Weldon, who was also responsible for the Marine Corps War Memorial in Virginia, United States.

The sculpture depicts seven figures, five of which (1. holding the Malaysian flag, 2. armed with a rifle and bayonet (left), 3. armed with a machine gun (right), 4. soldiers tending to fifth wounded compatriot) represent the victorious allied forces, while the other two that lie on the ground represent the defeated communist forces.

Overall the monument depicts the victory of the forces of democracy, peace and freedom over that of communism. The sculpture was then cast at a foundry in Rome at a cost of RM600,000.

Each of the bronze figures symbolises leadership, suffering, unity, vigilance, strength, courage and sacrifice. The stones that the soldiers are standing on were imported from the small coastal city of Karlshamn in south-eastern Sweden.

The granite base of the sculpture bears the Malayan coat of arms, flanked on either side by inscriptions in English and also in Malay both in Latin script and Jawi script:

Dedicated to the heroic fighters in the cause of peace and freedom, May the blessing of Allah be upon them

== Jalan Tugu ==
Jalan Tugu, originally known as Cenotaph Road, refers to a road which was laid out following the completion of the cenotaph and adjoins the original cenotaph roundabout. The road was renamed to a direct Malay translation of the English name following a street renaming campaign during the 1960s, and continues to carry this name, as of 2013. The road runs parallel to the Kuala Lumpur Railway Station, and is located opposite the Railway Administration Building and National Mosque.
