= List of tourist attractions in Putrajaya =

Tourist attractions in Putrajaya, Malaysia

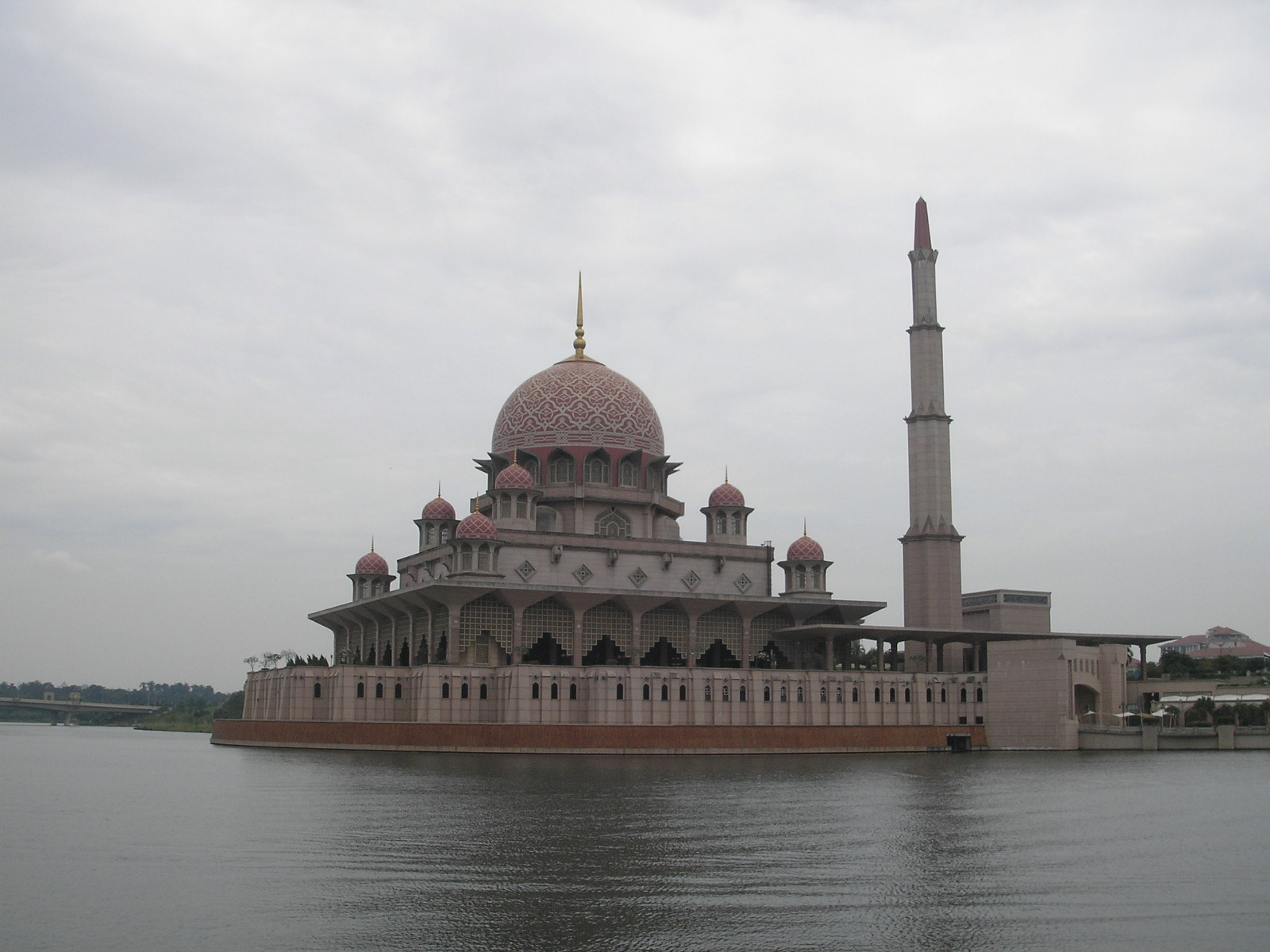
Putra Mosque

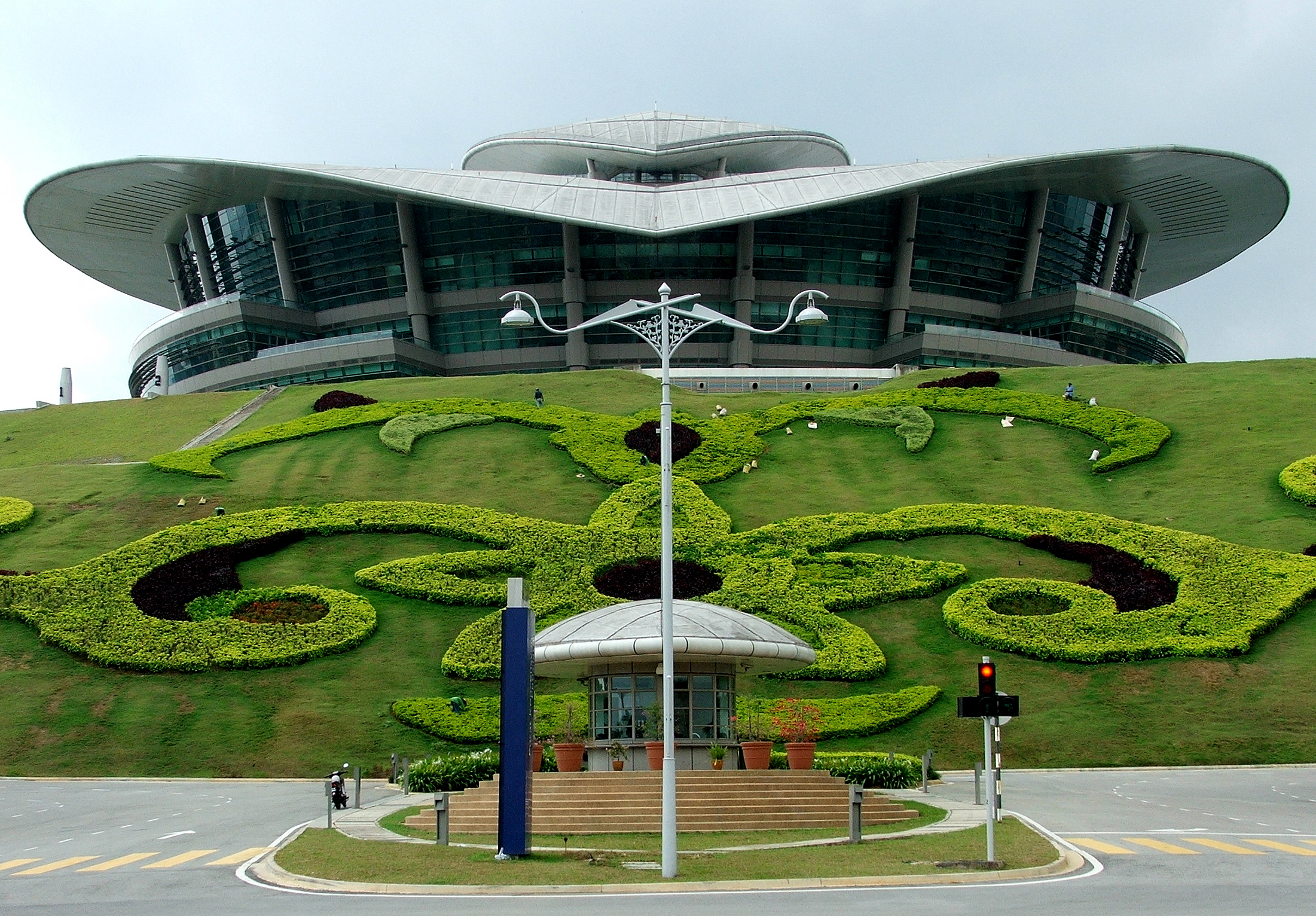
Putrajaya International Convention Centre

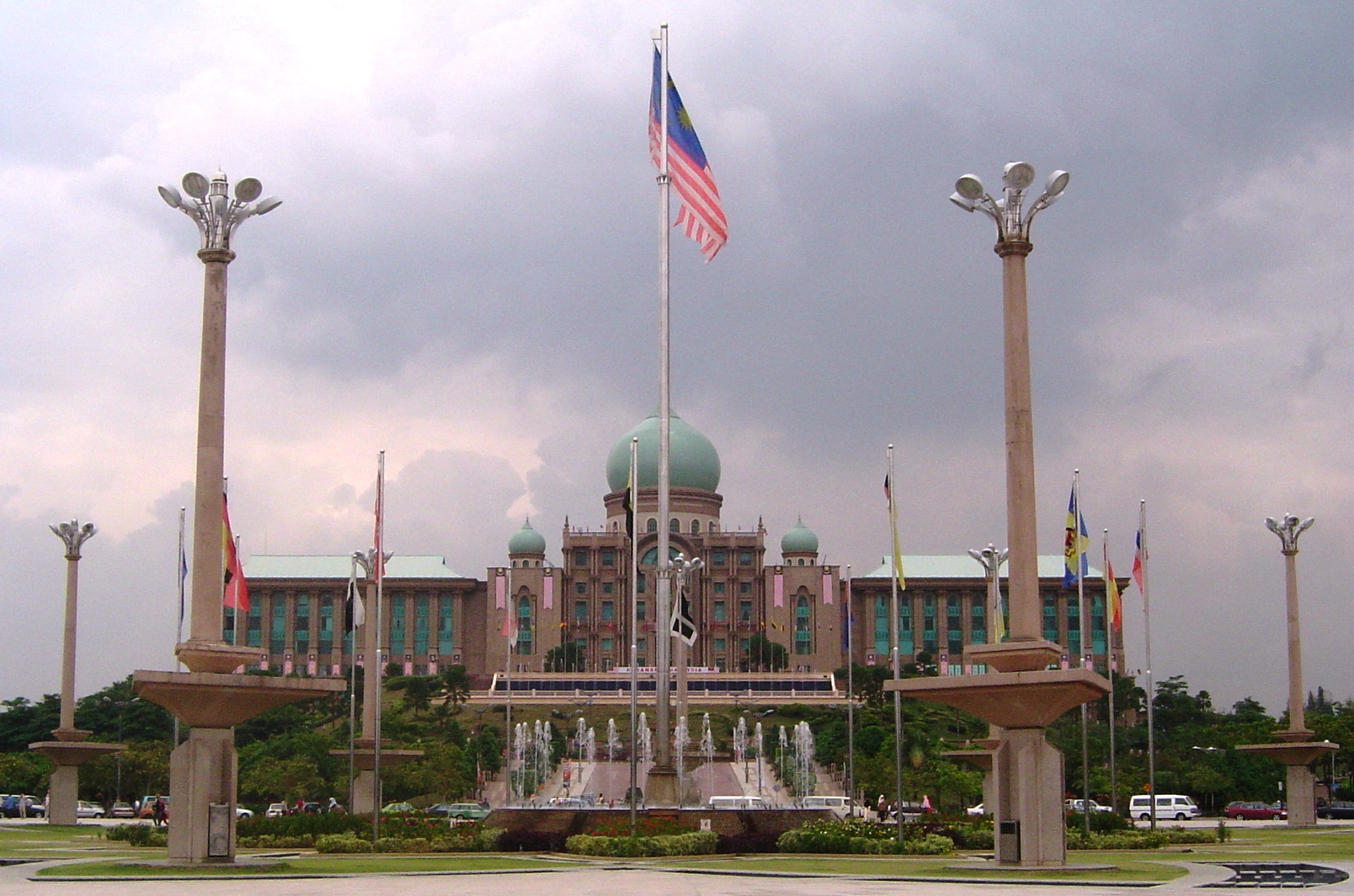
Putra Square

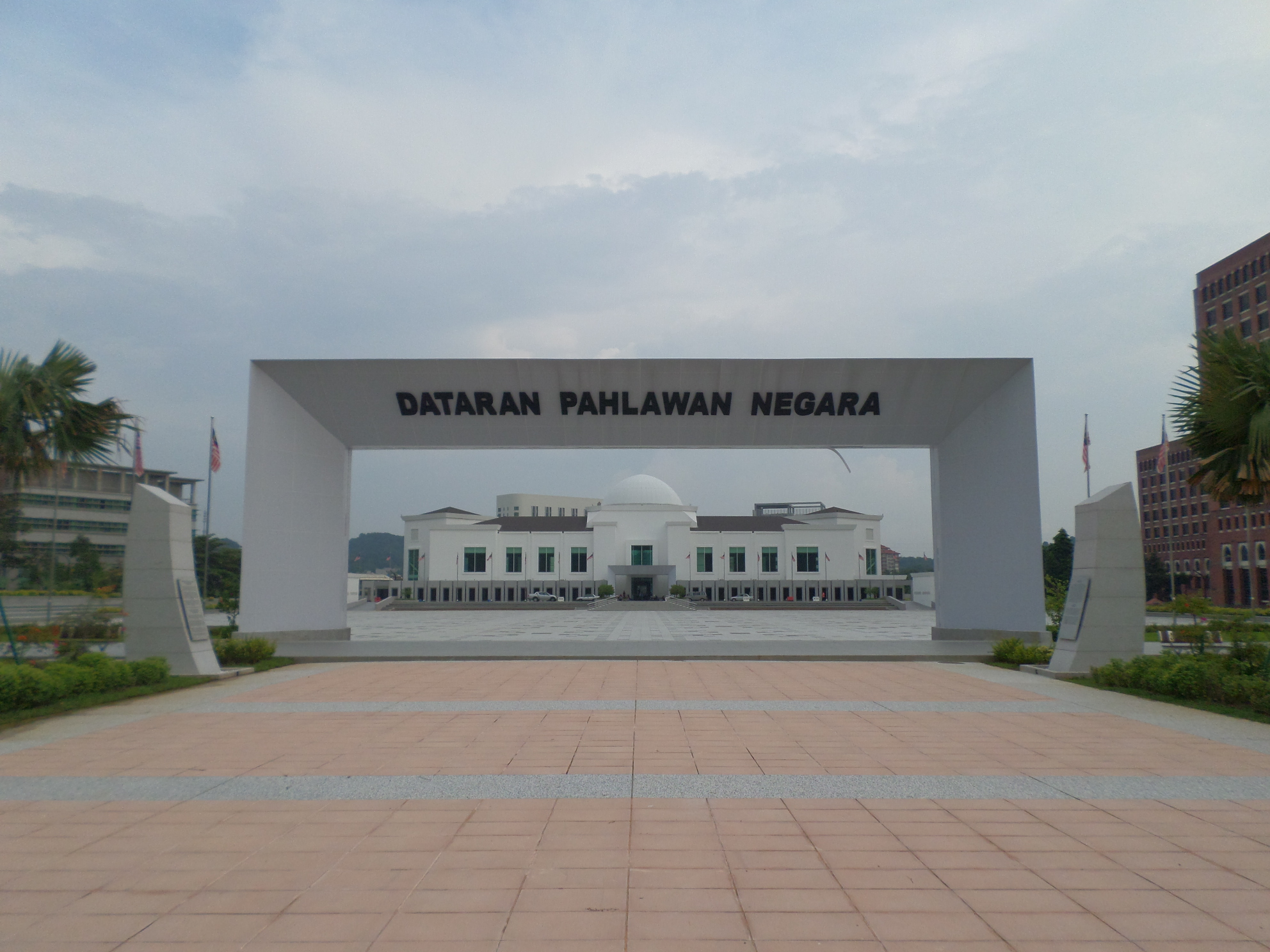
National Heroes Square

This is the list of tourist attractions in Putrajaya, Malaysia. Putrajaya, Malaysia's administrative capital, was envisioned by Prime Minister Mahathir Mohamad as a modern city integrating governance, sustainability, and Islamic architecture.

== Convention centers ==
- Putrajaya International Convention Centre

== Memorials ==
- Millennium Monument
- National Heroes Square
- Putrajaya Landmark

== Nature ==
- Putrajaya Botanical Garden
- Putrajaya Lake
- Putrajaya Wetlands Park

== Public squares ==
- Putra Square

== Religious places ==
=== Mosques ===
- Putra Mosque
- Tuanku Mizan Zainal Abidin Mosque

== See also ==
- List of tourist attractions in Malaysia
