= National Heroes Square (Malaysia) =

National war memorial and monument in Putrajaya, Malaysia

Coordinates: 41.9961°N 21.4317°E

National Heroes Square Dataran Pahlawan Negara
- Malaysia
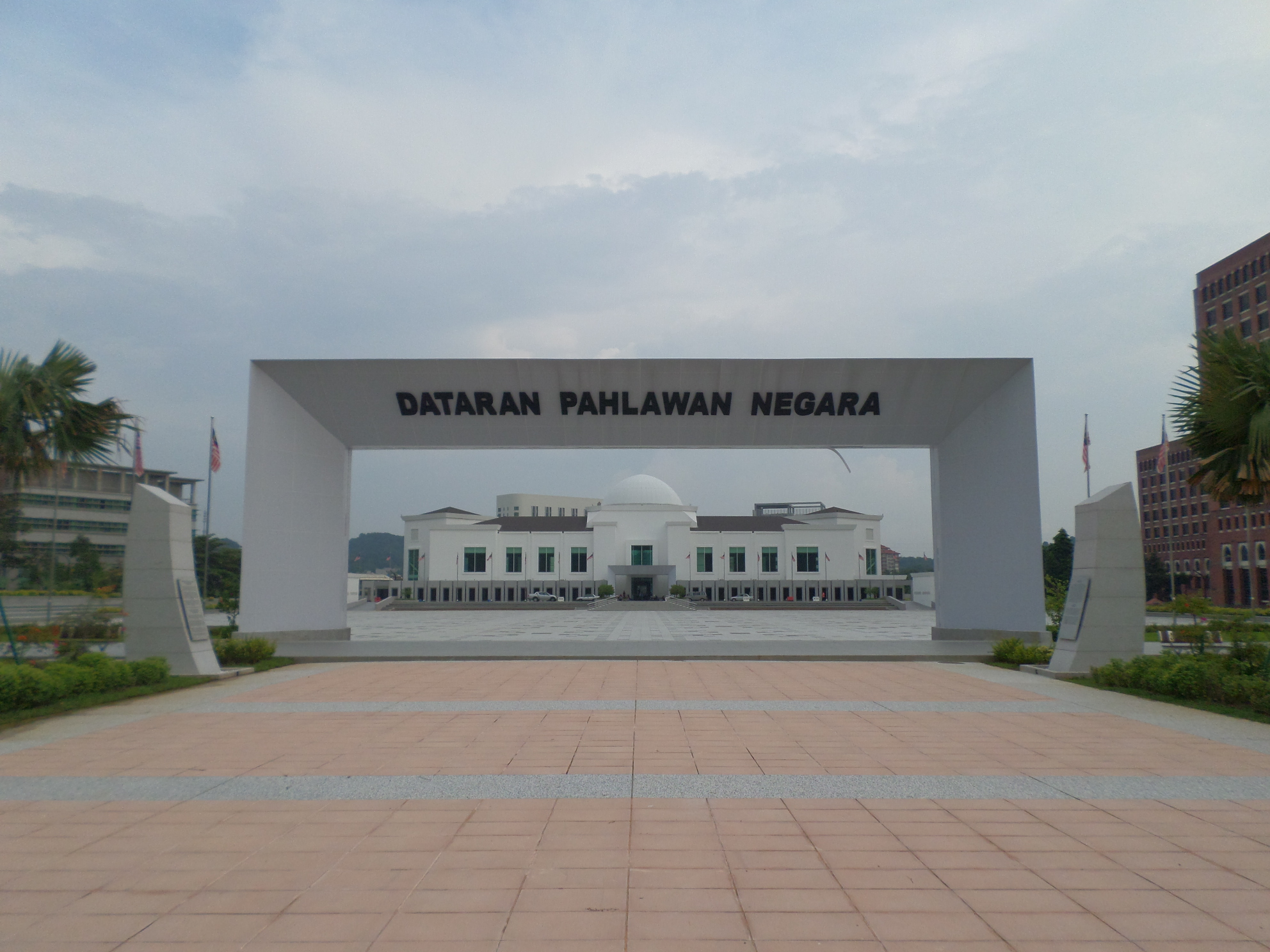
- For Malaysian military dead at all wars
- Unveiled: 2016
- Location: Putrajaya, Malaysia
- Designed by: Malaysian Public Works Department (JKR)

The National Heroes Square (Malay: Dataran Pahlawan Negara) is a monument and war memorial in Putrajaya, Malaysia. The memorial is located at Precinct 1 to replace the Tugu Negara as a venue for Hari Pahlawan.

== History ==
Completed on 2016, it is the location of the celebration of Heroes Day every year in Malaysia in accordance with the ruling of the National Fatwa Council in 1998 and the latest in April 2009. Also, the new square held its first ever Trooping the Colour the same year.

== Features ==
- Main Square
- Malaysian War Memorial Pavilion (Pavilion Memorial Peringatan Perang)
- Malaysian Armed Forces and Police Museum (Muzium Angkatan Tentera Malaysia dan Polis Diraja Malaysia)

== See also ==
- List of tourist attractions in Putrajaya
