= Putrajaya Wetlands Park =

Wetland park in Putrajaya, Malaysia

Coordinates: 2.9635972°N 101.6946726°E

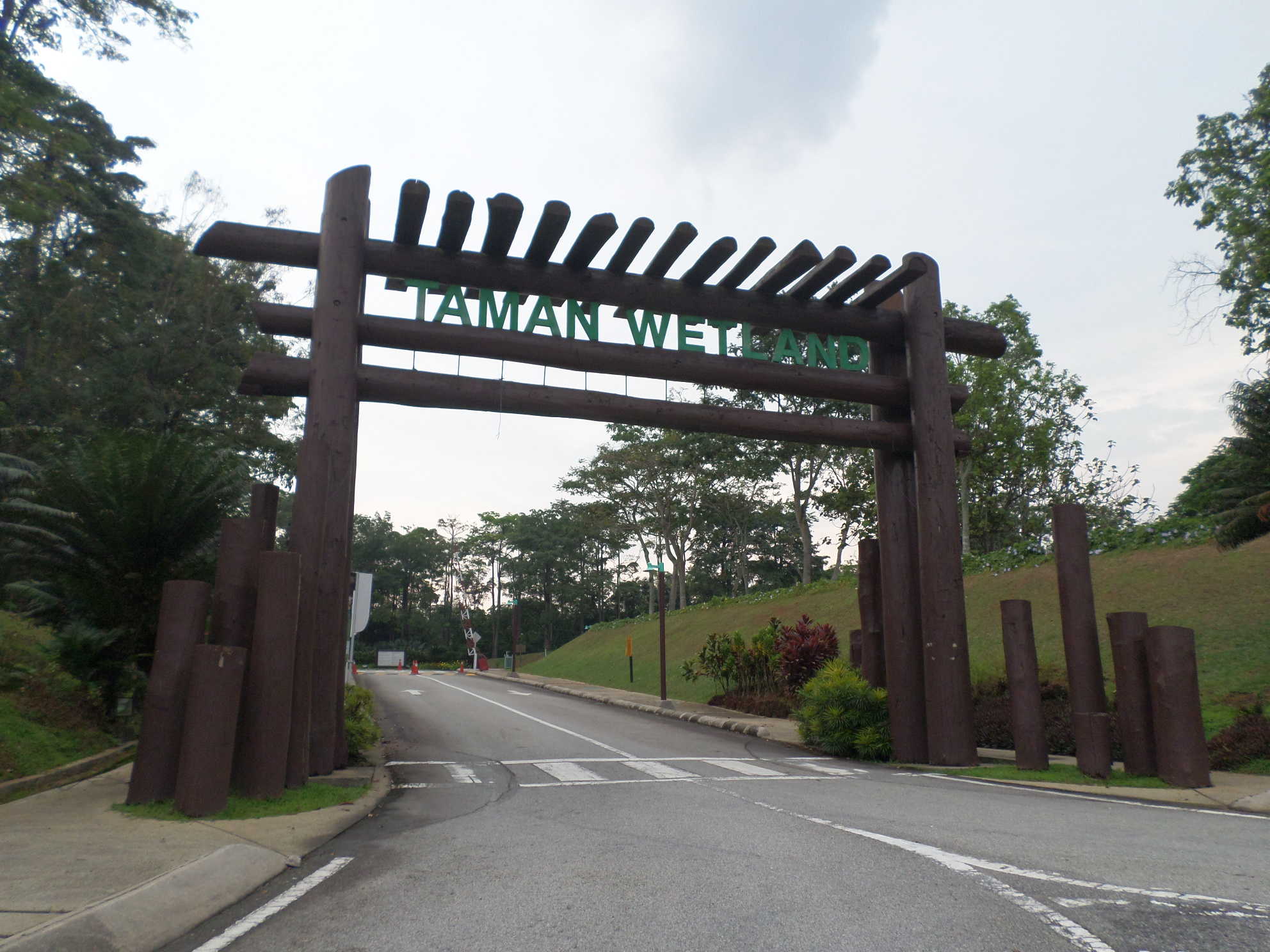
Putrajaya Wetlands Park

Putrajaya Wetlands Park (Malay: Taman Wetland) in Putrajaya, Malaysia is the largest constructed freshwater wetlands in the tropics. It is the first man-made wetland in Malaysia, which includes a Wetland Park (138 hectares) and the wetland areas (1977 hectares).

Putrajaya Wetlands consists of 24 wetland cells, Wetlands Park (Taman Wetland) and the other Wetlands areas. The Wetland now is also a wildlife sanctuary which attracts a huge variety of animals to the combined terrestrial-aquatic wetland environment.

Several species of local marshland birds and water birds including the little egret, the little green heron and cinnamon bittern, and migratory birds form Northern Hemisphere have been spotted there. Binoculars will come in handy for bird watching. The visitors can also enjoy a leisurely walk, jog or cycle along its bicycle track.

== See also ==
- List of tourist attractions in Putrajaya
