= Bukit Cherakah =

Mountain in Malaysia

Highest point
- Elevation: 213 m (699 ft)
- Coordinates: 3.2341474653664597°N 101.39991977608283°E

Geography
- Location: Selangor, Malaysia

Bukit Cherakah (Malay: Bukit Cerakah) is a hill in Kuala Selangor District, Selangor, Malaysia with the height of 213 metres (699 ft). It is one of three prominent peaks along the coast of Selangor. Bukit Cherakah gives its name to a forest reserve which includes the Shah Alam Community Forest and the National Botanical Garden Shah Alam. The Bukit Cherakah forest reserve is home to a group of Temuan people of the village Kampung Ayer Kuning.

There are several hiking routes to the peak.

== See also ==
- List of mountains in Malaysia
