= Shah Alam Community Forest =

Recreational site in Selangor, Malaysia

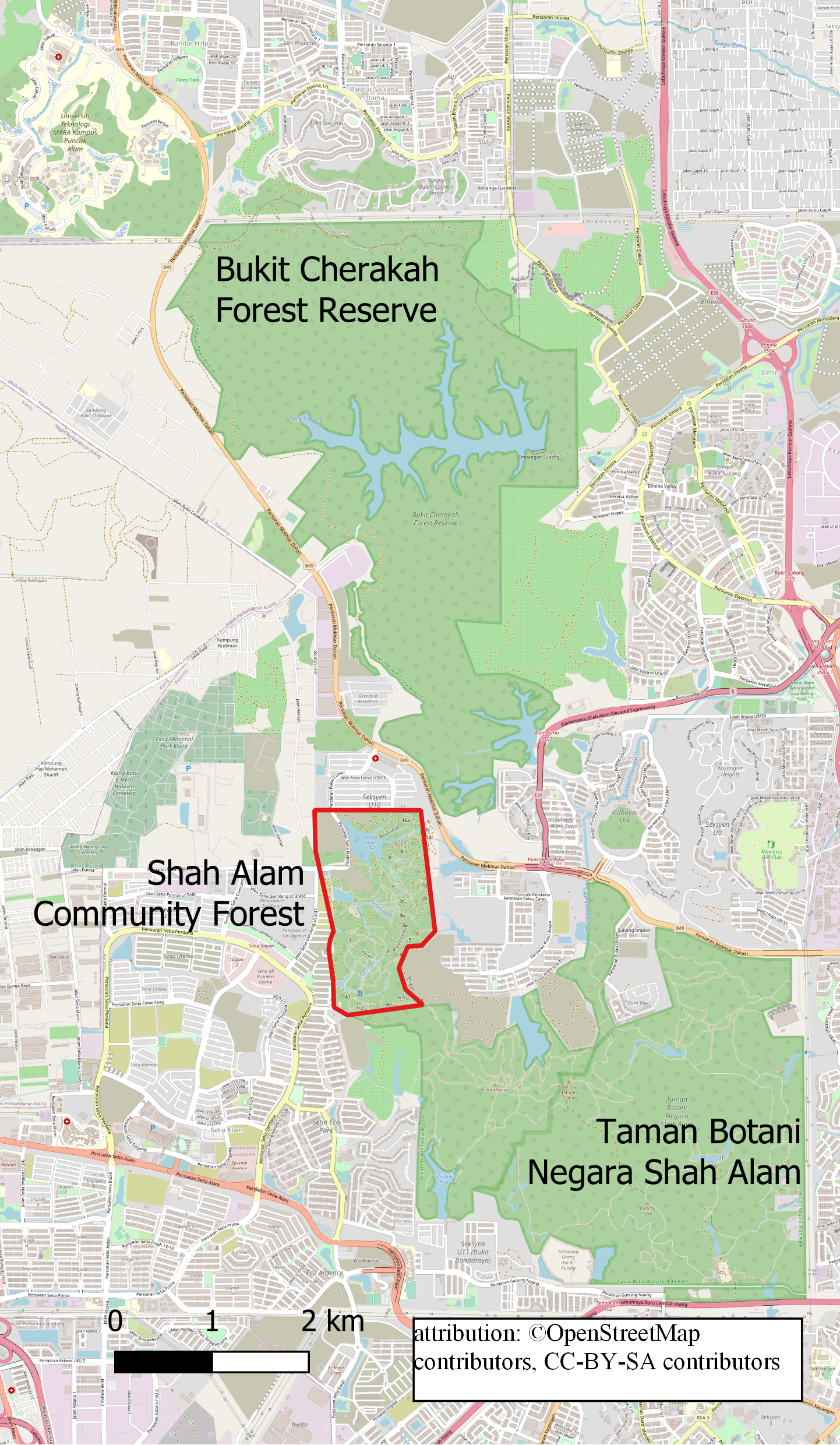
- Interactive map of Shah Alam Community Forest

Geography
- Location: Setia Alam (Sect U13), Alam Budiman (Sect U10) and NusaRhu (Sect U10) in Shah Alam
- Coordinates: 3°07′29″N 101°28′47″E
- Area: 430 acres (170 ha)

Ecology
- Ecosystem: Lowland rainforest
- Disturbance: Commercial development

Shah Alam Community Forest (SACF), also known as Setia Alam Community Trail, is a recreational site in Section U10, Shah Alam in Selangor, Malaysia spanning over 430 acres (170 ha). Located between north of Shah Alam National Botanical Gardens and south of Bukit Cherakah Forest Reserve, it serves as a wildlife corridor to link these two forest fragments, for endangered wildlife such as Malayan tapir.

The legal status of SACF is under dispute. As of 2024, 130 acres (53 ha) of SACF is claimed by the State Government and the remaining 300 acres (120 ha) are claimed by Selangor State Development Corporation (PKNS). In March 2016, the SACF Society was established, primarily aim to preserve and push for regazettement of the forest from threats of commercial development.

== History ==
SACF is part of the traditional territory of the Temuan people, the local group of Orang Asli. These people still live in the southern part of the Bukit Cherakah Forest Reserve in the village of Kampung Ayer Kuning, Bukit Bandaraya, Shah Alam.

In 1909, the area was constituted as part of the Bukit Cherakah Forest Reserve. Over the past 91 years, parts of this forest reserve have been excised (removed) for commercial, housing, road works, and educational institution purposes. Some of these developments include Alam Budiman, Bandar Puncak Alam, and Universiti Teknologi Mara's (UiTM) Selangor branch.

The most recent excision of the forest reserve was announced on May 20, 2022. The government stated that the decision was made retrospective 22 years to have its effect starting from November 20, 2000. In 2024, the Federal Court of Malaysia granted the SACF Society leave to review this decision.

== Flora and fauna ==
The Shah Alam Community Forest consists of both primary and secondary lowland rainforest. Being part of the Bukit Cherakah Forest Reserve, the forest still has populations of Malayan tapir, White-handed gibbon, and Leopard cat, which are totally protected under Malaysia Wildlife Conservation Act 2010, and protected species such as the Malayan Porcupine. There are also many species of snakes, lizards, civet cats, monkeys exist in this area, showcasing a rare and remarkable biodiversity within urban settings.

== Activities and attractions ==
=== Hiking / trail running / jungle trekking ===
Hikers and trail runners are daily visitors of SACF. The number of hikers increased during the Malaysia Movement Control Order (MCO) in 2021. The hill is the most accessible open-space getaway and workout opportunity for residents of the townships of Setia Alam and Alam Budiman. However, the trails can be slippery when wet and it is not advised to visit following a downpour.

The main trail consists of a 6.9-km loop that is fairly challenging and can take around 3 hours to complete. The trail has an elevation gain of around 600 feet and is rated as "hard".

=== Downhill cycling ===
SACF has become a popular spot among cyclists for its steep drops. At least 5 loops of forest trails have been made by volunteer cycling groups, including members of the Shah Alam Community Forest Society (SACFS).

== Funding and Management ==
In 2019, the Shah Alam Community Forest Society received funding for a project from the Global Environment Facility/Small Grants Programme (GEF/SGP). This funding was made possible through the collaboration of the United Nations Development Programme (UNDP) on behalf of three GEF Implementing Agencies: UNDP, United Nations Environment Programme (UNEP), and the World Bank. The project was executed by the United Nations Office for Project Services (UNOPS) and the management of Shah Alam Community Forest is entirely handled by volunteers of SACF society.

== Development plans ==
Numerous proposals and ongoing developments are underway in SACF, encompassing designated zones for housing, a road, and a cemetery. Menteri Besar of Selangor, Amirudin Shari, said that part of the forest has been allocated to the state-agency Selangor State Development Corporation. NGOs such as SACFS and Pertubuhan Pelindung Khazanah Alam (PEKA) have challenged these plans, as there were already at least 12 roadkill incidents of tapirs while attempting to cross the B49 highway, also known as Persiaran Mokhtar Dahari, which was constructed in 2003.
