= Millennium Monument (Malaysia) =

Monument in Putrajaya, Malaysia

- Monumen Alaf Baru
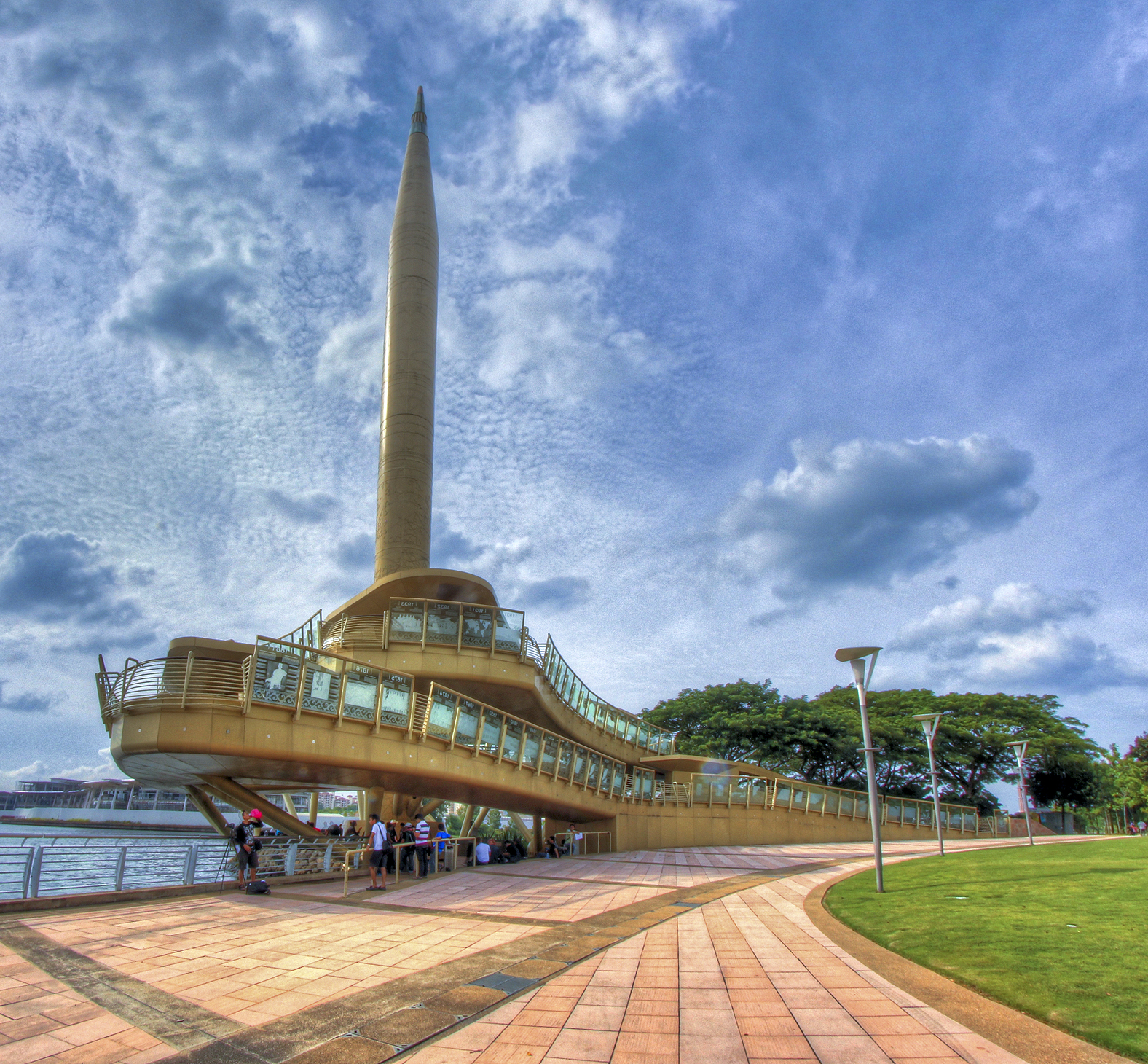
- Interactive map of the Millennium Monument area

General information
- Type: Monument
- Location: Putrajaya, Malaysia
- Coordinates: 2.9234°N 101.6825°E
- Completed: 2001
- Owner: Putrajaya Corporation

Height
- Architectural: Modernism

Design and construction
- Architecture firm: T.R. Hamzah & Yeang Sdn. Bhd.

Millennium Monument (Malay: Monumen Alaf Baru) is a national monument in Putrajaya, Malaysia which is analogous to the Washington Monument in Washington DC, United States. It was the second national monument to be built in Putrajaya after Putrajaya Landmark. It is shaped like an obelisk with etchings denoting important periods and milestones in the nation's history. The monument is 68m tall. It stands in a 25-hectare park in Precinct 2. The monument is constructed of solid metal structures. At night, the monument serves as a beacon with strong light projected at 360 degrees and sweeping lights visible from various locations in Putrajaya. The lights also guide the cruise boats.

== See also ==
- List of tourist attractions in Putrajaya
