= Putrajaya Botanical Garden =

Botanical garden in Putrajaya, Malaysia

- Taman Botani Putrajaya
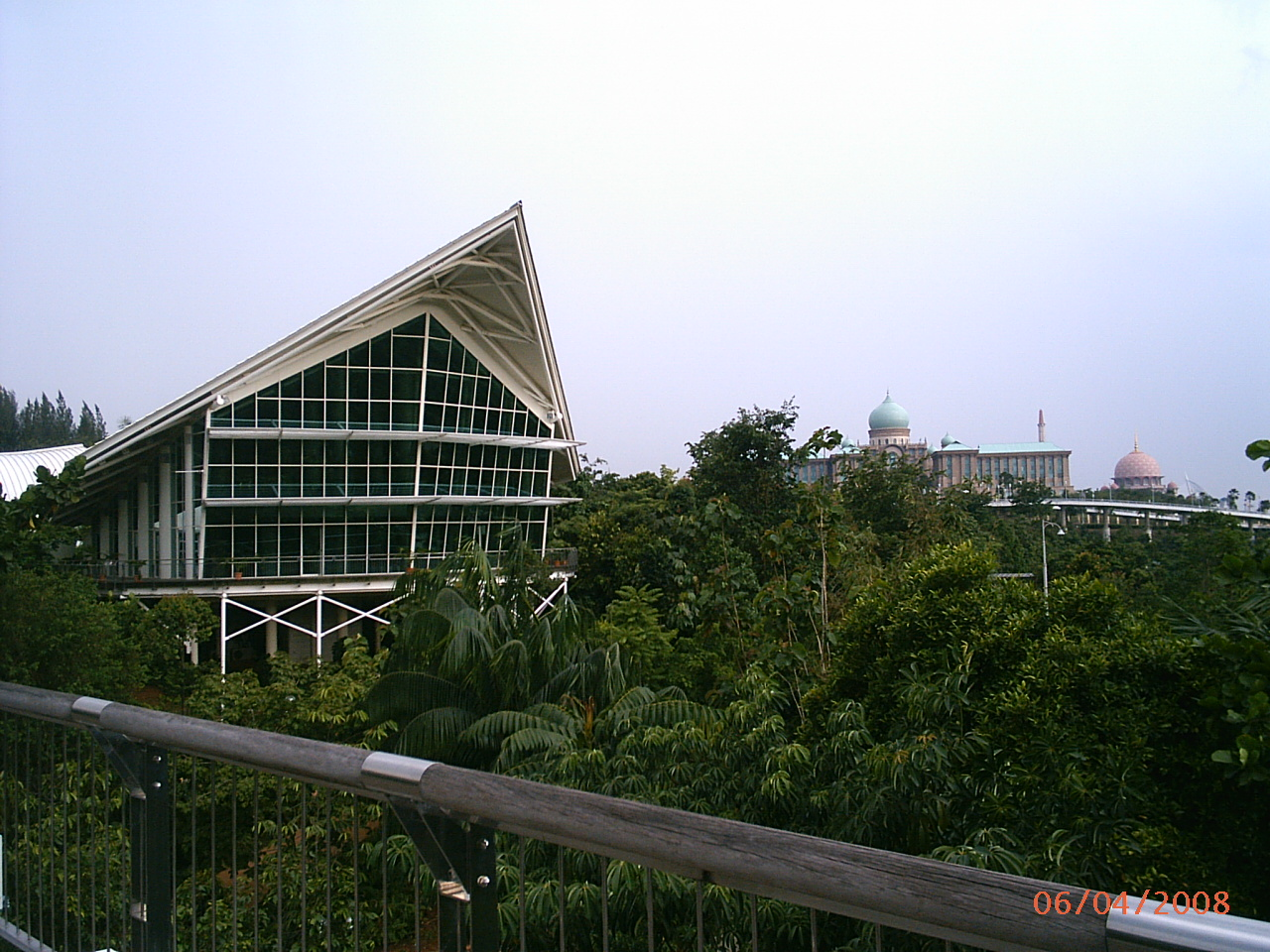
- Interactive map of Putrajaya Botanical Garden
- Type: botanical garden
- Location: Presint 1, Putrajaya, Malaysia
- Coordinates: 2°56′51.0″N 101°41′47.3″E
- Opening: 31 August 2001
- Parking: Yes

Putrajaya Botanical Garden (Malay: Taman Botani Putrajaya) is a botanical garden in Presint 1, Putrajaya, Malaysia. It was opened on 31 August 2001 and spans over an area of 93 hectares. The garden is divided into five sections, which are Explorer's Trail, Palm Hill, Floral Gardens, Sun Garden and Lakeside. It features facilities such as restaurant, car parks, bicycle rental and paddle boat rental. The garden is accessible by bus from Putrajaya/Cyberjaya ERL station.

== Gallery ==
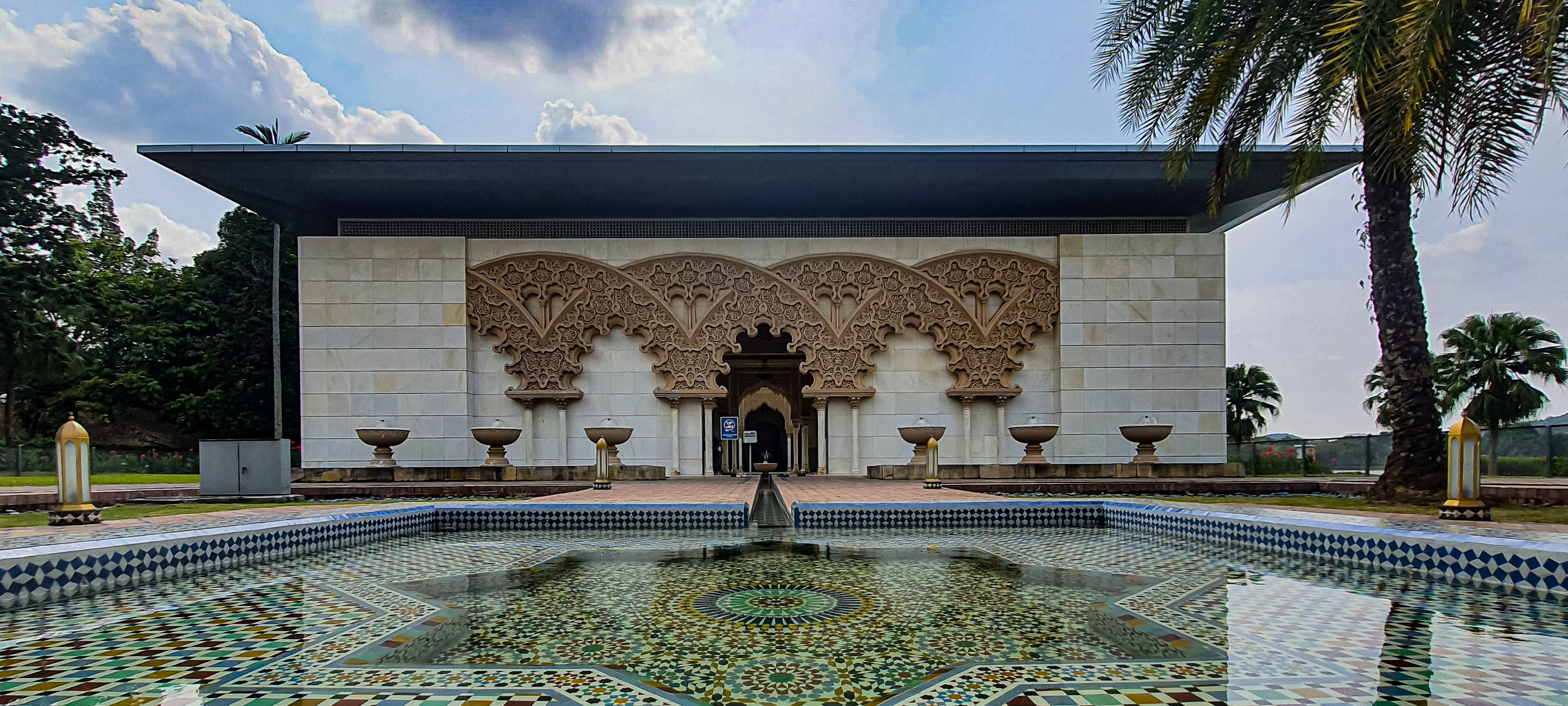
The front facade and entry of the Moroccan Pavilion in Putrajaya Botanical Gardens.

== See also ==
- List of tourist attractions in Putrajaya
