= Putrajaya Landmark =

Landmark in Putrajaya, Malaysia

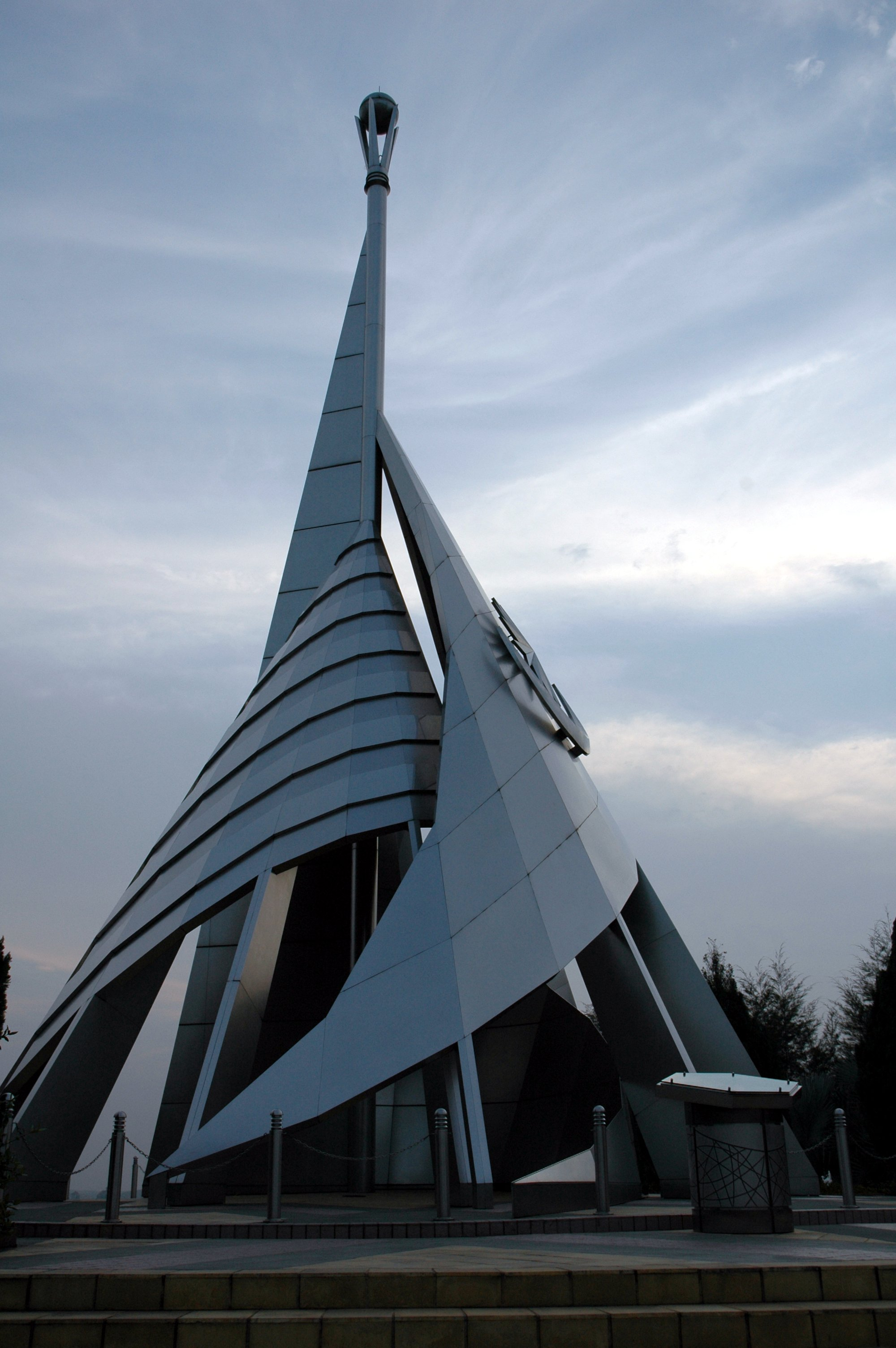
- Putrajaya Landmark
- 2°56′27.24″N 101°41′51″E
- Location: Putrajaya, Malaysia

The Putrajaya Landmark or Mercu Tanda Putrajaya is the first landmark in Putrajaya where the site of federal administrative centre was established here in 1995. It is located in Putra Perdana Park (which happens to be the highest point in Precinct 1 of Putrajaya, Malaysia). The Putrajaya Landmark symbolises the beginnings of Putrajaya with its time capsule structure. Its design is a combination of a high-technology theme and the use of contemporary and traditional motifs. Plaza Mercu or Landmark Plaza, is landscaped with trees and water fountains. The Perdana Mall are pedestrian walkways linking the Landmark and Entrance Plaza to Cascade Plaza, Fragrant Garden, gazebos and pergolas.

== See also ==
- List of tourist attractions in Putrajaya
