= National Botanical Garden Shah Alam =

Botanic gardens in Selangor, Malaysia

National Botanic Gardens Shah Alam
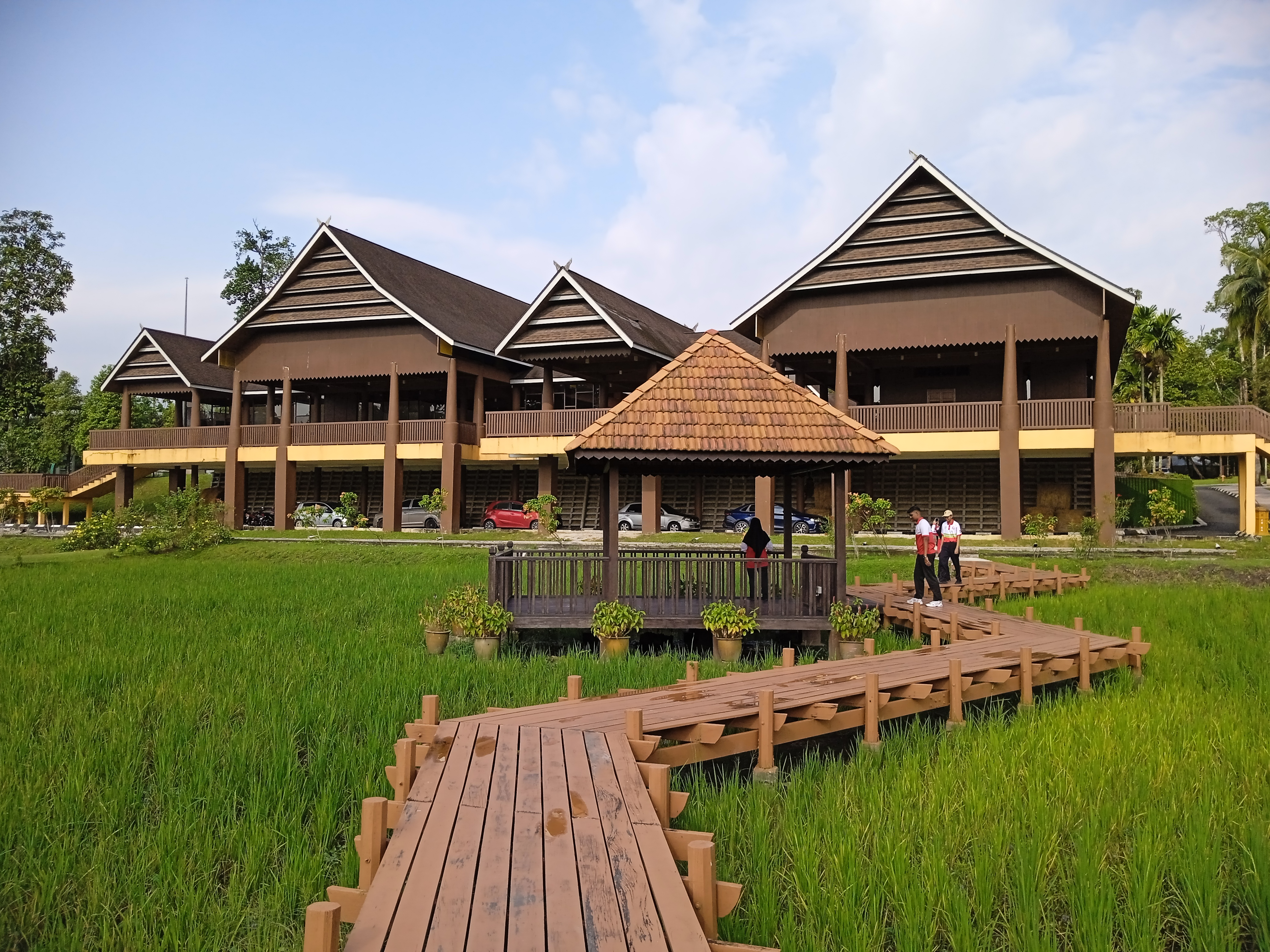
- Paddy fields at National Botanical Garden Shah Alam

- Location within Peninsular Malaysia
- Type: National botanic gardens
- Location: Shah Alam, Selangor
- Coordinates: 3.0961469°N 101.5110537°E
- Area: 817 hectares (2,020 acres)
- Created: 24 April 1986; 40 years ago
- Visitors: 383,329 (2016)
- Open: Every Tuesday to Sunday
- Parking: 500
- Website: www.tbnsa.gov.my

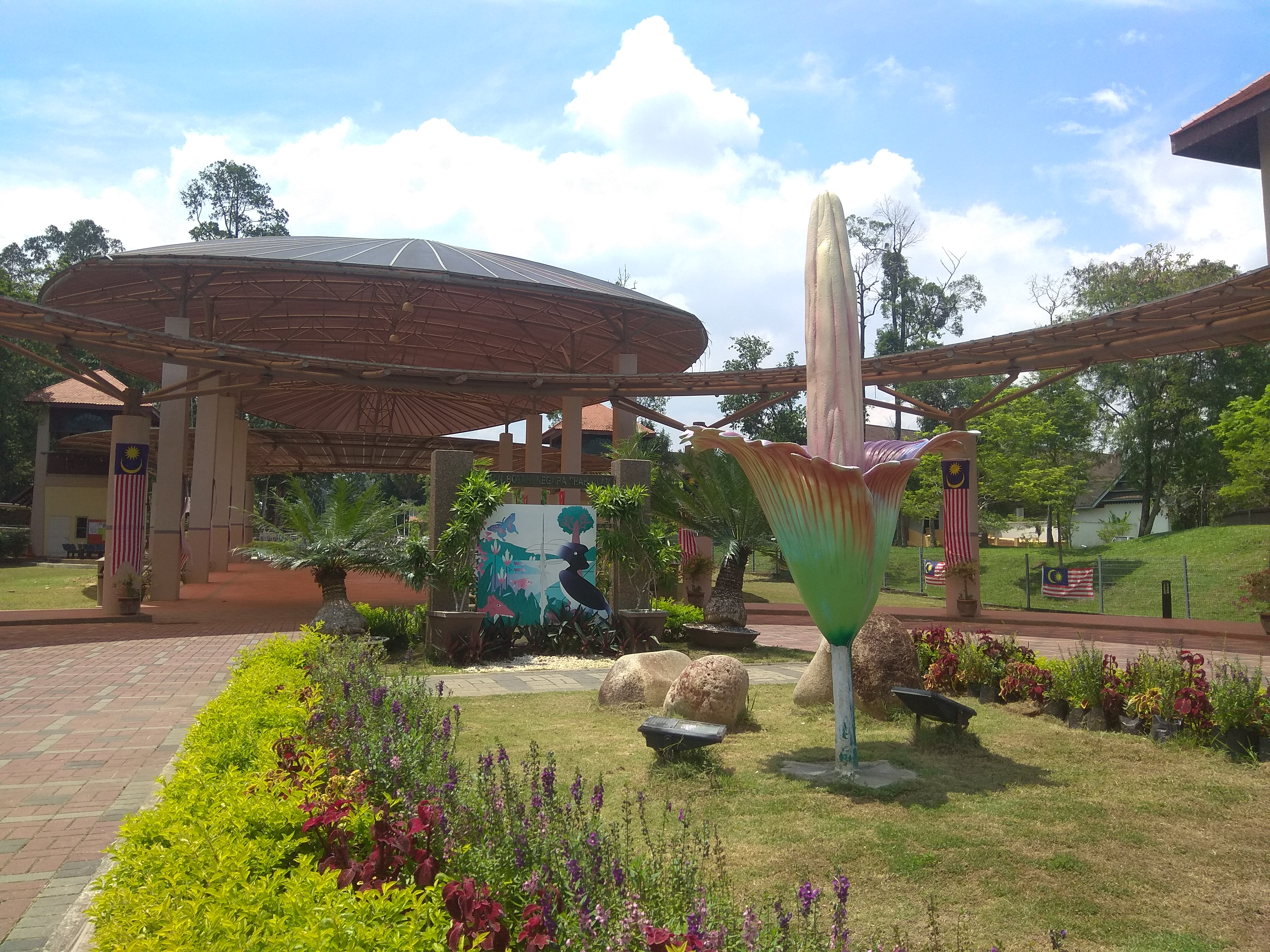
Sculpture of titan arum at entrance

National Botanic Gardens Shah Alam (Malay: Taman Botani Negara Shah Alam or TBNSA) is a national botanic garden in Shah Alam, Selangor, Malaysia. It is incorporated in the Ministry of Agriculture and Food Industries. With area of 817 hectares, it is the habitat of flora and fauna, also a recreational destination in the Klang Valley. As of August 2021, the director of TBNSA is Siti Zubaidah binti Mohamad.

== History ==
National Botanic Gardens Shah Alam (TBNSA) was constructed on 24 April 1986, known as Taman Pertanian Bukit Cerakah (the Bukit Cherakah Agricultural Park). It is located in the Bukit Cherakah Forest Reserve that was constituted in 1909. In 1991, the name was changed to Taman Pertanian Malaysia Bukit Cahaya Seri Alam. In 2007, TBNSA has finally got its current name, Taman Botani Negara Shah Alam. The garden was established on the forest reserve area of Bukit Cerakah which served as a reservoir for the water for the people of Shah Alam.

The forest is a red meranti-keruing forest, consist of various Dipterocarpaceae such as Seraya and Meranti. There are also a few hills that can be hiked along the paved trail. The highest point is the Bukit Sapu Tangan (200m asl), on top of the hill, there's a lookout point that provide the view of the city of Shah Alam. The trails from the hill connect with adjacent forested areas outside TBNSA, including Shah Alam Community Forest.

== Vision & Mission ==
TBNSA is developed to provide a national scientific education centre and also act as a natural resource conservation centre for the development of botanical, horticultural, floricultural, agriculture and other related field in Malaysia. TBNSA also functions as a community awareness centre that aims to create excitement and induce the community to appreciate the beauty and benefit of our own local plants variety which is also our national heritage.

== Objectives & Functions ==
- To be an integrated agricultural-based tourism centre.
- To be an informative agricultural-based tourism centre in the field of farming, aquaculture and livestock.
- To be an agricultural-based tourism centre that could also be a centre for scientific researches and studies in the environmental and agricultural field.
- To be an agricultural-based tourism centre with learning and recreation facility based on Malaysian cultural characteristics.
- To be an agricultural-based tourism centre that stresses on the environmental sustainability as well flora and fauna.

== Attractions ==
=== Park & Garden ===
- Animal Park
- Ornamental Garden
- 4 Seasons Temperate House (RISEM)
- Spice & Beverages Garden
- Cactus Garden
- Tropical Fruits Garden
- Paddy Field
- Herbs & Medicinal Garden

=== Dams & Lakes ===
- Sungai Baru Dam
- Air Kuning Dam
- Mystery Tunnel
- Pool C

=== Village & Chalet ===
- Kampung Idaman
  - Rumah Perlis
  - Rumah Kedah
  - Rumah Pulau Pinang
  - Rumah Perak
  - Rumah Negeri Sembilan
  - Rumah Melaka
  - Rumah Johor
  - Rumah Pahang
  - Rumah Terengganu
  - Rumah Kelantan
- Perkampungan Budaya
- Camar Rimba

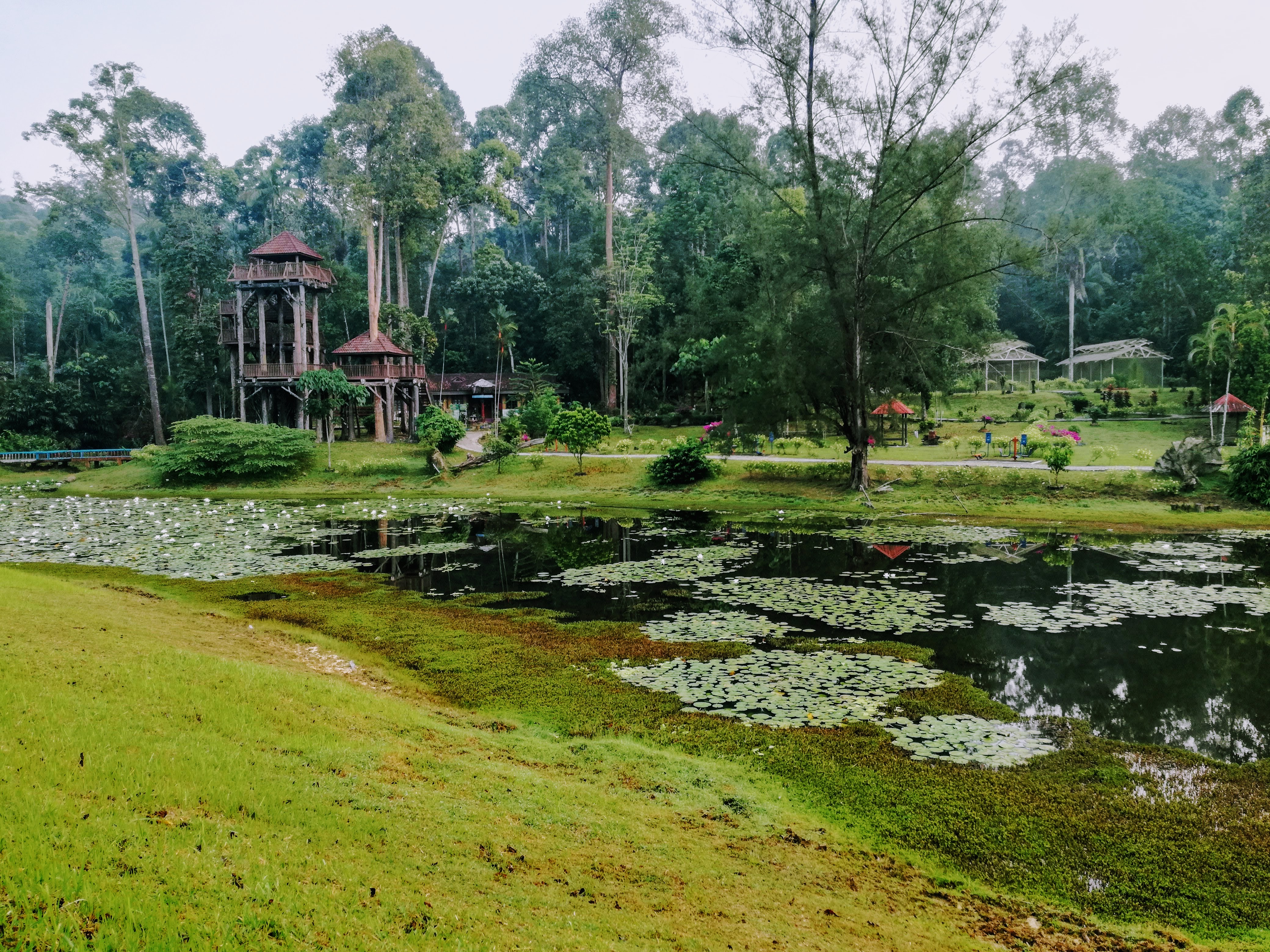
The viewing tower

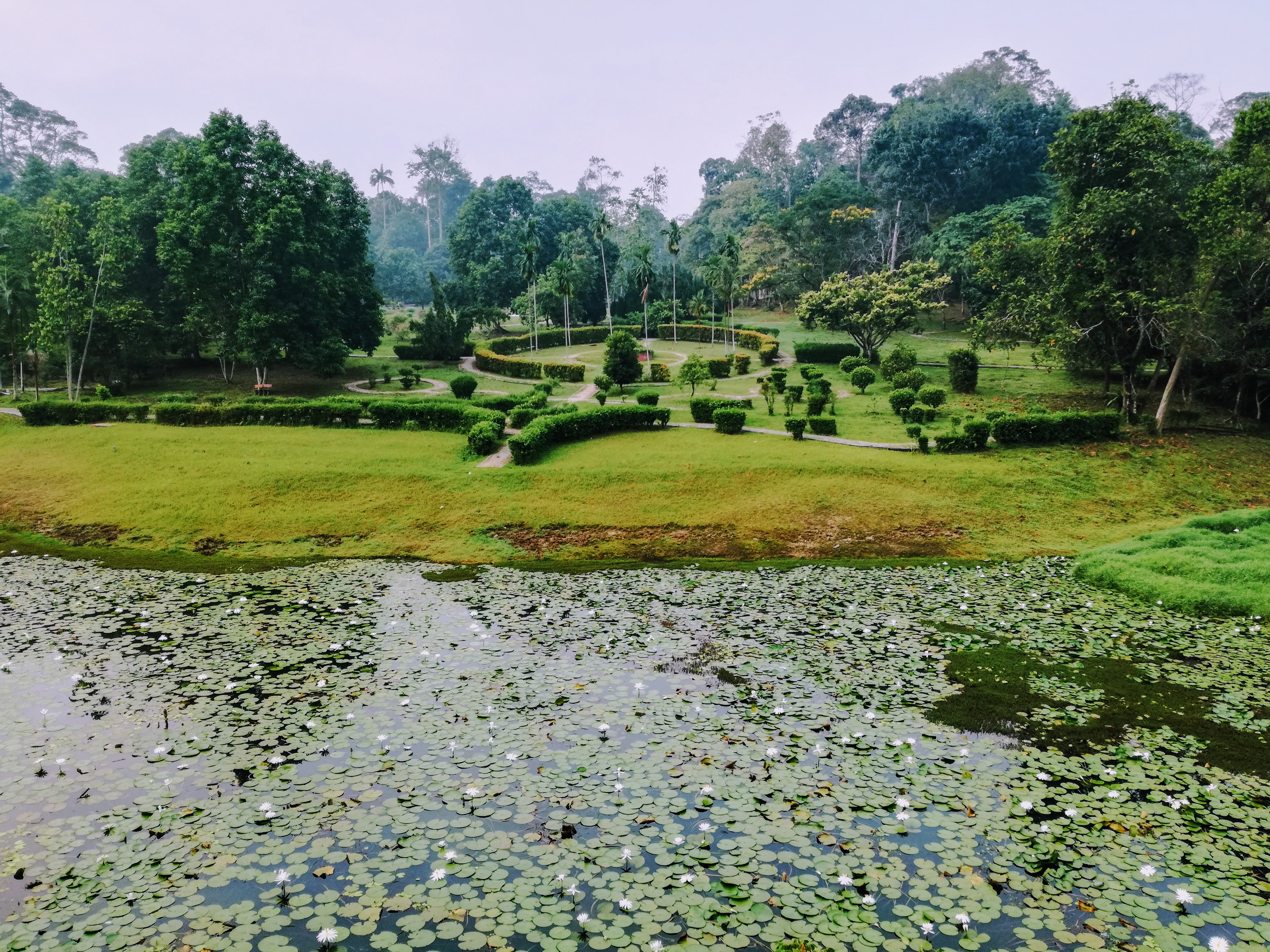
The Ornamental Garden

== Operating hours ==
=== Park operating hours ===
Unit	Tuesday - Sunday	Monday
Park and gardens	7.30 am to 5.00 pm	* Park is closed on Mondays except during school holidays or public holidays
Four Seasons Temperate House (RISEM) * Temporarily closed	7.30 am to 4.30 pm	* Park is closed on Mondays except during school holidays or public holidays
Ticketing counter & payment counter	7.30 am to 4.30 pm	* Park is closed on Mondays except during school holidays or public holidays
Bus	Tuesday to Sunday: 7.30 am to 4.30 pm; Friday: 7.30 am to 12.15 pm; 2.45 pm to 4.30 pm	* Park is closed on Mondays except during school holidays or public holidays

== Entrance fee ==
=== Conservation fee (Compulsory) ===
Category of visitor	Charge per visitor
Adult (12 to 54 years old)	RM 3.00
Children (6 to 11 years old)	RM 1.00
Senior citizen (Above 55 years old)	RM 1.00
Visitors under 6 years old, Orphans and People with Disabilities	Free Admission

=== Conservation fee for Four Seasons Temperate House (RISEM) ===
Conservation fee	Other seasons	Winter season
Adult (12 years old and above)	RM 3.00	RM 5.00
Children (4 to 11 years old)	RM 1.00	RM 3.00
Visitors under 4 years old, Orphans and People with Disabilities	Free Admission	

== See also ==
- List of tourist attractions in Selangor
