= Putrajaya–Cyberjaya Expressway =

Road in Malaysia

Federal Route 29
- Putrajaya–Cyberjaya Expressway
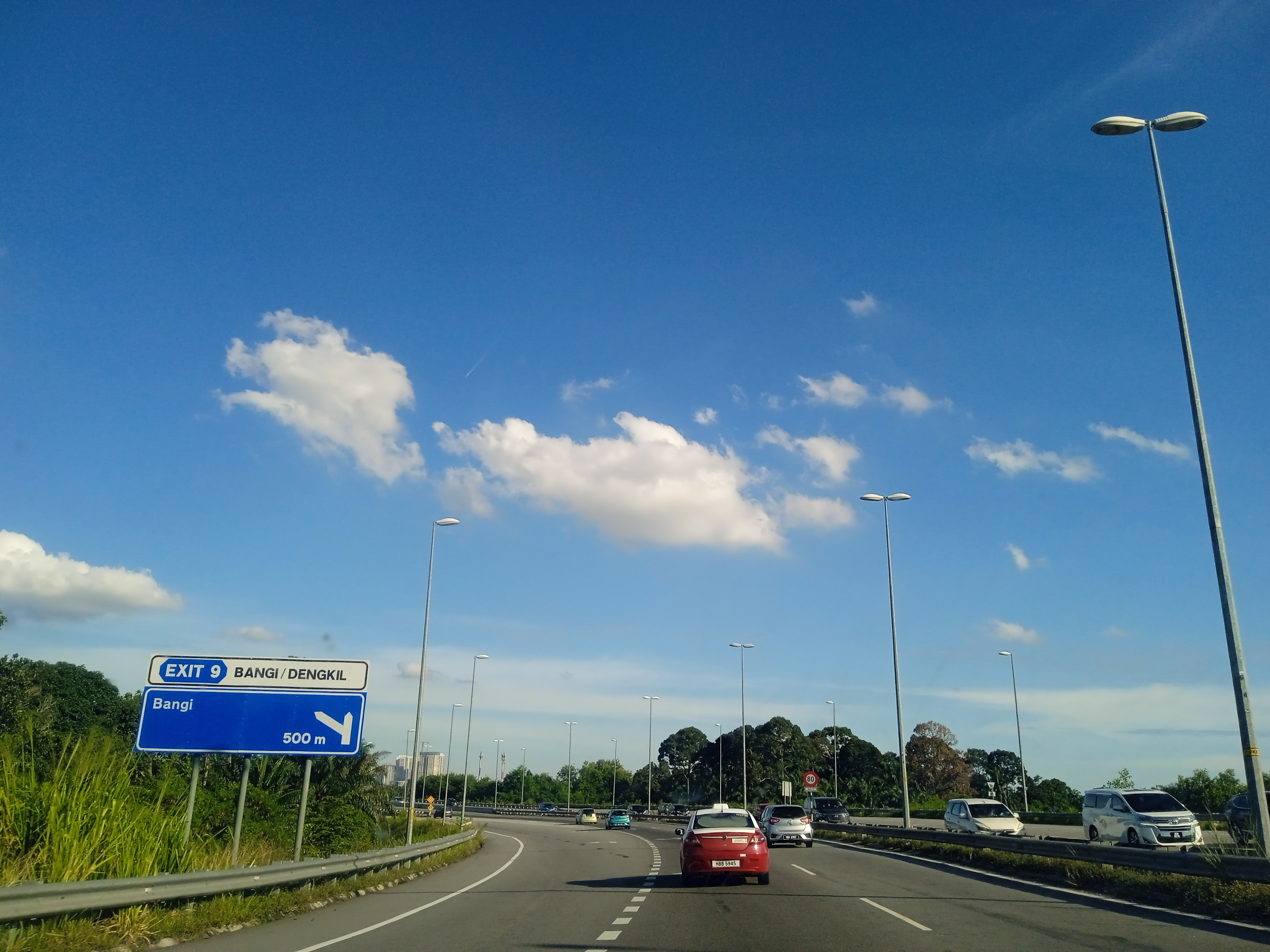

Route information
- Maintained by Malaysian Public Works Department
- Length: 21.2 km (13.2 mi)
- Existed: 1997–present
- History: Completed in 2009

Major junctions
- North end: Serdang Interchange
- Damansara–Puchong Expressway; South Klang Valley Expressway; Persiaran APEC; Persiaran Utara; Putrajaya Link; FT 30 Putrajaya Ring Road; FT 214 Federal Route 214; FT 31 Federal Route 31; FT 32 Federal Route 32; FT 27 KLIA Outer Ring Road; FT 26 KLIA Expressway
- South end: Kuala Lumpur International Airport (KLIA)

Location
- Country: Malaysia
- Primary destinations: Putrajaya, Cyberjaya, Dengkil, Kuala Lumpur International Airport (KLIA)

Highway system
- Highways in Malaysia; Expressways; Federal; State

Putrajaya–Cyberjaya Expressway, also known as Dengkil Putrajaya Bypass (Jalan Pintasan Dengkil Putrajaya), Federal Route 29, is a major expressway in Klang Valley, Malaysia. The 21.2 km (13.2 mi) expressway connects Serdang interchange on Damansara–Puchong Expressway to Kuala Lumpur International Airport (KLIA) in Sepang. It was named after the two sides of the MSC cities, Putrajaya and Cyberjaya.

== Route background ==
The kilometre marker for the expressway is a continuation from the E11 Damansara–Puchong Expressway; therefore, the Putrajaya–Cyberjaya Expressway assumes the same Kilometre Zero as the Damansara–Puchong Expressway.

== History ==
The road used to be known as the State Route B15 from Puchong to Dengkil.

Construction began in 1997 and was divided into four phases. The first phase was from the Damansara–Puchong Expressway to the Persiaran Utara interchange (completed in 1999), the second from Persiaran Utara to Dengkil (completed in 2001), the third from Dengkil to Sepang (completed in 2006) and the fourth from Sepang to Kuala Lumpur International Airport (KLIA), completed in 2009.

== Motorcycle lanes ==
There have been criticisms on the state of the expressway. Compared to other expressways, there are many hazards along certain stretches such as broken street lamps and dangerously uneven road surface. Most motorcyclists avoided using the designated lanes due to untrimmed tree branches jutting out into the lane, sand on the road, unlit tunnels and flooding.

== Features ==
- Motorcycle lane
- The first future federal highway on Multimedia Super Corridor
- Arch bridge at major interchanges along the highway
- Widest highway and interchange
- Highway with ERL railway line
- Highway between Putrajaya and Cyberjaya
- Dengkil Lake Bridge

At most sections, the Federal Route 29 was built under the JKR R5 road standard, allowing maximum speed limit of up to 90 km/h.

Driving conditions on this expressway can be hazardous, with unlit street lights, twisted guard rails and poorly maintained road surface.

== Interchange lists ==
The entire route is located in Selangor.

Legend:

- I/C - Interchange, I/S - Intersection, RSA - Rest and service area, OBR - Overhead bridge restaurant, R/R - Restaurant and rest plaza, L/B - Layby, V/P - Vista point, TN - tunnel, T/P - Toll plaza, BR - Bridge
- C - Cloverleaf, S - Stack, T-A - Trumpet-A, T-B - Trumpet-B, DT - Directional-T/Y, SDT - Semi-Directional-T/Y, P-Y - Partial-Y, D - Diamond, P-C - Partial cloverleaf, D-D - Diverging diamond, D-R - Direct ramp

District	km	Exit	Name	Destinations	No. of lane	Notes
Through to Damansara–Puchong Expressway
Petaling		1123	Serdang I/C	Persiaran Alpina – D' Alpina, 16 Sierra; FT 3215 Jalan Seri Kembangan – Bandar Putra Permai, Serdang, Seri Kembangan, University of Putra Malaysia (UPM)	Six	Diamond interchange
Petaling	0.0	–	–		Six	
Sepang		1	SKVE I/C	South Klang Valley Expressway – Pulau Indah, Banting, Klang, Bandar Saujana Putra, Serdang, Kajang, Seremban, Universiti Tenaga Nasional (Uniten), Malaysia Agro Exposition Park Serdang (MAEPS)	Six	Cloverleaf interchange
Sepang		2	Cyberjaya North I/C	Persiaran APEC – Cyberjaya, Multimedia University (MMU), Limkokwing University of Creative Technology (LUCT), Malaysian Global Innovation and Creativity Centre (MaGIC)	Six	Trumpet interchange
Sepang		3	Persiaran Utara I/C	Persiaran Utara – Putrajaya	Six	Trumpet interchange
Sepang		4	Putrajaya Sentral I/C	Jalan P7F – Putrajaya Sentral, Putrajaya-Cyberjaya ERL stations	Six	Trumpet interchange
Sepang		5	Putrajaya–Cyberjaya I/C	Putrajaya Link; North–South Expressway Central Link / AH2 – Ipoh, Shah Alam, Kuala Lumpur International Airport (KLIA), Johor Bahru; Maju Expressway – Kuala Lumpur (Jalan Tun Razak), Bukit Jalil, Seri Kembangan; Persiaran Barat – Putrajaya, Putrajaya International Convention Centre (PICC)	Six	Cloverleaf interchange
Sepang		6	Cyberjaya South I/C	Persiaran Rimba Permai – Cyberjaya, Multimedia University (MMU), Malaysian Global Innovation and Creativity Centre (MaGIC), DPULZE Shopping Centre; Persiaran Tasik – Cyberview Lodge	Six	Diamond interchange
Sepang		7	Persiaran Selatan I/C	FT 30 Putrajaya Ring Road – Cyberjaya, Taman Selatan, Putrajaya International Convention Centre (PICC), Putrajaya	Six	Cloverleaf interchange
Sepang		8	Dengkil North I/C	FT 214 Malaysia Federal Route 214 – Dengkil	Four	LILO Interchange
Sepang		BR	Dengkil Lake Bridge		Four	
Sepang		BR	Pipeline and river crossing bridge Pipeline crossing and Sungai Langat bridge		Four	
Sepang		9	Dengkil East I/C	FT 31 Malaysia Federal Route 31 – Banting, Dengkil, Semenyih, Bangi, Kajang	Four	Diamond Interchange
Sepang		9A	Bandar Serenia I/C	North–South Expressway Central Link / AH2 – Ipoh, Shah Alam, Nilai, Seremban, Johor Bahru; Persiaran Aman Serenia– Bandar Serenia	Four	Diamond Interchange
Sepang		9B	Sunsuria City I/C	Persiaran Sunsuria – Sunsuria City, Salak Tinggi, Xiamen University Malaysia‌‌‌‌‌	Four	Quadrant Interchange
Sepang		10	Kota Warisan I/C	Persiaran Kota Warisan – Sungai Melut, Kota Warisan, Salak Tinggi ERL station	Four	Diamond interchange
Sepang		L/B	McDonald's and Shell L/B	McDonald's drive thru Shell petrol station	Four	Southbound
Sepang		11	Labohan Dagang–Nilai Route I/C	FT 32 Malaysia Federal Route 32 – Kuala Lumpur International Airport (KLIA), Banting, Salak Tinggi, Sungai Pelek, Bandar Baru Nilai, Nilai	Four	Diamond Interchange (Under Construction); Temporary T Junction
Sepang		BR	Railway crossing bridge		Four	
Sepang		BR	Sungai Labu bridge		Four	
Sepang		12	KLIA Outer Ring Road I/C	FT 27 KLIA Outer Ring Road – KLIA Charter Field Town (Downtown KLIA), Sultan Abdul Samad Mosque (Masjid KLIA), KLIA Quarters, Bandar Enstek, Kota Seriemas, Sepang, Cargo Terminal, Sepang International Circuit; Kuala Lumpur International Airport (KLIA) – Main Terminal Building (KLIA 1), LCCT Terminal (KLIA 2); North–South Expressway Central Link / AH2 – Kuala Lumpur	Four	Interchange
Sepang		13	Kuala Lumpur International Airport (KLIA)	FT 26 KLIA Expressway (To Airport Only) – Kuala Lumpur International Airport (KLIA), Main Terminal Building, Arrival/Departure	Four	
