= KLIA Outer Ring Road =

Road in Malaysia

Federal Route 27
- KLIA Outer Ring Road (KLIAORR) (Jalan Pekeliling)
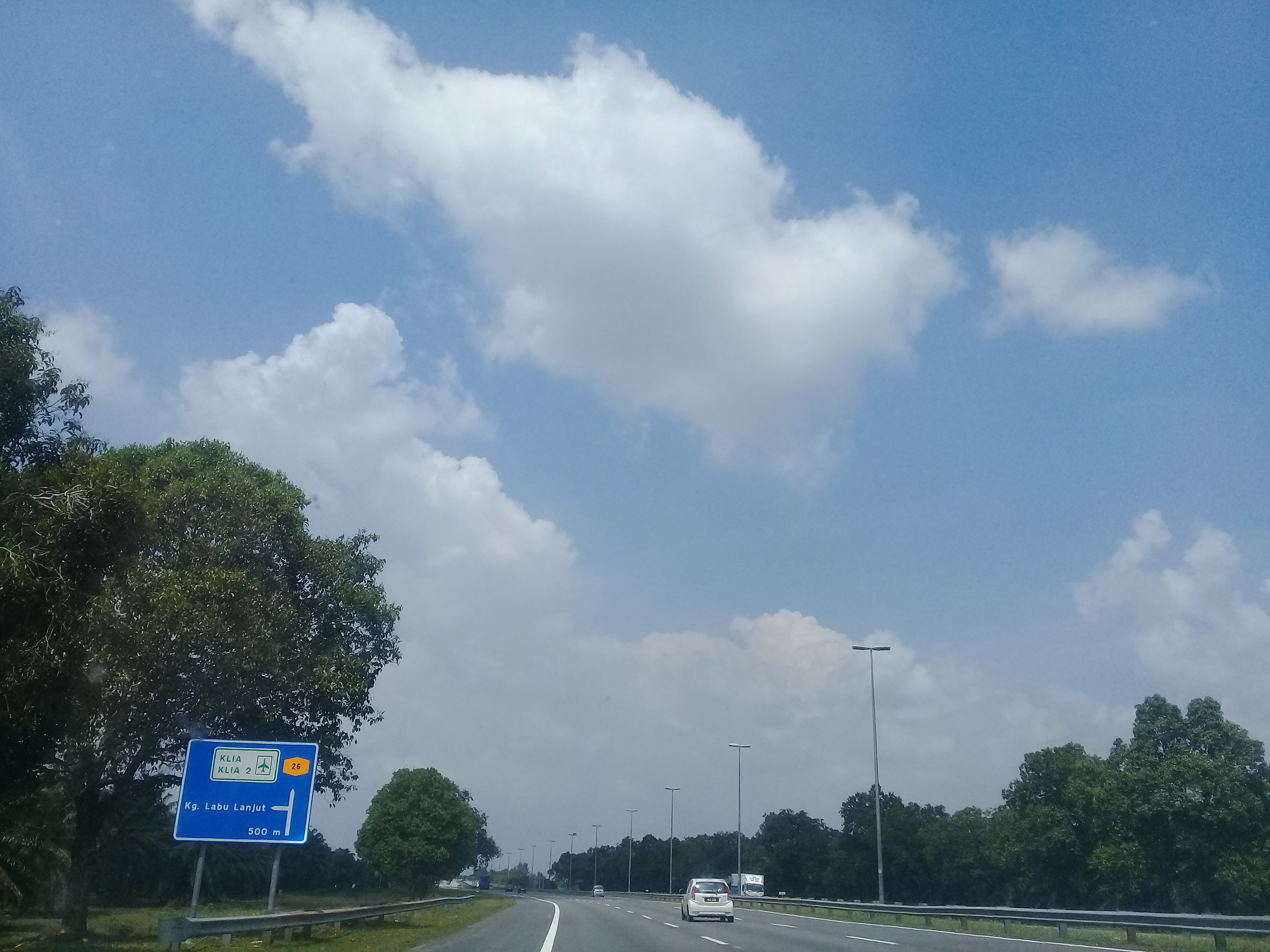

Route information
- Maintained by Malaysian Public Works Department
- Length: 20.0 km (12.4 mi)
- Existed: 1995–present
- History: Completed in 1997

Major junctions
- From: KLIA Expressway interchange
- FT 26 KLIA Expressway; FT 341 Jalan Masjid KLIA; FT 182 Jalan KLIA 1 FT 344 KLIA East Road (Jalan Pekeliling 2); FT 342 Jalan Pekeliling 3 FT 343 Jalan Pekeliling 4 (Paroi–Senawang–KLIA–Salak Tinggi Expressway)
- To: Kompleks Bunga Raya

Location
- Country: Malaysia
- Primary destinations: Banting, Nilai, Sepang International Circuit, Salak Tinggi, Sepang, KLIA Cargo Terminal

Highway system
- Highways in Malaysia; Expressways; Federal; State

KLIA Outer Ring Road (KLIAORR), or Jalan Pekeliling, Federal Route 27, is the second highway and ring road along Kuala Lumpur International Airport (KLIA) after KLIA Expressway (Federal Route 26) in Malaysia. During Formula One Petronas Malaysian Grand Prix championship every year it becomes the main route to Sepang F1 Circuit. From 1 March 2006 until 9 May 2014 it became a main road to Low Cost Carrier Terminal (LCCT).

The Kilometre Zero is located at KLIA Expressway Interchange.

== Features ==
At most sections, the Federal Route 27 was built under the JKR R5 road standard, allowing maximum speed limit of up to 90 km/h.

There are no overlaps, alternate routes, or sections with motorcycle lanes.

== Junction lists ==
The entire route is located in Sepang District, Selangor.

Legend:

- I/C - Interchange, I/S - Intersection, RSA - Rest and service area, OBR - Overhead bridge restaurant, R/R - Restaurant and rest plaza, L/B - Layby, V/P - Vista point, TN - tunnel, T/P - Toll plaza, BR - Bridge
- C - Cloverleaf, S - Stack, T-A - Trumpet-A, T-B - Trumpet-B, DT - Directional-T/Y, SDT - Semi-Directional-T/Y, P-Y - Partial-Y, D - Diamond, P-C - Partial cloverleaf, D-D - Diverging diamond, D-R - Direct ramp

Location	km	mi	Exit	Name	Destinations	Notes
KLIA	0.0	0.0	2701	KLIA Expressway I/C	North–South Expressway Central Link (KLIA Expressway) / FT 26; North–South Expressway Central Link / AH2 – Kuala Lumpur, Ipoh, Shah Alam, Seremban, Johor Bahru; Kuala Lumpur International Airport (KLIA) – Main Terminal Building (KLIA 1), Terminal 2 (KLIA 2)	Trumpet interchange
KLIA	1.0	0.62	–			
KLIA			2702	Jalan Masjid KLIA Exit	FT 341 Jalan Masjid KLIA – Sultan Abdul Samad Mosque (KLIA Mosque), Malaysia Airports main headquarters, KLIA police station, Tabung Haji Complex KLIA	Southbound
KLIA			2702	KLIA 1 Roundabout	FT 182 Jalan KLIA 1 FT 32 Malaysia Federal Route 32 – Banting, Salak Tinggi, Nilai; Kuala Lumpur International Airport (KLIA) – Sultan Abdul Samad Mosque (KLIA Mosque), Main Terminal Building (KLIA 1), KLIA Charter Field Town (KLIA Town Centre), Concorde Inn KLIA, Mitsui Outlet Park	Roundabout
KLIA			2703	Jalan Dagang I/S	Jalan Dagang	T-junctions
KLIA			2704	KLIA North I/C	FT 29 Putrajaya–Cyberjaya Expressway – Salak Tinggi, Dengkil, Putrajaya, Cyberjaya; Kuala Lumpur International Airport (KLIA) – Main Terminal Building	Interchange, Under construction
KLIA			Sungai Labu bridge			
KLIA				Kampung Baru Lanjut	Kampung Baru Lanjut	Junctions; For light vehicles only
KLIA			Sungai Labu bridge			
KLIA			2705	Jalan Pekeliling 1 Exit	Jalan Pekeliling 1	Southbound
KLIA			2706	KLIA East Road I/S	FT 344 KLIA East Road (Jalan Kuarters KLIA) – KLIA Quarters, Bandar Enstek, Kota Seriemas, Salak Tinggi, Sepang, Bagan Lalang	T-junctions
KLIA				Sepang International Circuit	Sepang International Circuit – Main grandstand, National Automotive Museum	Southbound
KLIA			Petronas L/B (Northbound)			
KLIA			2707	Sepang International Circuit I/S	Jalan Pekeliling 3A – KLIA vista point V FT 342 Jalan Pekeliling 3 – Sepang International Circuit (Main grandstand, National Automotive Museum)	Junctions
KLIA	8.0	5.0	–			
KLIA			2708	Jalan Pekeliling 4 I/S	FT 343 Jalan Pekeliling 4 – Malaysian Ministry of Agriculture Quarantine Complex, Custom and Excise Depot Centre, Veterinary Centre, FAMA Complex, Fisheries Quarantine Centre	T-junctions
KLIA	11.0	6.8	–			
KLIA	11.2	7.0	2709	KLIA S3 Roundabout	Jalan KLIA S3 – Malaysia Airports (MAS) Complex, Cargo Complex, Pos Malaysia mail centre, KLIA S3 Town Centre (Paroi–Senawang–KLIA–Salak Tinggi Expressway) – Seremban, Port Dickson (Under planning)	Roundabout
KLIA			2710	KLIA S5 Roundabout	Jalan KLIA S5 – Malaysia Airports (MAHB) Complex, Air Asia Training Centre	Roundabout
KLIA			2711	Tank Farm I/S	Tank Farm – MAS hangar, Air Asia hangar	T-junctions
KLIA				Landing lights		
KLIA				Sewage treatment plant		
KLIA				KLIA Meteorological Station		
KLIA				Kompleks Bunga Raya		
1.000 mi = 1.609 km; 1.000 km = 0.621 mi: Proposed; Incomplete access

== See also ==
- KLIA Expressway
- Jalan KLIA 1
- North–South Expressway Central Link
- Kuala Lumpur International Airport (KLIA)
