= Malaysia Federal Route 341 =

Road in Malaysia

Federal Route 341
- Jalan Masjid KLIA
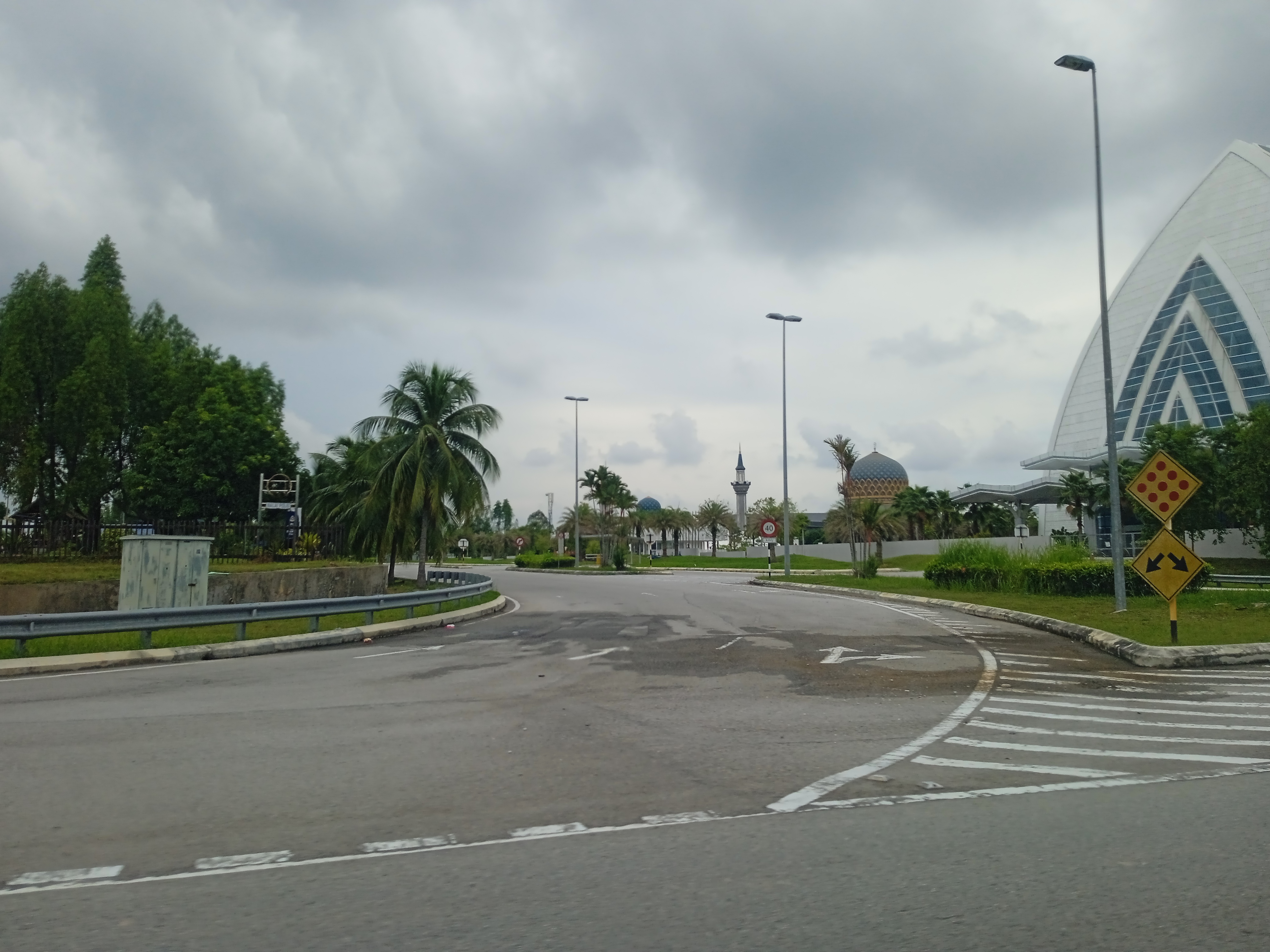

Route information
- Maintained by Malaysian Public Works Department
- Length: 0.5 km (0.31 mi; 1,600 ft)
- Existed: 1995–present
- History: Completed in 1997

Major junctions
- South end: KLIA Outer Ring Road
- FT 27 KLIA Outer Ring Road; FT 182 Jalan KLIA 1
- Northeast end: Jalan KLIA 1

Location
- Country: Malaysia
- Primary destinations: Masjid Sultan Abdul Samad; Tabung Haji Complex KLIA

Highway system
- Highways in Malaysia; Expressways; Federal; State

Jalan Masjid KLIA, Federal Route 341, is an institutional facilities federal road in Kuala Lumpur International Airport (KLIA) in Malaysia.

At most sections, the Federal Route 341 was built under the JKR R5 road standard, allowing maximum speed limit of up to 90 km/h.

== List of junctions ==
km	Exit	Junctions	To	Remarks
		FT 27 KLIA Outer Ring Road	FT 27 KLIA Outer Ring Road East Only; Kuala Lumpur International Airport (KLIA) (Main Terminal); Banting; Salak Tinggi; Nilai; Sepang F1 Circuit; Sepang; Cargo Terminal	
FT 27 KLIA Outer Ring Road (Jalan Pekeliling)
FT 341 Jalan Masjid KLIA
		Malaysia Airports main headquarters		
		Sultan Abdul Samad Mosque (KLIA Mosque)	Sultan Abdul Samad Mosque (KLIA Mosque)	For Muslims only
		KLIA police station		
		Tabung Haji Complex KLIA		
FT 341 Jalan Masjid KLIA
FT 182 Jalan KLIA 1
		FT 182 Jalan KLIA 1	FT 182 Jalan KLIA 1 North; FT 32 Labohan Dagang-Nilai Route; Banting; Salak Tinggi; Nilai South; Kuala Lumpur International Airport (KLIA) (Main Terminal); LCCT Terminal (KLIA 2); KLIA Charter Field Town (KLIA Town Centre); Concorde Hotel KLIA	T-junctions
