= Malaysia Federal Route 182 =

Road in Malaysia

Federal Route 182
- Jalan KLIA 1
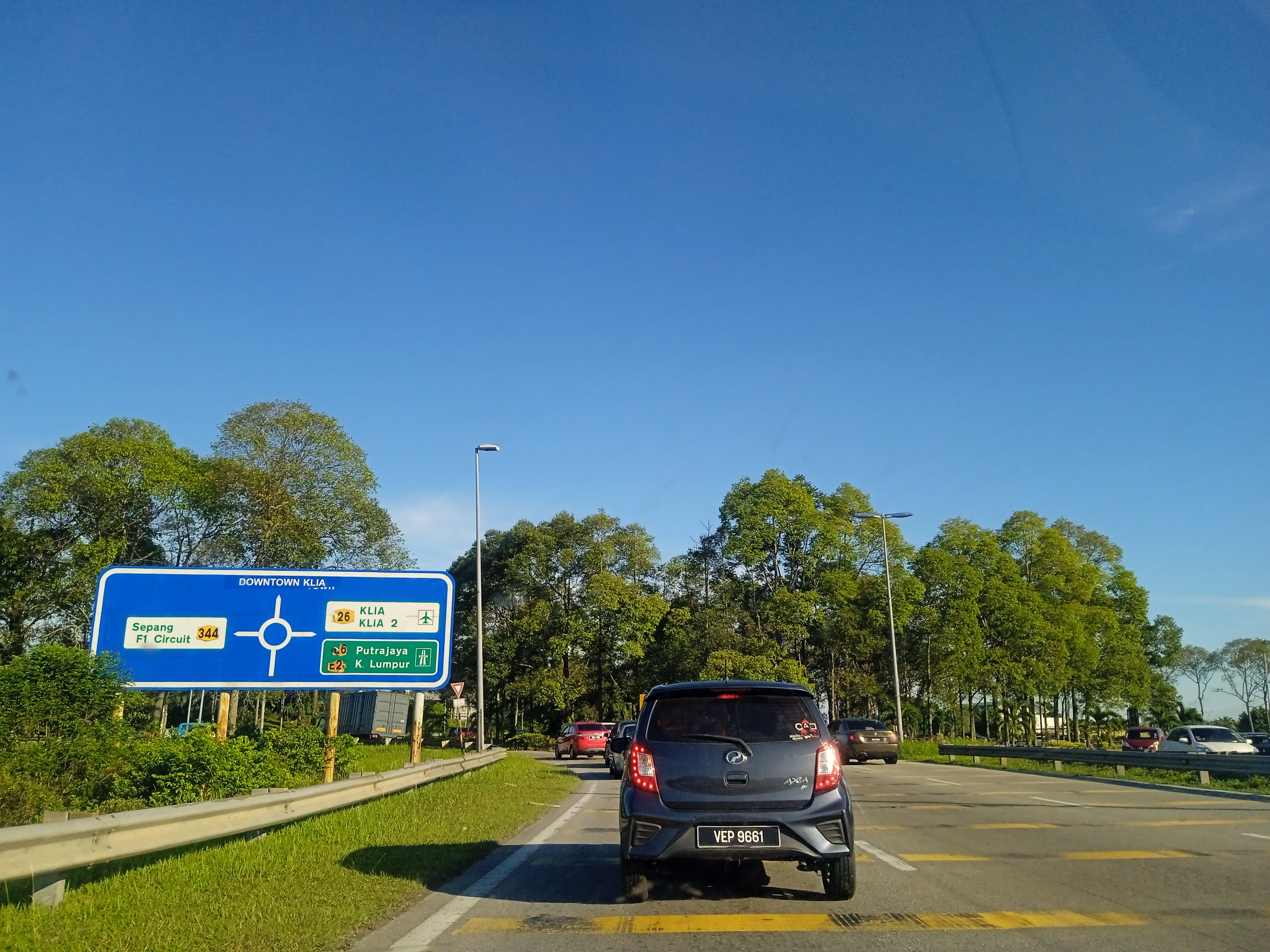

Route information
- Maintained by Malaysian Public Works Department
- Length: 5.00 km (3.11 mi)
- Existed: 1995–present
- History: Completed in 1997

Major junctions
- North end: Labohan Dagang-Nilai Route
- FT 32 Federal Route 32; FT 341 Jalan Masjid KLIA; FT 27 KLIA Outer Ring Road; FT 26 KLIA Expressway
- South end: KLIA Expressway

Location
- Country: Malaysia
- Primary destinations: KLIA Charter Field Town (KLIA Town Centre)

Highway system
- Highways in Malaysia; Expressways; Federal; State

Jalan KLIA 1, Federal Route 182, is the third highway in Kuala Lumpur International Airport (KLIA), Malaysia. It is a main route to KLIA Charter Field Town or KLIA Town Centre. The Kilometre Zero is located at Nilai-KLIA Highway junctions.

== Features ==
At most sections, the Federal Route 182 was built under the JKR R5 road standard, allowing maximum speed limit of up to 90 km/h.

== Junction lists ==
The entire route is located in Sepang District, Selangor.

Legend:

- I/C - Interchange, I/S - Intersection, RSA - Rest and service area, OBR - Overhead bridge restaurant, R/R - Restaurant and rest plaza, L/B - Layby, V/P - Vista point, TN - tunnel, T/P - Toll plaza, BR - Bridge
- C - Cloverleaf, S - Stack, T-A - Trumpet-A, T-B - Trumpet-B, DT - Directional-T/Y, SDT - Semi-Directional-T/Y, P-Y - Partial-Y, D - Diamond, P-C - Partial cloverleaf, D-D - Diverging diamond, D-R - Direct ramp

Location	km	mi	Exit	Name	Destinations	Notes
KLIA	0.0	0.0	18201	Labohan Dagang-Nilai Route I/S	FT 32 Malaysia Federal Route 32 – Banting, Dengkil, Salak Tinggi, Nilai	T-junctions
KLIA			18202	Jalan Masjid KLIA I/S	FT 341 Jalan Masjid KLIA – Sultan Abdul Samad Mosque (KLIA Mosque), Malaysia Airports main headquarters, KLIA police station, Tabung Haji Complex KLIA	T-junctions
KLIA			18203	Jalan KLIA 1 Roundabout	FT 27 KLIA Outer Ring Road – Kuala Lumpur International Airport (KLIA) T1 and T2, KLIA Quarters, Bandar Enstek, Kota Seriemas, Sepang, Cargo Terminal, Sepang International Circuit; North–South Expressway Central Link / AH2 – Kuala Lumpur, Johor Bahru	Roundabout
KLIA				Mitsui Outlet Park	Mitsui Outlet Park	Northbound
KLIA				KLIA Airport Radar		
KLIA			18204	Bulatan Charter Field Town Roundabout	Jalan KLIA 1 – Concorde Inn KLIA; Jalan KLIA 1/60A – KLIA Charter Field Town (KLIA Town Centre); Jalan KLIA 1 – KLIA Professional and Management College (KPMC)	Roundabout
KLIA				Jalan CTA 3		No entry
KLIA				KLIA Main Car Park	Main car park	Southbound
KLIA	5.0	3.1	18205	KLIA Expressway Exit	FT 26 KLIA Expressway – Kuala Lumpur International Airport (KLIA) T1, Main car park North–South Expressway Central Link / AH2 – Kuala Lumpur, Johor Bahru	
1.000 mi = 1.609 km; 1.000 km = 0.621 mi

== See also ==
- KLIA Expressway
- KLIA Outer Ring Road
- KLIA East Road
- Kuala Lumpur International Airport (KLIA)
