= Persiaran APEC =

Road in Malaysia

Route information
- Existed: 1997–present
- History: Completed in 1999

Major junctions
- North end: Cyberjaya North Interchange; FT 29 Putrajaya-Cyberjaya Expressway
- FT 29 Putrajaya-Cyberjaya Expressway; Persiaran Garden Residence; North–South Expressway Central Link Putrajaya Link; Persiaran Multimedia; Persiaran Rimba Permai; Persiaran Cyber Point Selatan
- South end: Cyberjaya; Persiaran Cyber Point Selatan junctions

Location
- Country: Malaysia

Highway system
- Highways in Malaysia; Expressways; Federal; State

Persiaran APEC is a dual-carriageway avenue in Cyberjaya, Selangor, Malaysia. It connects Putrajaya-Cyberjaya Expressway interchange in the north to Cyberjaya in the south. The avenue was named after the Asia-Pacific Economic Cooperation (APEC) in 1999 in conjunction of the 10th APEC Summit that was in Kuala Lumpur on 17 to 18 November 1998.

== Lists of interchanges ==
| Km | Exit | Interchange | To | Remarks |
|---|---|---|---|---|
| | | Cyberjaya North Interchange | FT 29 Putrajaya-Cyberjaya Expressway North; Damansara–Puchong Expressway Puchong; Damansara–Puchong Expressway Shah Alam; Damansara–Puchong Expressway Petaling Jaya; Kajang Dispersal Link Expressway Kajang; Damansara–Puchong Expressway Kuala Lumpur South; FT 29 Putrajaya; FT 214 Dengkil; FT 26 Kuala Lumpur International Airport (KLIA); North–South Expressway Southern Route AH2 Johor Bahru | Trumpet interchange |
FT 29 Putrajaya-cyberjaya Expressway; Start/End of highway
Persiaran APEC
| | | Jalan Pulau Meranti Junctions | West; Jalan Pulau Meranti; Pulau Meranti | Interchange |
| | | Jalan Teknokrat 1 Junctions | West; Jalan Teknokrat 1 | T-junctions |
| | | Persiaran Gardens Residence Junctions | Northeast; Persiaran Gardens Residence; Garden Residence | T-junctions |
| | | Jalan Teknokrat 1 Junctions | Southwest; Jalan Teknokrat 1 Limkokwing University Of Creative Technology (LUCT); Cyberjaya satellite earth station | T-junctions |
| | | Putrajaya Link Interchange | North–South Expressway Central Link Putrajaya Link | T-junctions; No entry |
| | | Persiaran Semarak Api Junctions | West; Persiaran Semarak Api; Cyberjaya Lake Gardens; Majlis Perbandaran Sepang (MPSepang) headquarters Raja Haji Fisabilillah Mosque; TM Complex Cyberjaya; North–South Expressway Central Link Putrajaya Link; North–South Expressway Central Link Putrajaya; Maju Expressway Kuala Lumpur; North–South Expressway Central Link AH2 Shah Alam; North–South Expressway Central Link AH2 Kuala Lumpur International Airport (KLIA); North–South Expressway Southern Route AH2 Johor Bahru | T-junctions |
| | | Nippon Telegraph and Telephone (NTT) | | |
| | | Cyberjaya; Persiaran Multimedia Junctions | Persiaran Multimedia West; Multimedia University (MMU); HSBC banking centre Shell; DPULZE Shopping Centre East; Cyberview Lodge; City Command Centre | Junctions |
Persiaran APEC
| | | Cyberjaya; Persiaran Rimba Permai Junctions | Persiaran Rimba Permai West; Cyber Point; Persiaran Ceria East; Sekolah Seri Permai; FT 29 Putrajaya-Cyberjaya Expressway; Damansara–Puchong Expressway Puchong; Damansara–Puchong Expressway Shah Alam; Damansara–Puchong Expressway Petaling Jaya; Kajang Dispersal Link Expressway Kajang; Maju Expressway Kuala Lumpur; FT 29 Putrajaya; FT 31 Dengkil; FT 26 Kuala Lumpur International Airport (KLIA) | Junctions |
| | | Malaysian Global Innovation and Creativity Centre (MaGIC) | Malaysian Global Innovation and Creativity Centre (MaGIC) | |
| | | Cyberjaya; Persiaran Cyber Point Selatan Junctions | North; Persiaran Cyber Point Selatan; Cyber Point | Junctions |
