= Paroi–Senawang–KLIA–Salak Tinggi Expressway =

Proposed road in Malaysia

Paroi–Senawang–KLIA Expressway

Route information
- Length: 45 km (28 mi)
- History: Under planning stage

Major junctions
- Northeast end: Paroi
- Kajang–Seremban Highway; FT 51 Federal Route 51; FT 1 Federal Route 1 North–South Expressway Southern Route / AH2; Seremban–Port Dickson Highway; FT 27 KLIA Outer Ring Road
- Northwest end: Kuala Lumpur International Airport (KLIA)

Location
- Country: Malaysia
- Primary destinations: Senawang, Mambau, Bandar Sri Sendayan

Highway system
- Highways in Malaysia; Expressways; Federal; State

The Paroi–Senawang–KLIA Expressway (PSKE) is a proposed expressway in Negeri Sembilan and Selangor states, Malaysia. It will link up the Seremban suburbs of Paroi and Senawang to Kuala Lumpur International Airport (KLIA). The 45 km (28 mi) expressway will be built to reduce traffic jam along the North–South Expressway Southern Route from Senawang to Nilai North.

== Route background ==
The interchanges will be at Paroi, Senawang, Rasah Jaya, Mambau South, Bukit Nenas, Sepang to KLIA (South).

== Interchange lists (Planned) ==
Legend:

- I/C - Interchange, I/S - Intersection, RSA - Rest and service area, OBR - Overhead bridge restaurant, R/R - Restaurant and rest plaza, L/B - Layby, V/P - Vista point, TN - tunnel, T/P - Toll plaza, BR - Bridge
- C - Cloverleaf, S - Stack, T-A - Trumpet-A, T-B - Trumpet-B, DT - Directional-T/Y, SDT - Semi-Directional-T/Y, P-Y - Partial-Y, D - Diamond, P-C - Partial cloverleaf, D-D - Diverging diamond, D-R - Direct ramp

State	District	Km	Exit	Name	Destinations	Notes
Through to Kajang–Seremban Highway
Negeri Sembilan	Seremban		----	Paroi I/C	FT 51 Malaysia Federal Route 51 – Seremban town centre, Ampangan, Kuala Pilah, Seri Menanti, Ulu Bendol Recreational Forest	Multi-level stack interchange
Negeri Sembilan	Seremban		----	Senawang I/C	FT 1 Malaysia Federal Route 1 – Seremban town centre, Rembau, Tampin	Interchange
Negeri Sembilan	Seremban		----	Senawang-NSE I/C	North–South Expressway Southern Route / AH2 – Kuala Lumpur, Port Dickson, Pedas/Linggi, Malacca, Johor Bahru	Interchange
Negeri Sembilan	Seremban		----	Rasah Jaya I/C	Rasah Jaya, Rasah	Interchange
Negeri Sembilan	Seremban		----	Nyatoh I/C	N7 Jalan Rantau – Nyatoh, Rantau	Interchange
Negeri Sembilan	Seremban		BR	Sungai Linggi bridge		
Negeri Sembilan	Seremban		BR	Railway crossing bridge		
Negeri Sembilan	Seremban		----	Mambau (South) I/C	Seremban–Port Dickson Highway – Seremban, Mambau, Lukut, Port Dickson, Teluk Kemang	Interchange
Negeri Sembilan	Seremban		----	Bukit Nenas I/C	FT 195 Seremban–Bukit Nenas Highway – Bukit Nenas, Bandar Sri Sendayan, Seremban	Interchange
Selangor	Sepang		----	Sepang I/C	B48 Jalan Besar Salak – Sepang, Salak Tinggi	Interchange
Selangor	Sepang		----	KLIA (South) I/C	FT 27 KLIA Outer Ring Road – Kuala Lumpur International Airport (KLIA); North–South Expressway Central Link / AH2 – Kuala Lumpur	Interchange
Selangor	Sepang		----	Salak Tinggi I/C	North–South Expressway Central Link / AH2 – Kuala Lumpur International Airport (KLIA), Kuala Lumpur, Seremban, Labu, Johor Bahru	Trumpet interchange
