= Malaysia Federal Route 32 =

Road in Malaysia

Federal Route 32
- Labohan Dagang–Nilai Route (Nilai–KLIA Highway)

Route information
- Maintained by Malaysian Public Works Department
- Length: 26.0 km (16.2 mi)

Major junctions
- West end: Tanjung Dua Belas, Selangor
- FT 31 Federal Route 31; FT 248 Federal Route 248; FT 26 KLIA Expressway; FT 29 Putrajaya–Cyberjaya Expressway; FT 182 Federal Route 182; B48 State Route B48; North–South Expressway Southern Route / AH2; FT 3265 Federal Route 3265
- East end: Nilai, Negeri Sembilan

Location
- Country: Malaysia
- Major cities: Banting, Dengkil, Putrajaya, Cyberjaya, Salak Tinggi, Bandar Baru Nilai

Highway system
- Highways in Malaysia; Expressways; Federal; State

Labohan Dagang–Nilai Route, also known as Nilai–KLIA Highway, Federal Route 32 (formerly Selangor State Route B20 or Negeri Sembilan State Route N20), is a major highway in the Multimedia Super Corridor area in Selangor and Negeri Sembilan states, Malaysia. The 26.0 km (16.2 mi) federal highway connects Tanjung Dua Belas, Selangor in the west to Nilai, Negeri Sembilan in the east.

== Route background ==
The Kilometre Zero of the Federal Route 32 starts from Nilai, Negeri Sembilan.

== History ==
The Nilai–KLIA Highway built in conjunction of the opening of the Kuala Lumpur International Airport, known as KLIA East Entrance Road in that time and listed as part of 8th Malaysia Plan (RMK-8). The Nilai–KLIA Highway built as upgrading of existing State Route B20/N20. In 2010, the highway was gazetted as the federal roads by JKR as Federal Route 32.

== Features ==
At most sections, the Nilai–KLIA Highway was built under the JKR R5 road standard as a dual-carriageway highway with partial access control, with a speed limit of 90 km/h (56 mph).

There are no overlaps, alternate routes, or sections with motorcycle lanes.

== Interchange lists ==
Legend:

- I/C - Interchange, I/S - Intersection, RSA - Rest and service area, OBR - Overhead bridge restaurant, R/R - Restaurant and rest plaza, L/B - Layby, V/P - Vista point, TN - tunnel, T/P - Toll plaza, BR - Bridge
- C - Cloverleaf, S - Stack, T-A - Trumpet-A, T-B - Trumpet-B, DT - Directional-T/Y, SDT - Semi-Directional-T/Y, P-Y - Partial-Y, D - Diamond, P-C - Partial cloverleaf, D-D - Diverging diamond, D-R - Direct ramp

State	District	Location	km	mi	Exit	Name	Destinations	Notes
Selangor	Kuala Langat	Labohan Dagang			3213	Tanjung Dua Belas I/C	FT 31 Malaysia Federal Route 31 – Banting, Klang, Teluk Panglima Garang, Dengkil, Putrajaya, Cyberjaya, Semenyih	Trumpet interchange
Selangor	Kuala Langat	Labohan Dagang			3212	Kampung Labohan Dagang (West) I/C	Kampung Labohan Dagang	Directional-T interchange
Selangor	Kuala Langat	Labohan Dagang			3211	Kampung Labohan Dagang (East) I/C	Kampung Labohan Dagang	Diamond interchange
Selangor	Kuala Langat	Labohan Dagang			Sungai Langat bridge			
Selangor	Kuala Langat	Bukit Changgang			3210	Jalan Bukit Changgang I/C	FT 248 Jalan Bukit Changgang (Jalan Perek Kanan) – Kampung Bukit Changgang	Junctions
Selangor	Kuala Langat	Bukit Changgang				Kampung Tengah	Taman Seri Ehsan	T-junctions
Selangor	Kuala Langat	Bukit Changgang			3209	KLIA Free Trade Zone I/S	KLIA Free Trade Zone, TNB KLIA power stations, KLIA District Cooling Systems	Junctions
Selangor	Sepang	KLIA			3208	Kuala Lumpur International Airport (KLIA); Jalan KLIA 1 I/S	FT 182 Jalan KLIA 1 Kuala Lumpur International Airport (KLIA) – Main Terminal Building (KLIA 1), Sultan Abdul Samad Mosque (KLIA Mosque), KLIA Charter Field Town (KLIA Town Centre), Concorde Inn KLIA; FT 27 KLIA Outer Ring Road – Sepang, KLIA Quarters, Cargo terminal, Sepang International Circuit; FT 26 KLIA Expressway – Kuala Lumpur International Airport (KLIA) – Main Terminal Building (KLIA 1), Terminal 2 (KLIA 2); North–South Expressway Central Link / AH2 – Ipoh, Shah Alam, Kuala Lumpur, Johor Bahru	T-junctions
Selangor	Sepang	KLIA				KLIA Fire Stations		
Selangor	Sepang	KLIA			Sungai Labu bridge			
Selangor	Sepang	Salak Tinggi			3207	Salak Tinggi West I/S	FT 29 Putrajaya–Cyberjaya Expressway – Putrajaya, Cyberjaya, Kuala Lumpur International Airport (KLIA), Sepang International Circuit; Damansara–Puchong Expressway – Puchong, Petaling Jaya	Diamond interchange
Selangor	Sepang	Salak Tinggi				Sepang Municipal Council (MPSpg) main headquarters		
Selangor	Sepang	Salak Tinggi			3206	Salak Tinggi Town Centre I/S	Jalan ST 1/1 – Town Centre, Sepang District and Land Office, Masjid Sultan Hishamuddin, Stadium PUAS	T-junctions
Selangor	Sepang	Salak Tinggi			3205	Salak Tinggi; Salak Tinggi I/C	B48 Selangor State Route B48 – Dengkil, Semenyih, Sepang, Labu, Bandar Enstek	Diamond interchange
Negeri Sembilan	Seremban	Nilai			3204	Sempadan BBN Roundabout	Persiaran BBN – INTI, Nilai	Roundabout
Negeri Sembilan	Seremban	Nilai				Jalan BBN 11/1 I/S	Jalan BBN 11/1 – INTI	T-junctions
Negeri Sembilan	Seremban	Nilai				Persiaran Ilmu BBN I/S	Persiaran Ilmu BBN – Nilai University, Universiti Sains Islam Malaysia (USIM)	T-junctions
Negeri Sembilan	Seremban	Nilai			3203	Bandar Baru Nilai; BBN Roundabout	Persiaran Perbandaran BBN – Universiti Sains Islam Malaysia (USIM); Persiaran Utama BBN – Town Centre, Nilai	Roundabout
Negeri Sembilan	Seremban	Nilai				Bandar Baru Nilai		
Negeri Sembilan	Seremban	Nilai			3202	Nilai–NSE I/C	North–South Expressway Southern Route / AH2 – Kuala Lumpur, Kajang, Shah Alam, KILA, Klang, Bangi, Seremban, Malacca, Johor Bahru	T-junctions
Negeri Sembilan	Seremban	Nilai				Taman Semarak	Taman Semarak	T-junctions
Negeri Sembilan	Seremban	Nilai				Nilai Industrial Area	Nilai Industrial Area	T-junctions
Negeri Sembilan	Seremban	Nilai	0.0	0.0	3201	Nilai Industrial Area I/S	Jalan Emas – Nilai Industrial Area, Nilai 3 Wholesale Centre	T-junctions
Negeri Sembilan	Seremban	Nilai			3201	Nilai; Jalan Nilai–Pajam I/S	FT 3265 Malaysia Federal Route 3265 – Nilai, Pajam, Mantin, Seremban	T-junctions with ramp to FT32
1.000 mi = 1.609 km; 1.000 km = 0.621 mi

== See also ==
- Sagong Tasi - a landmark land rights case in Malaysia
