= Malaysia Federal Route 344 =

Road in Malaysia

Federal Route 344
- KLIA East Road (Jalan Kuarters KLIA)
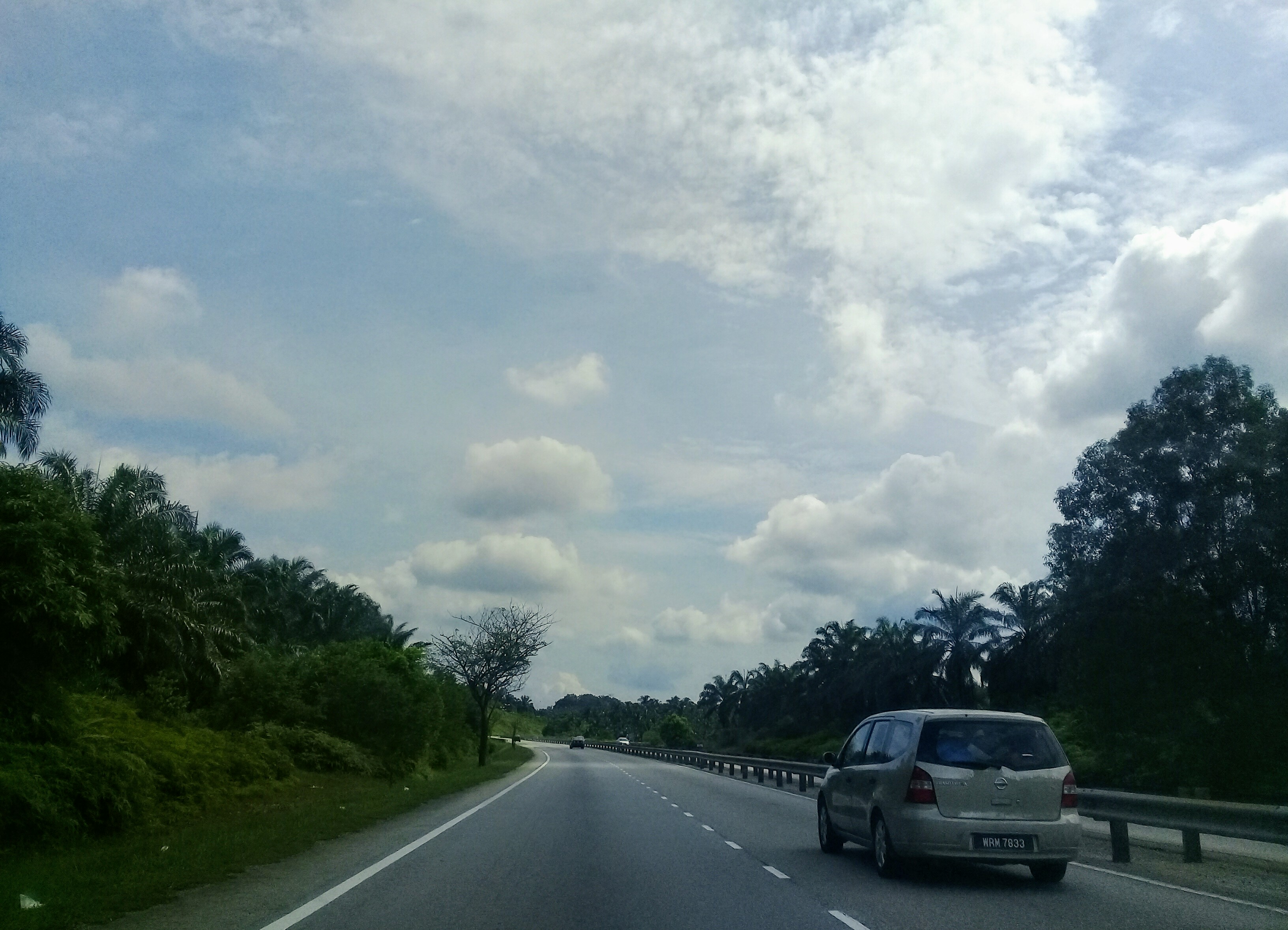

Route information
- Maintained by Malaysian Public Works Department
- Length: 2.8 km (1.7 mi)
- Existed: 1995–present
- History: Completed in 1997

Major junctions
- West end: Sepang International Circuit, Selangor
- FT 27 KLIA Outer Ring Road; FT 342 Federal Route 342; B48 State Route B48
- East end: KLIA Quarters, Negeri Sembilan

Location
- Country: Malaysia
- Primary destinations: Kuala Lumpur International Airport (KLIA) , Sepang, Nilai, Labu, Kota Seriemas, Bandar Enstek

Highway system
- Highways in Malaysia; Expressways; Federal; State

The KLIA East Road, or Jalan Kuarters KLIA, Federal Route 344, is a fourth highway in Kuala Lumpur International Airport (KLIA) in Malaysia that connects the KLIA Outer Ring Road (Federal Route 27) junctions near Sepang International Circuit in Selangor to KLIA Quarters in Negeri Sembilan. It is also a main route to Sepang and Labu town.

The Kilometre Zero is located at Sepang International Circuit junctions of the KLIA Outer Ring Road (Federal Route 27)

At most sections, the Federal Route 344 was built under the JKR R5 road standard, allowing maximum speed limit of up to 90 km/h.

== Junction lists ==
Legend:

- I/C - Interchange, I/S - Intersection, RSA - Rest and service area, OBR - Overhead bridge restaurant, R/R - Restaurant and rest plaza, L/B - Layby, V/P - Vista point, TN - tunnel, T/P - Toll plaza, BR - Bridge
- C - Cloverleaf, S - Stack, T-A - Trumpet-A, T-B - Trumpet-B, DT - Directional-T/Y, SDT - Semi-Directional-T/Y, P-Y - Partial-Y, D - Diamond, P-C - Partial cloverleaf, D-D - Diverging diamond, D-R - Direct ramp

State	District	Location	km	mi	Exit	Name	Destinations	Notes
Selangor	Sepang	KLIA	0.0	0.0	34401	KLIA Outer Ring Road I/S	FT 27 KLIA Outer Ring Road – Kuala Lumpur International Airport (KLIA) (KLIA T1 and KLIA T2), Banting, Cargo terminal North–South Expressway Central Link / AH2 – Kuala Lumpur, Johor Bahru	T-junctions
Selangor	Sepang	KLIA				Sepang International Circuit		
Selangor	Sepang	KLIA			34402	Sepang International Circuit I/S	FT 342 Malaysia Federal Route 342 – Sepang International Circuit, Main grandstand, National Automotive Museum	T-junctions
Selangor	Sepang	KLIA			Sungai Chinchang bridge			
Selangor	Sepang	KLIA			34403	Jalan Besar Salak I/S	B48 Selangor State Route B48 – Salak Tinggi, Nilai, Sepang, Bagan Lalang	Junctions
Negeri Sembilan	Seremban	KLIA Quarters				KLIA Quarters		
Negeri Sembilan	Seremban	KLIA Quarters	2.8	1.7	34404	Bulatan Kuarters KLIA Roundabout	Persiaran Millenia 1 – Kota Seriemas, Nilai; Persiaran Millenia 2 – Bandar Enstek	Roundabout
1.000 mi = 1.609 km; 1.000 km = 0.621 mi

== See also ==
- KLIA Outer Ring Road
- Jalan KLIA 1
- KLIA Expressway
- Kuala Lumpur International Airport (KLIA)
