= Abdul Samad (disambiguation) =

'Abd al-Samad is a popular Arabic given name.

ʻAbd al-Ṣamad may also refer to:

== Buildings ==
- Sultan Abdul Samad Building, Kuala Lumpur
- Sultan Abdul Samad Mosque, Selangor
- Makam Sultan Abdul Samad, Selangor

== People ==
- Abdul Samad (admiral)
- Abdul Samad (Indian cricketer), who plays for Jammu & Kashmir
- Abdul Samad (Pakistani cricketer)

== Other uses ==
- The Abdulsamad Brothers (Khiry, Hakim, Tajh and Bilal) part of The Boys
