= Malaysia Federal Route 248 =

Road in Malaysia

Federal Route 248
- Jalan Bukit Changgang (Jalan Perak Kanan)

Route information
- Length: 2.6 km (1.6 mi)

Major junctions
- Northwest end: Kampung Bukit Changgang
- FT 31 Federal Route 31; FT 32 Federal Route 32
- Southeast end: Labohan Dagang–Nilai Route

Location
- Country: Malaysia
- Primary destinations: Taman D'Menara

Highway system
- Highways in Malaysia; Expressways; Federal; State

Jalan Bukit Changgang, or Jalan Perak Kanan, Federal Route 248 (formerly Selangor Federal Route B20), is a federal road in Selangor, Malaysia. The Kilometre Zero is at Kampung Bukit Changgang.

== History ==
In 2012, the road was gazetted as the federal roads by JKR as Federal Route 248.

== Features ==
At most sections, the Federal Route 248 was built under the JKR R5 road standard, allowing maximum speed limit of up to 90 km/h.

== Junction lists ==
The entire route is located in Kuala Langat District, Selangor.

Legend:

- I/C - Interchange, I/S - Intersection, RSA - Rest and service area, OBR - Overhead bridge restaurant, R/R - Restaurant and rest plaza, L/B - Layby, V/P - Vista point, TN - tunnel, T/P - Toll plaza, BR - Bridge

Location	km	Name	Destinations	Notes
Bukit Changgang	0.0	Kampung Bukit Changgang	FT 31 Malaysia Federal Route 31 – Teluk Datok, Banting, Klang, Dengkil, Putrajaya, Cyberjaya, Semenyih, Bangi	3-way intersection
Bukit Changgang		Jalan Berlian Kanan	Jalan Berlian Kanan	4-way intersection
Bukit Changgang		Jalan Intan Kanan	Jalan Intan Kanan	4-way intersection
Bukit Changgang		Taman D'Menara	Jalan Menara Utama – Taman D'Menara	3-way intersection
Bukit Changgang		Sungai Langat bridge		
Bukit Changgang	2.6	Labohan Dagang-Nilai Route	FT 32 Malaysia Federal Route 32 – Nilai, Salak Tinggi, Sepang, Kuala Lumpur International Airport (KLIA); North–South Expressway Central Link / AH2 – Kuala Lumpur	3-way intersection From/to Nilai/KLIA only
1.000 mi = 1.609 km; 1.000 km = 0.621 mi: Incomplete access
