= KLIA Expressway =

Road in Malaysia

Federal Route 26 and part of Expressway 6
- KLIA Expressway
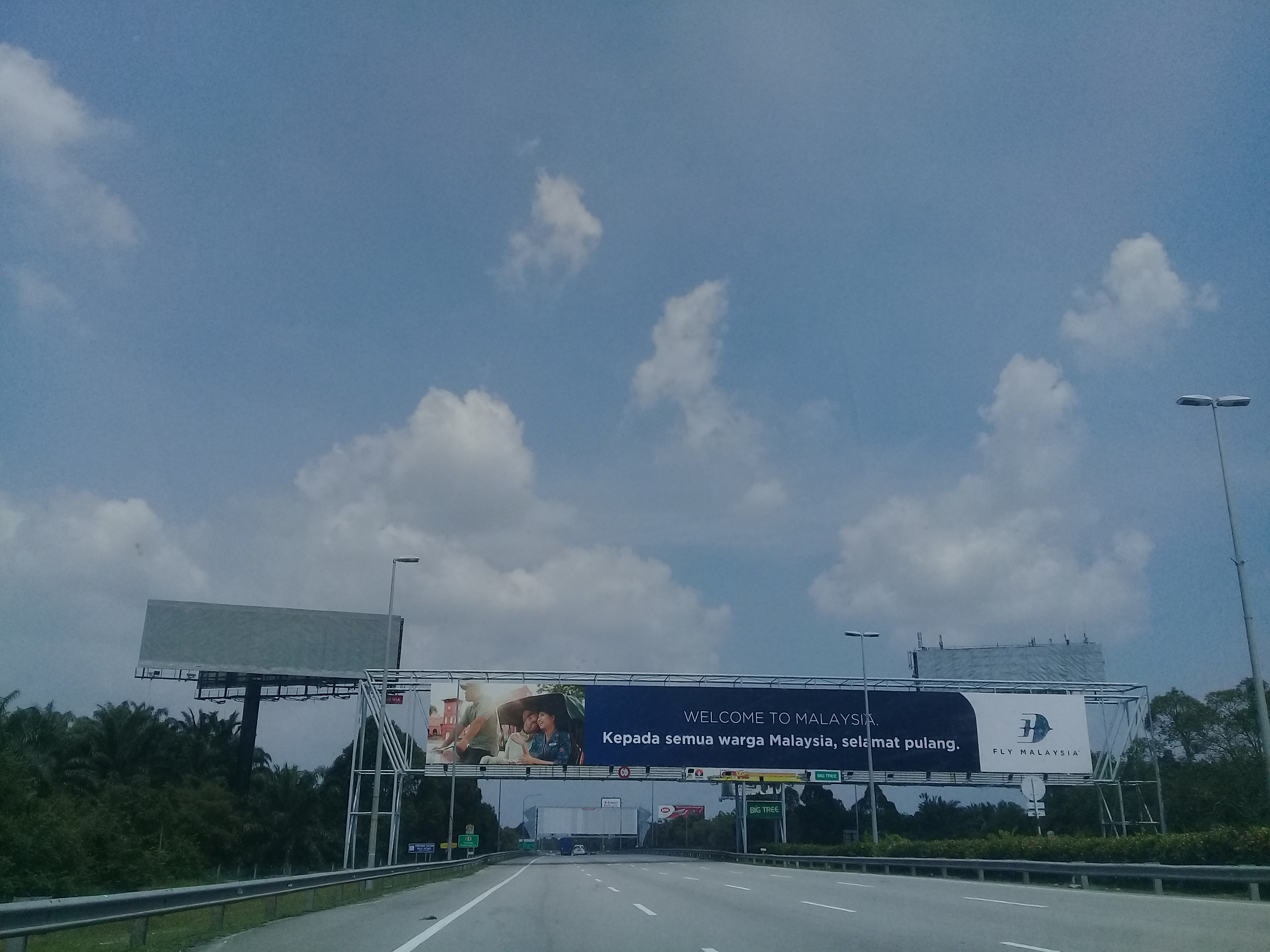

Route information
- Maintained by PLUS Malaysia Berhad with its subsidiary Projek Lebuhraya Usahasama Berhad (on tolled segment of the North–South Expressway Central Link and Public Works Department (on KLIA airport area segment)
- Length: 11.0 km (6.8 mi)
- Existed: 1995–present
- History: Completed in 1997

Major junctions
- North end: KLIA Interchange; North–South Expressway Central Link / AH2
- North–South Expressway Central Link / AH2; Maju Expressway; FT 27 KLIA Outer Ring Road; FT 182 Jalan KLIA 1 FT 29 Putrajaya–Cyberjaya Expressway
- South end: Kuala Lumpur International Airport (KLIA); Main Terminal Building

Location
- Country: Malaysia
- Primary destinations: Banting, Nilai, Kuala Lumpur International Airport (KLIA), Sepang

Highway system
- Highways in Malaysia; Expressways; Federal; State

KLIA Expressway, currently known as Madani Expressway (Malay: Lebuh Madani), E6 and Federal Route 26, is an expressway in Sepang, Selangor, Malaysia. It serves as the main access road to Kuala Lumpur International Airport (KLIA), as well as the nearby Sepang International Circuit and Bandar Enstek.

The total length of the expressway is 11.4 km (7.1 mi). Starting from the Kilometre Zero or A Zero (A0) at KLIA Interchange of the North–South Expressway Central Link E6, the first 5.9 km (3.7 mi) of the expressway is maintained as part of the North–South Expressway Central Link E6 by PLUS Expressway Berhad. The remaining sections of expressway connecting to KLIA is numbered as Federal Route 26 and maintained by the Malaysian Public Works Department.

On August 5, 2025, the sections of Federal Route 26 maintained by the Malaysian Public Works Department were officially gazetted as the Madani Expressway.

== Features ==
- 6-lane carriageway
- 110 km/h speed limit on PLUS section
- Variable Message Signs (VMS)
- Emergency telephones
- Many billboards along this expressway
- 8 lanes of dual carriageway from KLIA airport boundary to KLIA Main Terminal Building

At most sections, the Federal Route 26 was built under the JKR R5 road standard, with a speed limit to 90 km/h.

There is one overlap: KLIA Interchange–KLIA airport boundary : E6 North–South Expressway Central Link.

There are no alternate routes or sections with motorcycle lanes.

== Interchange and layby lists ==
The entire route is located in Selangor.

Legend:

- I/C - Interchange, I/S - Intersection, RSA - Rest and service area, OBR - Overhead bridge restaurant, R/R - Restaurant and rest plaza, L/B - Layby, V/P - Vista point, TN - tunnel, T/P - Toll plaza, BR - Bridge
- C - Cloverleaf, S - Stack, T-A - Trumpet-A, T-B - Trumpet-B, DT - Directional-T/Y, SDT - Semi-Directional-T/Y, P-Y - Partial-Y, D - Diamond, P-C - Partial cloverleaf, D-D - Diverging diamond, D-R - Direct ramp

=== Original section ===
==== Dual carriageway section ====
District	Location	km	mi	Exit	Name	Destinations	Notes
Sepang	Dengkil	0.0	0.0	2601	KLIA I/C	North–South Expressway Central Link / AH2 – Ipoh, Shah Alam, USJ, Kuala Lumpur (Jalan Duta, Damansara, Jalan Tun Razak, Bukit Jalil, KL Sports City, Sungai Besi, Ampang, KLCC), Putrajaya, Cyberjaya, Kajang, Nilai, Seremban, Malacca, Johor Bahru	Trumpet interchange
Sepang	Dengkil	1.0	0.62	–			
Sepang	Dengkil			KLIA Toll Plaza			
Sepang	Dengkil	2.0	1.2	KLIA Toll Plaza Customer Service Centre			
Kuala Langat	Bukit Changgang			Sungai Langat bridge			
Kuala Langat	Bukit Changgang	5.0	3.1	2602	Maju Expressway I/C	Maju Expressway – Kuala Lumpur (Jalan Tun Razak), Putrajaya, Cyberjaya	Interchange; Under planning
Sepang	KLIA			2603	Jalan Pekeliling I/C	FT 27 KLIA Outer Ring Road (Jalan Pekeliling) – Banting, Salak Tinggi, Nilai, Sepang, Bandar Enstek, Cargo Terminal, Sepang International Circuit, Sultan Abdul Samad Mosque (KLIA Mosque), Malaysia Airports main headquarters	Trumpet interchange
Sepang	KLIA	8.0	5.0	–			
Sepang	KLIA			Mitsui Outlet Park (KLIA bound)			
Sepang	KLIA			KLIA Gateway Arch			
Sepang	KLIA			Shell Layby (Kuala Lumpur bound)			
Sepang	KLIA			Petronas Layby (Kuala Lumpur bound)			
Sepang	KLIA			Petronas Layby (KLIA bound)			
Sepang	KLIA				Elevated U-Turn	FT 26 – KLIA (Main Terminal Building), klia2	Elevated U-Turn; From KLIA Main Terminal Building only
Sepang	KLIA			2604B	KLIA 2 I/C	FT 26 Madani Expressway (KLIA 2 Section); Kuala Lumpur International Airport 2 (klia2) – Main Terminal Building, Gateway @ klia2, Main car park	Interchange
Sepang	KLIA				KLIA Bound	Main Terminal Building	Start/end of separated carriageway
1.000 mi = 1.609 km; 1.000 km = 0.621 mi: Electronic toll collection; Proposed

==== One way single carriageway section ====
Location	km	mi	Exit	Name	Destinations	Notes
KLIA T1			From dual carriageway only			
KLIA T1				U-Turn	FT 26 – Kuala Lumpur	From Kuala Lumpur only
KLIA T1			2604A	Kompleks Bunga Raya I/C	Kompleks Bunga Raya (VIP Airport Complex)	From Kuala Lumpur only
KLIA T1			2605	Jalan KLIA 1 I/C	FT 182 Jalan KLIA 1 – KLIA Charter Field Town (KLIA Town Centre), Concorde Inn KLIA	From Kuala Lumpur only
KLIA T1			2606A	Jalan CTA 3 I/C	Jalan CTA 3 – KLIA Charter Field Town (KLIA Town Centre), Helipad, Main car park Jalan CTA 4 – KLIA control tower, Main car park, Car rental, Bus, Taxi and Motorcycles, Hotel Sama-Sama (Formerly Pan Pacific KLIA)	Half diamond interchange From Kuala Lumpur only
KLIA T1			2606B	Jalan CTA 2 Exit	Jalan CTA 2 – Main car park, Car rental, Bus, Taxi and Motorcycles	Half diamond interchange From Kuala Lumpur only
KLIA T1			2607	Putrajaya–Cyberjaya Expressway I/C	FT 29 Putrajaya–Cyberjaya Expressway – Putrajaya, Cyberjaya, Puchong, Salak Tinggi	From Kuala Lumpur only Under planning
KLIA T1				KLIA Airport Administration Office	KLIA Airport Administration Office – Malaysia Airport (Sepang) Sdn Bhd office, Malaysia Airlines (MAB) office, KLIA Fire Station, Air Disaster Unit (ADU)	From Kuala Lumpur only
KLIA T1				Main Terminal Building (East)	Upper Level – Departure Level; Lower Level – Arrival Level, Taxi and Bus Stop Level	From Kuala Lumpur only
KLIA T1				Main Terminal Building (West)	Jalan CTA 2 – Main car park, Car rental, Hotel Sama-Sama (Formerly Pan Pacific KLIA)	From KLIA Main Terminal Building only
KLIA T1				U-Turn	FT 26 – KLIA (Main Terminal Building), Kompleks Bunga Raya (VIP Airport Complex)	From KLIA Main Terminal Building only
KLIA T1			2604B	Madani Expressway	FT 26 Madani Expressway – Kuala Lumpur; Elevated U Turn to KLIA 2 FT 26 Madani Expressway (KLIA 2 Section) – Kuala Lumpur International Airport 2 (klia2), Main Terminal Building, Gateway @ klia2, Main car park	Continued to the dual carriageway
1.000 mi = 1.609 km; 1.000 km = 0.621 mi: Proposed

=== KLIA 2 Section ===
==== One way single carriageway section ====
Location	km	mi	Exit	Name	Destinations	Notes
KLIA T2			From the original section of the route FT26			
KLIA T2			KLIA canal bridge			
KLIA T2				Main Terminal Building (East); Gateway @ klia2	Bus and Taxi Airport Level – Bus and Taxi Level; Upper Level – Departure Level, Main car park Middle Level – Arrival Level, Main car park Lower Level – Tune Hotel klia2, Main car park, Car Rental, Bus, Taxi and Motorcycles	From Kuala Lumpur only
KLIA T2				Main Terminal Building (West); Gateway @ klia2		From klia2 Main Terminal Building only
KLIA T2				klia2 Car Park	klia2 Car Park – Tune Hotel klia2, Main car park, Car rental, Bus, Taxi and Motorcycles	From klia2 Main Terminal Building only Future car park
KLIA T2			KLIA canal bridge			
KLIA T2			2604D; 2604A	KLIA 2 I/C	FT 26 Madani Expressway (original section) – Kuala Lumpur; U-Turn – KLIA T1 – Main Terminal Building, Main car park Kompleks Bunga Raya (VIP Airport Complex)	Interchange from/to Kuala Lumpur
1.000 mi = 1.609 km; 1.000 km = 0.621 mi: Proposed

== See also ==
- Kuala Lumpur International Airport (KLIA)
- KLIA Outer Ring Road
- Jalan KLIA 1
- KLIA East Road
