= Southville =

Southville may refer to one of several locations:

- Southville, Bristol, England
- Southville City, a township in Bangi, Selangor, Malaysia
- Southville, Kentucky, United States
- Southville, Massachusetts, a village within the town of Southborough, United States
- Southville, Nova Scotia, Canada
