= Malaysia Federal Route 31 =

Road in Malaysia

Federal Route 31
- Jalan Banting–Semenyih

Route information
- Maintained by Malaysian Public Works Department
- Length: 45.8 km (28.5 mi)

Major junctions
- West end: Teluk Datok
- FT 5 Klang–Banting Highway; West Coast Expressway; FT 32 Federal Route 32; FT 248 Federal Route 248; FT 29 Putrajaya–Cyberjaya Expressway; FT 214 Federal Route 214; B13 State Route B13; B48 State Route B48; North–South Expressway Southern Route; B17 State Route B17; B24 State Route B24; Kajang–Seremban Highway; FT 1 Federal Route 1
- East end: Semenyih

Location
- Country: Malaysia
- Primary destinations: Banting, Jugra, Morib, Putrajaya, Cyberjaya, Dengkil, Jenderam Hilir, Southville City, Bandar Baru Bangi, Kajang, Bangi

Highway system
- Highways in Malaysia; Expressways; Federal; State

Federal Route 31, Jalan Banting–Semenyih or Jalan Bangi (formerly Selangor State Route B18), is a federal road in Selangor, Malaysia. The 45.8 km (28.5 mi) road connects Teluk Datok, Kuala Langat in the west to Semenyih, Hulu Langat in the east.

== Route Background ==
The Kilometre Zero is located at Semenyih.

== History ==
In 2011, the road was gazetted as the federal road by JKR as Federal Route 31.

== Features ==
At most sections, the Federal Route 31 was built under the JKR R5 road standard, with a speed limit of 90 km/h (56 mph).

== Junction lists ==
The entire route is located in Selangor.

Legend:

- I/C - Interchange, I/S - Intersection, RSA - Rest and service area, OBR - Overhead bridge restaurant, R/R - Restaurant and rest plaza, L/B - Layby, V/P - Vista point, TN - tunnel, T/P - Toll plaza, BR - Bridge
- C - Cloverleaf, S - Stack, T-A - Trumpet-A, T-B - Trumpet-B, DT - Directional-T/Y, SDT - Semi-Directional-T/Y, P-Y - Partial-Y, D - Diamond, P-C - Partial cloverleaf, D-D - Diverging diamond, D-R - Direct ramp

District	km	Exit	Name	Destinations	Notes
Kuala Langat	45.8	I/S	Teluk Datok	FT 5 Klang–Banting Highway – Klang, Jenjarom, Pulau Carey, Telok Panglima Garang, Banting, Jugra, Morib	T-junction
Kuala Langat			Kampung Sungai Manggis	Taman Sungai Manggis	
Kuala Langat		I/C	WCE-Banting	West Coast Expressway – Kapar, Meru, Pulau Indah, Klang, Shah Alam, Putrajaya, Kuala Lumpur, Ipoh, Penang, Alor Setar	Trumpet interchange
Kuala Langat			Taman Bakti Manggis	Taman Bakti Manggis	T-junctions
Kuala Langat			Kampung Sungai Lempit	Kampung Sungai Lempit	T-junctions
Kuala Langat		I/C	Tanjung Dua Belas	FT 32 Malaysia Federal Route 32 – Kuala Lumpur International Airport (KLIA), Salak Tinggi, Nilai; North–South Expressway Central Link / AH2 – Kuala Lumpur, Johor Bahru	Trumpet interchange
Kuala Langat			Kampung Bukit Changgang	FT 248 Malaysia Federal Route 248 – Kampung Bukit Changgang	T-junctions
Kuala Langat			Kampung Kubang Beras		
Kuala Langat			Kampung Lenang	Paya Indah Wetlands, Taman Paya Indah	Junctions
Sepang			Oil palm mill		
Sepang			Dengkil	FT 214 Jalan Putrajaya–Dengkil – Putrajaya	T-junctions
Sepang		BR	Sungai Langat bridge		
Sepang			Dengkil East	FT 29 Putrajaya–Cyberjaya Expressway – Putrajaya, Cyberjaya, Puchong, Petaling Jaya, Kuala Lumpur International Airport (KLIA), Salak Tinggi, Nilai	Diamond interchange
Sepang			Kampung Ambar Tenang		
Sepang			Kampung Jalan Bahru		
Sepang			Jenderam Hilir		
Sepang			Kampung Tanjong	B13 Selangor State Route B13 – Bangi, Kajang, Salak Tinggi	T-junctions
Sepang			Jalan Besar Salak	B48 Selangor State Route B48 – Salak Tinggi, Sepang, Nilai, Kuala Lumpur International Airport (KLIA), Sepang F1 Circuit	T-junctions
Sepang			Kampung Bukit Piatu		
Sepang			Kampung Sungai Buah		
Sepang		BR	Sungai Semenyih bridge		
Sepang			Southville City-NSE Road	Southville City-NSE Road – Southville City; North–South Expressway Southern Route – Kuala Lumpur, Petaling Jaya, Kuala Lumpur International Airport (KLIA), Seremban, Malacca, Johor Bahru	T-junctions
Hulu Langat			Jalan Reko	B17 Selangor State Route B17 – Bandar Baru Bangi, Kajang, Universiti Kebangsaan Malaysia (UKM), Malaysian Nuclear Agency; North–South Expressway Southern Route – Kuala Lumpur, Petaling Jaya, Kuala Lumpur International Airport (KLIA), Seremban, Malacca, Johor Bahru	T-junction
Hulu Langat			Kampung Bahagia		
Hulu Langat			Bangi	Jalan Bangi Lama – Bangi town centre	T-junctions
Hulu Langat		BR	Railway crossing bridge		
Hulu Langat			Bangi	Jalan Bangi Lama – Bangi town centre Jalan Mahkota 1 – Bandar Bukit Mahkota, Bandar Seri Putra; North–South Expressway Southern Route – Kuala Lumpur, Petaling Jaya, Kuala Lumpur International Airport (KLIA), Seremban, Malacca, Johor Bahru	T-junctions
Hulu Langat			Bangi Estate		
Hulu Langat			Kampung Batu Lima Bangi		
Hulu Langat			Jalan Enam Kaki	B24 Selangor State Route B24 – Beranang, Mantin, Seremban	T-junctions
Hulu Langat			Semenyih-LEKAS	Kajang–Seremban Highway – Kuala Lumpur, Kajang, Pajam, Seremban	T-junctions
Hulu Langat			Kampung Batu Tiga Jalan Bangi		
Hulu Langat			Taman Kim Lai		
Hulu Langat			Taman Semenyih Jaya		
Hulu Langat			Taman Semenyih Sentral		
Hulu Langat	0.0	I/S	Semenyih	FT 1 Malaysia Federal Route 1 – Kajang, Kuala Lumpur, Mantin, Seremban	T-junctions
