= Malaysia Federal Route 343 =

Road in Malaysia

Federal Route 343
- Jalan Pekeliling 4

Route information
- Maintained by Malaysian Public Works Department
- Length: 0.5 km (0.31 mi; 1,600 ft)
- Existed: 1995–present
- History: Completed in 1997

Major junctions
- West end: KLIA Outer Ring Road
- FT 27 KLIA Outer Ring Road
- East end: Malaysian Ministry of Agriculture Quarantine Complex

Location
- Country: Malaysia

Highway system
- Highways in Malaysia; Expressways; Federal; State

Jalan Pekeliling 4, Federal Route 343, is a federal road in the Kuala Lumpur International Airport (KLIA), Malaysia.

The Kilometre Zero is located at KLIA Outer Ring Road junctions.

At most sections, the Federal Route 343 was built under the JKR R5 road standard, allowing maximum speed limit of up to 90 km/h.

== Junction lists ==
The entire route is located in Sepang District, Selangor.

Legend:

- I/C - Interchange, I/S - Intersection, RSA - Rest and service area, OBR - Overhead bridge restaurant, R/R - Restaurant and rest plaza, L/B - Layby, V/P - Vista point, TN - tunnel, T/P - Toll plaza, BR - Bridge
- C - Cloverleaf, S - Stack, T-A - Trumpet-A, T-B - Trumpet-B, DT - Directional-T/Y, SDT - Semi-Directional-T/Y, P-Y - Partial-Y, D - Diamond, P-C - Partial cloverleaf, D-D - Diverging diamond, D-R - Direct ramp

Location	km	Name	Destinations	Notes
KLIA	0.0	KLIA Outer Ring Road	FT 27 KLIA Outer Ring Road – Kuala Lumpur International Airport (KLIA), Banting, Sepang, Sepang International Circuit, Cargo terminal North–South Expressway Central Link / AH2 – Kuala Lumpur, Johor Bahru	T-junctions
KLIA	0.5	Malaysian Ministry of Agriculture Quarantine Complex	Custom and Excise Depot Centre (Customs Detention Centre) – Veterinary Centre, FAMA Complex, Fisheries Quarantine Centre	Restricted area
1.000 mi = 1.609 km; 1.000 km = 0.621 mi: Incomplete access
