= Malaysia Federal Route 342 =

Road in Malaysia

Federal Route 342
- Jalan Pekeliling 3

Route information
- Maintained by Malaysian Public Works Department
- Length: 0.5 km (0.31 mi; 1,600 ft)
- Existed: 1995–present
- History: Completed in 1997

Major junctions
- West end: KLIA Outer Ring Road
- FT 27 KLIA Outer Ring Road; FT 344 KLIA East Road
- North end: KLIA East Road

Location
- Country: Malaysia

Highway system
- Highways in Malaysia; Expressways; Federal; State

Jalan Pekeliling 3, Federal Route 342, is a federal road in the Kuala Lumpur International Airport (KLIA), Malaysia.

The Kilometre Zero is located at KLIAORR junctions.

At most sections, the Federal Route 343 was built under the JKR R5 road standard, with a speed limit of 90 km/h.

== Junction lists ==
The entire route is located in Sepang District, Selangor.

Legend:

- I/C - Interchange, I/S - Intersection, RSA - Rest and service area, OBR - Overhead bridge restaurant, R/R - Restaurant and rest plaza, L/B - Layby, V/P - Vista point, TN - tunnel, T/P - Toll plaza, BR - Bridge
- C - Cloverleaf, S - Stack, T-A - Trumpet-A, T-B - Trumpet-B, DT - Directional-T/Y, SDT - Semi-Directional-T/Y, P-Y - Partial-Y, D - Diamond, P-C - Partial cloverleaf, D-D - Diverging diamond, D-R - Direct ramp

Location	km	mi	Name	Destinations	Notes
KLIA			Through to Jalan Pekeliling 3A		
KLIA	0.0	0.0	KLIA Outer Ring Road	FT 27 KLIA Outer Ring Road – Kuala Lumpur International Airport (KLIA), Cargo terminal, Banting, Sepang; North–South Expressway Central Link / AH2 – Kuala Lumpur, Johor Bahru	T-junctions
KLIA			Sepang International Circuit	Sepang International Circuit – Main grandstand, National Automotive Museum	
KLIA			Malaysian Aviation Academy (MAA)		
KLIA			Sepang International Circuit	Sepang International Circuit	
KLIA	0.5	0.31	KLIA East Road	FT 344 KLIA East Road (Jalan Kuaraters) – Kuala Lumpur International Airport (KLIA); North–South Expressway Central Link / AH2 – Kuala Lumpur, Johor Bahru	West Only
1.000 mi = 1.609 km; 1.000 km = 0.621 mi: Incomplete access; Route transition
