= Setia Eco Glades =

Township in Selangor, Malaysia

- Township
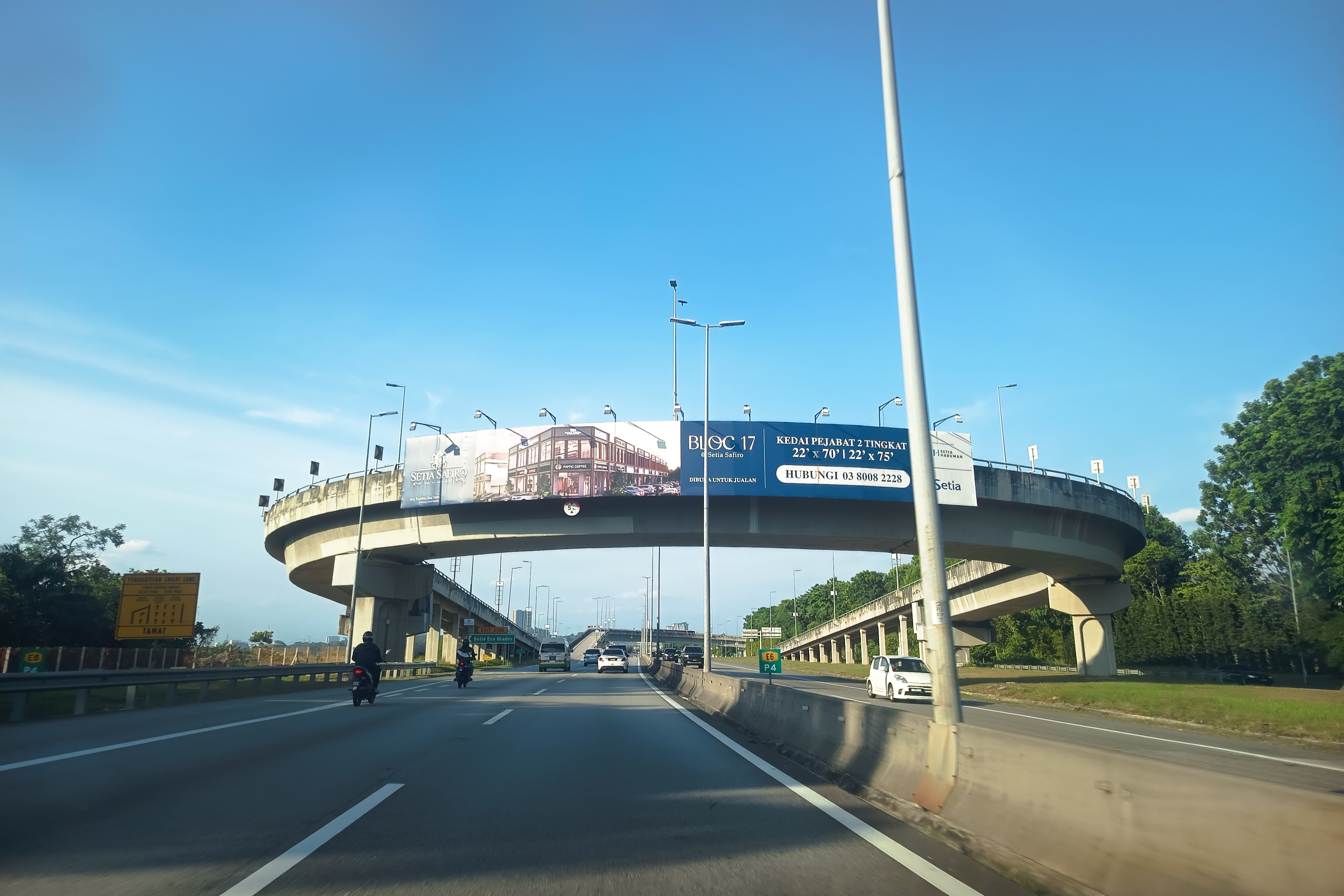
- Interchange of Setia Eco Glades from the Putrajaya Link

- Logo
- Interactive map of Setia Eco Glades
- Coordinates: 2°56′20.8″N 101°38′01.0″E
- Country: Malaysia
- State: Selangor
- District: Sepang
- Mukim: Dengkil
- Launched: 2012
- Founder: SP Setia Berhad

Government
  - Local government: Sepang Municipal Council

Area
  - Total: 108 ha (268 acres)
- Elevation: 20 m (66 ft)
- Time zone: UTC+8 (MST)
  - Summer (DST): Not observed
- Postcode: 63000
- Website: Official website

Setia Eco Glades is a 268 acres (108 ha) township located in Cyberjaya, Sepang district, Selangor, Malaysia. The township was launched in 2012 by SP Setia Berhad.

The postcode used in Setia Eco Glades is 63000 Cyberjaya.

== Administration ==
Setia Eco Glades is located within Mukim Dengkil, which is one of the three mukims in the Sepang district. Apart from that, Setia Eco Glades is located under the administration of the Sepang Municipal Council (MPSepang), where it is in the Cyberjaya Zone of MPSepang.

== Geography ==
Setia Eco Glades is located at an attitude of 20 m (66 ft) above sea level.

There is a lake in the middle of the township.

== Amenities ==
There is a surau in the township, namely Surau Setia Eco Glades. Right next to the surau, there is a football pitch.

Other than that, Setia Eco Glades has a Petron gas station located at the south of the surau.

Adjacent to the township, there is a recreational park covering an area of 86 acres (35 ha), namely Cyberjaya Lake Park.

== Transport ==
=== Expressways ===
Setia Eco Glades is accessible through these 4 main expressways.

- North–South Expressway Central Link (ELITE)
- Maju Expressway (MEX)
- Damansara–Puchong Expressway (LDP)
- South Klang Valley Expressway (SKVE)

=== Public transportation ===
PY40 Cyberjaya City Centre MRT Station is the closest rail station to Setia Eco Glades by distance.
