= Kampung Bukit Lanchong =

Village in Petaling, Selangor, Malaysia

Coordinates: 2°59′N 101°33′E

- Village
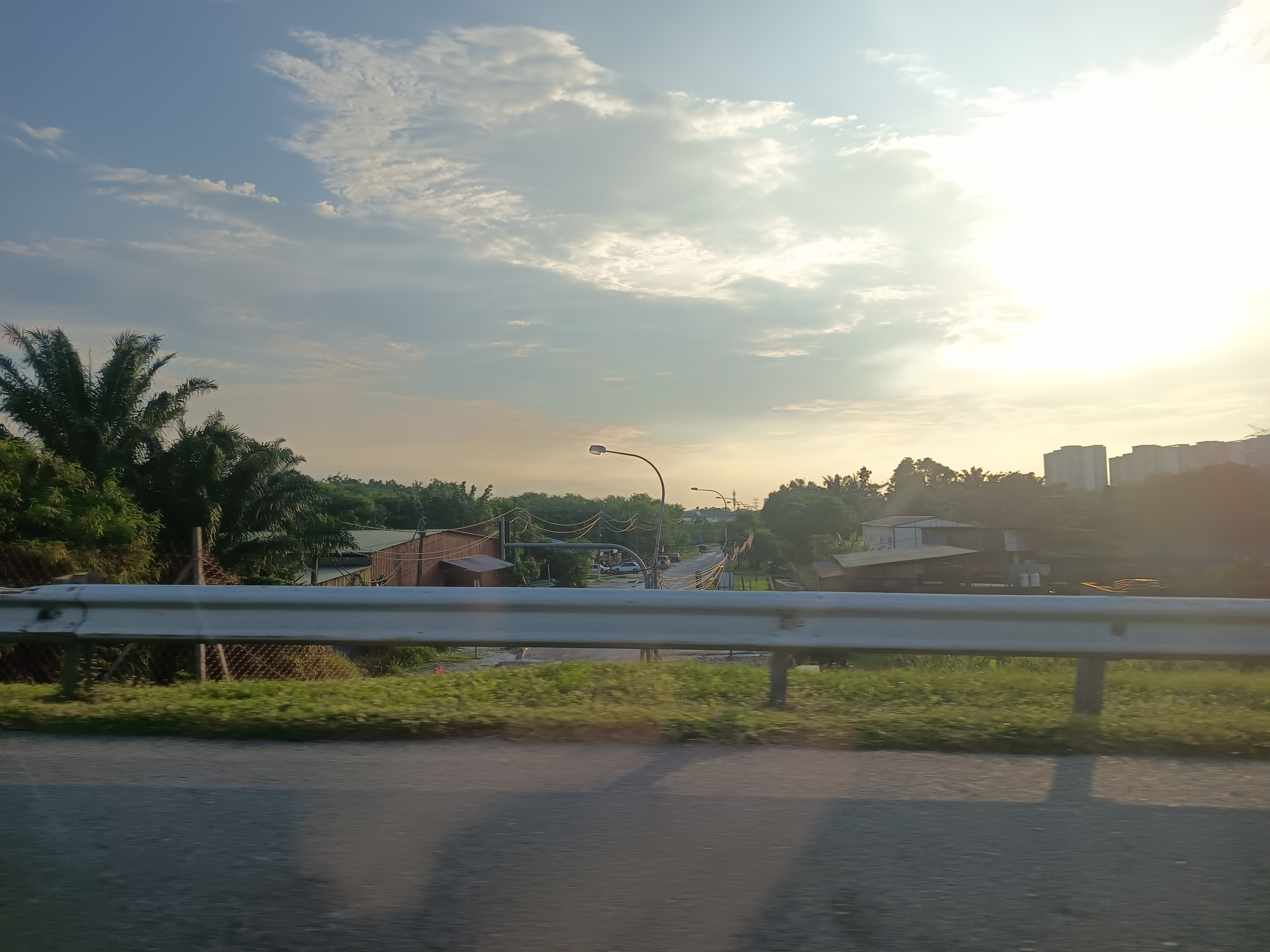
- Kampung Bukit Lanchong from North–South Expressway Central Link
- Interactive map of Kampung Bukit Lanchong
- Country: Malaysia
- State: Selangor
- District: Petaling
- Time zone: UTC+8 (MST)
  - Summer (DST): Not observed

Kampung Bukit Lanchong is a small village in Subang Jaya, Selangor, Malaysia. The village is located between Puchong, UEP Subang Jaya (USJ), Putra Heights, Alam Megah (HICOM), Kota Kemuning and Bandar Saujana Putra. It is currently administered by the Subang Jaya City Council (MBSJ).
