= Selangor State Route B24 =

Road in Malaysia

Selangor Route 24
- Jalan Enam Kaki

Major junctions
- West end: Bangi
- FT 31 Federal Route 31; FT 1 Federal Route 1
- East end: Beranang

Location
- Country: Malaysia
- Primary destinations: Kampung Sungai Kembong, Kampung Jalan Enam Kaki

Highway system
- Highways in Malaysia; Expressways; Federal; State

Selangor State Route B24, Jalan Enam Kaki (Six Feet Road) is a major road in Selangor, Malaysia.

== Junction list ==
The entire route is located in Hulu Langat District, Selangor.

Legend:

- I/C - Interchange, I/S - Intersection, RSA - Rest and service area, OBR - Overhead bridge restaurant, R/R - Restaurant and rest plaza, L/B - Layby, V/P - Vista point, TN - tunnel, T/P - Toll plaza, BR - Bridge
- C - Cloverleaf, S - Stack, T-A - Trumpet-A, T-B - Trumpet-B, DT - Directional-T/Y, SDT - Semi-Directional-T/Y, P-Y - Partial-Y, D - Diamond, P-C - Partial cloverleaf, D-D - Diverging diamond, D-R - Direct ramp

| Location | km | mi | Name | Destinations | Notes |
|---|---|---|---|---|---|
| Bangi | | | Bangi | FT 31 Malaysia Federal Route 31 – Bangi, Dengkil, Banting, Semenyih, Kajang | |
| Bangi | | | Semenyih River bridge | | |
| Bangi | | | Kampung Rinching Hilir | | |
| Bangi | | | Kampung Sungai Kembong Hilir | Jalan Sungai Kembong Hilir – Kampung Sungai Kembong Hilir | |
| Bangi | | | Kampong Sungai Kembong Ulu Bangi | | |
| Beranang | | | Beranang River bridge | | |
| Beranang | | | Kampung Kuala Pajam | | |
| Beranang | | | Kampung Jalan Enam Kaki | | |
| Beranang | | | Beranang | FT 1 Malaysia Federal Route 1 – Semenyih, Kajang, Kuala Lumpur, Mantin, Seremban | T-junctions |
1.000 mi = 1.609 km; 1.000 km = 0.621 mi
