= Selangor State Route B48 =

Road in Malaysia

Selangor Route 48
- Jalan Besar Salak; Jalan Jenderam–Sepang
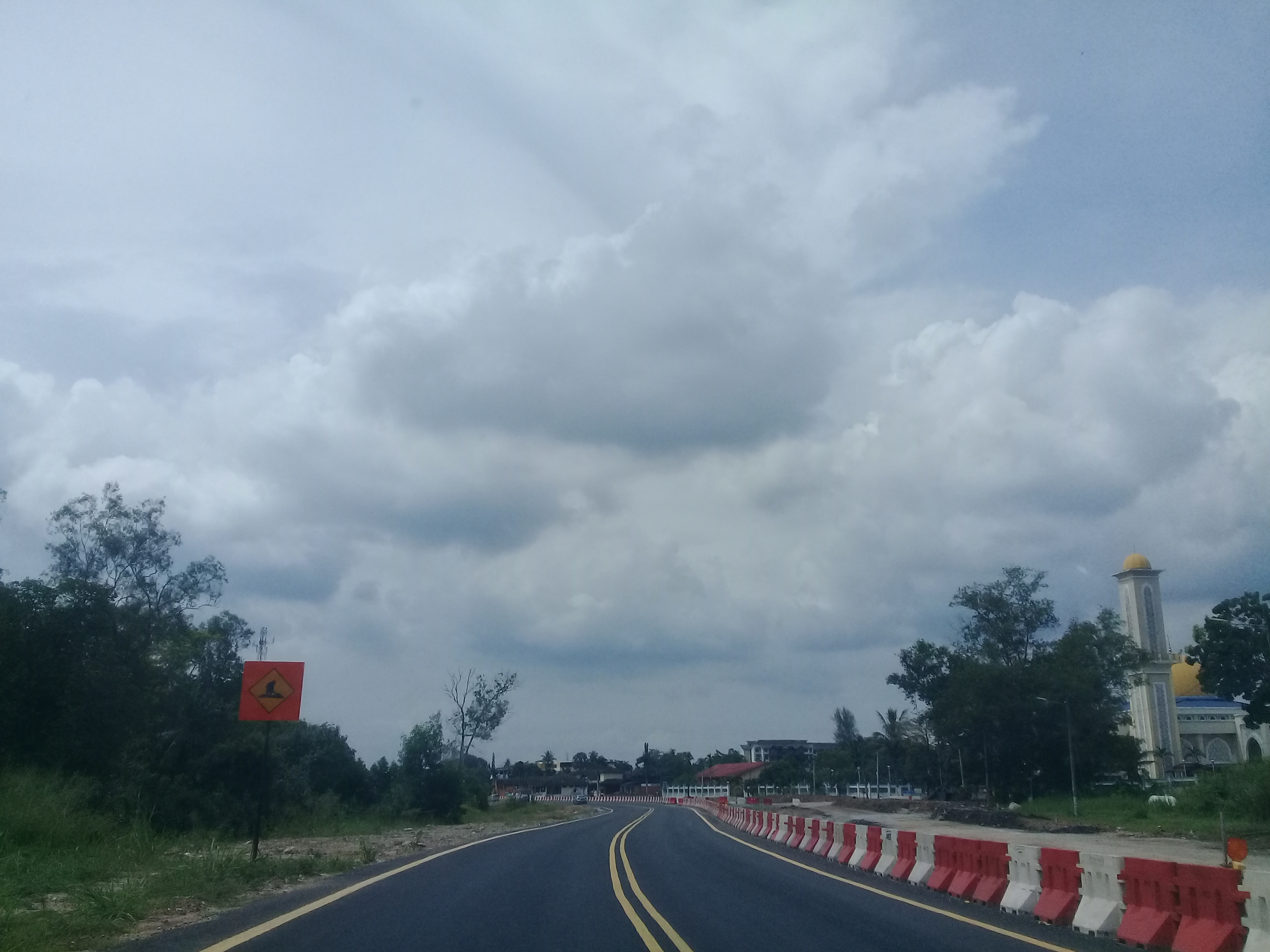
- Jalan Besar Salak

Route information
- Length: 24.0 km (14.9 mi)

Major junctions
- North end: Dengkil
- FT 31 Federal Route 31; FT 32 Federal Route 32; FT 3265 Federal Route 3265; FT 344 Federal Route 344; FT 1266 Federal Route 1266; FT 5 Federal Route 5
- South end: Sepang

Location
- Country: Malaysia
- Primary destinations: Putrajaya, Salak Tinggi, Nilai, Salak, Sungai Pelek, Port Dickson

Highway system
- Highways in Malaysia; Expressways; Federal; State

Selangor State Route B48, Jalan Besar Salak and Jalan Jenderam–Sepang is a major road in Selangor, Malaysia.

== Route background ==
The Kilometre Zero of Jalan Besar Salak starts at Sepang town, at its interchange with the Federal Route 5, the main trunk road of the west coast of Peninsular Malaysia.

== History ==
=== Road upgrade project ===
The scope of the project is upgrade the Jalan Jenderam–Sepang B48 into dual carriageway, two lanes each directions, set up U-turn and new sections.

The State Route B48 upgrade project initially start in 2016 and expected completed in 2020, however the project started in 2018 and still ongoing. The involved sections are about 13 km (8.1 mi). The project is handled by two contractors, however only one contractor completed its responsibility parts, another one contractor is "missing", leading to the delay of the project. A part of that, the construction site is also lacking of the safety measures and no street lights, making the road become more dangerous in night.

In April and May 2024, the project is restarted, including build institu Box Culvert, footbridge, resurfaces, upgrade watering system and Jersey barrier installation.

The State Assemblyman of Selangor State Legislative Assembly for Sungai Pelek, Lwi Kian Keong always follow up with Public Works Department about the progress of the project, and also asking in the State Legislative Assembly.

== Features ==
At most sections, the Selangor State Route B48 was built under the JKR R5 road standard, allowing maximum speed limit of up to 90 km/h (56 mph).

- Cow farmers along this state road

There are no alternate routes or sections with motorcycle lanes.

== Junction lists ==
The entire route is located in Sepang District, Selangor.

Location	km	mi	Name	Destinations	Notes
Dengkil	24.0	14.9	Dengkil; Kampung Bukit Piatu	FT 31 Malaysia Federal Route 31 – Banting, Dengkil, Putrajaya, Cyberjaya, Semenyih, Bangi, Kajang	T-junctions
Dengkil			Kampung Seberang		
Dengkil			Brook Side Estate		
Salak Tinggi			MiGHT	Malaysian Industry-Government Group for High Technology (MiGHT)	T-junctions
Salak Tinggi			Salak Tinggi; Bandar Baru Salak Tinggi	Jalan Bandar Baru Salak Tinggi – Bandar Baru Salak Tinggi, Masjid Sultan Hishamuddin, Stadium PUAS	T-junctions
Salak Tinggi			De Palma Hotel		
Salak Tinggi			Wisma Persekutuan Salak Tinggi		
Salak Tinggi			Salak Tinggi	FT 32 Malaysia Federal Route 32 – Kuala Lumpur International Airport (KLIA), Putrajaya, Cyberjaya, Banting, Bandar Baru Nilai, Nilai; North–South Expressway Southern Route / AH2 – Kuala Lumpur, Seremban, Johor Bahru	Diamond interchange
Salak Tinggi			Sungai Labu bridge		
Salak Tinggi			Salak	FT 3265 Malaysia Federal Route 3265 – Nilai, Pajam, Sepang Road	T-junctions
Salak Tinggi			Kampung Lembah Paya Busut		
Salak Tinggi			Kampung Lembah Paya		
Salak Tinggi			KLIA East Road	FT 344 KLIA East Road (Jalan Kuarters KLIA) – Kuala Lumpur International Airport (KLIA), Kuala Lumpur, Sepang International Circuit, KLIA Quarters, Bandar Enstek, Kota Seriemas	Junctions
Salak Tinggi			Sungai Chinchang bridge		
Sepang			Jalan FELDA L.B. Johnson	FT 1266 Malaysia Federal Route 1266 – FELDA L.B. Johnson, Labu	T-junctions
Sepang			Taman Desa Indah		
Sepang			Masjid Pekan Sepang		
Sepang	0.0	0.0	Sepang	FT 5 Malaysia Federal Route 5 – Banting, Morib, Bagan Lalang, Sungai Pelek, Lukut, Seremban, Port Dickson; Old FT5 Route – Town centre	Junctions
1.000 mi = 1.609 km; 1.000 km = 0.621 mi
