= Peninsula Gas Utilisation =

Pipeline in Malaysia

Coordinates: 3.0293°N 101.5653°E

The Peninsular Gas Utilization (PGU) is the longest pipeline in Malaysia. The 2,623 km (1,630 mi) pipeline transports sales gas to power sectors, petrochemical plants, and industries across Peninsular Malaysia, including exports to Singapore, with four entry points: Kertih, Pengerang, Sungai Udang, and Thailand. It is owned and operated by Petronas Gas Berhad on behalf of its holding company Petronas.

The PGU project is an integral part of Malaysia’s economic development. Between 1983 and 1992, Malaysia's domestic demand for gas grew by an average of 13.82% annually, largely driven by the PGU project, which enabled the government's push to diversify from a commodity exporter to an export-oriented manufacturing hub by ensuring access to abundant low-cost shallow water gas. The PGU was, at one point, also envisioned as a potential driver of the nation's natural gas vehicle sector.

Today, gas is one of the most widely used fuels in Malaysia especially to generate electricity and is supplied as feedstock for the petrochemical industry.

== History ==
In 1981, PETRONAS commissioned a Gas Master Plan Study to formulate plans to maximise the use of natural gas for the benefit of Malaysia's economy. One of the key recommendations of the Study was to put in place a gas transmission grid for Peninsular Malaysia.

The PGU Project was carried out in three phases beginning in 1984 and completed in 2001. The three phases are:

=== Phase I: Tok Arun - Kerteh ===
Phase I, completed in mid-1984, included the first Gas Processing Plant (GPP1) in Kerteh, an export terminal and a 32-km pipeline from GPP1 to the export terminal. The gas processing plant cost RM 500 million. It was jointly managed by Jurutera Konsultant (South-east Asia) Sdn Bhd and Stone of the United States.

=== Phase II: West and South Peninsular Malaysia ===
Phase II, completed in 1992, extended the pipeline to the western and southern parts of Peninsular Malaysia as well as Singapore. Under this phase, three more GPPs were built. A compressor station and an operation centre were also built in Segamat. The construction of this phase originally began in July 1988. The project was managed by Novacorp of Canada and the main contractor was MMC Entrepose.

=== Phase III: Sector 1 (Meru to Lumut), Sector 2 & 3 (Lumut to Arau, Perlis) ===
Phase III, completed in 1998, saw the PGU pipeline extend northwards along the West Coast from Meru, Klang to Arau, Perlis. A lateral line to Lumut and another lateral line to Gurun were also installed. Two more GPPs were also added under this phase. The Detail Engineering for the pipeline and the Project Management for the GPPs and also the pipeline were done by OGP Technical Services Sdn Bhd. The API 5L with 3LPP coated carbon steel, line pipes used was manufactured and supplied by HICOM Petropipe in Gurun. The main contractor appointed was Saipem Peremba JV. Studies for Phase 3 began in April 1991, with construction beginning in 1994.

== Features ==
- 2,500 kilometers of pipeline.
- A SCADA system to monitor and remotely control gas pressure and any valve stations.
- Pipeline operation centre is located at Segamat with the regional offices in Kuantan Pahang, Seremban Negeri Sembilan, Shah Alam Selangor and Sitiawan Perak.
