= Malaysia Federal Route 214 =

Road in Malaysia

Federal Route 214
- Jalan Putrajaya–Dengkil

Route information
- Maintained by Malaysian Public Works Department
- Length: 3.50 km (2.17 mi)

Major junctions
- North end: Kampung Dato' Aminuddin intersections
- FT 29 Putrajaya–Cyberjaya Expressway; FT 31 Federal Route 31
- South end: Dengkil

Location
- Country: Malaysia
- Primary destinations: Cyber Valley, Kampung Dato Ahmad Razali

Highway system
- Highways in Malaysia; Expressways; Federal; State

Jalan Putrajaya–Dengkil or Jalan Dengkil, Federal Route 214 (formerly Selangor State Route B15) is a dual-carriageway federal road in Selangor, Malaysia. The kilometre zero of the Federal Route 214 starts at Dengkil.

== History ==
In 2012, the road was gazetted as the federal roads by JKR as Federal Route 214.

== Features ==
At most sections, the Federal Route 214 was built under the JKR R5 road standard, allowing maximum speed limit of up to 90 km/h.

== Junction lists ==
The entire route is located in Sepang District, Selangor.

Legend:

- I/C - Interchange, I/S - Intersection, RSA - Rest and service area, OBR - Overhead bridge restaurant, R/R - Restaurant and rest plaza, L/B - Layby, V/P - Vista point, TN - tunnel, T/P - Toll plaza, BR - Bridge
- C - Cloverleaf, S - Stack, T-A - Trumpet-A, T-B - Trumpet-B, DT - Directional-T/Y, SDT - Semi-Directional-T/Y, P-Y - Partial-Y, D - Diamond, P-C - Partial cloverleaf, D-D - Diverging diamond, D-R - Direct ramp

Location	km	mi	Name	Destinations	Notes
Dengkil			Kampung Dato' Aminuddin I/S	FT 29 Putrajaya–Cyberjaya Expressway – Cyberjaya, Kuala Lumpur, Petaling Jaya, Subang Jaya, Shah Alam	LILO
Dengkil			Kampung Dato' Aminuddin	Jalan P5 – Kampung Dato Aminuddin, Putrajaya	T-junctions
Dengkil			Taman Selatan	Taman Selatan (Precinct 20) – Hindu cemetery, Christian cemetery, General cemetery, Buddhist cemetery, Muslim cemetery, Pusara Negarawan	T-junctions
Dengkil			Cyber Valley	Cyber Valley	T-junctions
Dengkil			Kampung Dato' Ahmad Razali	Kampung Dato' Ahmad Razali	T-junctions
Dengkil			Taman Dengkil Jaya	Taman Dengkil Jaya	T-junctions
Dengkil			Taman Nilam	Taman Nilam	T-junctions
Dengkil			Taman Desa Dengkil	Taman Desa Dengkil	T-junctions
Dengkil			Taman Mutiara	Taman Mutiara	T-junctions
Dengkil			Taman Kristal	Taman Kristal	T-junctions
Dengkil			Taman Baiduri	Taman Baiduri	T-junctions
Dengkil			Dengkil		
Dengkil	0.0	0.0	Dengkil I/S	FT 31 Malaysia Federal Route 31 – Banting, Klang, Semenyih, Bangi, Sepang, Salak Tinggi, Kuala Lumpur International Airport (KLIA)	3-way intersections
1.000 mi = 1.609 km; 1.000 km = 0.621 mi: Incomplete access
