= Southville City =

Township in Malaysia

Coordinates: 2.9030841°N 101.7624552°E

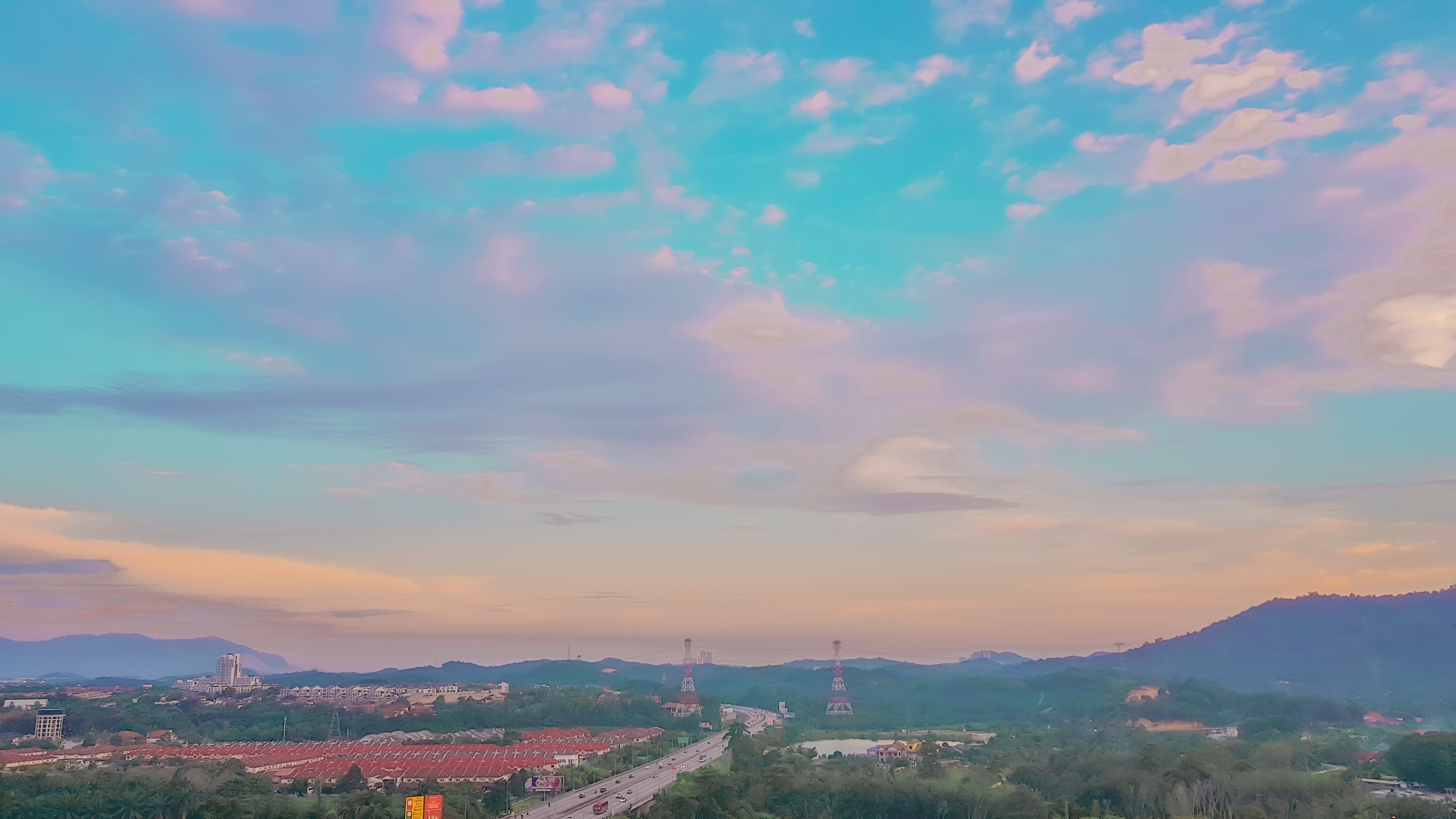
Southville City

Southville City (Malay: Bandar Baru Lembah Selatan, is a township in Dengkil, Sepang District, Selangor, Malaysia. This township is located about 25 km from Kuala Lumpur city centre and near to Bangi. The township is developed by the Mah Sing Group.
