= North–South Expressway Central Link =

Turnpike connecting two interstate turnpikes in Malaysia

Expressway 6
- North–South Expressway Central Link; Lebuhraya Utara–Selatan Lingkaran Tengah 南北大道第二中环衔接大道
- ELITE in red

Route information
- Part of AH2 (Entire route, Shah Alam–Nilai)
- Maintained by PLUS Expressways
- Length: 63 km (39 mi)
- Existed: 1994–present
- History: Completed in 1996, Putrajaya Link in 2000
- Component highways: Main link (Shah Alam–Nilai); Putrajaya Link (Putrajaya Interchange–Putrajaya); E6/FT26 KLIA Expressway (KLIA Interchange–Kuala Lumpur International Airport)

Major junctions
- Northwest end: New Klang Valley Expressway / AH2 / AH141 at Shah Alam, Selangor
- Guthrie Corridor Expressway; Shah Alam Expressway; Damansara–Puchong Expressway; South Klang Valley Expressway; FT 26 KLIA Expressway; FT 29 Putrajaya–Cyberjaya Expressway
- Southeast end: North–South Expressway Southern Route / AH2 at Nilai, Negeri Sembilan

Location
- Country: Malaysia
- Primary destinations: Shah Alam, Batu Tiga, UEP Subang Jaya, Putra Heights, Puchong, Bandar Saujana Putra, Cyberjaya, Putrajaya, Kuala Lumpur International Airport, Dengkil, Nilai

Highway system
- Highways in Malaysia; Expressways; Federal; State

The E6 North–South Expressway Central Link also known as ELITE, is a 63-kilometre (39-mile) controlled-access highway in Malaysia, running between Shah Alam in Selangor and Nilai in Negeri Sembilan. The expressway joins the separated northern and southern sections of the North–South Expressway, allowing interstate traffic to bypass Kuala Lumpur. The expressway also serves as a primary access route to Putrajaya and Kuala Lumpur International Airport.

== History ==
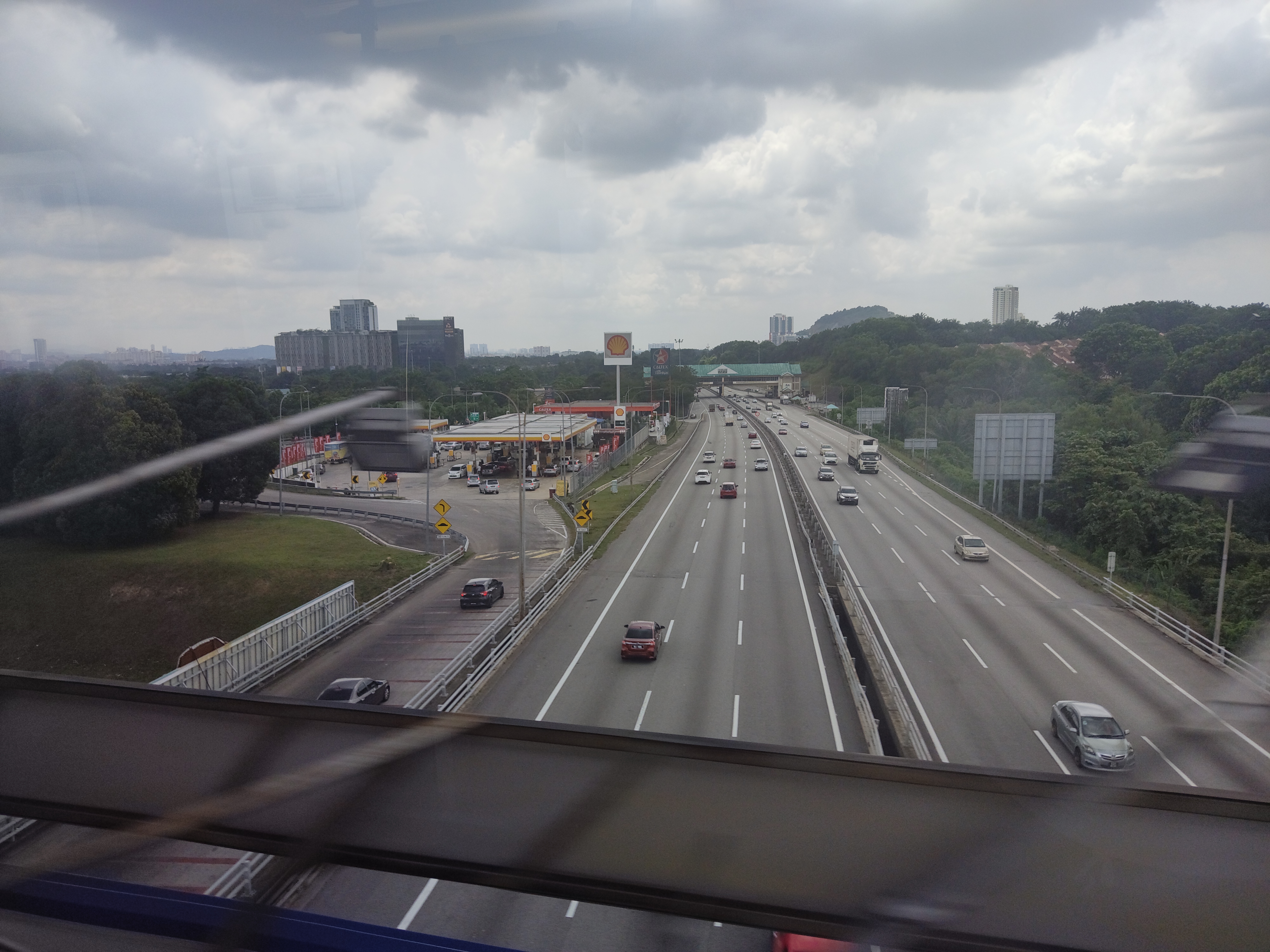
ELITE highway in UEP Subang Jaya

Then originally unnamed, the Central Link of the North-South Expressway was built by United Engineers Malaysia Berhad at a cost of RM 1 billion. The concession agreement was signed in April 1994. Construction would start in June 1994 and would be completed by August 1997. UEM would also use the expertise and staff of PLUS which was responsible for the completion of the North-South Expressway.

The first section, between Shah Alam and USJ, was opened in June 1996. In October 1997, the remainder of the expressway opened to traffic. The Putrajaya Link was opened in 2000.

In September 2003, the company Expressway Lingkaran Tengah Sdn Bhd (ELITE) became a member company of PLUS Expressways.

On 28 February 2013, a bridge being built by the Selangor State Development Corporation at the interchange to Bandar Nusaputra on the Putrajaya Link collapsed due to a water pipe leak. No casualties were reported.

== Features ==
- Closed toll system (refer to PLUS)
- Batu Tiga flyover, the longest flyover on the NSE network
- Act as bypass from bustling Kuala Lumpur travelling from north to south and vice versa
- Smooth access to KLIA
- PLUS Speedway (formerly ELITE Speedway) in USJ Rest and Service Area is the first highway go-kart circuit in Malaysia
- Safety CS Team (PROPEL) roadworks

=== Speed limit ===
North–South Expressway Central Link is designed as a high-speed long distance expressway therefore the default speed limit on the expressway is 110 km/h (68 mph), but there are some exceptions in some places for several reasons, including:-

- Shah Alam Interchange–USJ Interchange: 90 km/h (56 mph) (due to high traffic capacity) (Selangor)

== Toll system ==
ELITE operates using a closed toll system throughout its entire route, with toll plazas built at all access points. The toll rate for each vehicle is proportional to the distance between the vehicle's entry point and exit point.

ELITE integrates its toll collection system with New Klang Valley Expressway (NKVE) and the northern and southern routes of the North-South Expressway (NSE) up to their respective terminuses at Sungai Besi (NKVE-NSE Northern Route), Bukit Raja (ELITE-NKVE), Juru (ELITE-NSE Southern Route) and Skudai (NSE Southern Route). As such, vehicles traveling throughout the aforementioned expressway network will be charged with a toll rate equivalent to the sum of the rates calculated for each expressway.

Vehicles exiting ELITE to the aforementioned expressways will not pass through any toll plazas at the interchanges between the respective highways.

=== Fares (between Shah Alam and Bandar Serenia only) ===
(Since 1 February 2020)

Class	Type of vehicles	Rate (in Malaysian Ringgit (RM)) up to
0	Motorcycles (Vehicles with two axles and two wheels)	Free
1	Private Cars (Vehicles with two axles and three or four wheels (excluding taxis and buses))	4.59
2	Vans and other small goods vehicles (Vehicles with two axles and five or six wheels (excluding buses))	8.40
3	Large Trucks (Vehicles with three or more axles (excluding buses))	11.20
4	Taxis	2.30
5	Buses	3.44

=== Toll names ===
Abbreviation	Name
EBN	Ebor North
EBS	Ebor South
SEA	Seafield
USJ	USJ
PHT	Putra Heights
SPT	Saujana Putra
PTJ	Putrajaya
KLA	KLIA
DKL	Bandar Serenia
SLT	Salak Tinggi
BBN	Bandar Baru Nilai

== Interchange lists ==
Legend:

- I/C - Interchange, I/S - Intersection, RSA - Rest and service area, OBR - Overhead bridge restaurant, R/R - Restaurant and rest plaza, L/B - Layby, V/P - Vista point, TN - tunnel, T/P - Toll plaza, BR - Bridge
- C - Cloverleaf, S - Stack, T-A - Trumpet-A, T-B - Trumpet-B, DT - Directional-T/Y, SDT - Semi-Directional-T/Y, P-Y - Partial-Y, D - Diamond, P-C - Partial cloverleaf, D-D - Diverging diamond, D-R - Direct ramp

States	District	Km	Exit	Name	Destinations	Notes
Selangor	Petaling	0.0	601 103	Shah Alam I/C	New Klang Valley Expressway / AH2 / AH141 – Port Klang, Klang, Setia Alam, Subang, Damansara, Kuala Lumpur (Jalan Duta), Ipoh; Guthrie Corridor Expressway – Shah Alam, Bukit Jelutong, Sungai Buloh, Kuala Selangor, Rawang, Selayang	Dual trumpet interchange
Selangor	Petaling		BR	Batu Tiga flyover Railway crossing bridge Sungai Damansara bridge		Length: 2 km
Selangor	Petaling	4.3		Ebor I/C (North)		On-ramp to southbound only
Selangor	Petaling	4.5	602	Ebor I/C (South)	FT 286 Malaysia Federal Route 286 – HICOM, Shah Alam, Batu Tiga, i-City	Off-ramp from southbound only
Selangor	Petaling	5.3	603	Seafield I/C	Shah Alam Expressway – Pulau Indah, Klang, Kota Kemuning, Subang Jaya, Sri Petaling, Cheras, Kuantan	Trumpet interchange
Selangor	Petaling		OBR	USJ OBR & RSA	USJ OBR & RSA – Caltex, Mofaz Food Stop, MUFORS Gallery	Southbound, accessible from both directions
Selangor	Petaling		604	USJ I/C	Persiaran Kewajipan – UEP Subang Jaya (USJ 1 to USJ 27), Subang Jaya (SS12 to SS19); FT 286 Malaysia Federal Route 286 – HICOM, Alam Megah (Section 27, 28); Damansara–Puchong Expressway – Puchong, Putrajaya; USJ 21 LRT station 5	Trumpet interchange
Selangor	Petaling	13.2	605	Putra Heights I/C	Persiaran Putra Indah – Putra Heights, Bukit Lanchong, Alam Megah (Section 27 & 28), USJ; P&R Putra Heights LRT station 4 5	Trumpet interchange
Selangor	Petaling-Kuala Langat district border		BR	Sungai Klang bridge		
Selangor	Kuala Langat	17.0	606	Saujana Putra I/C	Persiaran Saujana Putra – Bandar Saujana Putra, Kampung Lombong; South Klang Valley Expressway – Kajang, Putrajaya, Cyberjaya, Banting, Telok Panglima Garang, Pulau Indah	Trumpet interchange
Selangor	Kuala Langat	21.0	607	Putrajaya I/C	North–South Expressway Central Link (Putrajaya Link) – Putrajaya, Cyberjaya, Kajang, Puchong (Bandar Nusaputra/Taman Putra Perdana), Kuala Lumpur (Jalan Tun Razak), Bukit Jalil, KL Sports City, Multimedia University (MMU)	Trumpet interchange
Selangor	Kuala Langat	22.9	RSA	Dengkil RSA	Dengkil RSA – Petron Caltex	Northbound
Selangor	Kuala Langat	23.6	RSA	Dengkil RSA	Dengkil RSA – Petron Shell	Southbound
Selangor	Kuala Langat	23.6	607A	Bandar Gamuda Cove I/C	Gamuda Cove Main Road – Bandar Gamuda Cove, Cyberjaya	Semi-directional T interchange
Selangor	Sepang	31.6	608	KLIA I/C	North–South Expressway Central Link / FT 26 (KLIA Expressway) – Kuala Lumpur International Airport, Sepang, Bandar Enstek, Sungai Pelek, Nilai, Sepang International Circuit	Trumpet interchange
Selangor	Sepang		BR	Sungai Langat bridge		
Selangor	Sepang		609	Bandar Serenia I/C	FT 29 (Putrajaya–Cyberjaya Expressway) – Dengkil, Sepang, Bandar Enstek, Nilai	Trumpet interchange
Selangor	Sepang		BR	Railway crossing bridge		
Selangor	Sepang		610	Salak Tinggi I/C	B48 Selangor State Route B48 – Bandar Serenia, Salak Tinggi, Sepang, Dengkil, Bandar Enstek	Trumpet interchange Planned
Selangor	Sepang		BR	Sungai Jenderam bridge		
Negeri Sembilan	Seremban		611	Bandar Baru Nilai I/C	FT 32 (Malaysia Federal Route 32) – Bandar Baru Nilai, Nilai	Trumpet interchange Planned
Negeri Sembilan	Seremban	46.0	612 214	Nilai North I/C	North–South Expressway Southern Route / AH2 – Kuala Lumpur, Kajang, Bangi, Nilai, Seremban, Malacca City, Johor Bahru	Semi-directional T interchange

== Putrajaya Link ==
North–South Expressway Central Link
- Putrajaya Link
- Location: E6 Main Route–Lebuh Sentosa
- Existed: 1998–present
- History: Completed in 2000

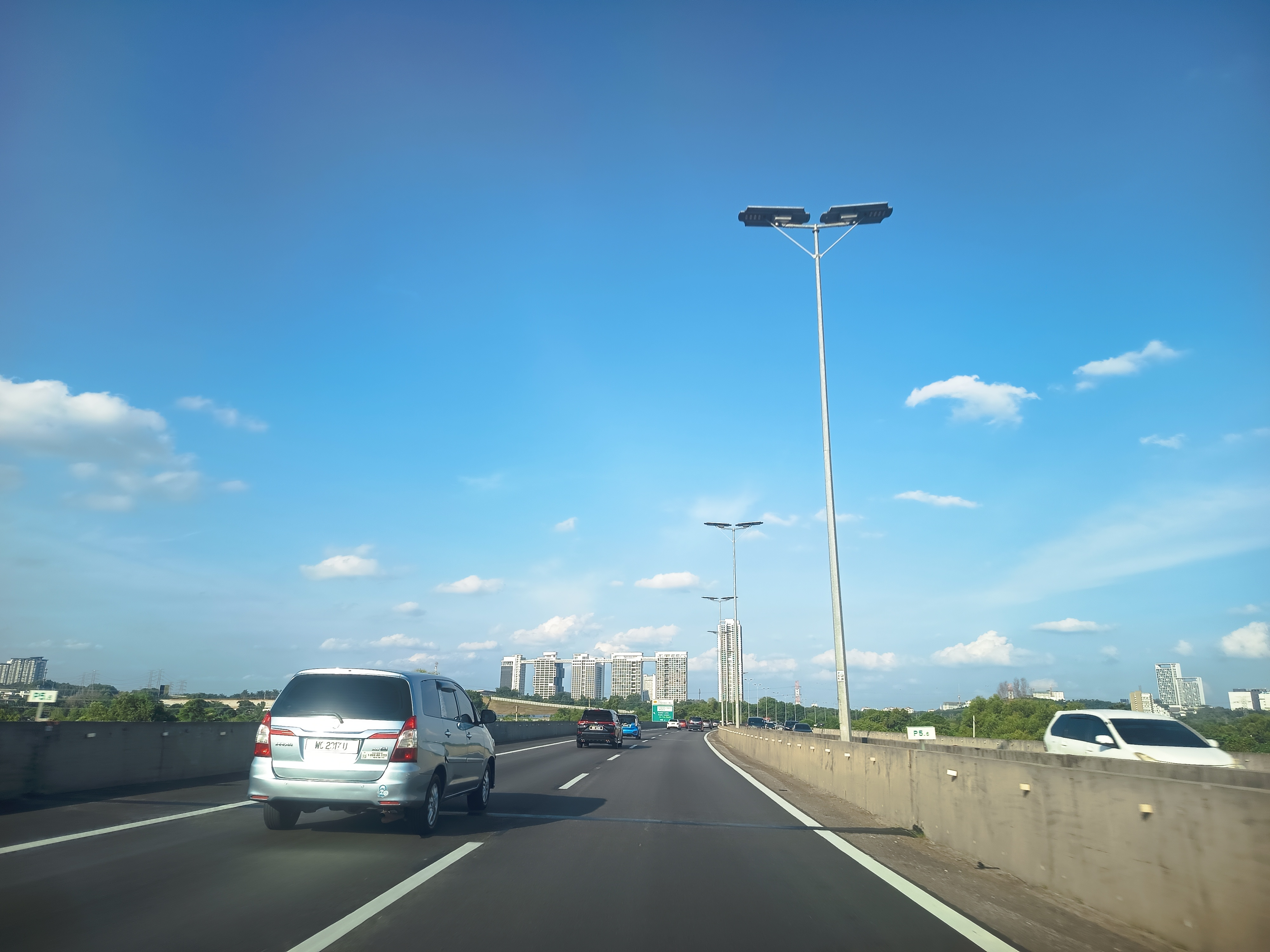
Putrajaya Link in July 2026

Putrajaya Link, or Persiaran Barat E6, is an expressway within North–South Expressway Central Link and also a major interchange in same expressway. The expressway connects Putrajaya Interchange to the Lebuh Sentosa interchange.

The Kilometre Zero of the expressway is located at Putrajaya Interchange.

=== History ===
Construction started in 1998. The Putrajaya Link which was connected to Putrajaya was opened in 2000.

In September 2003, the company Expressway Lingkaran Tengah Sdn Bhd (ELITE) became a member company of PLUS Expressways Berhad.

==== Incidents ====
On 28 February 2013, the under construction bridge at the Bandar Nusaputra Interchange Exit 613, kilometre P2.4 of the Putrajaya Link, a part of the North–South Expressway Central Link E6 collapse caused by water pipe leakage. No casualties or injuries were reported. The bridge was built by the Selangor State Development Corporation (PKNS) and not PLUS Expressways. It is unclear when the construction was complete. However, according to Google Maps Street View, traffic is being flown smoothly in all directions of the cloverleaf junction as of January 2019.

=== Interchange lists ===
Legend:

- I/C - Interchange, I/S - Intersection, RSA - Rest and service area, OBR - Overhead bridge restaurant, R/R - Restaurant and rest plaza, L/B - Layby, V/P - Vista point, TN - tunnel, T/P - Toll plaza, BR - Bridge
- C - Cloverleaf, S - Stack, T-A - Trumpet-A, T-B - Trumpet-B, DT - Directional-T/Y, SDT - Semi-Directional-T/Y, P-Y - Partial-Y, D - Diamond, P-C - Partial cloverleaf, D-D - Diverging diamond, D-R - Direct ramp

State/territory	District	Location	km	mi	Exit	Name	Destinations	Notes
Selangor	Kuala Langat	Cyberjaya	0.0	0.0	607	Putrajaya I/C	North–South Expressway Central Link (Main Route) / AH2 – Ipoh, Shah Alam, USJ, Bandar Saujana Putra, Kuala Lumpur International Airport (KLIA), Seremban, Malacca, Johor Bahru, Singapore	Trumpet interchange
Selangor	Sepang	Cyberjaya	1.2	0.75	Putrajaya Toll Plaza			
Selangor	Sepang	Cyberjaya	2.4	1.5		Bandar Nusaputra I/C	B15 Jalan Puchong–Dengkil – Bandar Nusaputra, Taman Putra Perdana, Puchong, Selangor Science Park 2, Cyberjaya	Cloverleaf interchange
Selangor	Sepang	Cyberjaya	3.6– 4.5	2.2– 2.8	613	Setia Eco Glades I/C	Unnamed road – Setia Eco Glades, Cyberjaya	Interchange
Selangor	Sepang	Cyberjaya	6.9	4.3	2005	Lake Link Bridge; Putrajaya–MEX I/C	Maju Expressway – Kuala Lumpur (Jalan Tun Razak), Bukit Jalil, KL Sports City (National Sports Complex)	Trumpet interchange
Selangor	Sepang	Cyberjaya	8.1	5.0		Cyberjaya Exit	Jalan Teknokrat 2 – Cyberjaya. Multimedia University (MMU)	Westbound exit to south only
Selangor	Sepang	Cyberjaya	8.3	5.2		Cyberjaya Exit	Persiaran APEC – Cyberjaya (U-Turn), Cyberjaya Satellite Earth Station, Limkokwing University Of Creative Technology (LUCT), Multimedia University (MMU)	Eastbound exit to north only
Selangor	Sepang	Cyberjaya	8.8	5.5		Putrajaya–Cyberjaya I/C	FT 29 Putrajaya–Cyberjaya Expressway – Kuala Lumpur, Petaling Jaya, Puchong, Shah Alam, Dengkil, Sepang, Kuala Lumpur International Airport (KLIA)	Cloverleaf interchange
Putrajaya	N/A	N/A				Putrajaya Sentral Exit	Jalan P7 D – P&R Putrajaya Sentral 7 12 , Putrajaya Hospital	Eastbound
Putrajaya	N/A	N/A				Lebuh Sentosa I/C	Lebuh Sentosa – Putrajaya Hospital , Seri Perdana, Government office, Perdana Putra Building, Putra Mosque, Presint—until --, Seri Saujana Bridge, Putrajaya Boulevard, Dataran Gemilang, Putrajaya International Convention Centre (PICC), Taman Selatan	Trumpet interchange
1.000 mi = 1.609 km; 1.000 km = 0.621 mi: Electronic toll collection; Incomplete access
