= KLIA Charter Field Town =

Coordinates: 2.7681219°N 101.6966974°E

The KLIA Charter Field Town or KLIA Town Centre (Malay: Pusat Bandar KLIA) is a town centre within Kuala Lumpur International Airport (KLIA) in Sepang, Selangor, Malaysia. The town centre was established in 1993 during the construction of KLIA.

== Facilities ==
- Maybank
- Caltex petrol station
- Restoran Alimaju
- The Zon (Duty free)

== See also ==
- Sepang topics
