= Sultan Abdul Samad Mosque =

Mosque in Sepang, Selangor, Malaysia

Coordinates: 2.7306°N 101.7177°E

Sultan Abdul Samad KLIA Mosque
- Masjid Sultan Abdul Samad KLIA
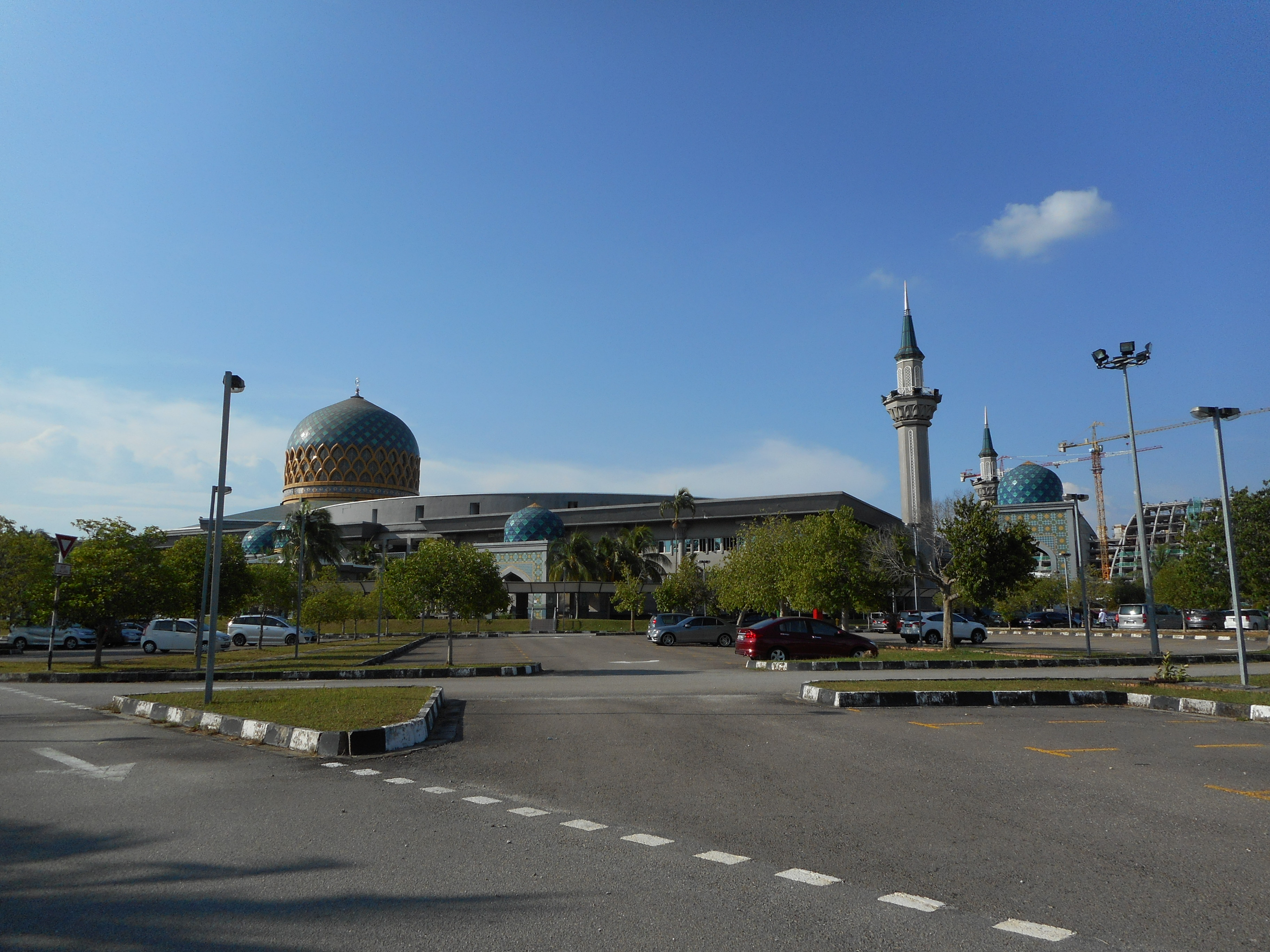

Religion
- Affiliation: Shafi'i

Location
- Location: Sepang, Selangor, Malaysia
- Interactive map of Sultan Abdul Samad KLIA Mosque

Architecture
- Architect: DBA Arkitek
- Style: Middle Eastern; Islamic; Malay
- Founder: Government of Selangor
- Completed: 1999

Specifications
- Dome: 3
- Minaret: 2

The Sultan Abdul Samad Mosque or KLIA Mosque (Malay: Masjid Sultan Abdul Samad KLIA) is a mosque near Kuala Lumpur International Airport (KLIA) at Sepang District, Selangor, Malaysia. The mosque was originally named as KLIA Mosque and was officially named after Almarhum Sultan Abdul Samad who was the fourth Sultan of Selangor. It is also used as an international mosque for tourist who arrived and depart from/to KLIA. It is also a public mosque for Muslims from Salak Tinggi and KLIA Town Centre.

Spanning 17.96 acres (7.27 ha), the mosque could accommodate 8,000 congregants.

== History ==
Made for the opening of the Kuala Lumpur International Airport, the construction of the mosque began in August 1997 and was completed in 1999. The mosque was officially opened on 25 August 2000 by the Regent of Selangor at that time, Tengku Idris Shah (now Sultan Sharafuddin Idris Shah).

== Architecture ==
The design of the mosque follows the Classical Arab architectural style, with the main features being the domes and a flat roof. The floor plan of the mosque follows the local Malay style, particularly in the courtyard area of the mosque.

== Gallery ==
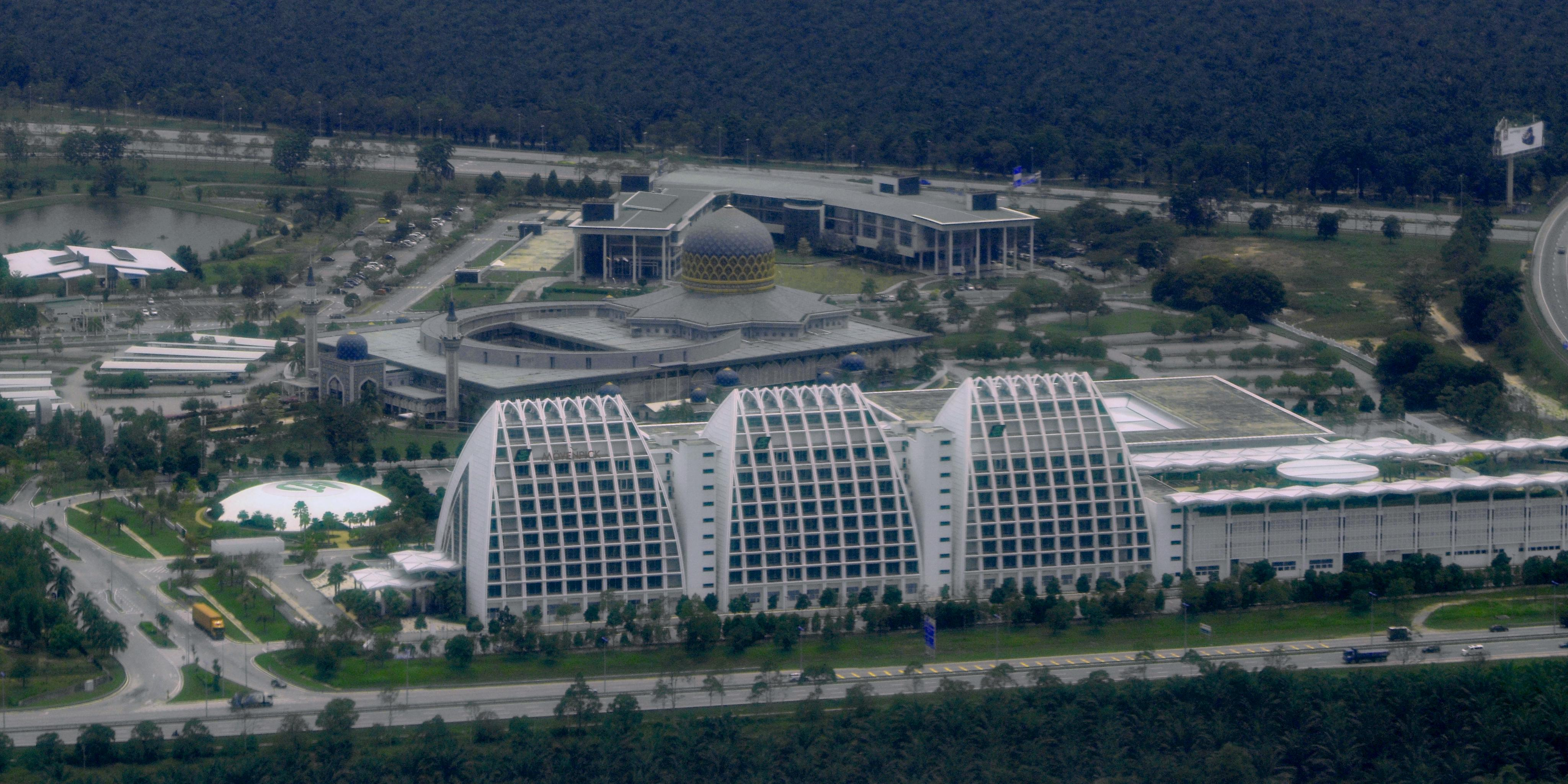
Aerial view of Mövenpick Hotel & Convention Centre KLIA and Sultan Abdul Samad Mosque in April 2022

== See also ==
- Islam in Malaysia
