= Sepang =

Town in Selangor, Malaysia

Coordinates: 2°41′30″N 101°45′05″E

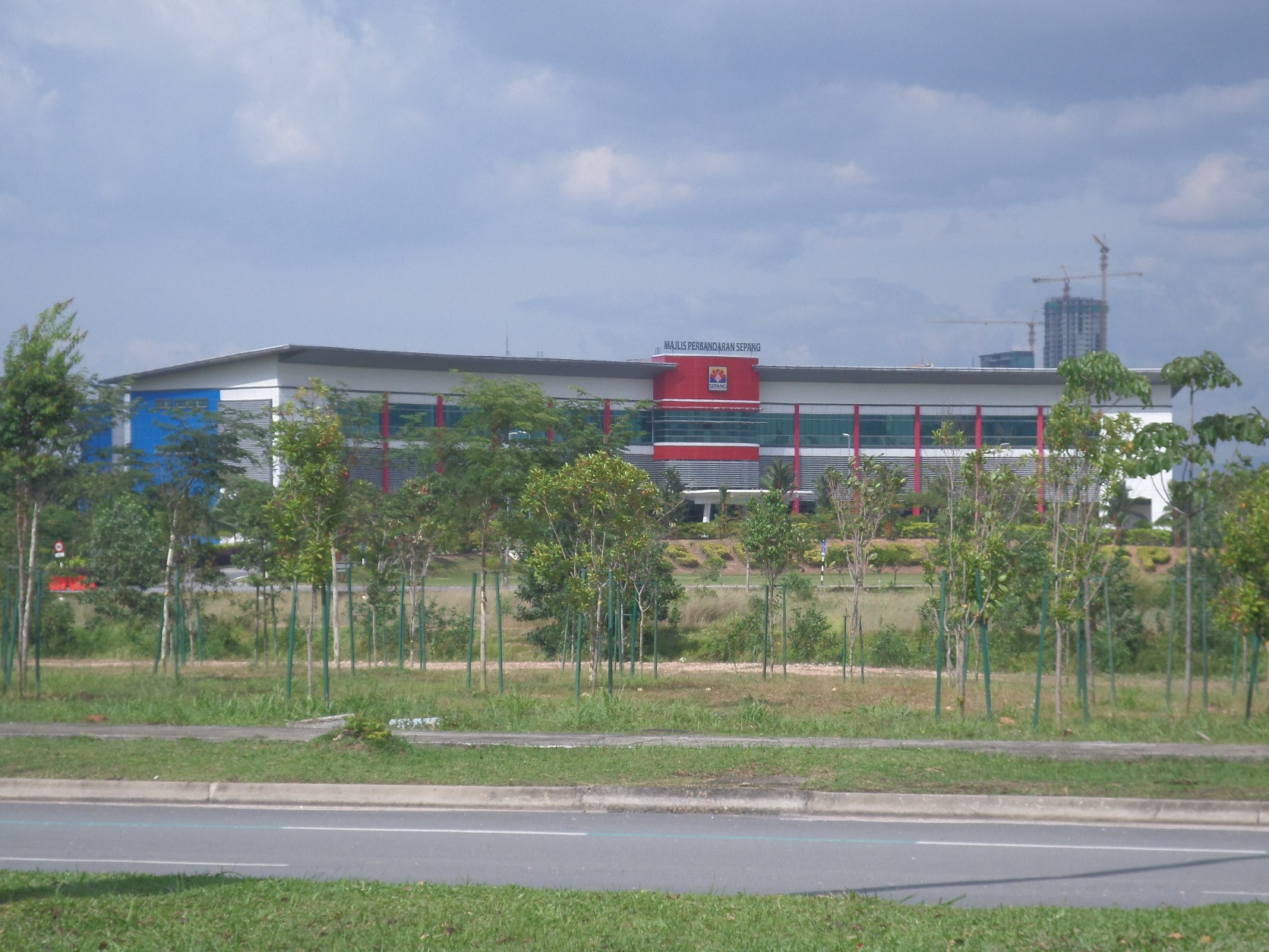
Sepang Municipal Council

Sepang Town in Sepang District

Sepang (/səˈpæŋ/ sə-PANG, Malay pronunciation: [ˈsəpaŋ]) is a small border town (pekan) and also a mukim in Sepang District, Selangor, Malaysia. The most known part of the town is its western part, which contains both Kuala Lumpur International Airport – Malaysia's largest airport – and the Sepang International Circuit, where the Malaysian F1 Grand Prix was and Malaysian MotoGP Grand Prix is held.

== History ==
The town was said to be named after the sepang (Biancaea sappan) tree.

Prior to the building of the airport, Sepang as is with the rest of its district relied heavily on rubber. There were 3 major plantations that existed across Sepang as of 1991: Ladang Sepang, Ladang Sopic and Lo Thiam Estate altogether covering 3415 hectares. Wild tigers were often encountered in these plantations endangering or taking lives of rubber tappers leading to high profile hunts between 1910s and the 1920s; this threat was pervasive as far late as the 1950s. Wild sun bears were a similar problem: in 1959, a rubber tapper was reported to kill a bear measuring 260 lb (120 kg) attacking him and 2 other colleagues.

== Administrative divisions ==
The area of Mukim Sepang covers 198.08 km^{2}. There are 6 Malay villages, 2 Chinese New villages and 31 neighbourhoods in this mukim.

== Schools ==
- SJK (C) Sepang
