= ASEAN University Network =

International college and university associations and consortium

- Abbreviation: AUN
- Formation: November 1995; 31 years ago
- Headquarters: Jamjuree 10 Building, Chulalongkorn University, Phyathai Road, Bangkok, Thailand
- Region served: Southeast Asia
- Members: 30 core member universities 165 associate member universities
- Executive Director: Choltis Dhirathiti, Ph.D.
- Parent organization: Association of Southeast Asian Nations (ASEAN)
- Website: www.aunsec.org

The ASEAN University Network (AUN) is an Asian university association. It was founded in November 1995 by ASEAN member countries including 13 universities. After the enlargement of ASEAN by the ASEAN Charter in 1997 and 1999, the AUN membership has been increasing.

== Structure ==
The ASEAN University Network (AUN) is an arrangement between 30 universities in the ten ASEAN countries. The AUN is composed of a Board of Trustees (BOT), the participating universities, and the AUN Secretariat. The Board of Trustees consists of one representative from each of the ASEAN Member Countries, the Secretary-General of ASEAN, the Chairman of the ASEAN subcommittee on Education (ASCOE) and the executive director of the AUN. The BOT has the task of formulating policies, approving project proposals, the allocation of budgets and co-ordinating implementation activities. The board makes decisions on these activities on the basis of consensus. The participating universities have the task of implementing the AUN programmes and activities. When AUN was founded in 1995, it consisted of thirteen universities from seven countries. Due to the inclusion of Myanmar, Laos and Cambodia in ASEAN, the network grew to 21 members. Although numerous applications for membership have been received, it was decided to only admit universities from the new member countries. Non members from the region however, are invited as observers on a regular basis. The AUN Secretariat is involved in the planning, organisation, monitoring and evaluation of AUN activities and also in the development of new ideas and the acquisition of funding. The permanent office of the Secretariat was established in 2000 and is located on the campus of Chulalongkorn University in Bangkok. The operating costs of the secretariat are (at least until 2005) allocated by the Thai Government.

The financing of AUN activities comes from either cost sharing between the participating universities or from the external 'dialogue partners' of ASEAN. The dialogue partners are Australia, Canada, China, EU, India, Japan, New Zealand, ROK, Russia and the United States. The United Nations Development Program (UNDP) also has dialogue status.

The meetings within the AUN Framework are financed by the hosts and travel expenses by the (universities of the) participants, or by universities from the richer countries for the poorer countries.

== Development ==
The ASEAN University Network emerged from a highly ambitious idea of the ASEAN leaders and the ASEAN Subcommittee on Education (ASCOE) to establish an ASEAN University. A year after this idea was launched, it became clear that this would present too many problems concerning funding, location and leadership. Therefore, in 1994, it was decided that the founding of a network of existing institutions would be more feasible. In its early years (1995–1999), the AUN focused mainly on the sharing of knowledge and experiences and on small-scale student and staff exchange. As from 1999, the collaborative activities became more complex with programmes like joint curriculum development, co-operation in ICT and the establishment of sub-networks. This is not only the case for intra-ASEAN co-operation but also for the activities with the dialogue partners. Dalat International School

This also led to the establishment of a permanent secretariat in Bangkok in March 2000. Although there existed a secretariat since 1997, this secretariat was temporary. With the permanent office also came an increase in structural funding for the secretariat. In addition to the operating costs for the AUN secretariat, also the financial support for AUN activities increased substantially since 1999. In addition to a growth in financial terms, projects also became more comprehensive. In particular, the AUN Quality Assurance programme has very ambitious goals with consequences that transcend the disciplinary boundaries. This can also form a turning point in the sense that through such projects all members of the participating universities will be affected. Many of the current activities are focused on particular individuals of the universities, and many other students and staff that are not involved in activities are not familiar with AUN and its activities. Most exchanges and gatherings for instance, although successful, have been modest in its impact on the universities as a whole. An explanation for this lies in the top-down character of the activities, with a high involvement of the university's central level (and in some countries the ministry level) and only modest involvement of the faculties.

== AUN Core member universities ==
Location of ASEAN Core Member Universities

Currently, AUN is composed of 30 core member universities across 10 ASEAN countries:

Brunei

- University of Brunei Darussalam (UBD) (Bandar Seri Begawan)

Cambodia

- Royal University of Law and Economics (RULE) (Phnom Penh)
- Royal University of Phnom Penh (RUPP) (Phnom Penh)

Indonesia

- Institut Teknologi Bandung (ITB) (Bandung)
- Universitas Airlangga (UNAIR) (Surabaya)
- Universitas Gadjah Mada (UGM) (Yogyakarta)
- Universitas Indonesia (UI) (Jakarta)

Laos

- National University of Laos (NUOL) (Vientiane)

Malaysia

- National University of Malaysia (UKM) (Bangi, Selangor)
- University of Malaya (UM) (Kuala Lumpur)
- Universiti Putra Malaysia (UPM) (Serdang, Selangor)
- Universiti Sains Malaysia (USM) (Gelugor, Penang)
- Northern University of Malaysia (UUM) (Sintok, Kedah)

Myanmar

- University of Mandalay (MU) (Mandalay)
- University of Yangon (UY) (Yangon)
- Yangon University of Economics (YUE) (former Yangon Institute of Economics) (Yangon)

Philippines

- Ateneo de Manila University (AdMU) (Quezon City)
- De La Salle University (DLSU) (Manila)
- University of the Philippines (UP) (Quezon City)

Singapore

- Nanyang Technological University (NTU) (Singapore West)
- National University of Singapore (NUS) (Singapore Central)
- Singapore Management University (SMU) (Singapore Central)

Thailand

- Burapha University (BUU) (Chonburi)
- Chiang Mai University (CMU) (Chiang Mai)
- Chulalongkorn University (CU) (Bangkok)
- Mahidol University (MU) (Bangkok, Nakhon Pathom)
- Prince of Songkla University (PSU) (Songkla)

Vietnam

- Can Tho University (CTU) (Can Tho)
- Vietnam National University, Hanoi (VNU-Hanoi) (Hanoi)
- Vietnam National University, Ho Chi Minh City (VNU-HCM) (Ho Chi Minh City)

== AUN Associate member universities ==
Currently, AUN is composed of 165 associate member universities across 9 ASEAN countries:

Brunei

- Universiti Islam Sultan Sharif Ali
- Universiti Teknologi Brunei

Cambodia

- Build Bright University
- CamEd Institute
- Institute of Technology of Cambodia
- National University of Management
- Svay Rieng University Cambodia
- University of South-East Asia

Indonesia

- Institut Pertanian Bogor
- Institut Teknologi Sepuluh Nopember
- London School of Public Relations Jakarta (Institut Komunikasi dan Bisnis LSPR)
- Parahyangan Catholic University
- Petra Christian University
- State Islamic University of Yogyakarta
- Syiah Kuala University
- Universitas Ahmad Dahlan
- Universitas Andalas
- Universitas Bina Nusantara
- Universitas Brawijaya
- Universitas Diponegoro
- Universitas Gunadarma
- Universitas Hasanuddin
- University of Hayam Wuruk Perbanas
- Universitas Islam Indonesia
- Universitas Islam Negeri Sunan Gunung Djati Bandung
- Universitas Islam Negeri Syarif Hidayatullah Jakarta
- Universitas Islam Negeri Walisongo
- Universitas Islam Negeri Maulana Malik Ibrahim Malang
- Universitas Jember
- Universitas Katolik Indonesia Atma Jaya
- Universitas Katolik Widya Mandala Surabaya
- Universitas Lampung
- Universitas Muhammadiyah Malang
- Universitas Muhammadiyah Surakarta
- Universitas Muhammadiyah Yogyakarta
- Universitas Multimedia Nusantara
- Universitas Negeri Malang
- Universitas Negeri Padang
- Universitas Negeri Semarang
- Universitas Negeri Surabaya
- Universitas Negeri Yogyakarta
- Universitas Pendidikan Indonesia
- University of Pembangunan Nasional Veteran Jakarta
- Universitas Sam Ratulangi
- Universitas Sanata Dharma
- Universitas Sebelas Maret
- Universitas Sembilanbelas November Kolaka
- Universitas Sultan Ageng Tirtayasa
- Universitas Sumatera Utara
- Universitas Surabaya
- Universitas Telkom
- Universitas Trisakti
- Universitas Udayana

Malaysia

- Allianze University College of Medical Sciences
- Asia Pacific University of Technology & Innovation
- International Medical University
- International University of Malaya-Wales
- Limkokwing University of Creative Technology
- Lincoln University College, Malaysia
- Management & Science University
- Nilai University
- Nottingham University Malaysia
- Open University Malaysia
- Perbadanan Putrajaya
- Sunway University College
- Universiti Islam Antarabangsa
- Universiti Kuala Lumpur
- Universiti Malaysia Sarawak
- Universiti Malaysia Kelantan
- Universiti Malaysia Pahang
- Universiti Malaysia Perlis
- Universiti Malaysia Sabah
- Universiti Perguruan Sultan Idris
- Universiti Teknologi Malaysia
- Universiti Teknologi MARA
- Universiti Tun Abdul Razak
- Universiti Tun Hussein Onn Malaysia
- Universiti Tunku Abdul Rahman

Myanmar

- Mandalay Technological University
- Myanmar Aerospace Engineering University
- Myanmar Maritime University
- Technological University (Hmawbi)
- Technological University (Kyaukse)
- Technological University (Thanlyin)
- University of Co-operative and Management, Thanlyin
- University of Information Technology
- Yangon Technological University
- West Yangon Technological University

Philippines

- Adventist International Institute of Advanced Studies
- Cagayan State University
- Cebu Technological University
- Centro Escolar University
- Central Luzon State University
- De La Salle–College of Saint Benilde
- De La Salle Medical and Health Sciences Institute
- Holy Angel University
- Lyceum of the Philippines University-Batangas
- Mapua University
- Mindanao State University-Iligan Institute of Technology
- Notre Dame of Marbel University
- University of St. La Salle
- Far Eastern University
- Technological Institute of the Philippines
- Trinity University of Asia
- University of the East, Manila
- University of the Immaculate Conception
- University of San Jose–Recoletos
- University of Santo Tomas
- University of Southeastern Philippines
- Visayas State University
- Xavier University - Ateneo de Cagayan
- Polytechnic University of the Philippines

Singapore

- Singapore University of Technology and Design

Thailand

- Assumption University
- Kasetsart University
- King Mongkut's Institute of Technology Ladkrabang
- King Mongkut's University of Technology North Bangkok
- King Mongkut's University of Technology Thonburi
- Mae Fah Luang University
- Mahasarakham University
- Lampang Rajabhat University
- Rajamangala University of Technology Thanyaburi
- Silpakorn University
- Srinakharinwirot University

Vietnam

- Ho Chi Minh University of Banking
- Foreign Trade University
- Dalat University
- FPT University
- Hanoi Architectural University
- Hanoi University of Mining and Geology
- Hanoi University Of Public Health
- Hanoi University of Science and Technology
- Ho Chi Minh City Open University
- Ho Chi Minh City University of Education
- Ho Chi Minh City University of Food Industry
- Ho Chi Minh City University of Technology
- Ho Chi Minh City University of Technology and Education
- Ho Chi Minh City University of Transport
- Hoa Sen University
- Hong Bang International University
- Huế University
- Hung Yen University of Technology and Education
- Industrial University of Ho Chi Minh City
- Lạc Hồng University
- National University of Civil Engineering
- Nguyen Tat Thanh University
- Nông Lâm University
- Saigon Technology University
- Saigon University
- Tay Nguyen University
- Thai Nguyen University
- University of Đà Nẵng
- Thủ Dầu Một University
- Thủy Lợi University
- Tôn Đức Thắng University
- Tra Vinh University
- University of Architecture Ho Chi Minh City
- University of Economics Ho Chi Minh City
- University of Medicine and Pharmacy at Ho Chi Minh City
- University of Social Sciences & Humanities
- University of Transport and Communications
- Văn Hiến University
- Văn Lang University
- Vietnam Maritime University
- Vietnam National University of Agriculture
- Vinh University
