= Bandar Baru Nilai =

Coordinates: 2.8173677°N 101.7591958°E

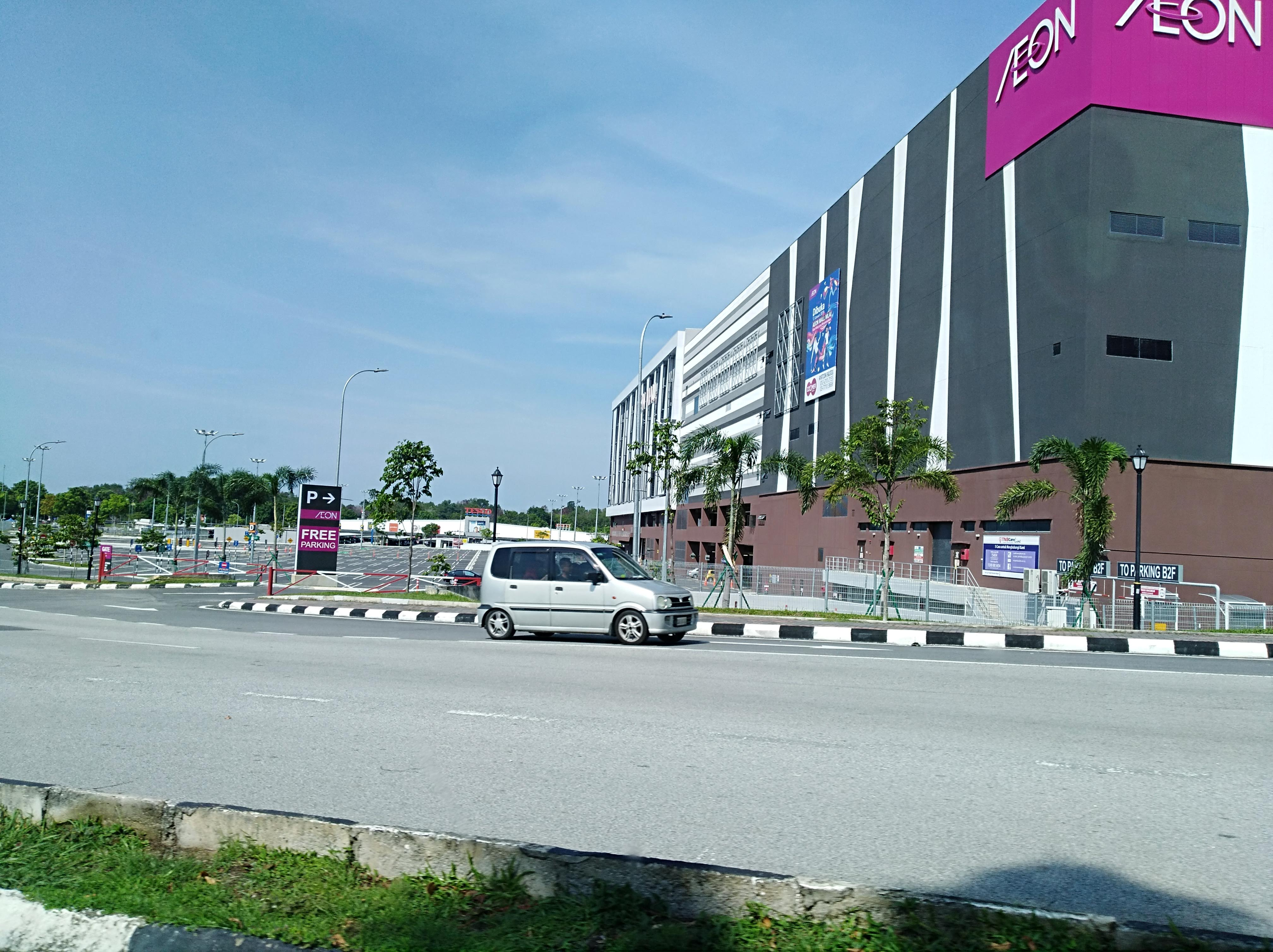
AEON Mall Nilai at Bandar Baru Nilai

Bandar Baru Nilai or Putra Nilai is a new township in Nilai, Negeri Sembilan, Malaysia. It is nearest to Nilai Old Town, also known as Nilai. Due to its proximity, and connection through the KTM to Kuala Lumpur, Putrajaya, and Kuala Lumpur International Airport, it is a rapidly growing new town. Development projects can be seen as one drives around Nilai. Two of Malaysia's most well-known colleges and two universities are located in Nilai: Nilai University, INTI International University, Manipal International University, Universiti Sains Islam Malaysia and Islamic University College of Malaysia. As a result, the town is occupied by students from all over the world. Students from over 30 countries can be seen in Nilai. Many people from other areas, especially from Klang Valley, live in Nilai to avoid traffic congestion and crowding in Klang Valley.

Bandar Baru Nilai has become a popular shopping town with the establishment of several major shopping malls such as Nilai 3 Wholesale Centre, Nilai Square, Mydin, Giant Hypermarket, Lotus's, MesaMall and ÆON Mall Nilai.

== Climate ==
Köppen-Geiger climate classification system classifies its climate as tropical rainforest (Af).

Climate data for Nilai
Month	Jan	Feb	Mar	Apr	May	Jun	Jul	Aug	Sep	Oct	Nov	Dec	Year
Mean daily maximum °C (°F)	31 (88)	31.7 (89.1)	32.3 (90.1)	32.1 (89.8)	31.7 (89.1)	31.5 (88.7)	31.2 (88.2)	31.1 (88.0)	31.3 (88.3)	31.2 (88.2)	31.1 (88.0)	31 (88)	31.4 (88.6)
Daily mean °C (°F)	26.5 (79.7)	27.1 (80.8)	27.4 (81.3)	27.6 (81.7)	27.5 (81.5)	27.2 (81.0)	26.9 (80.4)	26.9 (80.4)	27 (81)	27 (81)	27 (81)	26.7 (80.1)	27.1 (80.8)
Mean daily minimum °C (°F)	22.1 (71.8)	22.5 (72.5)	22.6 (72.7)	23.2 (73.8)	23.4 (74.1)	23 (73)	22.7 (72.9)	22.8 (73.0)	22.7 (72.9)	22.8 (73.0)	22.9 (73.2)	22.5 (72.5)	22.8 (73.0)
Average precipitation mm (inches)	149 (5.9)	137 (5.4)	213 (8.4)	246 (9.7)	184 (7.2)	119 (4.7)	123 (4.8)	152 (6.0)	169 (6.7)	249 (9.8)	263 (10.4)	219 (8.6)	2,223 (87.6)
Source: Climate-Data.org (altitude: 50m)

== Education ==
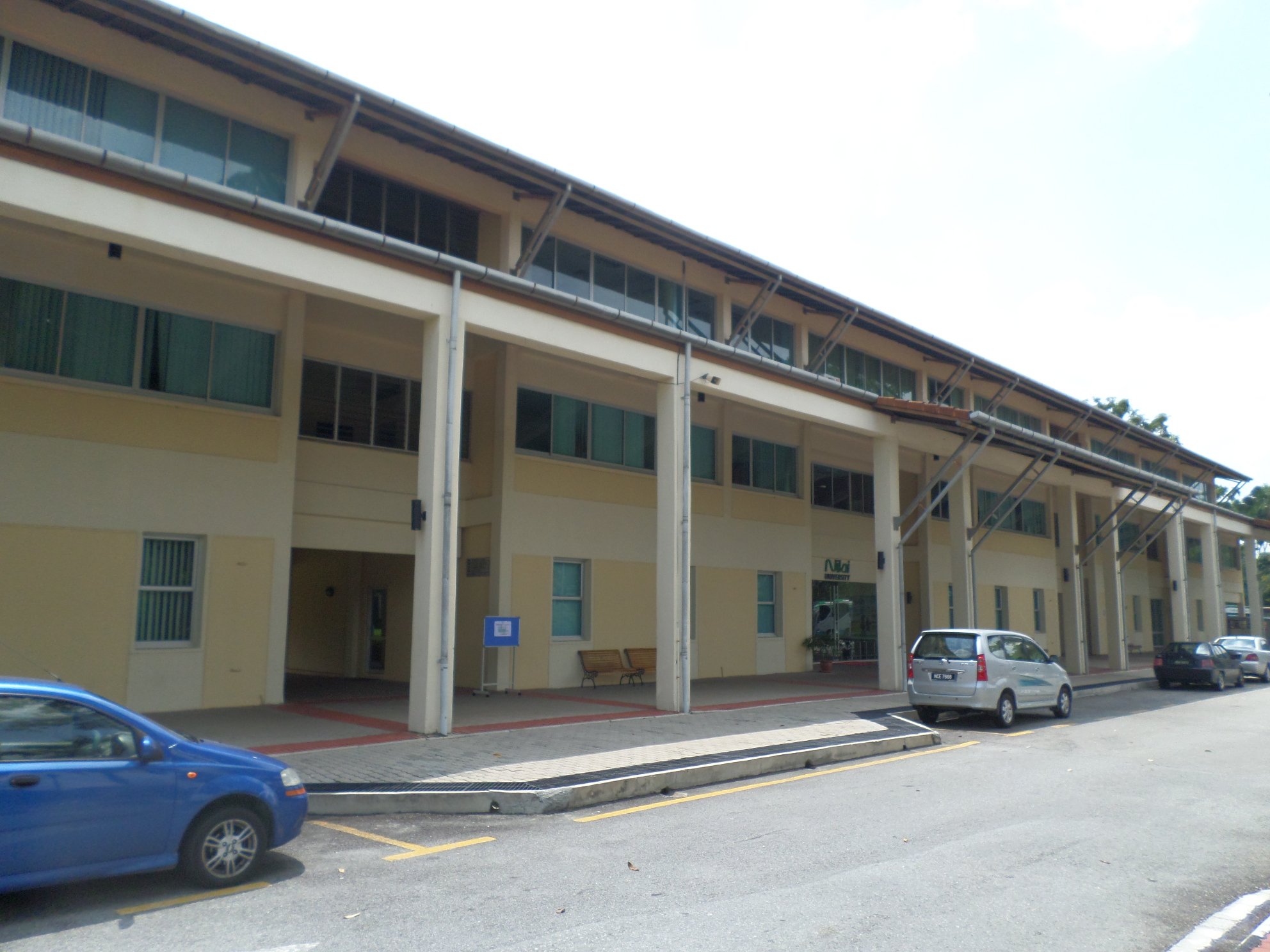
Nilai University

An initiative by the state government to turn Negri Sembilan into an educational hub has also borne fruit as several foreign and local institutions of higher education have agreed to set up operations here.

Among them are Britain's Epsom College which has acquired land in Bandar Enstek to set up its first institute outside England, Epsom College in Malaysia and the City University College of Science and Technology which signed an agreement to acquire a 40 ha parcel of land here recently.

The state would also benefit from the construction of the RM1.2 bil Education Ministry complex which would, among others, house the Aminuddin Baki Institute, Institut Pendidikan Guru, English Language Institute, Tunku Kurshiah College and Nilai Polytechnic as well as the International Islamic University Malaysia’s medical faculty and the International University College of Nursing.

Several institutions of higher learning that have been built in the area include Nilai University, INTI International University and Universiti Sains Islam Malaysia.

== See also ==
- Nilai
