= MIIT =

MIIT could stand for:

- Miit (TV series), an Indian television series that aired in 2003
- Moscow State University of Railway Engineering
- Ministry of Industry and Information Technology of the People's Republic of China
- Myanmar Institute of Information Technology (Mandalay)
