= Tin Hlaing (writer) =

Burmese writer and politician

Tin Hlaing တင်လှိုင်
- Born: Tin Hlaing; 1941 (age 84–85); Monywa District, Sagaing Region
- Occupations: Writer; professor
- Known for: first Director general of the Department of Atomic Energy, Myanmar
- Notable work: Founder of the Department of Atomic Energy, Myanmar
- Spouse: Mya Mya Swe
- Children: 3
- Awards: Myanmar National Literature Award (2004, 2010, 2019); Thuta Swesone literary award Tun Foundation Literature Award 2008

Tin Hlaing (Burmese: တင်လှိုင်; born 1941), is a Burmese writer, translator, professor who is the founder and first Director general of the Department of Atomic Energy, Myanmar.

== Early life and career ==
Tin Hlaing was born in 1941 in Sagaing Region, Monywa District, Ayadaw Township, Thakhot Pinle Village. From 1951 to 1958, he studied at Mandalay Diocesan Thante High School. He continued his education at Mandalay University. He received his Bachelor of Science (Honors) degree in Physics in 1963. In 1972, he received a scholarship from the British Council (Colombo Project) and received his M.Sc. degree from the University of London. In 1967 he received his Ph.D. in Nuclear Physics. He has served as a tautor at Mawlamyine, Monywa and Mandalay Universities for over 30 years.

In 1995, he was transferred to the Myanmar Science and Technology Research Department and became the Director. In 1997, he was founded the Department of Atomic Energy, Myanmar and became its first Director general.

He has been a part-time professor at Yangon Technological University for five years. After retiring in 2001, he still serves as an executive member of the Myanmar Institute of Information Technology. He is also a member of the New York Academy of Sciences.

== Literary career ==
In his literary work, his pen name is Boe Hlaing. He has authored a number of research papers and two university textbooks (in English). In addition, he also writes articles for magazines.

=== Published books ===
- Stephen Hawking Essays
- Kay Oops
- Famous classic words

=== Translated books ===
- Ignited Minds
- Discovery of India
- Jawaharlal Nehru: The Lightning World History (Vol. 3)

== Awards ==
- Myanmar National Literature Award, Translation:Ignited Minds, Discovery of India and Jawaharlal Nehru: The Lightning World History (Vol. 3),(2004, 2010, 2019)
- Thuta Swesone literary award
- Tun Foundation Literature Award, Translation: Victory into Defeat (2008)

== Personal life ==
He is married to Daw Mya Mya Swe (a retired lecturer in botany) and has three children.
