= Topica =

Topica may refer to:

- Topics (Aristotle) (Topica in Latin), a treatise by the ancient Greek philosopher Aristotle
- One of the Writings of Cicero
- The Topica Edtech Group
