= Topica Edtech Group =

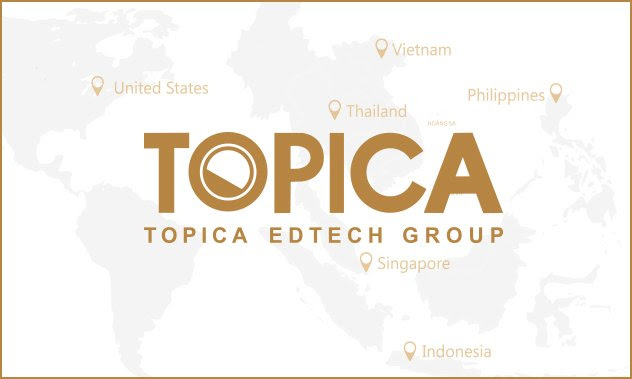
- Website type: Online education
- Available in: English, Vietnamese
- Headquarters: 28 Nguyen Tri Phuong Street, Thuan Hoa Ward, Hue City.
- Employees: 1300 + (May 2016)
- Website: topicauni.edu.vn
- Commercial: Yes
- Users: 250000 +
- Launched: 2008; 18 years ago
- Current status: Active

Topica Edtech Group (Vietnamese: Tổ hợp giáo dục Topica) is a multinational educational technology company. It provides online education including bachelor's degree programs (Topica Uni), English speech tutoring courses (Topica Native) and technology platform for massive online open courses in a variety of fields (Edumall).

Topica Edtech Group headquartered in Hanoi, Vietnam and has expanded into the Philippines, Singapore, Thailand, Indonesia and the United States.

== History ==
In April 2004, a group of professors in the Centre for Research and Consulting on Management, Hanoi University of Science and Technology, initiated an Online Training Program and International Cooperation named CRC-TOPIC. The entrepreneurship incubator project received financial support by Infodev.

In 2006, Microsoft Chairman, Bill Gates and the Deputy Prime Minister of Vietnam, Pham Gia Khiem, launched TOPIC64 as an E-learning infrastructure development project in 64 provinces of Vietnam. Qualcomm announced that it was a one sponsor of the project, besides Microsoft, Hewlett Packard and USAID.

In 2007, TOPIC64 and MIT Professor Charles Leiserson launched the Boston-Hanoi online course "Intro to Algorithms" for 30 Vietnamese students.

In 2008, Topica Edtech Group was founded as an education technology company whose mission is to promote high-quality online education among learners in Vietnam and South East Asia.

At the same time, following Harvard, Stanford, MIT and Duke University, Topica Edtech Group applied 3D simulation technology in teaching. This brought a realistic experience in virtual 3D space.

In 2010, the company organized an online training course on Business Incubator for 105 managers from 15 Asia-Pacific countries.

In 2011, Topica Founder Institute (TFI) launched the first batch of startup accelerator from Silicon Valley in Vietnam.

In 2013, the company launched mobile learning app Topica Mobile in Vietnam.

In 2014, they launched Online English speech tutoring platform Topica Native (TOPMITO) allowing students speaking via Google Glass with native speakers.

Until 2016, Topica Edtech Group has partnered with 11 universities across the Philippines, Vietnam and the United States.

In April, 2016, according to an article in E27, Topica Edtech Group signed a partnership deal with Coursera. Through this pact, one of Topica's partners in Vietnam - Vinh University - recognized credits from some of Coursera's 1,800 online courses.

In August 2026, Phu Xuan University (PXU), a higher education institution under the EQuest Education Group[1], officially acquired the Topica Uni brand. Following this acquisition, the university announced the establishment of the Topica International Institute.

The Topica International Institute serves as the university's primary unit dedicated to educational technology (EdTech) and online education. The institute's core activities include:

Administering distance-learning bachelor's degree programs, with degrees officially awarded by Phu Xuan University.

Offering short-term, credit-bearing courses at the undergraduate level.

Researching, developing, and integrating advanced EdTech solutions into instructional practices.

Currently, the institute's academic programs focus on the social sciences, business, and technology, specifically offering majors in:[2]

Business Administration

English Language

Chinese Language

Information Technology (Digital Graphics concentration)

Tourism and Hospitality Management

== Courses ==
Topica Edtech Group offers online bachelor's degree programs, online English speech tutoring and training courses in a variety of topics. Each course often includes visual elements, such as lecture video, animations and graphics, online textbook and a mini test at the end of each lesson. Instructors and course participants can interact with each other in discussion forums. All elements of the courses can be viewed at any time and in any wireless devices whenever the Internet connection is available.

In 2008, it integrated 3D technology called “Second Life”, where students can walk around and interact inside that 3D virtual environment into online bachelor's degree program (Topica Uni). It has cooperated with 11 universities in Vietnam, the Philippines and the United States to provide online bachelor's degree in business administration, accounting, finance and banking, information technology, law and economy law. Beside academic lecture video, the participants could also learn practical knowledge and experience from successful entrepreneurs.

In 2014, Topica also supplied TOPMITO (or Topica Native), an Online English speech tutoring platform through Google Glass, computers, and mobile devices. Course participants could choose different study paths with English native teachers. The course utilized the English ability testing system CASEC, initiated based on research of STEP and developed by Japan Institute for Educational Measurement (JIEM) in order to evaluate participant's progression.

In March 2016, Topica invited professors and experts to put their courses on its online platform (Edumall). The courses mostly covered Information Technology, Personal Development, Business and Startup, Design, Marketing, Office Software and English.

== Business Accelerator ==
According to Deal Street Asia, Topica Founder Institute (TFI) is an early-stage startup accelerator. It is a batch of startup accelerator from Silicon Valley which has run in 40 countries. In 2010, it organized a training course on Business Incubation for 105 managers from 15 Asia-Pacific countries.

After 3 years, it incubated quite a number of technology startups, the most notable of which was Appota, which raised a series B round April, 2014.

== Partners ==
- Hanoi Open University (Vietnam – 2009)
- Duy Tan University (Vietnam – 2010)
- Tra Vinh University (Vietnam – 2012)
- National Economics University (Vietnam – 2012)
- Thai Nguyen University (Vietnam – 2013)
- AMA University (Philippines – 2013)
- Palawan National University (Philippines – 2015)
- Don Mariano Marcos Memorial State University (Philippines – 2015)
- Franklin University (The United States – 2016)
- Ohio National University (The United States – 2016)
- Urbana University (The United States – 2016)
- Coursera (MOOCs – 2016)

== See also ==
- Coursera
- EdX
- IONISx
- MIT OpenCourseWare
- National Programme on Technology Enhanced Learning, India
- Udemy
- Udacity
- Standford's Extension School
- Open Culture
- Harvard Extension School
- Khan Academy
- FutureLearn
