= Universiti Sains Islam Malaysia =

Public university in Malaysia

Coordinates: 2°50′37″N 101°46′37″E

- Motto: Berilmu, Berdisiplin Dan Bertakwa
- Motto in English: Knowledgeable, Disciplined and Devout
- Type: Public
- Established: 1998
- Chancellor: Tuanku Aishah Rohani
- Vice-Chancellor: Mohamed Ridza Wahiddin
- Pro-Chancellor: Tunku Ali Redhauddin; Zaki Azmi
- Location: Bandar Baru Nilai, 71800 Nilai, Negeri Sembilan, Malaysia, Nilai, Negeri Sembilan, Malaysia
- Website: www.usim.edu.my

Universiti Sains Islam Malaysia (lit. 'Islamic Science University of Malaysia'; Arabic: جامعة العلوم الإسلامية الماليزية; abbreviated as USIM) is an Islamic university in Nilai, Seremban, Negeri Sembilan, which is fully owned and funded by the Malaysian government. Being the 12th Public Institution of Higher Learning (Malay: Institusi Pengajian Tinggi Awam; IPTA), it aims to spearhead knowledge and be the global reference centre for Islamic science.

== History ==
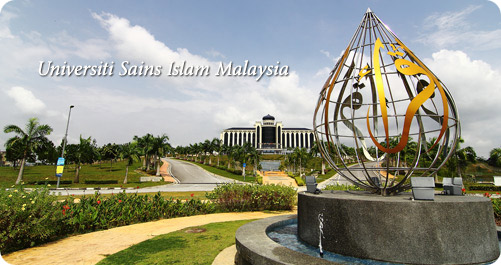
USIM Campus, Bandar Baru Nilai, Negeri Sembilan

Kolej Universiti Islam Malaysia (KUIM; Islamic University College of Malaysia) was made a public university on 13 March 1998 and initially to be located at the former International Islamic University Malaysia (IIUM) campus in Petaling Jaya. The university started operation in January 2000 at the National University of Malaysia in Bangi. The first enrolment for KUIM began on 18 June 2000 in a temporary location at Institut Profesional Baitulmal, Kuala Lumpur. In January 2002, KUIM moved again to another temporary campus in Tower A and B, Persiaran MPAJ, Pandan Indah, Ampang Jaya, Selangor. On 15 July 2005, KUIM moved to its permanent campus at Nilai, while the medical faculty remained in Ampang, Selangor. KUIM was officially upgraded to university status and renamed as USIM on 1 February 2007 and granted autonomy status in 2015. As of 2023, USIM already registered up to 8,000 students.

== Aims ==
The objectives of USIM are to uphold Islamic studies, bring Islamic studies into the national main education stream, and emphasized the use of information technology in education and research systems. Focus is also put in mastering Arabic and English language as well as the national language.

=== Motto ===
"Berilmu, Berdisiplin Dan Bertakwa" (Knowledgeable, Disciplined and Devout)

== Permata Insan ==
Permata insan is a specialized educational initiative in Malaysia designed to identify and nurture gifted and talented Muslim students operated by Usim that is based on Al-quran and Al-Sunnah. There Are two main program for entering there that are "Program Perkhemahan Cuti Sekolah(PPCS)" And "Muhayyam Al-Abrar). Both program maintly come every year on School holiday.

== Gallery ==
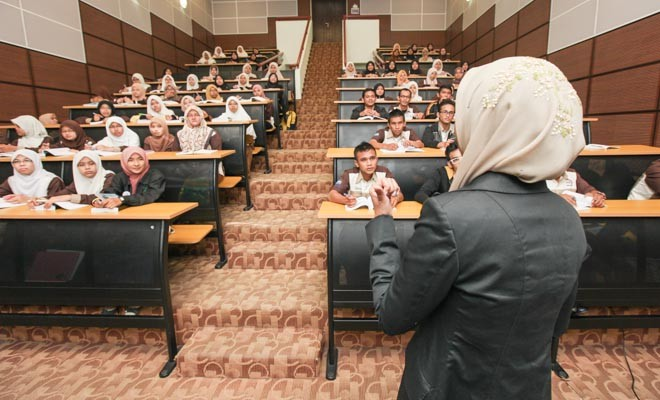
Lecture hall

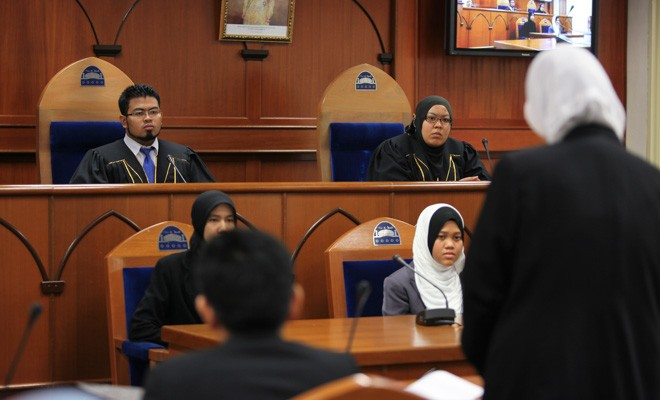
Moot court

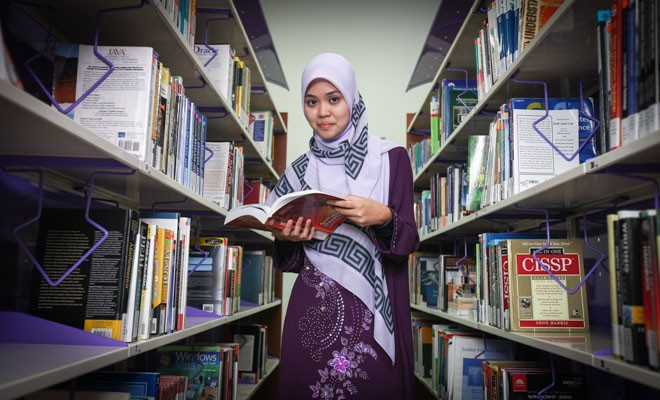
Library

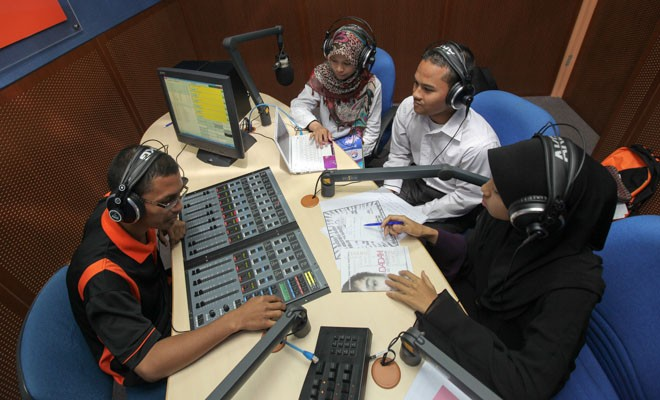
Radio studio

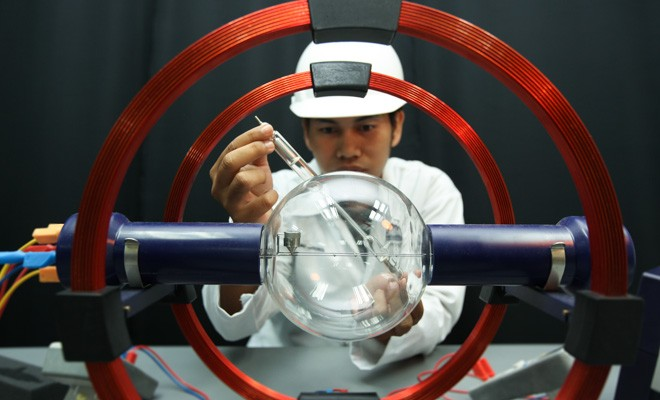
Science lab

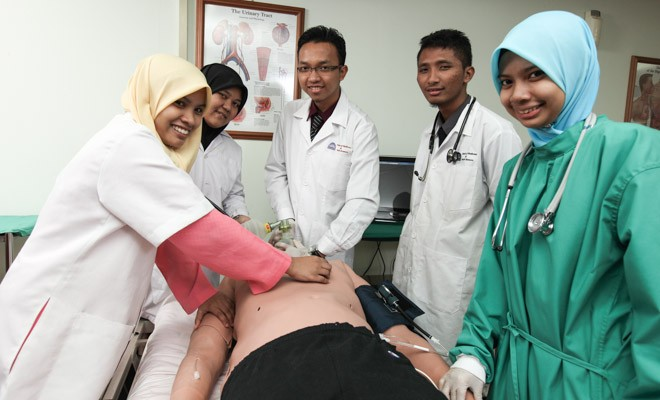
Medical lab

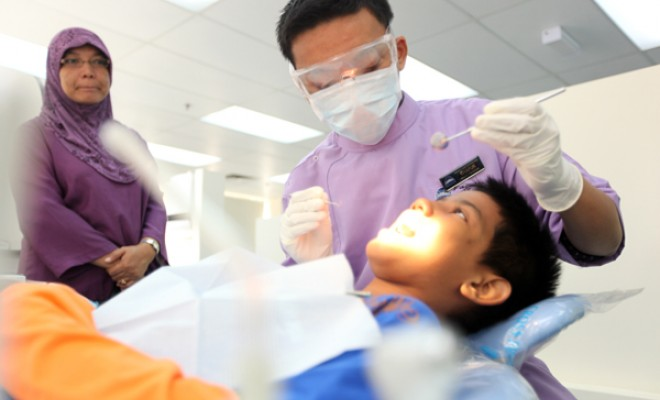
Dental lab

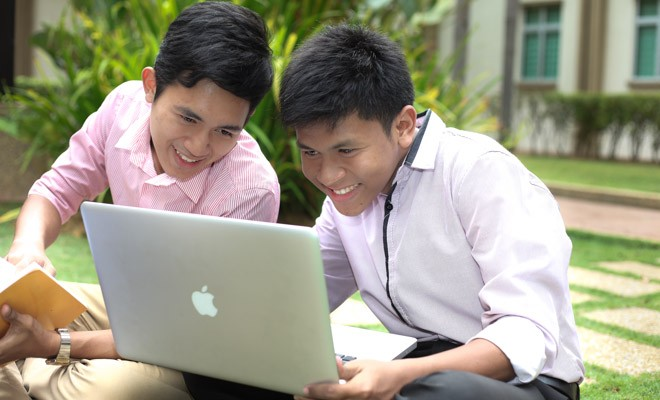
Campus Wifi

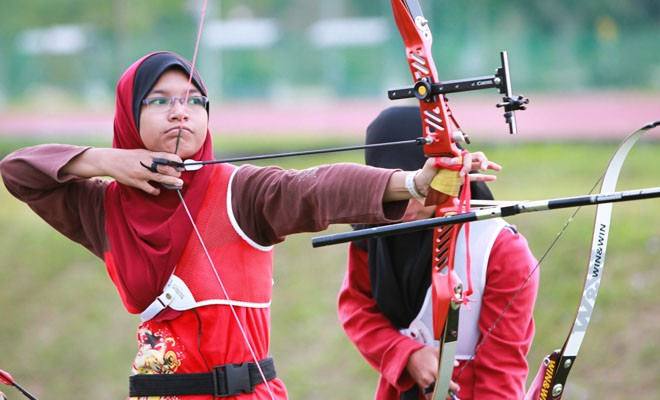
Sport activity

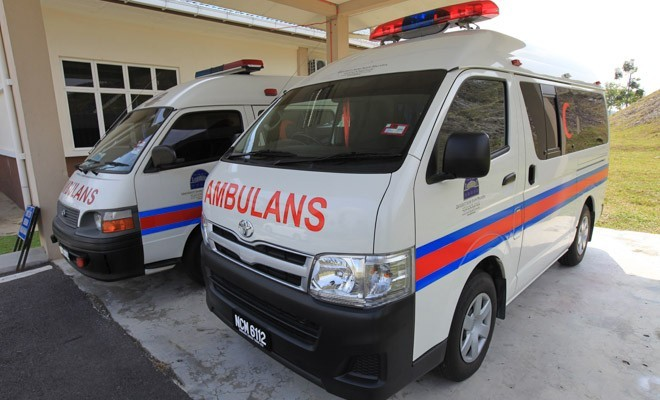
Health facility

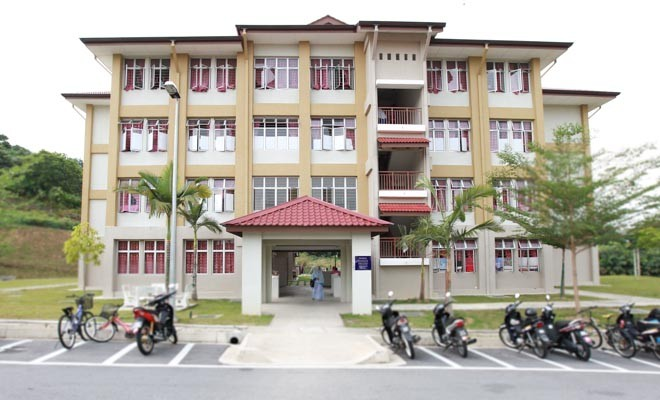
Students' residential college block

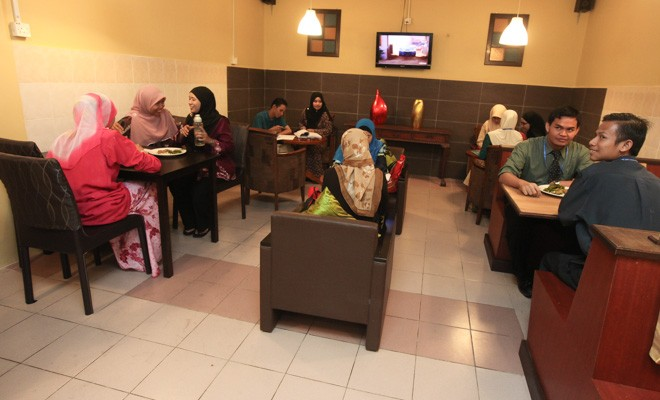
Cafeteria

== See also ==
- List of Islamic educational institutions
