= Nilai =

- Suburb of Seremban
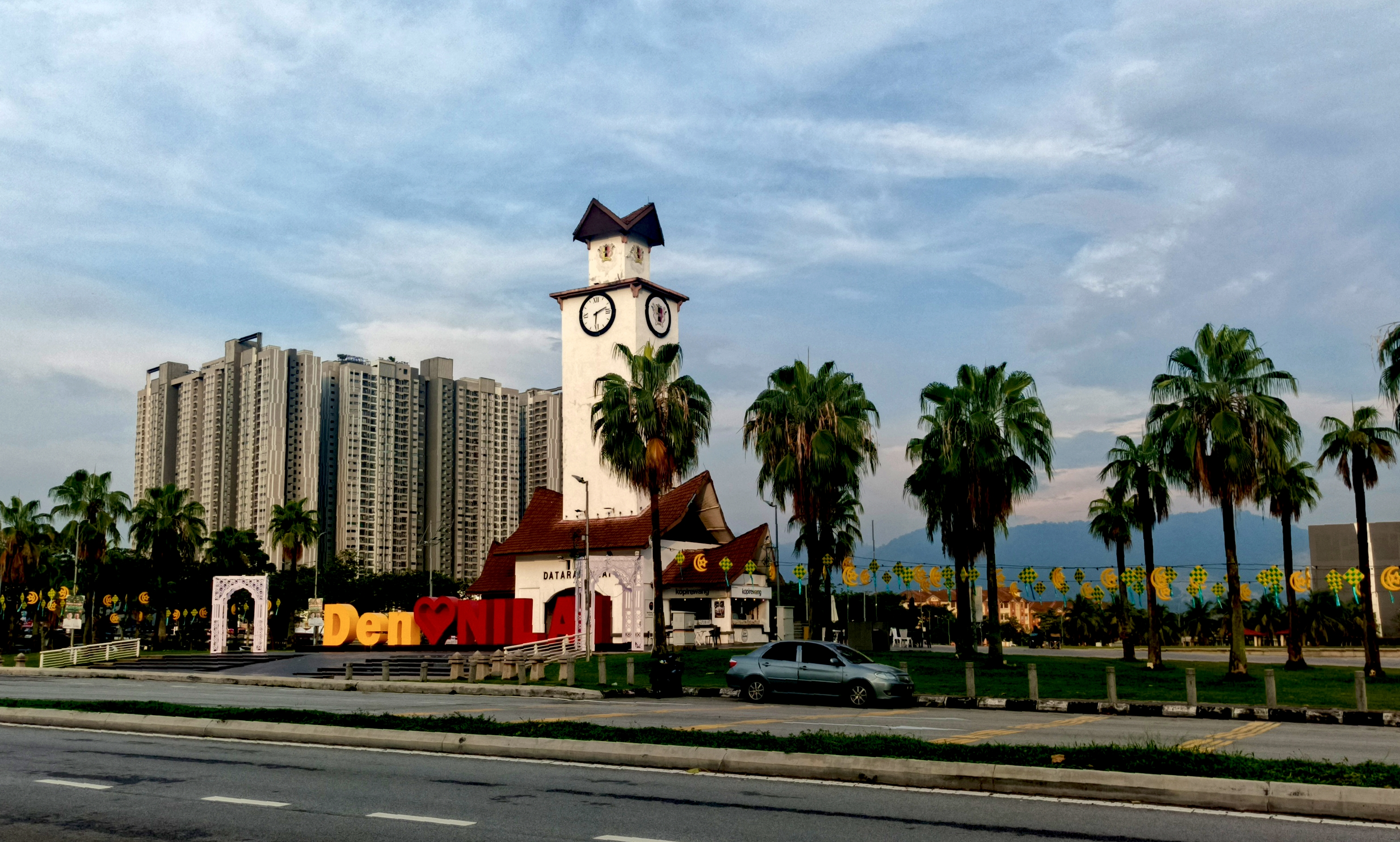
- Nilai Square and clock tower

- Location in Malaysia
- Coordinates: 2°49′N 101°48′E
- Country: Malaysia
- State: Negeri Sembilan
- District: Seremban
- Luak: Sungai Ujong
- Establishment: 1959
- Granted municipal status: 2002
- Incorporated: 2020

Government
  - Body: Seremban City Council
  - Mayor: Masri Baharuddin
  - Counsel: Abd. Halim Abd. Latif
  - MP: Anthony Loke (PH–DAP)
  - MLA: Arul Kumar Jambunathan (PH–DAP)

Population (2010)
  - Total: 38,612
- Postal code: 71800

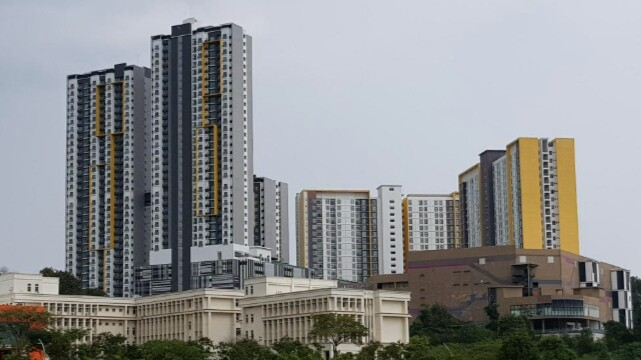
MesaHill integrated development with MILA University campus in the foreground

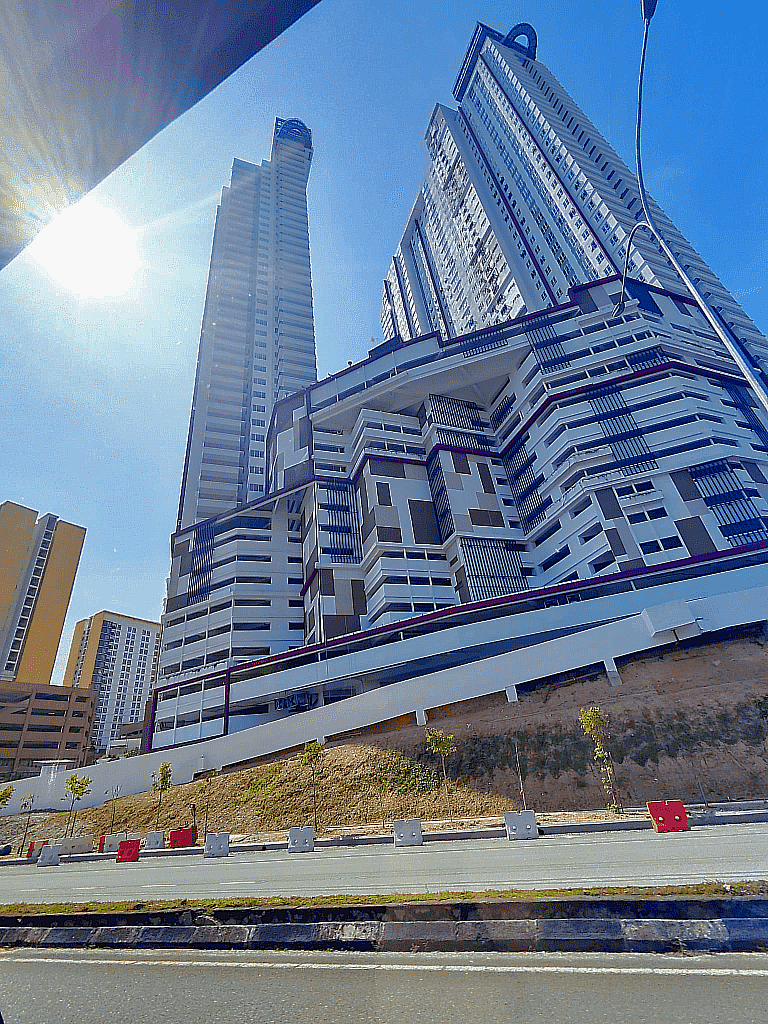
At 163 metres tall, the MesaHill Premier are the tallest twin residential skyscrapers in Negeri Sembilan

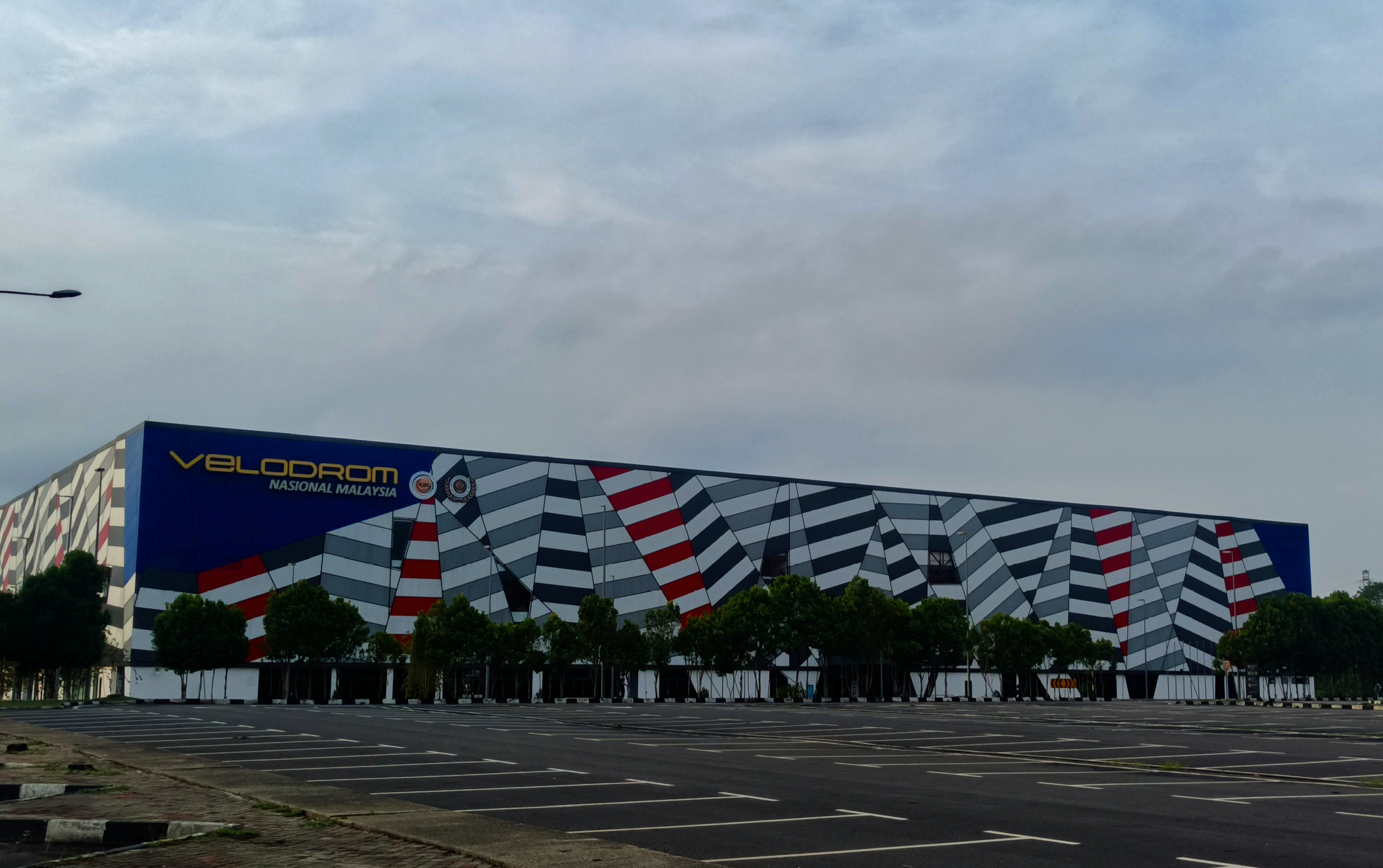
National Velodrome

Nilai is a city located in the Seremban District of the state of Negeri Sembilan, Malaysia, located close to the border with Selangor. It is the northern suburb within the Seremban metropolitan area, as well as part of the Greater Kuala Lumpur metropolitan area.

Due to its proximity to the Kuala Lumpur International Airport, it is a rapidly growing city. Nilai is almost halfway between the state capital Seremban and Kajang, Selangor, and lies on the railway linking these two cities. It is also the southern terminus of MSC Malaysia and the northern anchor of the Malaysia Vision Valley corridor.

Development projects can be seen as one drive around Nilai. Some of Malaysia's most well-known colleges and two universities are located in Nilai: Nilai University, INTI International University, Manipal International University, Universiti Sains Islam Malaysia and Islamic University College of Malaysia. As a result, the town is occupied by students from all over the world.

Nilai has become a popular shopping town with the establishment of several major shopping malls such as the Nilai 3 Wholesale Centre, Nilai Square, Giant Hypermarket, 9Avenue, Lotus's and Econsave. MesaMall and AEON Mall Nilai are the newest additions, having been opened in 2017 and 2019 respectively.

Velodrom Nasional Malaysia, an indoor cycling velodrome, is also located in Nilai, having being opened in 2017. It regularly hosted several national and international cycling events, such as UCI Track World Cup and Southeast Asian Games.

Nilai also has several activity-oriented attractions such as Dataran Nilai, Taman Awam Nilai, GEMBOX, and Melati Hill around the city center area, as well as Taman Tasik Ujana and TheParc in Nilai Impian.

== Etymology ==
The word Nilai means value in Malay. During the British colonial rule, it was known as Sepang Road.

== History ==
=== Founding ===
Nilai has its own unique origin and history. Historically, Nilai was under luak Sungai Ujong administered by waris di Darat or waris di Air. Under Dato’ Johan from waris di Darat three Dato’ Lingkungan controls the 3 corak suku Batu Hampar concentrated in a few villages. Other lines including those from Bentan that are not based on suku, but are based on the village where they live. As a Lembaga waris Perut Hulu, Waris Telaga Undang Dato’ Johan is not a titian balai because Dato’ Andika is more senior. However, the power endowed by Dato’ Kelana Putera to collect tax until the year 1894 shows that the Dato’ Johan position concerning balai Undang is important.

The third Dato’ Johan, Dato’ Maamor is the Dato’ Kelana Putra, the 8th Undang Luak Sungai Ujong. Even while being appointed as Pesaka Dato' Kelana Putera, Dato’ Maamor is still a child. At that time, Pesaka Dato' Kelana Putera position is left vacant since 1887 when Dato' Mohd Yusof, the Undang Luak Sungai Ujong is relieved from duty. Because waris Perut Hulu does not have a son to hold the pesaka, the anak-anak buah unanimously appointed Dato’ Maamor who was still a child hold the pesaka Dato' Johan and then titled Dato’ Kelana.

Dato’ Johan's jurisdiction also covers Lenggeng Mukim which includes Mendum Village, Lenggeng Village, Sungai Jai Village, Hulu Beranang Village and Dacing Village. All these villages have their own ketua adat called ‘Tua Waris’. There are also suku of Minangkabau people concentrated on other luak in Negeri Sembilan before settling in Lenggeng Village. To ensure their welfare in Luak Sungai Ujong, all suku was given ‘Tua Waris’ to be their representative in matters relating to tradition and administration in Balai Undang Luak.

== Climate ==
The Köppen-Geiger climate classification system classifies its climate as tropical rainforest (Af).

Climate data for Nilai
Month	Jan	Feb	Mar	Apr	May	Jun	Jul	Aug	Sep	Oct	Nov	Dec	Year
Mean daily maximum °C (°F)	31 (88)	31.7 (89.1)	32.3 (90.1)	32.1 (89.8)	31.7 (89.1)	31.5 (88.7)	31.2 (88.2)	31.1 (88.0)	31.3 (88.3)	31.2 (88.2)	31.1 (88.0)	31 (88)	31.4 (88.6)
Daily mean °C (°F)	26.5 (79.7)	27.1 (80.8)	27.4 (81.3)	27.6 (81.7)	27.5 (81.5)	27.2 (81.0)	26.9 (80.4)	26.9 (80.4)	27 (81)	27 (81)	27 (81)	26.7 (80.1)	27.1 (80.8)
Mean daily minimum °C (°F)	22.1 (71.8)	22.5 (72.5)	22.6 (72.7)	23.2 (73.8)	23.4 (74.1)	23 (73)	22.7 (72.9)	22.8 (73.0)	22.7 (72.9)	22.8 (73.0)	22.9 (73.2)	22.5 (72.5)	22.8 (73.0)
Average precipitation mm (inches)	149 (5.9)	137 (5.4)	213 (8.4)	246 (9.7)	184 (7.2)	119 (4.7)	123 (4.8)	152 (6.0)	169 (6.7)	249 (9.8)	263 (10.4)	219 (8.6)	2,223 (87.6)
Source: Climate-Data.org (altitude: 50m)

== Demographics ==
Chinese make up the majority of the population at 46%, followed by the Malays at 31%, and Indians at 22%.

== Education ==
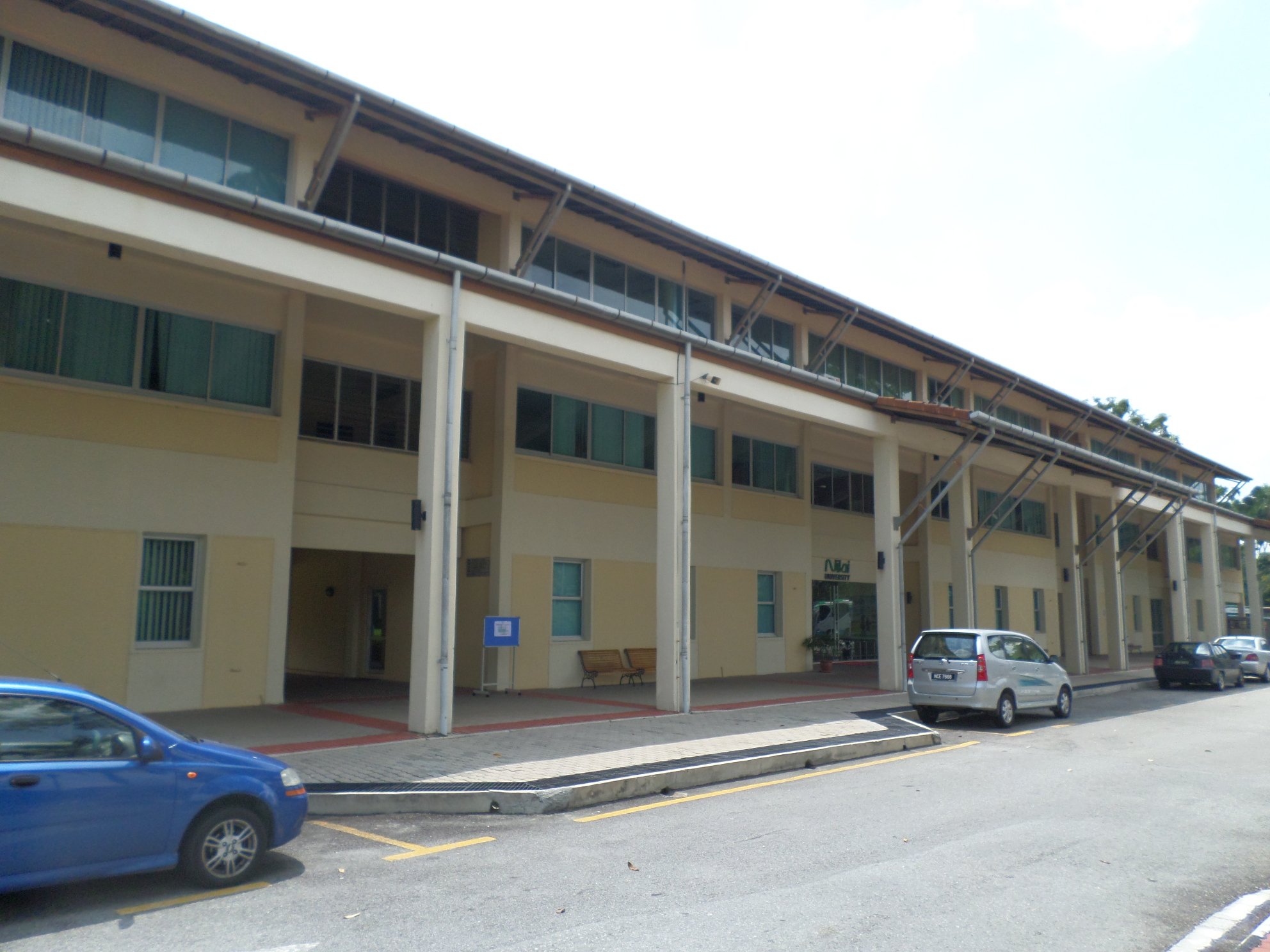
Nilai University

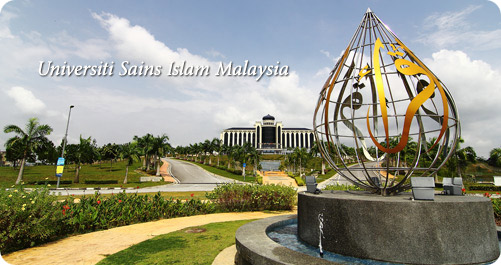
Islamic Science University of Malaysia

The state government's initiative to turn Negeri Sembilan into an educational hub has also borne fruit as several foreign and local institutions of higher education have agreed to set up operations here.

Among them are Britain's Epsom College which has acquired land in Bandar Enstek to set up its first institute outside England, Epsom College in Malaysia and the City University College of Science and Technology which signed an agreement to acquire a 40 ha parcel of land here recently. Another offshore campus is the MILA University (known as the Manipal International University prior to 2023).

The state would also benefit from the construction of the RM1.2B Education Ministry complex which would, among others, house the Aminuddin Baki Institute, Institut Pendidikan Guru Kampus Pendidikan Teknik, English Language Institute, Tunku Kurshiah College and Nilai Polytechnic as well as the International Islamic University Malaysia’s medical faculty and the International University College of Nursing.

Several institutions of higher learning that have been built in the area include Nilai University, INTI International University and Universiti Sains Islam Malaysia.

== Transportation ==
Nilai Bus Station

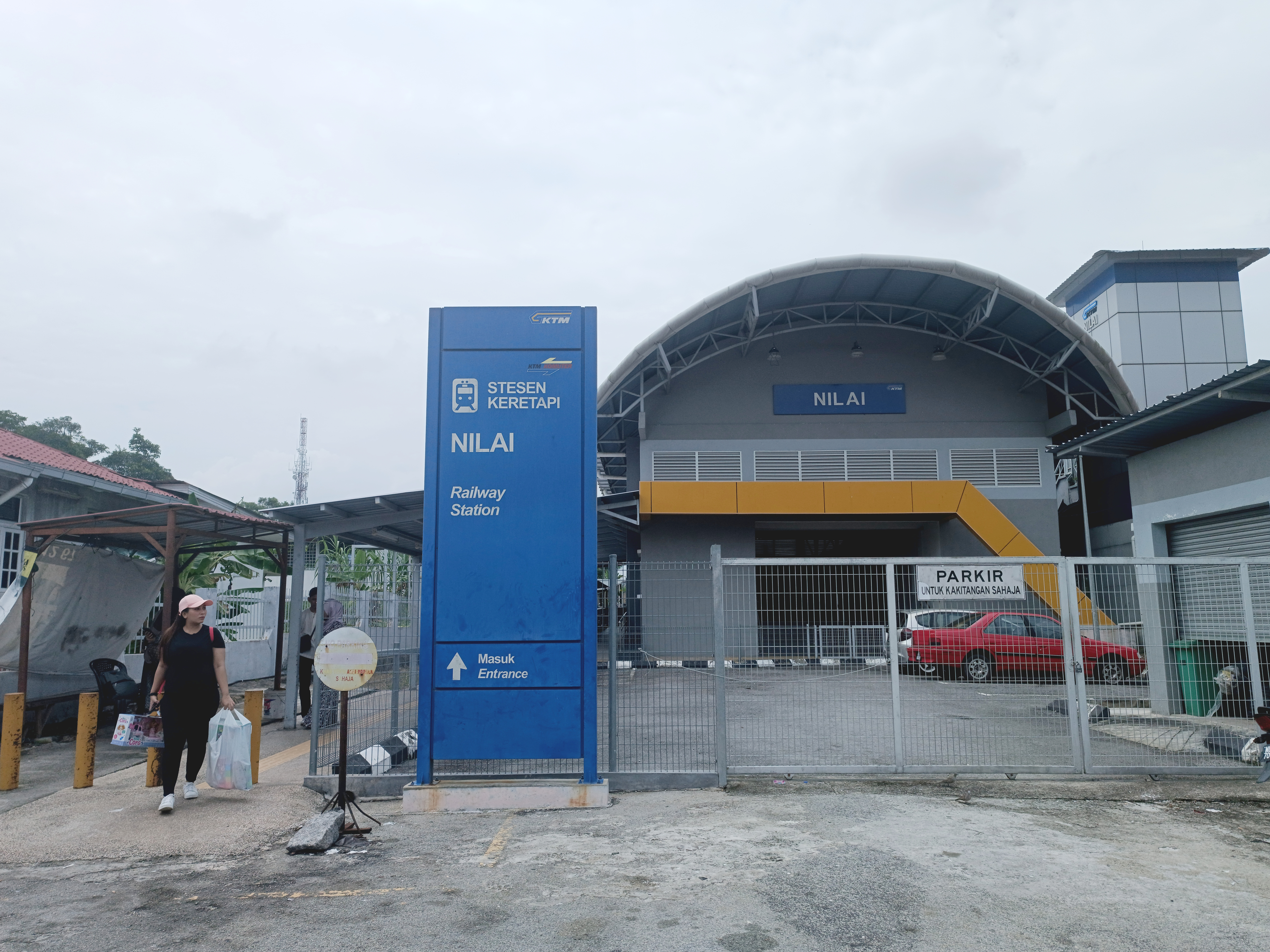
Nilai Komuter station

=== Car ===
PLUS Expressway exit 214 serves Nilai. Nilai is also the southern end of ELITE which connects it to Shah Alam, the capital of Selangor. Motorists from western Selangor are thus able to get to Negeri Sembilan, Malacca or Johor while bypassing Kuala Lumpur.

=== Rail ===
KTM Komuter has two stations serving Nilai constituency: Batang Benar and Nilai.

Buses are available from Nilai Komuter station to the nearby KLIA.

=== University transportation ===
Bus service will be provided to INTI International University students and Nilai University students for free to different destinations according to the universities' timetable. Students can go to Giant, Tesco or KTM station by referring to the timetable.

== Politics ==
Nilai is part of the Seremban constituency of the Dewan Rakyat of the Malaysian Parliament, currently represented by Anthony Loke Siew Fook of the Democratic Action Party.

On the provincial level, Nilai is represented in the Negeri Sembilan State Legislative Assembly by Arul Kumar a/l Jambunathan, also from the Democratic Action Party.
