= Ohio National University =

Former division of Franklin University

Ohio National University was a division of Franklin University which opened in 2015. It offered online programs primarily focused on international students.

== History ==
Ohio National University was a division of Franklin University from 2015-2017 that offered online degree programs primarily focused on international students. This division has been consolidated, and programs previously available through Ohio National University are now available through Franklin University.

Franklin University is accredited by The Higher Learning Commission and authorized by the Ohio Department of Higher Education (formerly known as the Ohio Board of Regents) to offer and confer college degrees at undergraduate and graduate levels of study. The Higher Learning Commission is one of six regional accrediting bodies recognized by the U.S. Department of Education and the Council for Higher Education Accreditation (CHEA).
