= Sembilanbelas November University =

Public university in Kolaka, Sulawesi

Universitas Sembilanbelas November
- Type: Public University
- Established: 16 April 1984 (sebagai STKIP Kolaka); 8 Juni 2005 (As Universitas 19 November)
- Parent institution: Ministry of Higher Education, Science, and Technology
- Rector: Dr. H. Nur Ihsan HL., M.Hum .
- Location: Kolaka, Southeast Sulawesi, Indonesia
- Campus: Urban
- Website: usn.ac.id

Sembilanbelas November University Kolaka (Indonesian: Universitas Sembilanbelas November Kolaka, abbreviated as USN Kolaka) is a public university in Kolaka, Southeast Sulawesi.

== History ==
USN Kolaka was formed on November 19, 1984, and was originally called the Kolaka November 19th Education and Teaching State College (Indonesian: Sekolah Tinggi Keguruan dan Ilmu Pendidikan 19 Nopember Kolaka (STKIP). The date was chosen to commemorate the date of the Kolaka incident. The state college became a university in 2005, based on a decree released by the Indonesian Ministry of Education. It also changed its name to November 19 University Kolaka (Indonesian: Universitas 19 November Kolaka) In Indonesia, the institution became a public university (Indonesian: Perguruan Tinggi Negeri), and from that moment on, the institution is known by its current name, which it has retained since it became a public university.

== Logo and philosophy ==
The logo of UNS Kolaka comprises several aspects, each with its own meaning:

1. Five flower petals, indicating Pancasila.
2. A star, indicating the desire and drive to learn and create for the sake of society and scientific development.
3. Twenty grains of paddy rice and fourteen pieces of cotton, indicating the year when USN Kolaka became a public university.
4. An eagle head with four combs and two wings, indicating the day and month when USN Kolaka became a public university.
5. A monument, indicating the historical significance of the university’s name.
6. An opened book, indicating the value of science and technology for society.
7. A ribbon with university name emblazoned, indicating the unity of the university.

== Academics ==
=== Faculties ===
USN Kolaka has six faculties and thirty programs. Students attending the following programs will receive a bachelor’s degree, with the exception of nursing students, since their program is only at the level of an associate degree. These are the following faculties and programs available at USN Kolaka:

==== Faculty of Teaching and Education Science ====
- Indonesian Language Education
- English Language Education
- Mathematics Education
- Geography Education
- Sports Education
- Pancasila Education
- Biology Education
- Chemistry Education
- Physics Education

==== Faculty of Animal Husbandry and Fisheries ====
- Agribusiness
- Agrotechnology
- Fisheries Science
- Animal Husbandry
- Marine Science
- Agricultural Product Technology

==== Faculty of Science and Technology ====
- Mining Engineering
- Civil Engineering
- Chemistry
- Mathemathics
- Machine Engineering
- Naval Engineering
- Pharmacy
- Nursing

==== Faculty of Social and Political Science ====
- Public Administration
- Management
- Accounting
- Economic Development

==== Faculty of Law ====
- Law

==== Faculty of Information and Technology ====
- Information Science
- Computer Science

=== Ranking ===
According to Webometrics 2021 Report, the university is currently ranked 390th in Indonesia.
