= Hanoi University of Public Health =

Hanoi University of Public Health (Vietnamese: Trường Đại học Y tế công cộng) is a university in Vietnam specializing in Public Health Training and Research. It was established in 2001. The university is located at Thang Road, Dong Ngac Ward, Hanoi.
