= MILA University =

University in Malaysia

Coordinates: 2.8215°N 101.7782°E

MILA University is a private university located at Putra Nilai, Negeri Sembilan, Malaysia. The university offers multidisciplinary programmes with a focus in the fields of science, engineering and management & business. It is part of the China-Malaysia International College through Haikou University of Economics.

MILA University is recognized by the Malaysian Ministry of Higher Education and it is accredited by the Malaysian Qualifications Agency (MQA). It is also recognized by the Medical Council of India, the General Medical Council of the United Kingdom, and the Australian Medical Council.

== History ==
Originally known as Manipal International University and owned by Manipal Group of Institutions, its Nilai campus opened in 2011. A green technology campus, it was built to comply with the Leed Platinum Building Index.

In 2023, Manipal International University was acquired by The Shenzhen International Tre (Hainan) Co. Ltd. The renaming of Manipal International University to its current name was approved on 16 October 2023. Later, the new owners made major reforms and renovated and improved the existing campus buildings.
