= CamEd Business School =

Business school in Cambodia

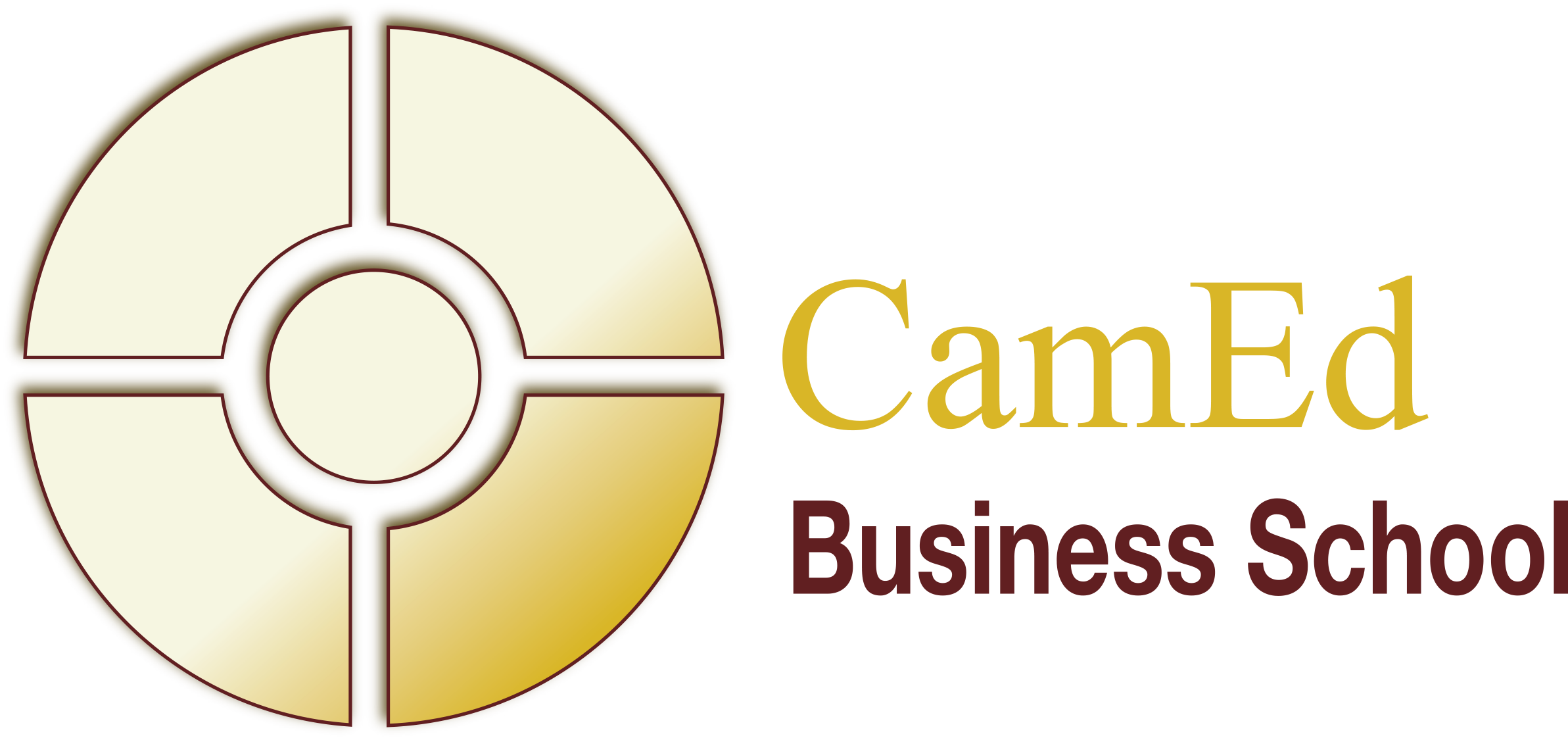
- Other names: CamEd Institute
- Type: Private Institute of Higher Education
- Established: 2000; 26 years ago
- Academic affiliations: Association of Chartered Certified Accountants (ACCA); ASEAN University Network (AUN); Harvard Microeconomics of Competitiveness Network; CFA University Affiliate Program
- Chairman: Prum Virak
- Rector: Casey Barnett
- Academic staff: 345
- Undergraduates: 2,242
- Postgraduates: 2,760; 381 (ACCA); 137 (CAT)
- Location: Phnom Penh, Cambodia; 11.569°N 104.8914°E
- Colors: Oxblood, Gold
- Website: cam-ed.edu.kh

CamEd Business School (/ˈkæm.ɛd/), also known as CamEd Institute, is an institute of higher education in Phnom Penh, Cambodia. It specializes in teaching accounting and finance and is a primary source of new hires for major audit firms in Cambodia.

Increasingly, CamEd graduates are dominating the ranks of new hires for banks, investment companies and the Cambodian General Department of Taxation.

CamEd works closely with the National Accounting Council of Cambodia and the Association of Chartered Certified Accountants to provide internationally recognized examinations. CamEd bases its curriculum on the educational requirements of the International Federation of Accountants (IFAC) and the CFA institute candidate body of knowledge. Courses are taught in English language and teach International Financial Reporting Standards (IFRS), International Financial Reporting Standards for Small and Medium Sized Entities (IFRS for SMEs), and International Standards of Auditing (ISAs).

== History ==
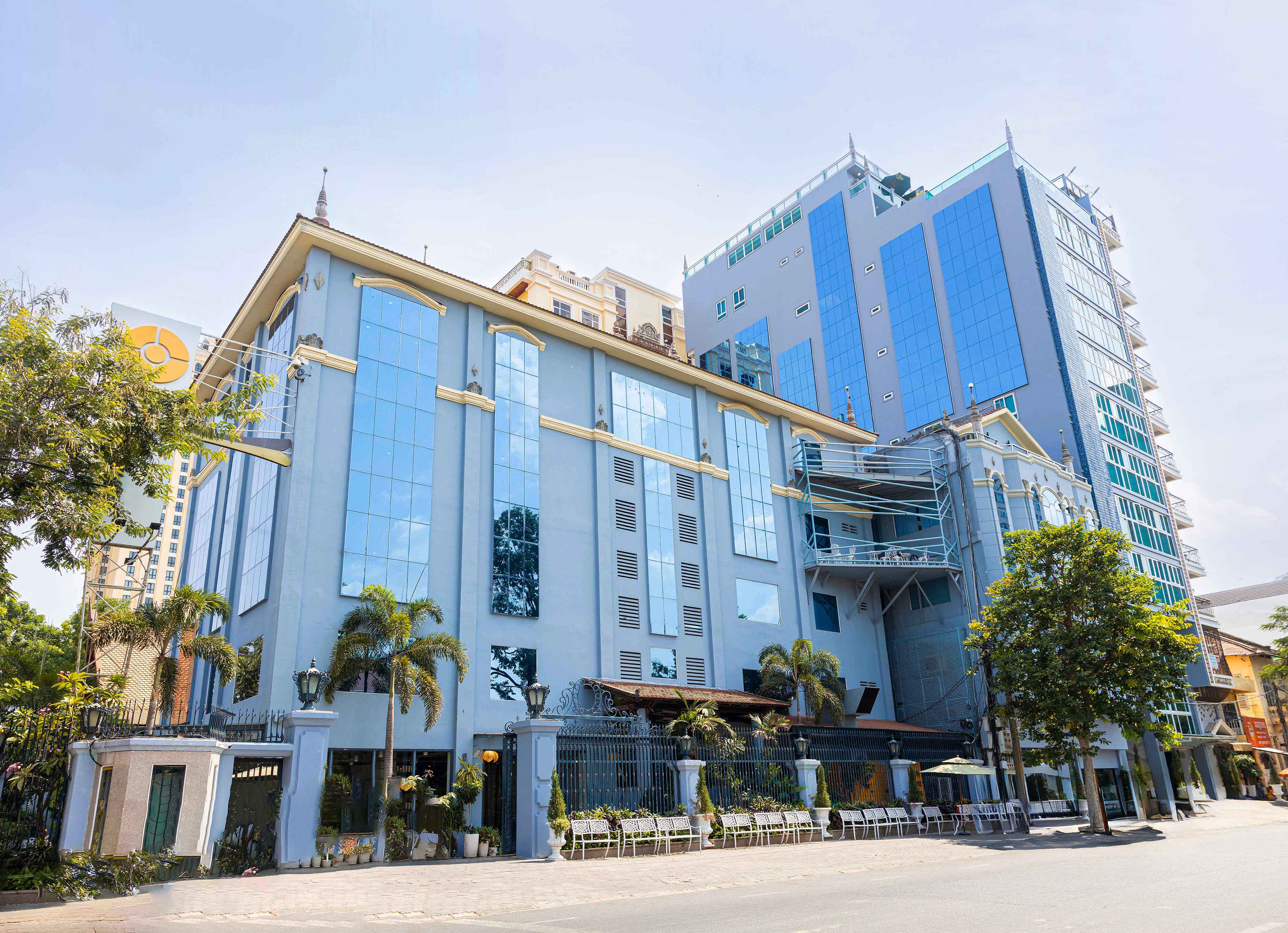
The main buildings of CamEd Business School

After the end of the Cambodian civil war in 1998, there was an urgent need to build business skills to develop the Cambodian economy. CamEd was established soon after in the year 2000 as a professional training organization for international companies and organizations. In 2003 CamEd began teaching for the international ACCA accounting qualifications. This coincided with the passage of a new law on accounting that was issued in the year 2003 which required professional licensure for accounting and auditing services. In 2010, CamEd was accredited as an institute of higher education with degree granting powers. In the same year, CamEd received a gold quality rating, the highest level of quality approval from the international ACCA. CamEd remains the only institute or university in Cambodia with quality recognition from the ACCA.

Within the higher education regulatory framework of Cambodia, CamEd is an “institute”. In Cambodia, regulations require “universities” to offer degrees in a broad range of subjects and majors across multiple colleges or faculties. In contrast, “institutes” are allowed to offer degrees of higher education in a narrower range of subjects. CamEd is an institute which specializes in teaching accounting and finance. Based in Phnom Penh, and is Cambodia's leading institute of higher education in the fields of accounting and finance. More than 50% of the annual recruits of the big four audit firms in Cambodia (PwC, Deloitte, KPMG, and EY) are students or graduates of CamEd.

== Academics ==
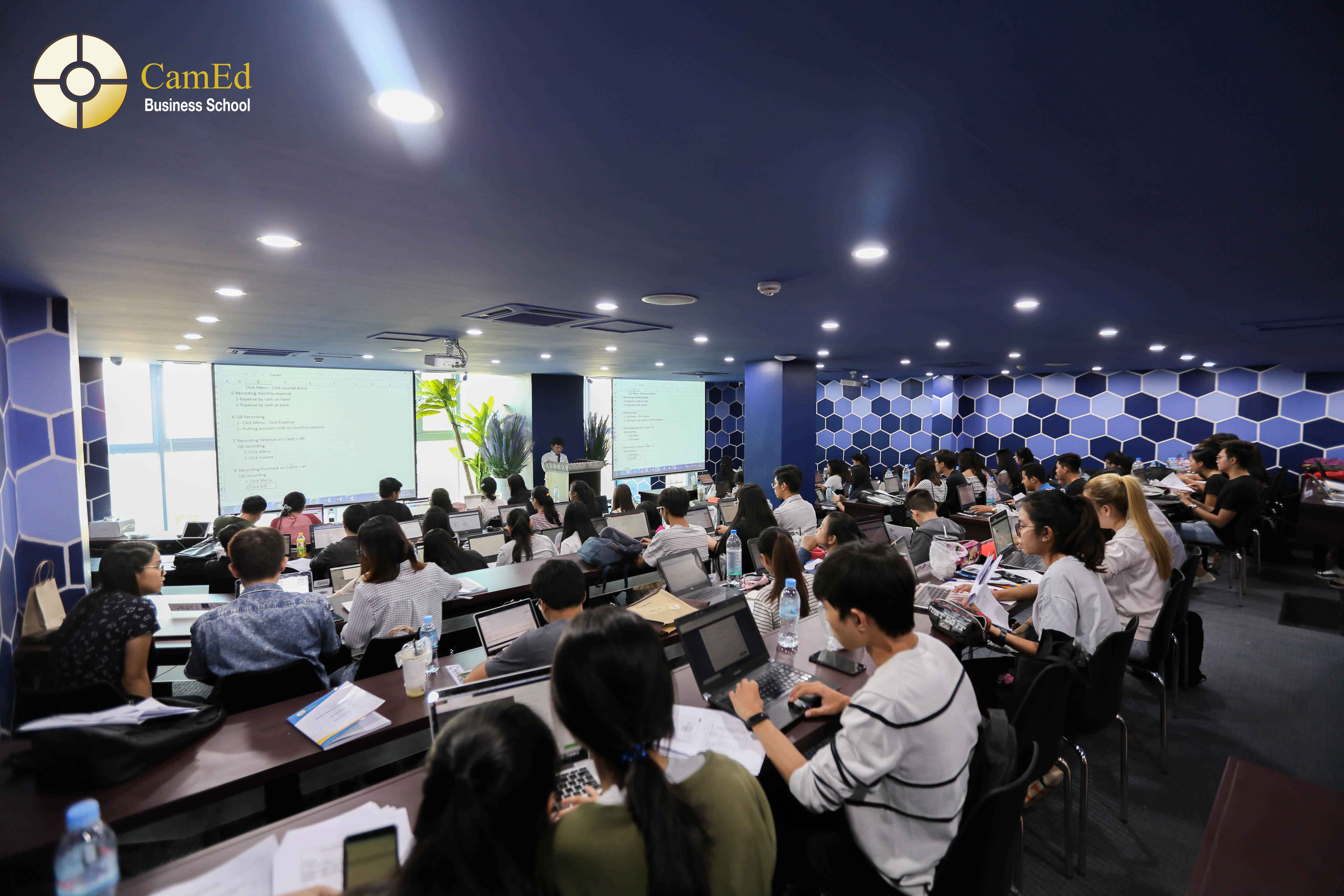
The Richard Thaler Lecture Hall at CamEd Business School.

CamEd provides education and training leading to a Bachelor of Accounting and Finance (Honours), the ACCA qualification, the CAT qualification, a Diploma in Cambodian Tax, and a Diploma in Cambodian Business Law

The Bachelor of Accounting and Finance (Honours) is the only academic degree offered by CamEd. Therefore, this program receives full attention and support of management, academic staff, support staff, financial resources and facilities.

The program follows the curriculum requirements of the International Federation of Accountants (IFAC), supplemented with additional courses to develop well rounded professionals. Some of the IFAC requirements are fulfilled by incorporating certain ACCA professional exam syllabuses. For several program courses, students sit examinations that are independently written and marked by the ACCA in the UK.

== Recognition ==
CamEd was granted accreditation as an institute of higher education by the sub-decree on accreditation No. 74 អនក្រ.បក signed by the Prime Minister of Cambodia on 23 July 2010.CamEd received accreditation for the Foundation Year of its Bachelor of Accounting and Finance (Honours) from the Accreditation Committee of Cambodia. CamEd is a Platinum approved learning provider of the international Association of Chartered Certified Accountants (ACCA). Platinum status is the highest level of quality recognition provided by the ACCA.

CamEd is an official CFA University Affiliate partner, incorporating at least 70% of the CFA candidate body of knowledge in the Bachelor of Accounting and Finance (Honours). CamEd is an affiliate member of the ASEAN University Network. CamEd is a member of the Harvard Microeconomics of Competitiveness network. CamEd is an official computer based testing center for the ACCA for both on-demand examinations as well as for the ACCA applied skills examinations. CamEd is an official testing center for the British Council APTIS English language assessments.

== Library and resources ==
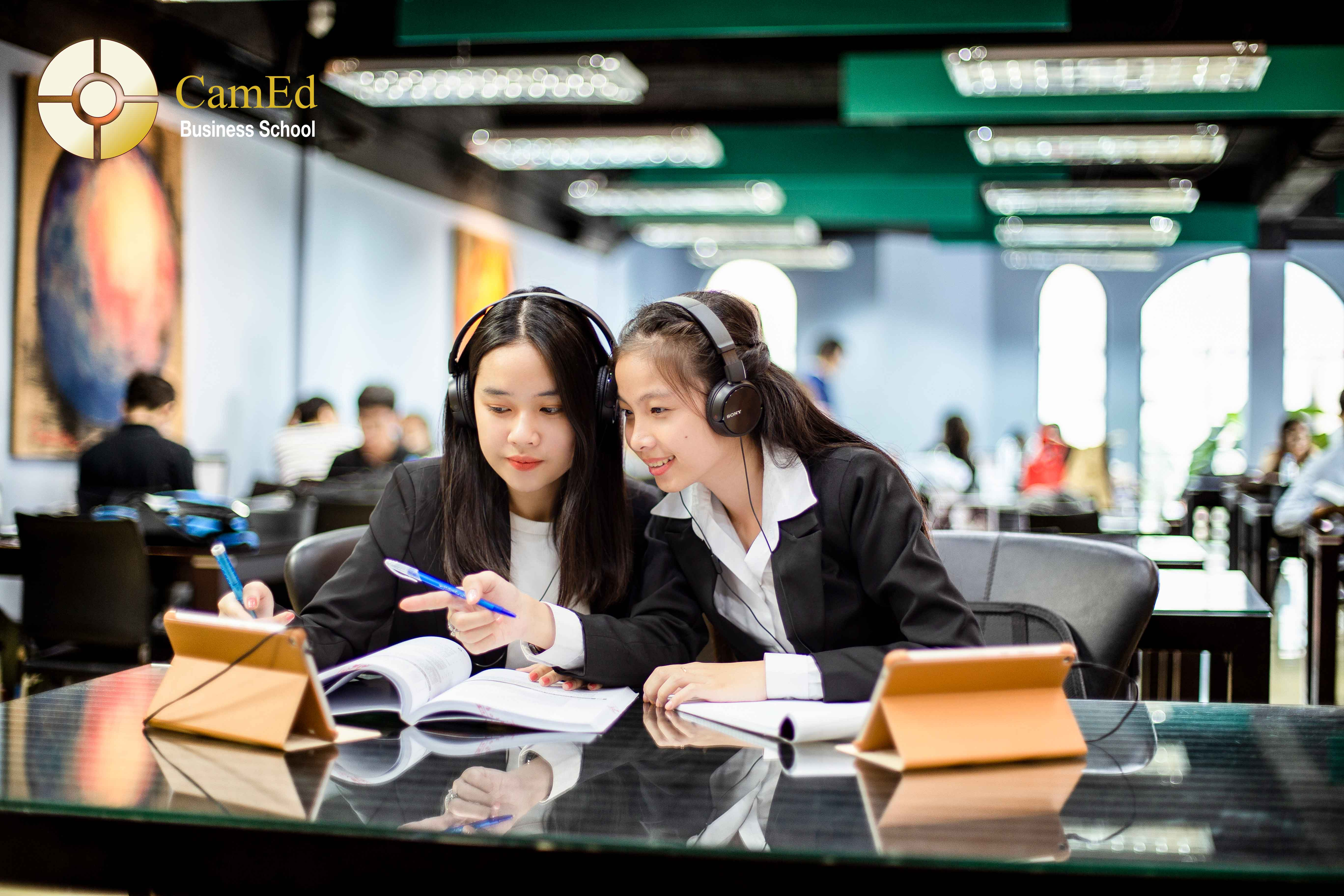
Students watching video lectures in the CamEd Business Library

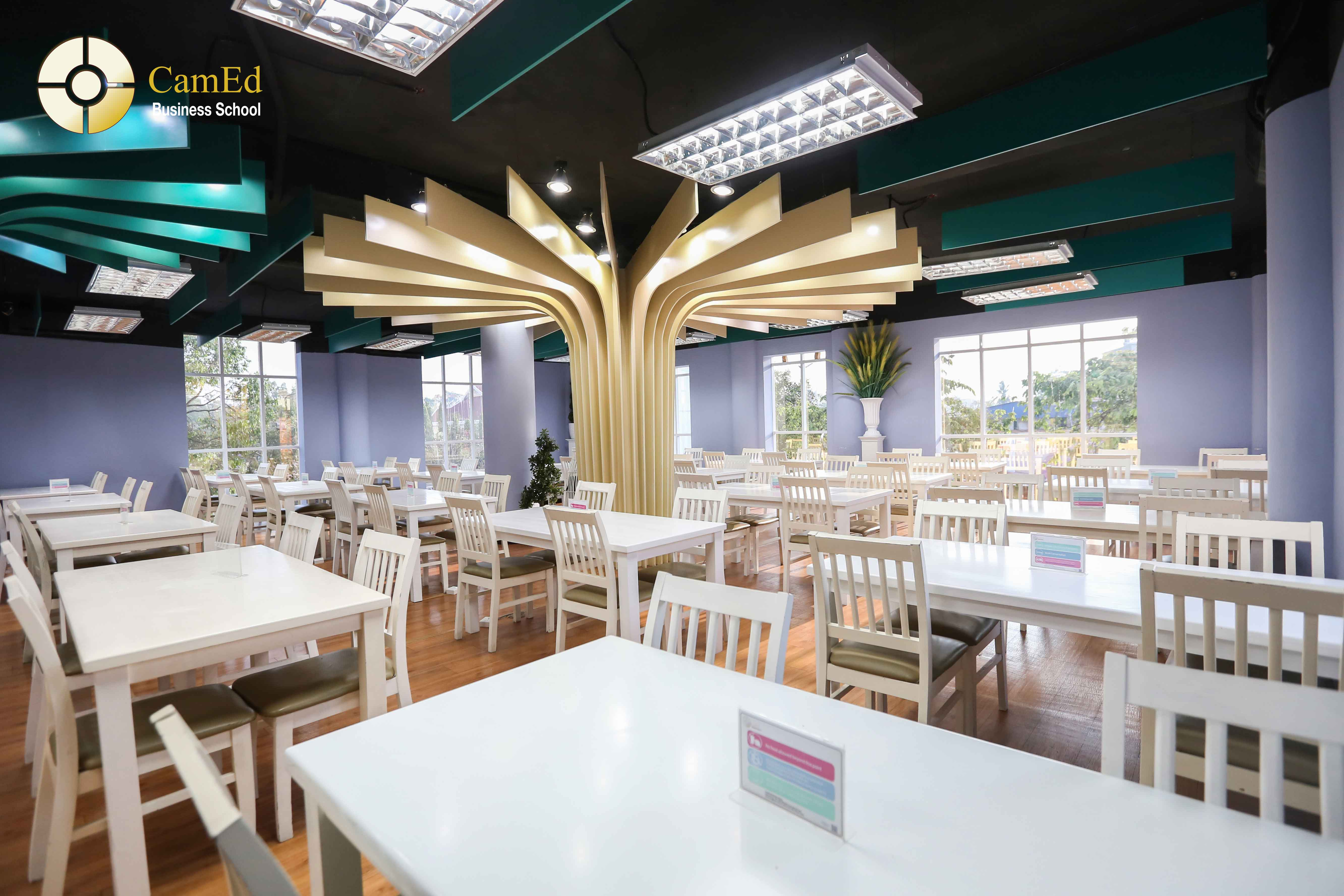
The Reading Room at CamEd Business School

The CamEd Business Library caters to the needs of students and academic staff in the fields of business, finance and accounting.

In addition to the library's print collection, the library is supported by a robust website and digital collection. The library has subscribed to over 10+ databases, thousands of e-books, scholarly journals, research guides, videos, and over one million articles. The library digital resources includes government documents, trade publications, periodicals, multimedia content, and special collections which can be accessed by an unlimited number of users at one time and anywhere outside the CamEd campus via OneLogin and VPN access. The library website also has an e-catalog search function, which is enabled with an interlibrary loan request function. The library also allows students to check out laptops, tablets and e-book reading devices. Moreover, the library has available USBs with accounting learning software and hard drives for language lab programs. The library is open every day from 7:00 am until 9:00 p.m. including weekends and government holidays. In addition, the Library extends its hours until 11:00 p.m. during exam sessions

== Curriculum ==
The Bachelor of Accounting and Finance (Honours) curriculum is overseen by the CamEd Curriculum Committee. For the ACCA and CAT programs taught by CamEd, the curriculum is independently set by the ACCA. The Bachelor of Accounting and Finance (Honours) curriculum is developed following outcomes based education principles in which expected learning outcomes are established with review of stakeholder needs. Stakeholders include employers, alumni, the National Accounting Council, the Kampuchea Institute of Certified Public Accountants and Auditors and the General Department of Taxation.The program follows the curriculum requirements of the International Federation of Accountants (IFAC), supplemented with additional courses to develop well rounded professionals. Some of the IFAC requirements are fulfilled by incorporating certain ACCA professional exam syllabuses. For several program courses, students sit examinations that are independently written and marked by the ACCA in the UK.

== Student Employment ==
CamEd has achieved great success in placing its graduates with leading international companies in Cambodia. CamEd graduates greatly outnumber the graduates of other universities employed by major accounting firms. An independent graduate tracer study found that 28% of graduates were employed by PwC, 14% by KPMG, 12% by EY and 7% by Deloitte. Typical positions held by Bachelor of Accounting and Finance (Honours) graduates include that of auditor, tax accountant, tax consultant, internal auditor, and finance officer.

== Student Clubs ==
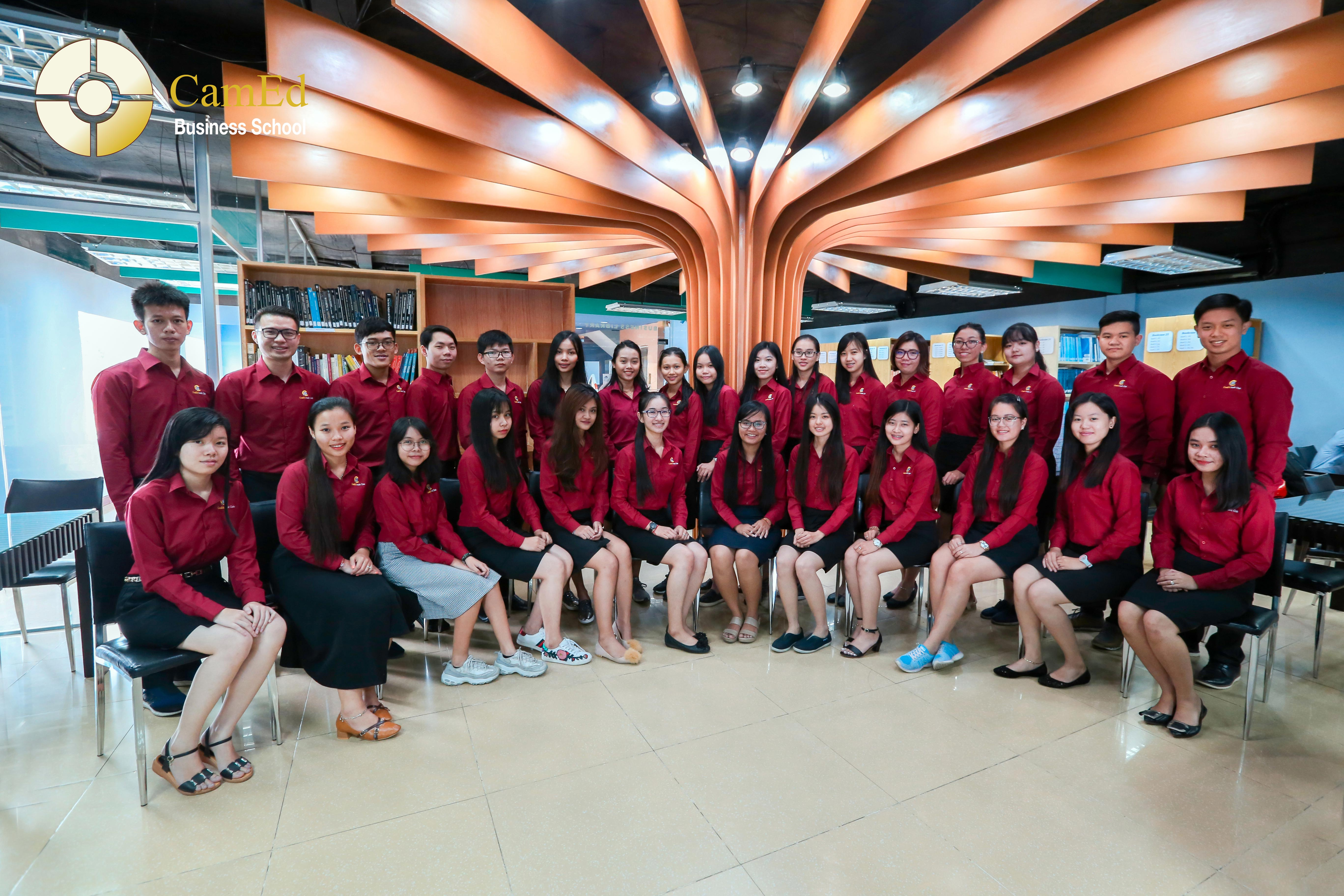
The CamEd Audit Club

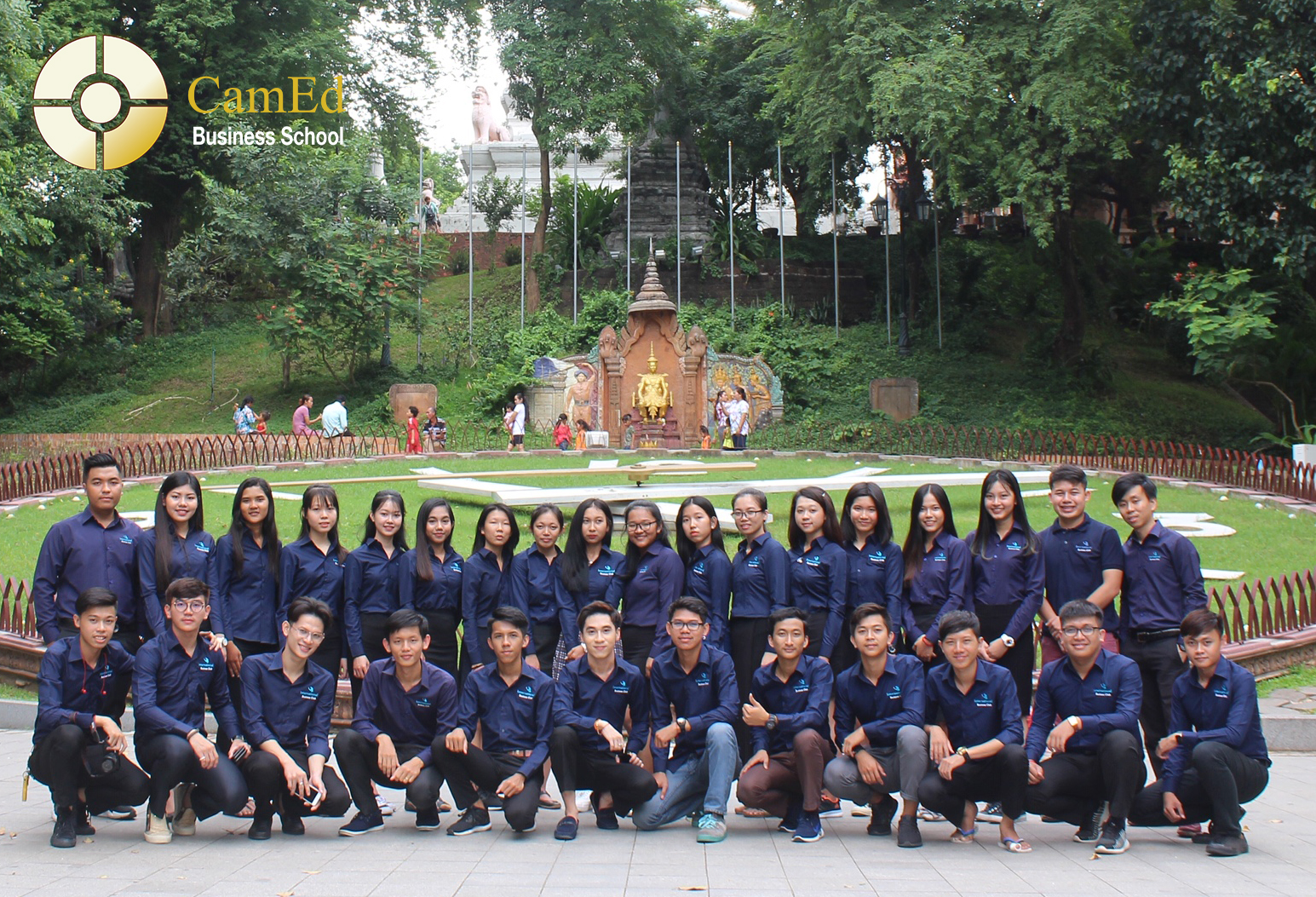
The CamEd International Business Club

At CamEd, student clubs and co-curricular activities are selected and encouraged in order to align with and support achievement of program learning outcomes. Student clubs are provided with matching funds financing and administrative support from the Student Life department. To ensure opportunities regardless of gender, CamEd has set a requirement that all clubs have student co-presidents, one of whom is a woman and one of whom is a man. There are 55 official student clubs including CamEd Student Government (CSG), CamEd International Business Club (CIBC), CamEd Audit Club (CAC), CamEd Investment Club (CIC), CamEd Entrepreneur Club (CEC), CamEd Sustainable Development Club (CSDC), CamEd Community Club (CCC) and the CamEd Public Speaking and Debate Club (CPSDC).

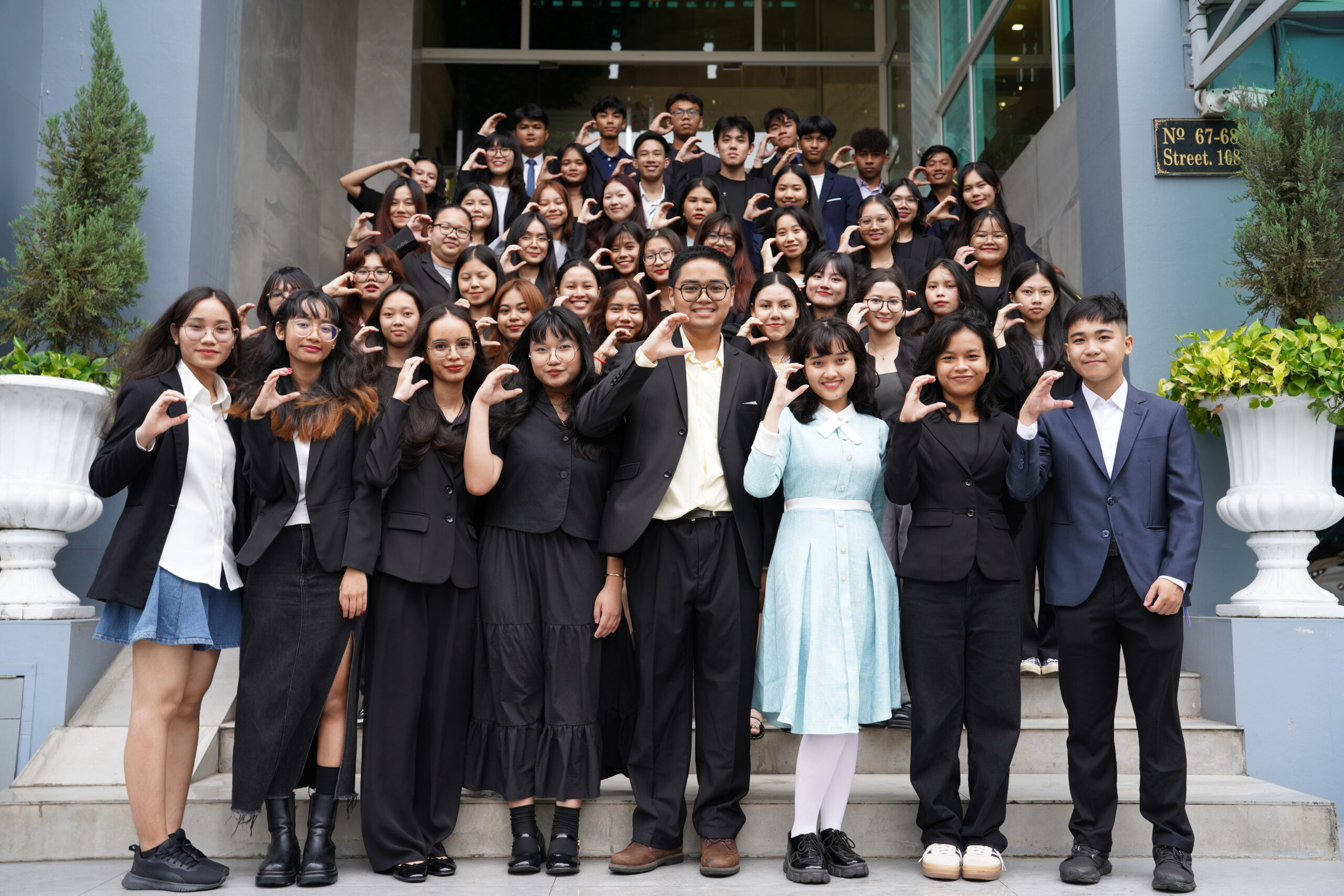
The CamEd Community Club

== Sports ==
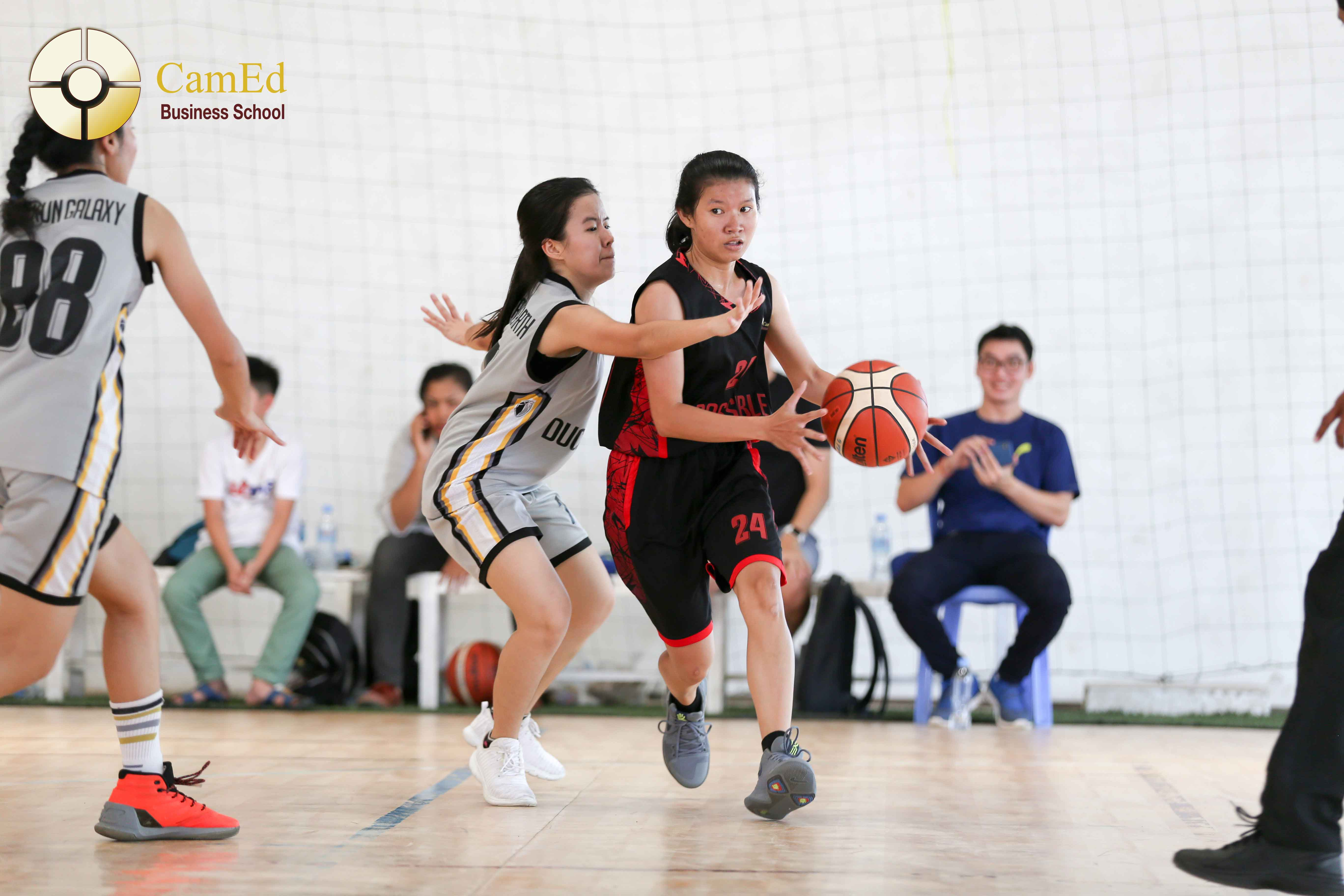
CamEd women's basketball at the annual CamEd Women's Basketball Cup

CamEd believes that participation in student sports is a way to develop student team working skills, competitiveness, health, leadership and ability to perform under pressure. In Cambodia, CamEd has pioneered women's sports and has an approach that men's and women's sports are equally represented. CamEd supports not only its own teams, but also hosts annual tournaments for futsal, basketball, and athletics. In 2018 and 2017, the CamEd women's basketball team were the gold medalists in the Cambodian national university championships. In 2018 and 2017, the CamEd men's basketball team were third in the national university championships.

== People ==
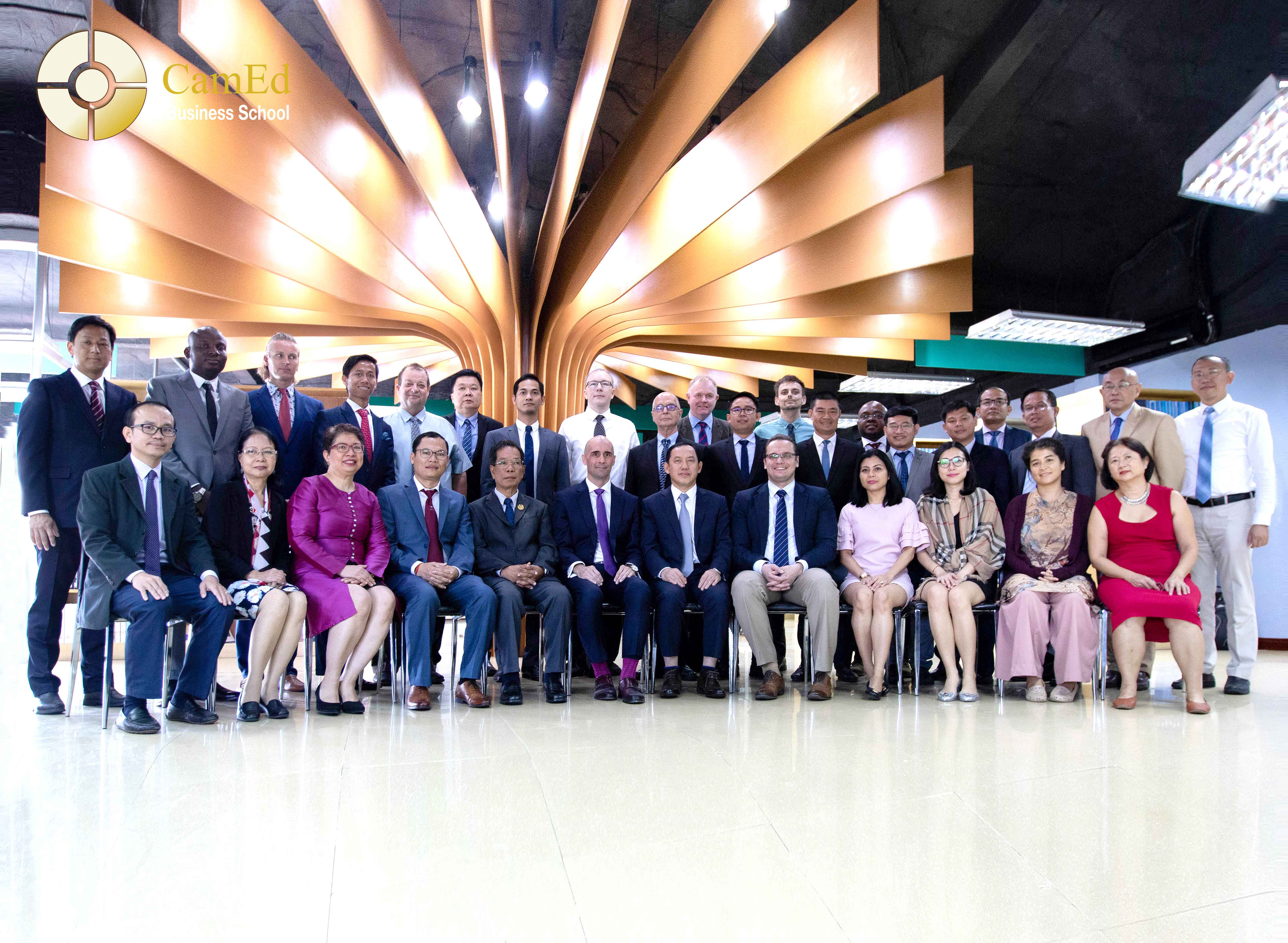
CamEd Professors and Lecturers in the CamEd Business Library

CamEd employs a diverse group of academics, most of whom are experts in the fields of accounting, tax, audit, finance, business strategy and economics. Some of CamEd's academic staff are experts in supporting fields or liberal arts subjects taught in the foundation year such as philosophy, computer science, political science, English as a second language, and psychology. The Bachelor of Accounting and Finance (Honours) program is taught by 58 professors and lecturers, 41% of whom held a PhD. They are supported by 274 tutors and teaching assistants. The academic staff are from a variety of countries including the US, Australia, the United Kingdom, Cambodia, Singapore, Malaysia, Nigeria, the Philippines, France, Hong Kong, and the Netherlands.

CamEd is governed by a board of six trustees. The chairman of the board of trustees is Sam Ghanty, a former professor of finance at the University of Wisconsin Greenbay and a member of the Securities and Exchange Commission of Cambodian. The other five trustees include Hap Phalthy, Dean of the Graduate School of Law at the Royal University of Law and Economics, Maria Isabelita Cabrera Manzon, CPA, ME, President Casey Barnett, Nean Bony, ACCA, and Darith Phat, PhD.

The board of trustees is supported by a number of committees which include both trustees as well as other experts. The committees include a nominations committee, an audit committee, a research committee, and a curriculum committee.

Management is led by the President Casey Barnett, a US citizen who holds an MBA from Columbia Business School and who is an advisor to the National Accounting Council of the Ministry of Economy and Finance. The President leads an executive committee that consists of Ms. Sam Sokuntheary, Senior Vice President, Keat Marath, Chief Financial Officer, Oeung Phengly, IT and Registrar Manager, and Yem Bunthorn, Learning and Support Center Assistant Manager.
