= Tra Vinh University =

- Motto: Bringing quality education to the community
- Type: Public
- Established: 2006
- Chairman: Professor Doctor Pham Tiet Khanh
- Rector: Associate Professor Doctor Nguyen Minh Hoa
- Total staff: 1.200
- Students: 20.506
- Undergraduates: 9.249 (full-time)
- Postgraduates: 1.437
- Doctoral students: 83
- Location: No. 126, Nguyen Thien Thanh St., Ward 5, Tra Vinh Province, Tra Vinh, Vietnam; 9.922°N 106.347°E
- Website: en.tvu.edu.vn

Tra Vinh University is a public university located in the city of Trà Vinh, Vietnam. The university was established in 2001 as Tra Vinh Community College (TVCC) in an international partnership between the Vietnamese and Canadian governments. The institution became Tra Vinh University (TVU) in 2006. Today, the university has over 20,000 students enrolled each year and focuses on providing learners with the 21st century skills needed to fulfill the region's specific workforce needs.

== History ==
- 2001: Tra Vinh Community College (TVCC) was formed under the Vietnam and Canada Community College Project. The college was developed to reduce poverty in the rural Mekong Delta region of Vietnam and increase skilled labourers in the workforce. To achieve this goal, the Vietnamese government requested the assistance of Global Affairs Canada. To develop the educational model of TVCC, Global Affairs Canada partnered with Colleges and Institutes Canada (formerly the ACCC), and 4 Canadian community colleges: the Saskatchewan Institute of Science and Applied Technology (SIAT), the Fisheries and Marine Institute of Memorial University of Newfoundland, the Quebec Institute of Agri-food Technology (ITAQ), and Vancouver Island University (formerly Malaspina University and College).
- 2006: Following significant development in the region, TVCC was beginning to see a large increase in annual enrollment. On June 19, 2006, Tra Vinh Community College upgraded to a university status and was renamed as Tra Vinh University, a public university serving the needs of the community and surround regions.

The university has to report and be directly responsible for its operation to the managing unit – Tra Vinh People Committee and the Ministry of Training and Education (MOET).

All programs and courses, including associate programs are designed and carried out in accordance with the developmental needs of communities under the permission of MOET.

Within ten years of its formation and development, the university gradually confirmed its scale and training quality in the Mekong Delta. The number of students increased from two hundred in the first course in July 2002 to twenty thousand in different majors. The number of graduated students often increases 70%, especially the number of students who achieve employment after one graduation year is 90%.

=== Currently ===
Currently, Tra Vinh University has 13 Schools of: Economics and Law (SEL); Southern Khmer Language, Culture, Art and Humanity (SLASKA); Medicine and Pharmacy | TVU Hospital; Agriculture and Aquaculture; Engineering and Technology (SET); Applied Chemistry; Physical Education; Political Theory; and Pre-University.

=== Programs ===
Tra Vinh University offers three Doctoral programs including Culture Studies (Southern Khmer Culture), Business Administration and Literature Teaching Methodology, and fifteen Master programs (updated in July, 2017) consisting of Culture Studies, Business Administration, Economic Law, Rural Development, Chemical Technology, Economics Management, Literature Teaching Methodology, English Teaching Methodology, Veterinary, Finance-Banking, Electricity Technology, Civil and Procedural Law, Constitutional and Administrative Law, Information Technology and Accounting. Tra Vinh University has launched 10 doctoral programs, 26 postgraduate programs, 52 Undergraduate programs and 09 first-level specialist programs, second-level specialist programs with full-time training, associate training, part-time training and distance training. Besides, the university has designed and conducted in-service training programs responding to companies’ and localities’ learning demands.

== Organization ==
Tra Vinh University has three Campuses at Tra Vinh City. Campus one, at 126 Nguyen Thien Thanh street, Ward 5, Tra Vinh City, Tra Vinh Province, where the administration center of the university is located.
