= INTI International University =

Private university in Malaysia

- 英迪国际大学 (Chinese)
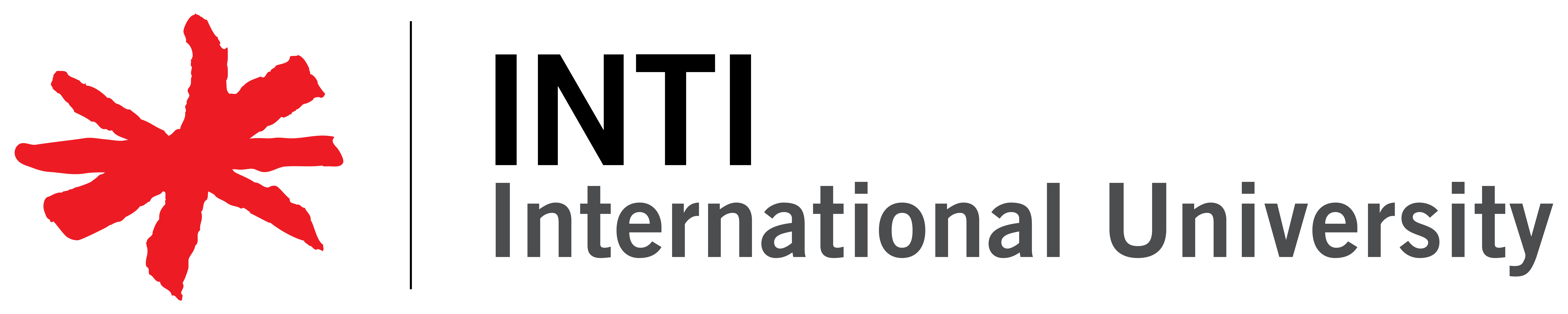
- Former names: INTI University College
- Type: Private
- Established: 1986
- Vice-Chancellor: Prof. Dr. Joseph Lee Yu Kuang
- Location: Malaysia; 2°48′49″N 101°45′30″E (Main Campus)
- Campus: See "Campuses"
- Colours: Vermilion
- Website: newinti.edu.my

Chinese name
- Simplified Chinese: 英迪国际大学
- Traditional Chinese: 英迪國際大學
Transcriptions
Standard Mandarin
- Hanyu Pinyin: Yīngdí Guójì Dàxué

INTI International University is a private university located in Malaysia. The main campus was initially known as INTI University College until 31 May 2010 when the Higher Education Ministry announced its upgrade to university status.

It is owned by INTI Education Group, which formalised its partnership with Laureate International Universities in 2008 and ended the partnership in 2020. In 2020, Hope Education Group (Hong Kong) completed the acquisition of INTI Education Group, establishing INTI Education Group as its inaugural offshore campus.

== History ==
The college commenced operations in 1986 in Brickfields, Kuala Lumpur with an initial enrollment of just 37 students. Within a span of 18 months, the student population surged to 400, prompting the college to relocate to Jalan Sungai Besi in Kuala Lumpur in 1989 due to the growing number of students.

Two years later, the college, which had grown to accommodate over 900 full-time students, established a permanent campus known as INTI College Subang Jaya (ICSJ). Additionally, branch campuses were opened in Kuching, Sarawak, and Kota Kinabalu, Sabah, in 1991 and 1996, respectively.

INTI College Malaysia's (ICM) main campus was founded on 82 acres (approximately 330,000 square meters) of land in Putra Nilai in 1998. In March 2000, INTI acquired International College Penang, situated in the Bukit Jambul education township. Furthermore, in 2004, INTI expanded its presence with the establishment of three new

University rankings

Global – Overall
- QS World: =509 (2026)

Regional – Overall
- QS Asia: 170 (2025)

associate campuses: Genting INTI International College, Metropolitan College, and PJ College of Art & Design.

On 4 September 2006, INTI College Malaysia received approval from the Ministry of Higher Education for an upgrade to university college status and became INTI University College (INTI UC).

In 2008, INTI merged with Laureate International Universities to become a member of the Laureate International Education Group.

On May 31, 2010, the Ministry of Higher Education granted INTI University College an upgrade in status, officially enabling it to grant its own degrees. As a result, INTI University College was rebranded as INTI International University (IU).

In 2020, the acquisition of INTI Education Group by Hope Education Group (Hong Kong) marked a significant milestone, establishing INTI as the pioneering offshore campus under their ownership.

== Campuses ==
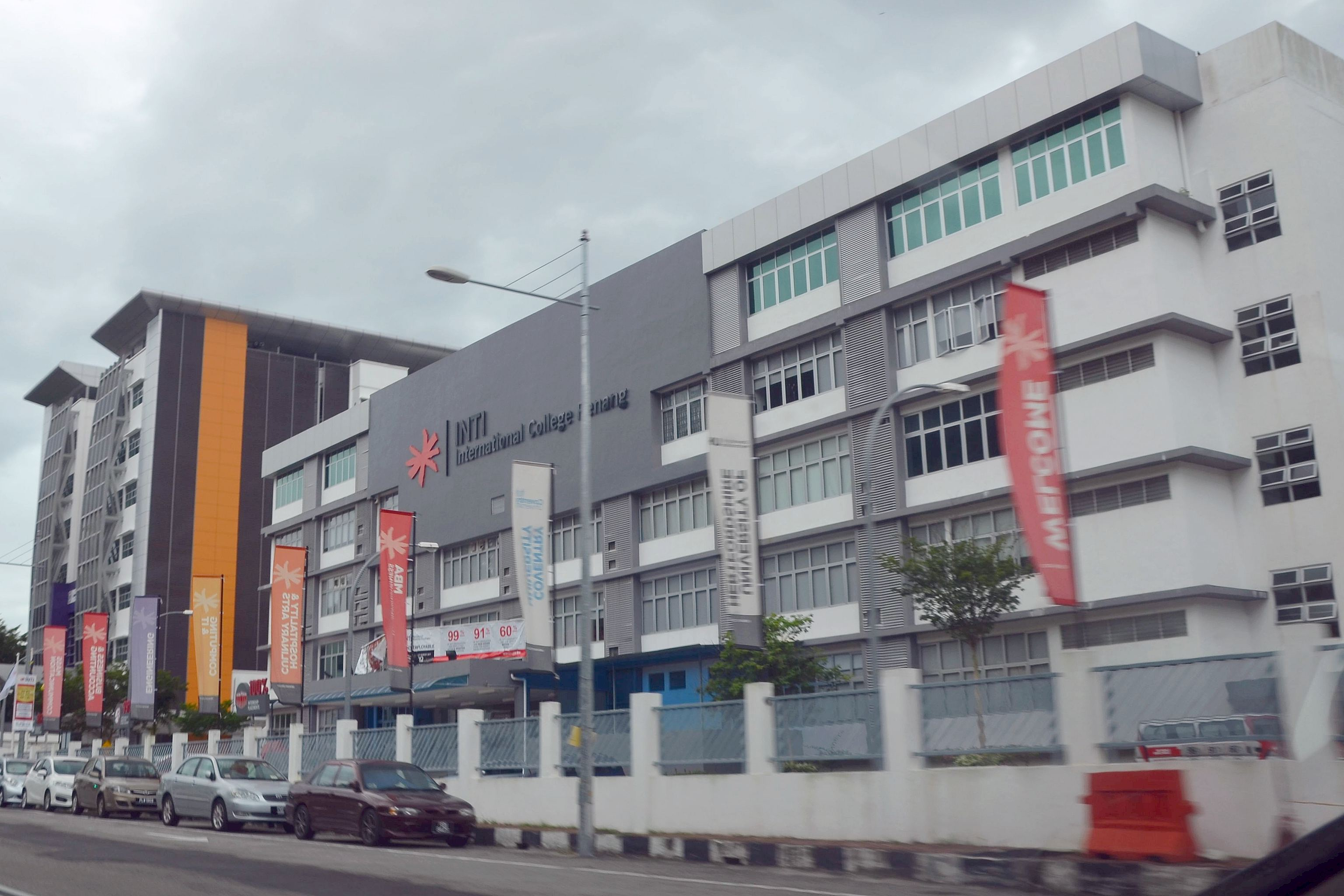
INTI International College Penang

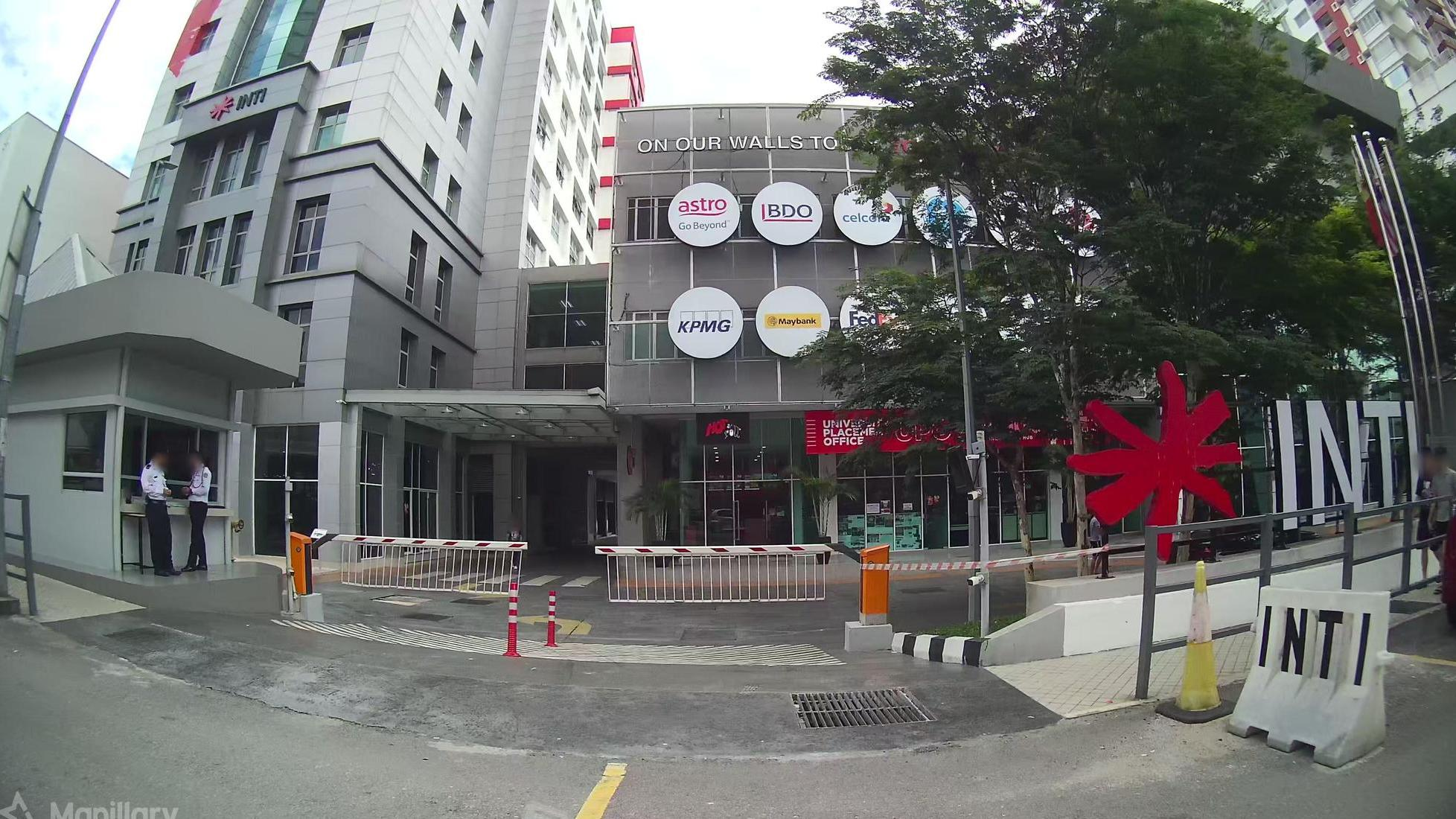
INTI International College Subang

INTI International University & Colleges currently have four campuses across Malaysia.

- INTI International University Nilai
- INTI International College Subang
- INTI International College Penang
- INTI College Sabah

== Additional photographs ==
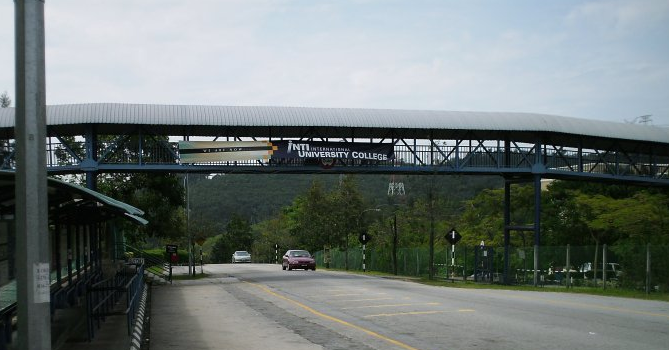
The footbridge of INTI International University

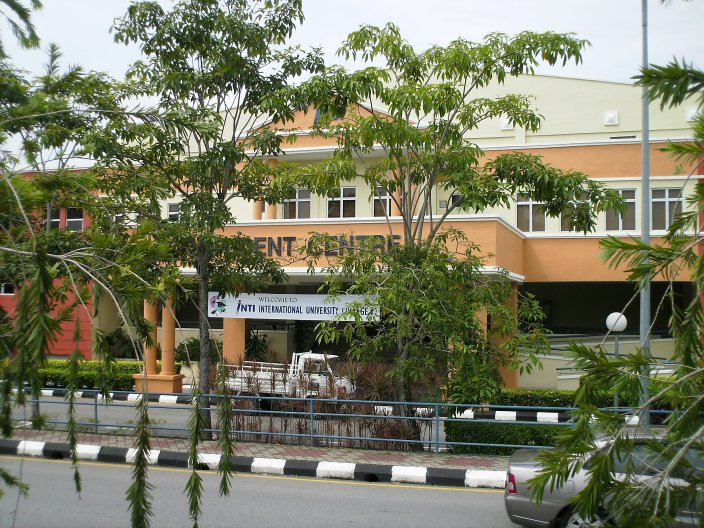
The student centre at INTI International University

== See also ==
- Education in Malaysia
