= Nilai University =

Private university in Malaysia

Coordinates: 2.815262°N 101.7668013°E

- Universiti Nilai
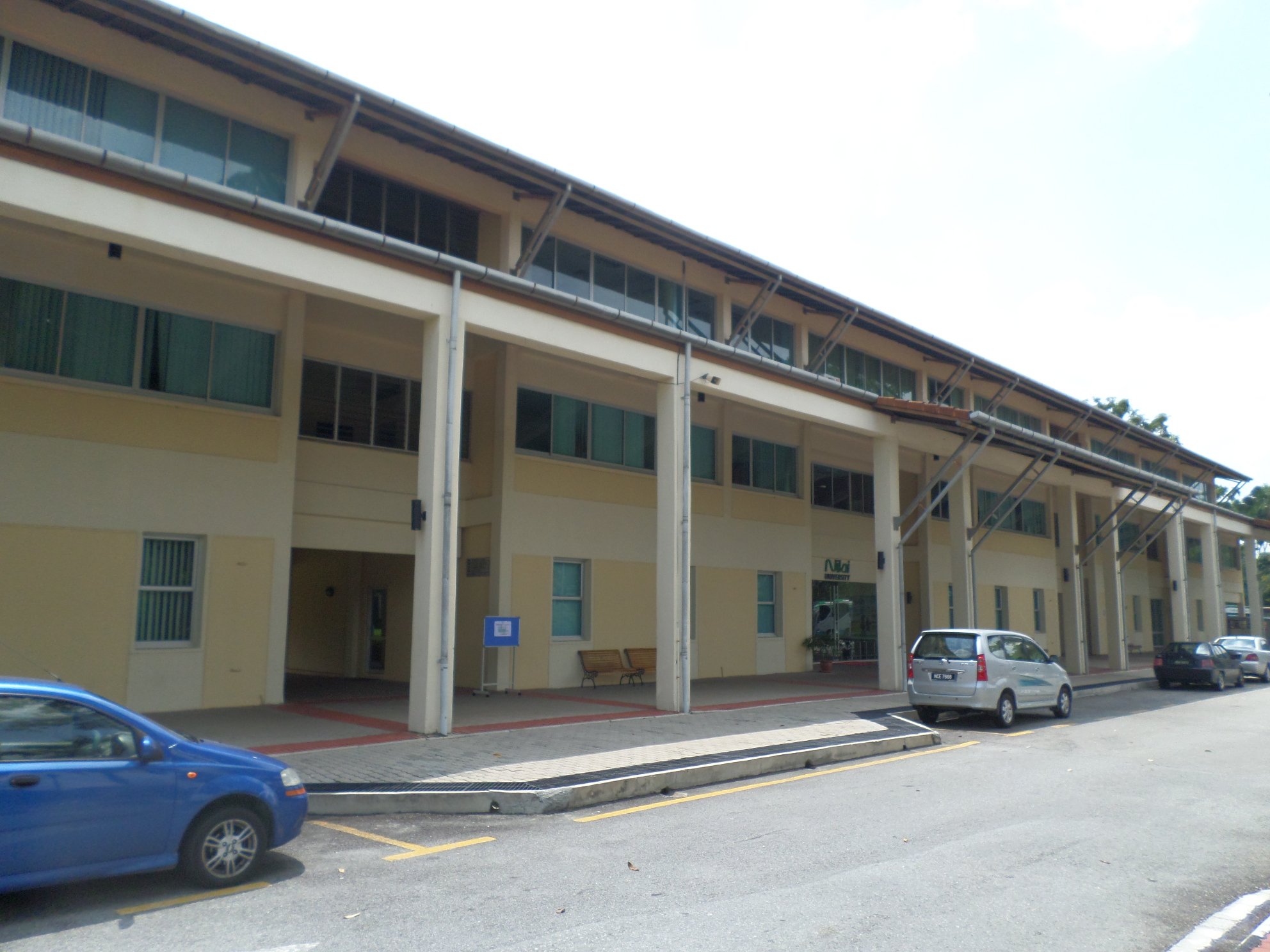
- The university's campus in Nilai
- Type: University
- Established: 1997
- Chancellor: Professor Emeritus Tengku Dato' Shamsul Bahrin
- Vice-Chancellor: Professor Dato' Dr Azhar Ismail
- Location: Nilai, Negeri Sembilan, Malaysia
- Campus: 105 acres
- Website: www.nilai.edu.my

Nilai University is a private university in Nilai, Seremban District, Negeri Sembilan, Malaysia.

== See also ==
- Education in Malaysia
