= Myanmar Institute of Information Technology =

Higher education institute in Mandalay, Myanmar

Coordinates: 21°56′16.4″N 96°05′32.4″E

- မြန်မာသတင်းအချက်အလက်နည်းပညာတက္ကသိုလ်
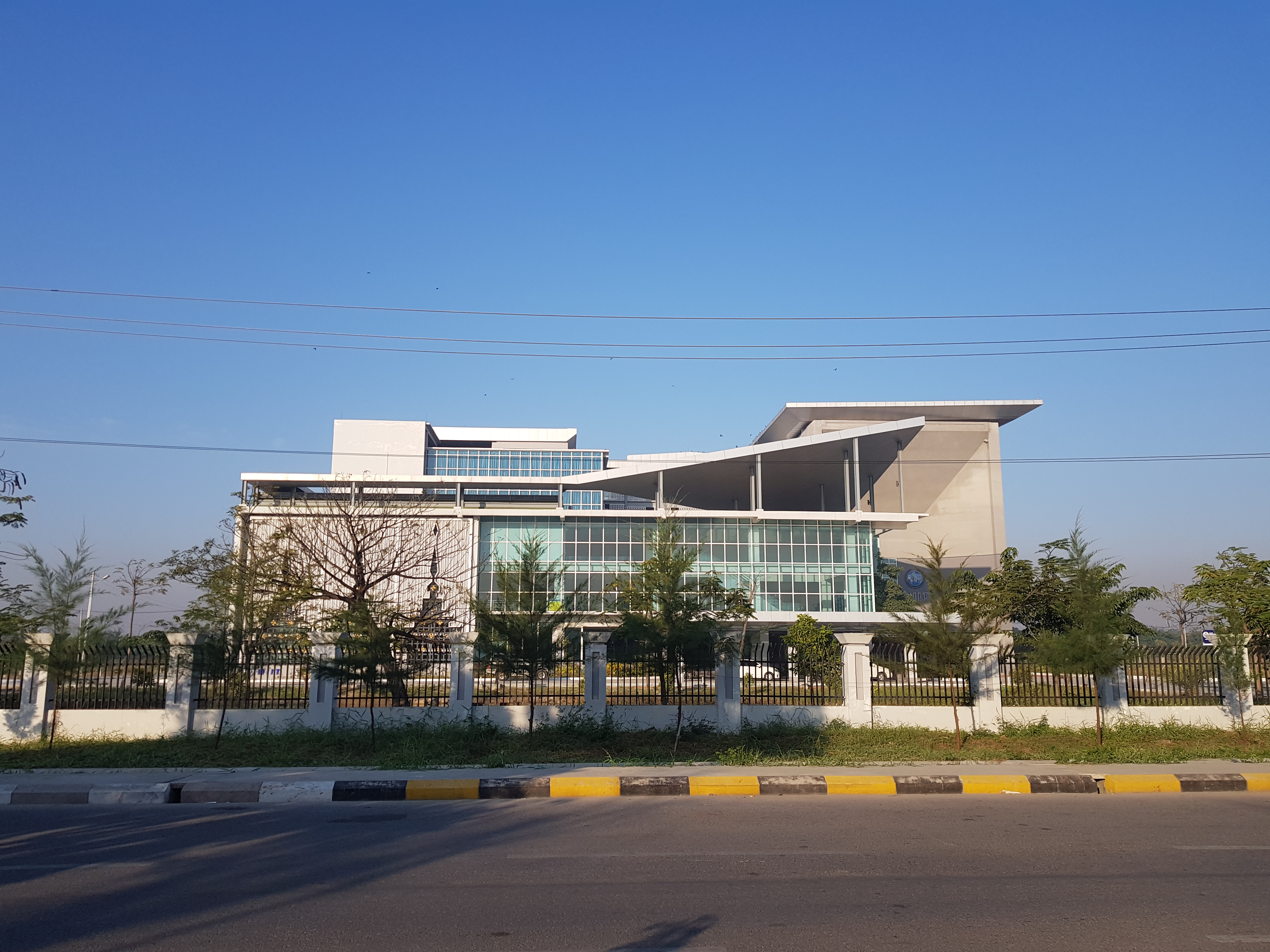
- Motto: Transforming Education. Enriching Lives.
- Type: Public
- Established: 2015; 11 years ago
- Rector: Dr. Win Aye
- Director: Dr. K. R. V. Subramnian
- Students: 572
- Undergraduates: 572
- Location: 73rd Street, Ngu Shwe Wah Street, Mandalay, Mandalay Region, 05053, Myanmar
- Campus: Urban
- Language: English, Myanmar
- Website: miit.edu.mm

Myanmar Institute of Information Technology (Burmese: မြန်မာသတင်းအချက်အလက်နည်းပညာတက္ကသိုလ်; abbreviated MIIT) is a technological university located in Chanmyathazi Township, Mandalay, Myanmar. It was set up as a National Centre of Excellence in 2015 as a result of a memorandum of understanding between the Government of Myanmar and the Government of India. It currently offers Bachelor of Engineering degrees in computer science and engineering and electronics and communications engineering.

== Campus ==
MIIT is located on a 7-acre campus in southwestern Mandalay. The classrooms and laboratories operate from a six-story structure. The main academic building is equipped with multiple teaching and learning spaces that include classrooms, laboratories, an auditorium, and recreational areas.

MIIT provides residential facilities for its entire teaching staff. Separate hostel facilities for male and female students are also provided.

== Academics ==
MIIT currently offers two undergraduate degree programmes in computer science and engineering and electronics and communications (engineering).

== Admissions ==
Students are admitted to the Bachelor of Engineering (Honours) programmes in computer science and engineering and electronics and communications Engineering once each year, for the academic year starting in December.

=== Input Qualifications ===
Applicants must have passed the Matriculation Exam of Myanmar in the year of admission, with mathematics, physics, chemistry, and English as the subjects.
