= Salak Tinggi =

Town in Selangor, Malaysia

Coordinates: 2°48′0″N 101°45′0″E

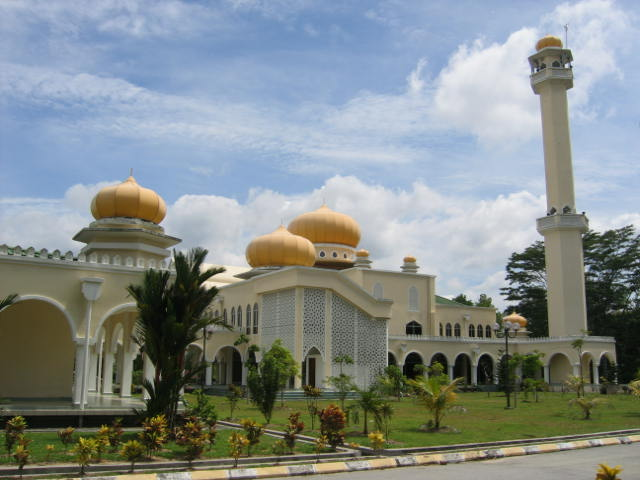
Salak Tinggi

Salak Tinggi in Sepang District

Salak Tinggi is a town in Sepang District, Selangor, Malaysia. Located about 9 km north of the Kuala Lumpur International Airport, it is the capital and seat of the Sepang district's administration.

Due to its proximity to the airport, Salak Tinggi is occasionally known as Airport City.

Salak Tinggi is popular for its distance from the airport and Sepang International Circuit.

== Features ==
Salak Tinggi is the home to KFC Hatchery, a latex glove factory owned by Wembley Rubber Products (WRP), the workshop complex of the Engineering Division of the Fire and Rescue Department, the Veterinary Public Health Laboratory of the Department of Veterinary Services Malaysia as well as the National Metrology Institute of Malaysia-Standards and Research Institute of Malaysia (NMIM-SIRIM) (). Government agencies such as Pos Malaysia, National Registration Department, and SYABAS are located at the town heart of Bandar Baru Salak Tinggi and Kosmopleks.

As Bandar Baru Salak Tinggi is the nearest housing estate to Kuala Lumpur International Airport (KLIA), its residents are mainly airport ground staff and airline crew. Kota Warisan is a relatively new township located in the suburb of Bandar Baru Salak Tinggi.

Salak Tinggi is inundated annually by motorsports fans because it nears the Sepang International Circuit (SIC). Most travellers stay at the Pan Pacific Hotel, Concorde Inn, Cyberview Lodge, Empress Hotel or De Palma Inn although the recently opened Transit Service Centre budget hotel at the Airport City Business Centre is becoming increasingly popular due its proximity to the KLIA and klia2 airports (15 minutes drive away) and is beside the Salak Tinggi ERL station where there is a twice-hourly KLIA Transit service to KLIA/klia2 and KL Sentral (Central transportation hub in Kuala Lumpur city).

Since Bandar Baru Bangi is technically located at Sepang District, IOI City mall is technically in Sepang which makes it popular for the activities.

== Education ==
Xiamen University Malaysia Campus is located at this city.

=== Schools ===
- Sekolah Menengah Kebangsaan Bandar Baru Salak Tinggi (SMKBBST)
- Sekolah Agama Menengah Bandar Baru Salak Tinggi (SAMBBST)
- Sekolah Menengah Kebangsaan Seri Sepang (SERISS)
- Sekolah Kebangsaan Taman Seroja (SKTS)
- Sekolah Kebangsaan KLIA (SK KLIA)
- Sekolah Kebangsaan Bandar Baru Salak Tinggi (SKBBST)
- Sekolah Kebangsaan Salak (SK SALAK)

== Transportation ==
Salak Tinggi is primarily served by the Salak Tinggi ERL station on the KLIA Transit of the Express Rail Link network, providing railway connection to KLIA as well as Kuala Lumpur (via KL Sentral).

== Suburbs ==
- Kota Warisan
- Sunsuria City
- Serenia City
