= Kota Warisan =

Township in Malaysia

Kota Warian
- Township
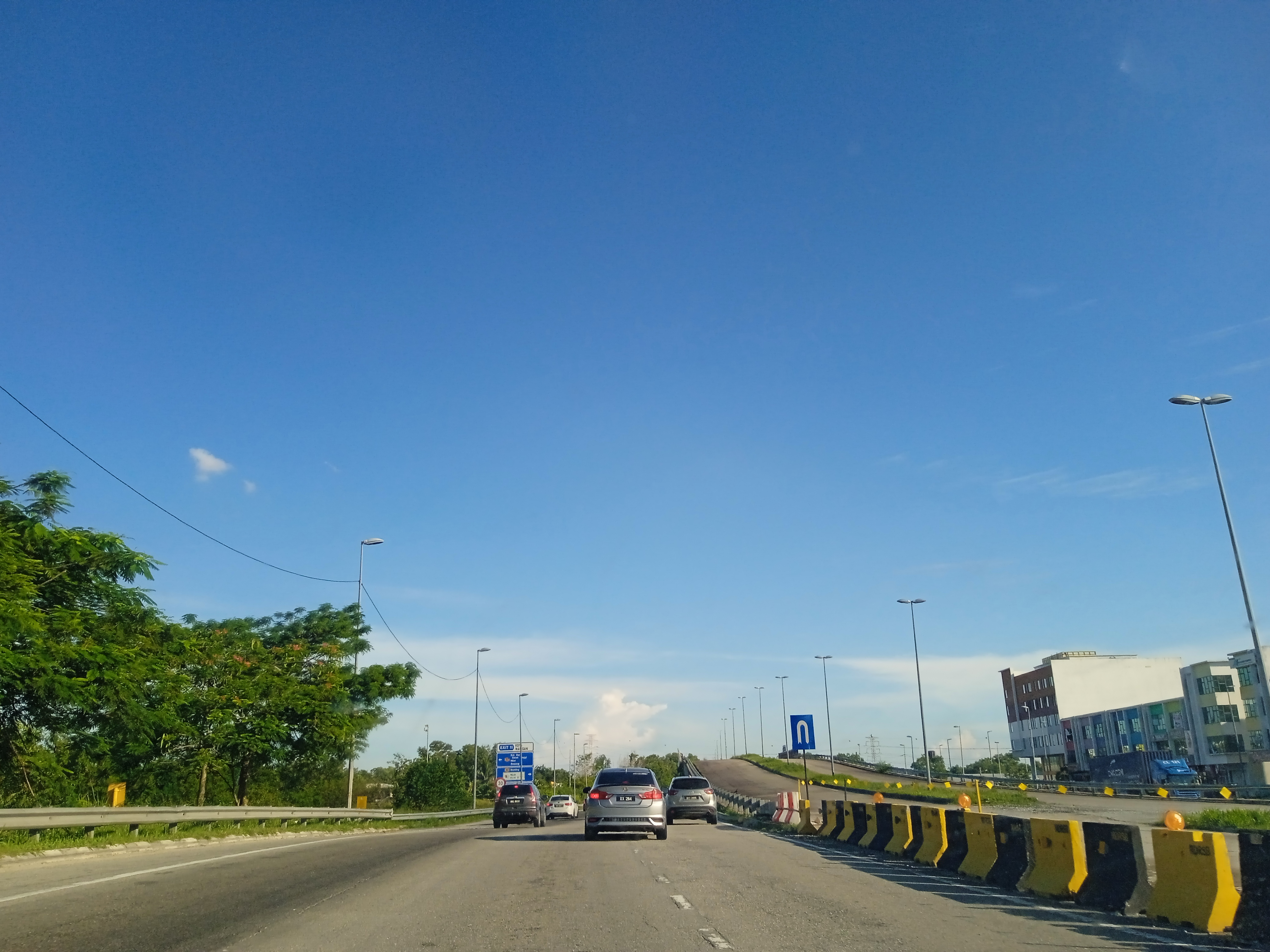
- Kota Warisan
- Interactive map of Kota Warian
- Time zone: UTC+8 (MST)
- Website: www.mpsp.gov.my

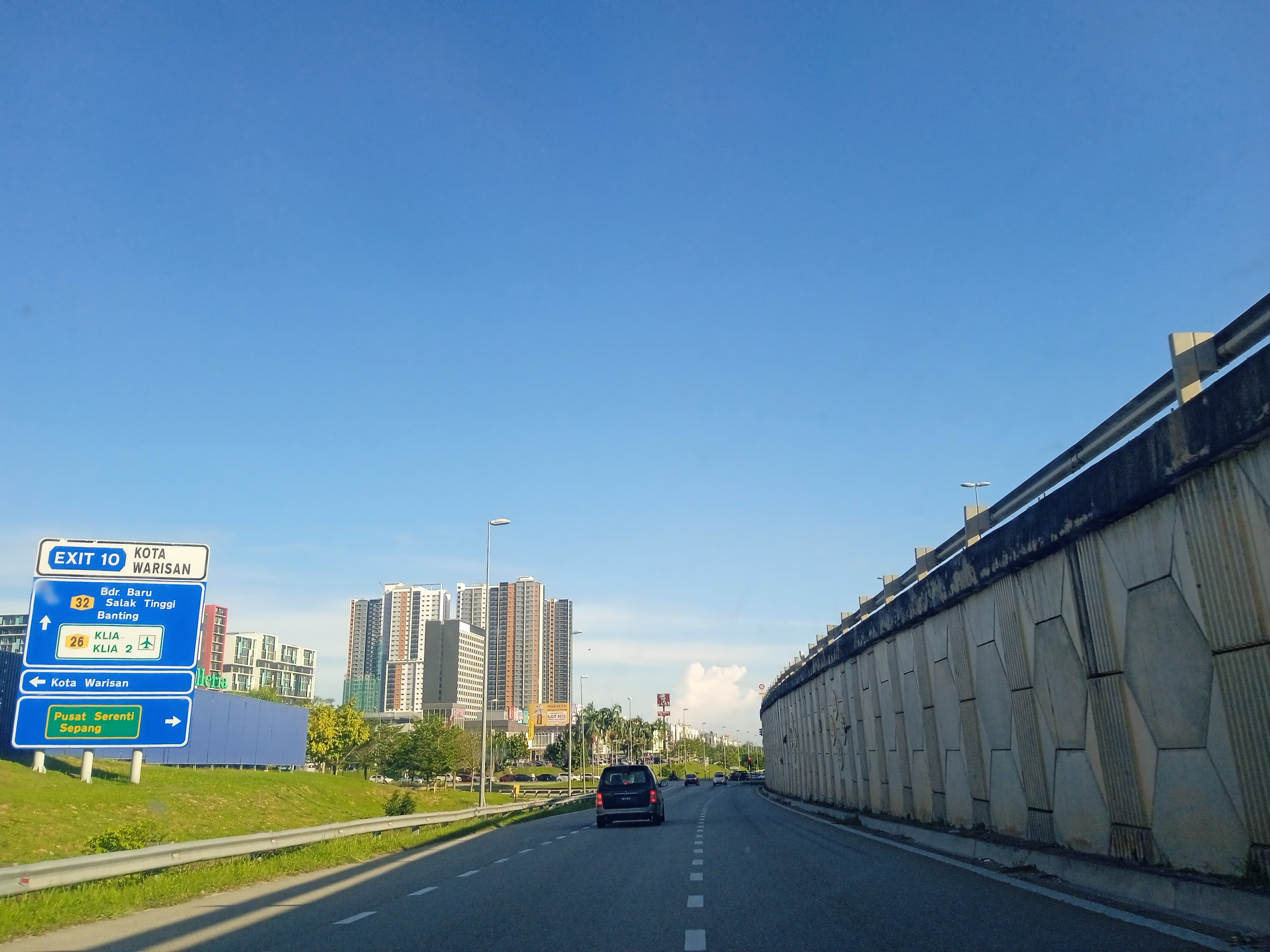
Kota Warisan Interchange

Kota Warisan is a township in Dengkil, Sepang District, Selangor, Malaysia. The developer of the 600-acre township is Gema Padu. Since 1997, the township's 350 acres have been developed, and more than 4,000 residential and commercial units have been completed as of 2011. The airport, stores at Kuala Lumpur International Airport (KLIA) and the low-cost carrier terminal and airline workers, as well as the working population in Cyberjaya and officials from Putrajaya, are the targeted group of residents in the township.

Its neighbouring townships are Serenia City, Sunsuria City, KIP Sentral, Warisan Puteri and Saujana KLIA.

== Access ==
=== Car ===
E6 North–South Expressway Central Link runs along the southern boundary of the township and can be accessed via Exit 609, Bandar Serenia Exit, and also through Federal Route 29.

=== Public transportation ===
The closest rail station is ERL Salak Tinggi, about 2.3 km (1.4 mi) west.
