= Serenia City =

Township in Selangor, Malaysia

Serenia City Bandar Serenia
- Township
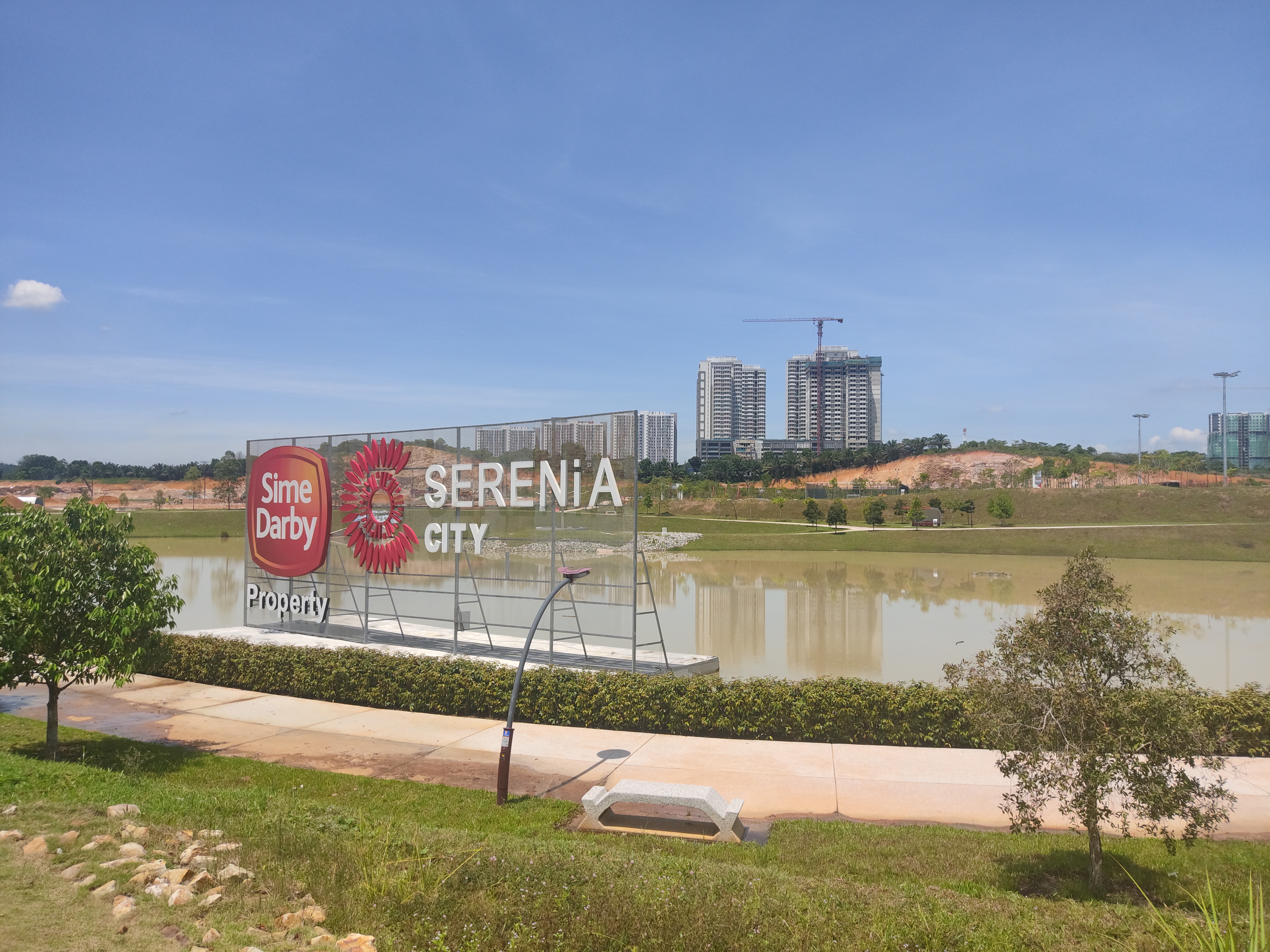
- Serenia City

- Serenia City in Selangor, Malay Peninsular and Malaysia Serenia City (Peninsular Malaysia) Serenia City (Malaysia)
- Coordinates: 2°50′35.12″N 101°41′47.65″E
- Country: Malaysia
- State: Selangor
- District: Sepang
- Time zone: UTC+8 (MYT)
- Postal code: 43900

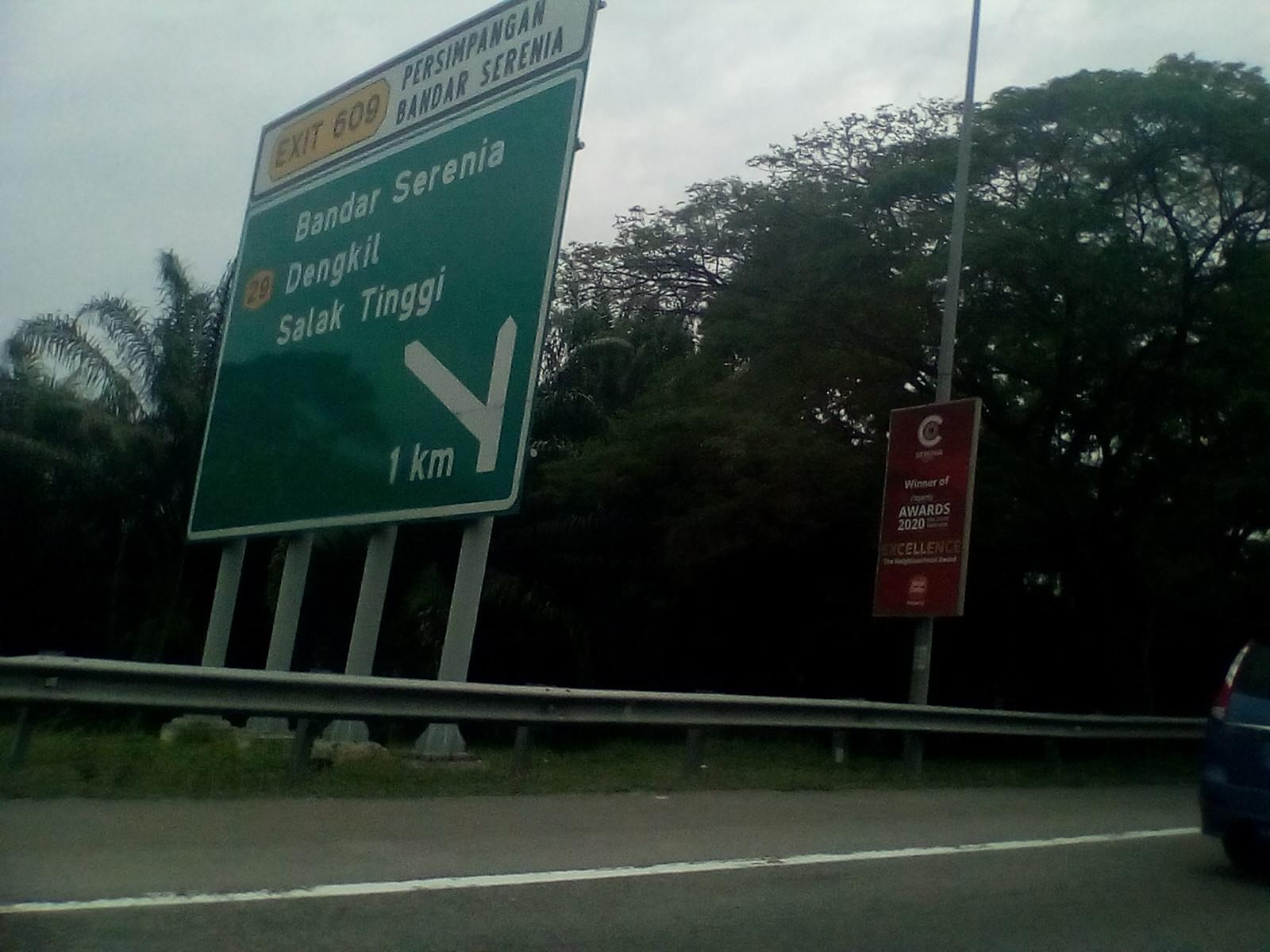
PLUS highway Serenia interchange

Serenia City (etymology from "Serene" which is the translation of Tenang in English) is a township in Dengkil township in Sepang District, Selangor, Malaysia. Serenia is located near Salak Tinggi. The area was formerly known as Ampar Tenang Estate and started out as the tea, rubber and current palm oil plantation. In 2016, the estate started to turn into a freehold township that is developed by Sime Darby Properties. The township has an area of 2370 acres and is divided into 5 precincts which are Cipta, Citra, Aman, Bayu and Puncak, targeted to cater to 60,000 residents in 2035.

== Access ==
=== Car ===
E6 North–South Expressway Central Link runs along the southern boundary of the township and can be accessed via exit 609 Bandar Serenia exit.

=== Public transportation ===
The closest rail station is ERL Salak Tinggi, about 5.3 km east.
