= 16 Sierra =

Township in Selangor, Malaysia

- Township
- Bandar 16 Sierra

Other transcription(s)
  - Jawi script: سييرا 16
  - Chinese: 16岭 (Simplified); 16嶺 (Traditional)
  - Tamil: 16 சியாரா
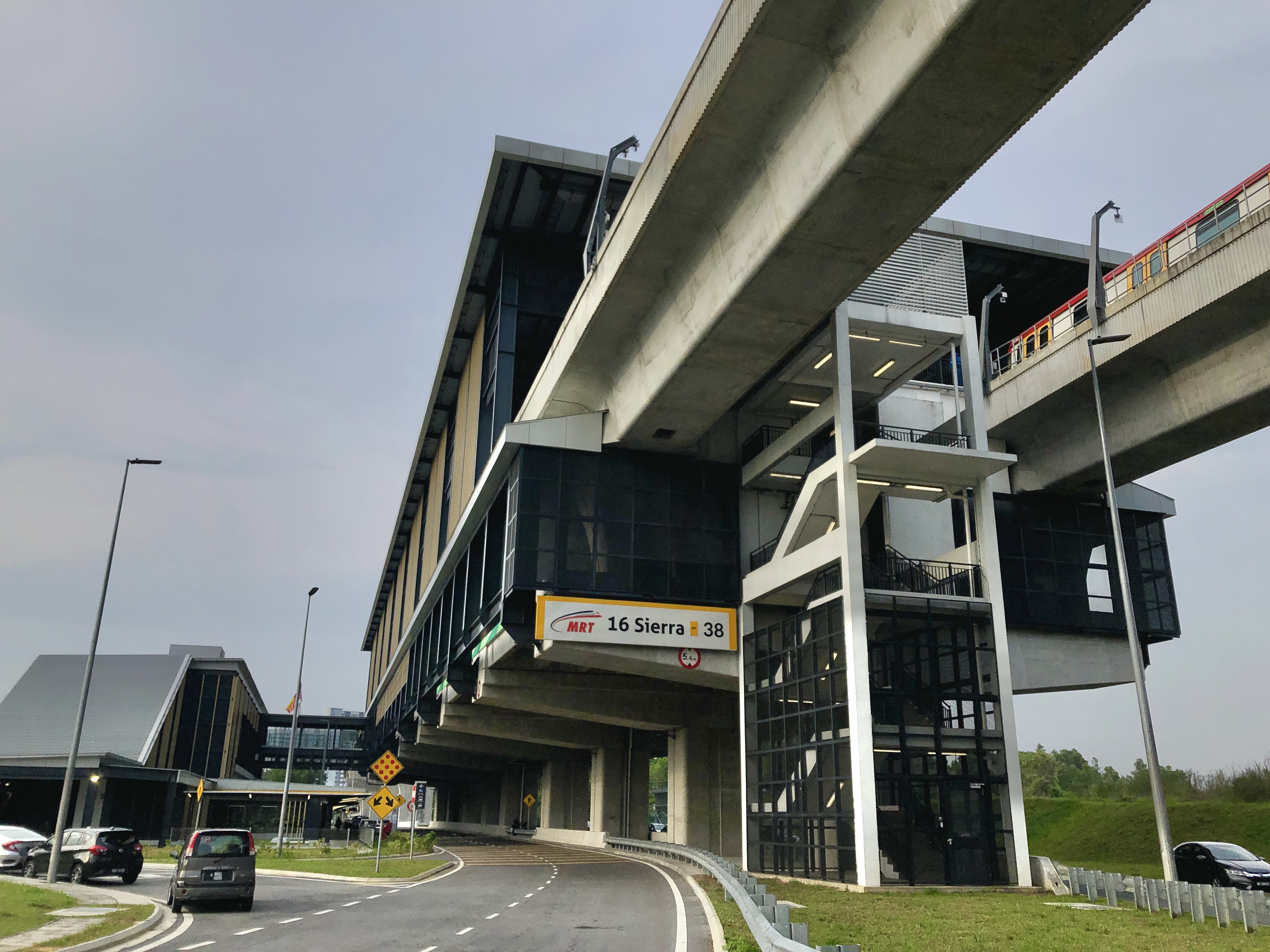
- 16 Sierra MRT Station

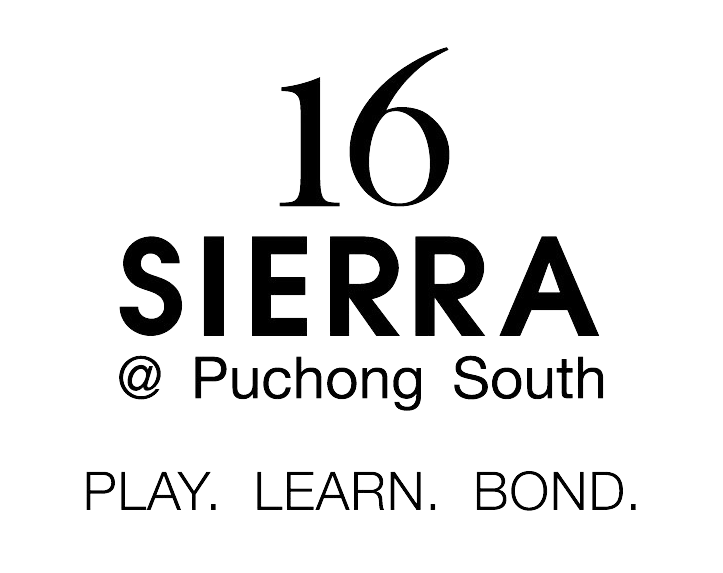
- Logo
- Motto: Play, Learn & Bond
- Interactive map of 16 Sierra
- Coordinates: 2°58.171′N 101°39.253′E
- Country: Malaysia
- State: Selangor
- District: Sepang
- Mukim: Dengkil
- Launched: 2010
- Founder: IOI Properties

Government
  - Local government: Sepang Municipal Council

Area
  - Total: 217 ha (535 acres)
- Elevation: 70 m (230 ft)

Population
  - Estimate (2024): 12,000
- Time zone: UTC+8 (MST)
  - Summer (DST): Not observed
- Postcode: 47120
- Website: Official website

16 Sierra, also known as Bandar 16 Sierra, is a 535 acres (217 ha) township located in the south of Puchong, Sepang district, Selangor, Malaysia. The township was launched in 2010 by IOI Properties. In 2024, 16 Sierra had an estimated population of 12,000 people.

The postcode used in 16 Sierra is 47120 Puchong.

== Name ==
The number '16' refers to the 16 zones in the township which consist of residential (and commercial) areas. While 'Sierra' is a Spanish word meaning "high elevated land".

== Administration ==
16 Sierra is located within Mukim Dengkil, which is one of the three mukims in the Sepang district. Apart from that, 16 Sierra is located under the administration of the Sepang Municipal Council (MPSepang), where it is in the Sierra Putri Zone of MPSepang.

== Geography ==
16 Sierra is located at an altitude of 70 m (230 ft) above sea level.

There are several settlements adjacent to 16 Sierra. These include Taman D'Alpinia to the north; Bandar Putra Permai to the northeast; Precinct 11 (Putrajaya) to the east; Garden Residence (Cyberjaya) to the southeast; Cyberjaya to the south; Taman Perindustrian Meranti Utama to the southwest; Kampung Pulau Meranti to the west; and Taman KiPark to the northwest.

== Amenities ==
=== Recreation ===
16 Sierra has a central park covering an area of 7.2 acres (2.9 ha).

In addition, 16 Sierra has a recreation centre located near the central park, namely Amigo Clubhouse.

=== Education ===
Rafflesia International & Private Schools is a private school located in the township.

== Transport ==
=== Expressways ===
16 Sierra is accessible through these 3 main expressways.

- South Klang Valley Expressway (SKVE)
- Maju Expressway (MEX)
- Damansara–Puchong Expressway (LDP)

=== Public transportation ===
PY38 16 Sierra MRT station is a train station that serve the township.
