= Sepang District =

- District of Selangor
- Daerah Sepang
- Seal

- Location of Sepang District in Selangor
- Interactive map of Sepang District
- Location of Sepang District in Malaysia
- Coordinates: 2°45′N 101°40′E
- Country: Malaysia
- State: Selangor
- Seat: Salak Tinggi
- Local area government(s): Sepang Municipal Council

Government
  - District officer: Khairi Azali bin Ibrahim
  - Sultan's Representative: Tengku Jamaluddin Tengku Mahmud Shah

Area
  - Total: 619.00 km^{2} (239.00 sq mi)

Population (2023)
  - Total: 338,600
  - Density: 547.0/km^{2} (1,417/sq mi)
- Time zone: UTC+8 (MST)
  - Summer (DST): UTC+8 (Not observed)
- Postcode: 43000 (Sungai Merab); 43800 (Dengkil, Jenderam); 43900 (Sepang Town, Bandar Baru Salak Tinggi); 43950 (Sungai Pelek, Bagan Lalang); 47120 (Bukit Puchong 2); 62502 (IOI City Mall); 63XXX (Cyberjaya); 64000 (Kuala Lumpur International Airport)
- Calling code: +6-03-8
- Vehicle registration plates: B

The Sepang District is an administrative district located in the southern southernmost part of the state of Selangor in Malaysia. The district covers a gazetted local plan planning area of 619.00 km^{2} (239.00 sq mi) (61,900.00 hectares) and had an estimated population of 338,600 in 2023.

The administrative capital of Sepang is the planned town of Salak Tinggi, which succeeded the historic border settlement of Sepang town. Sepang is widely recognized as Malaysia's global gateway, being home to the country's primary aviation hub, Kuala Lumpur International Airport (KLIA), as well as Cyberjaya, a designated high-technology core established under the MSC Malaysia initiative.

The district's northern section contains southernmost residential suburban extensions of Puchong and Kajang, including communities such as Bukit Puchong 2, 16 Sierra, Pulau Meranti, Bandar Nusaputra, Taman Putra Perdana, Taman Putra Prima, Kampung Sungai Merab, and Desa Pinggiran Putra.

== History ==
Historically administered under neighbouring jurisdictions, the Sepang District was formally constituted on 1 January 1975 from the repartitioning of sections of the Hulu Langat (Kajang) and Kuala Langat districts. The municipal authority, the Sepang Municipal Council (Majlis Perbandaran Sepang), was established when local administration gained full municipal status in 2005.

Under the statutory Sepang Municipal Council Local Plan 2035 (Replacement) prepared by PLANMalaysia, the district is targeted to transition toward full city council status (Majlis Bandaraya Sepang) by 2035, underpinned by the Integrated Development Region in South Selangor (IDRISS) initiative.

== Geography ==
Eroded coastal rock formations in Sepang District

Sepang occupies the southern tip of Selangor facing the Strait of Malacca. It borders Kuala Langat to the west, Petaling to the north, Hulu Langat to the northeast, and the state of Negeri Sembilan (specifically Seremban and Port Dickson) across the Sepang River to the east and south. In addition, Sepang completely encompasses the federal administrative centre of Putrajaya.

According to the 2035 Land Use Zoning data, the district's 61,900 hectares (153,000 acres) area is apportioned into housing (20.19%), transport corridors (19.29%), water bodies (11.10%), mixed-use development (9.79%), agriculture (9.50%), commercial (8.33%), industry (5.44%), forestry (4.36%), and public utilities and institutions.

== Administrative divisions ==
Map showing the three cadastral mukims of Sepang

At the cadastral level, Sepang District is divided into three traditional mukims (sub-districts):

- Dengkil
- Labu
- Sepang

=== Planning blocks ===
For strategic urban planning, zoning enforcement, and infrastructure allocation, the Sepang Municipal Council and PLANMalaysia organise the district into eight designated Planning Blocks (Blok Perancangan, BP):

Planning Block	Name	Area (ha)	Key Localities & Development Highlights
BP1	Pinggiran Cyberjaya	6,201.01	16 Sierra, Pulau Meranti, Taman Putra Prima, Selangor Cyber Valley, Bukit Damar, Cybersouth
BP2	Cyberjaya	2,841.99	Cyber 1 through Cyber 12, multimedia technology hubs, high-tech enterprises, higher education institutions
BP3	Sungai Merab	8,641.15	Universiti Putra Malaysia sector, Sungai Merab, Bukit Unggul, Jenderam Hulu
BP4	Ampar Tenang	2,841.99	Bandar Serenia, Ampar Tenang, Pekan Dengkil, Timah Langat
BP5	Salak Tinggi	2,400.87	Bandar Baru Salak Tinggi (District capital), Salak Perdana, Jenderam Hulu
BP6	KLIA	9,851.53	Kuala Lumpur International Airport operational zone, Airport Central, aerospace zone, DFTZ logistics corridors
BP7	Pinggiran KLIA	3,636.93	Bandar Avion, Labu Lanjut, Pekan Salak
BP8	Sungai Pelek	23,809.45	Pekan Sepang, Pekan Sungai Pelek, Bagan Lalang beach resort zone, Banghuris ecotourism area

== Demographics ==
Historical population
Year	Pop.	±%
1991	54,671	—
2000	108,640	+98.7%
2010	207,354	+90.9%
2020	324,935	+56.7%
2023	338,600	+4.2%
2035	595,801	+76.0%
Figures prior to 2001 include Putrajaya. Source:

According to official projections using backcasting urban planning models in the municipal local plan, the population of Sepang District is projected to reach 595,801 residents by 2035, requiring an estimated 211,938 housing units.

== Federal Parliament and State Assembly seats ==
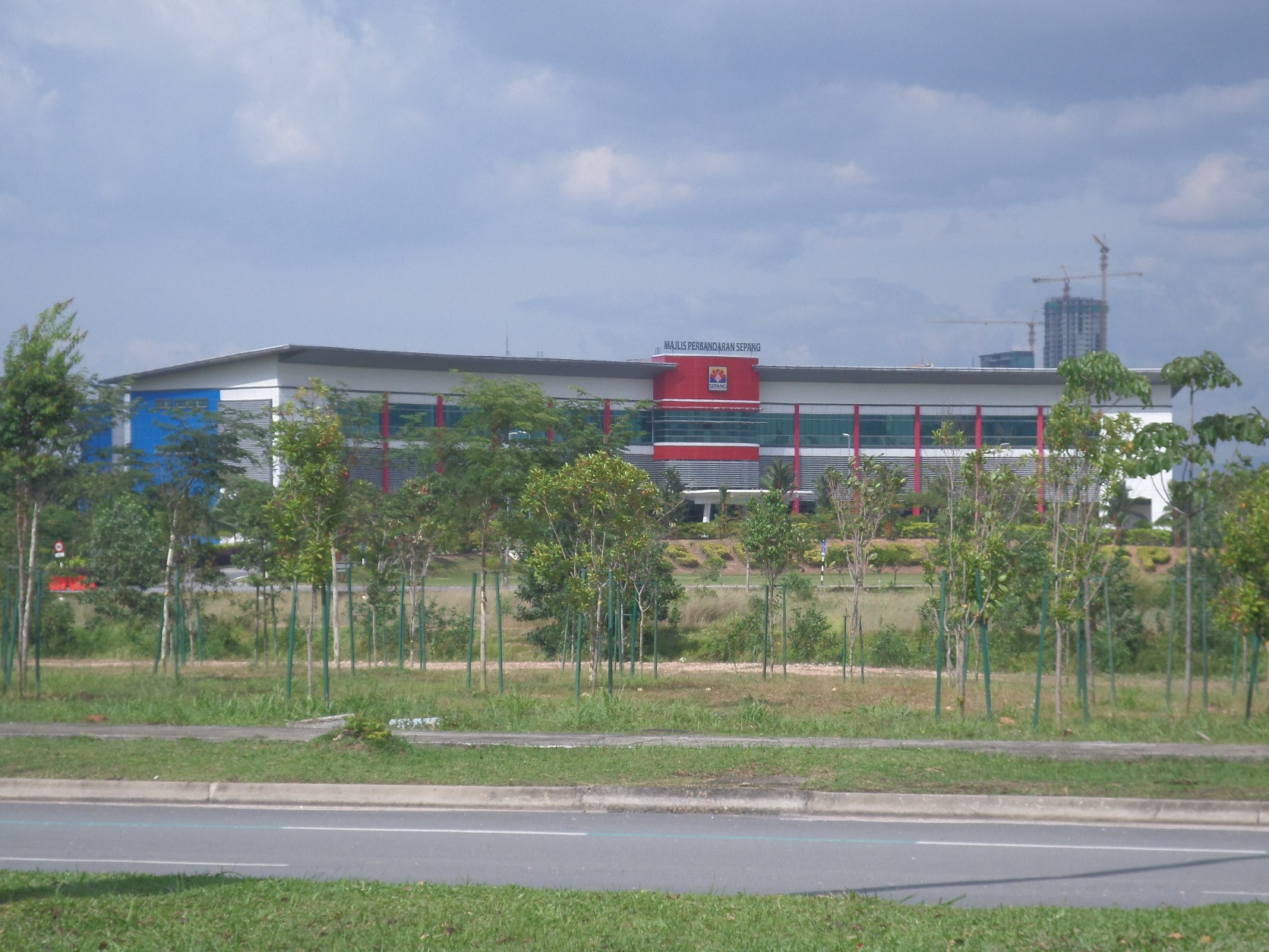
Sepang Municipal Council headquarters at Cyberjaya

Sepang electoral divisions

List of Sepang district representatives in the Federal Parliament (Dewan Rakyat):

Parliament	Constituency	Member of Parliament	Party
P113	Sepang	Aiman Athirah Sabu	Pakatan Harapan (AMANAH)

List of Sepang district representatives in the Selangor State Legislative Assembly:

Parliament	State	Constituency	Member of the Legislative Assembly	Party
P113	N54	Tanjong Sepat	Borhan Aman Shah	Pakatan Harapan (PKR)
P113	N55	Dengkil	Jamil Salleh	Perikatan Nasional (BERSATU)
P113	N56	Sungai Pelek	Lwi Kian Keong	Pakatan Harapan (DAP)

== Economy ==
Sepang serves as Malaysia's core aviation and logistics center. The corporate headquarters of Malaysia Airlines, AirAsia, AirAsia X, MASkargo, and Malaysia Airports Holdings Berhad are based on the grounds of Kuala Lumpur International Airport.

The ongoing development of KLIA Aeropolis is structured to advance aerospace maintenance, air cargo logistics, and aviation manufacturing by 2035. The Electronic World Trade Platform (eWTP) Digital Free Trade Zone (DFTZ) hub jointly developed with Alibaba Group serves as a regional e-commerce distribution centre. High-technology clusters and software companies are centered at Cyberjaya, while digital animation studio Animonsta Studios operates its creative facilities in Cyber 8.

== Tourist attractions ==
- Petronas Sepang International Circuit
- Bagan Lalang Beach and Avani Sepang Gold Coast
- Mitsui Outlet Park KLIA
- IOI City Mall (Southern concourse sector)
- Banghuris Homestay Ecotourism

== Transportation ==
=== Air ===
- Kuala Lumpur International Airport (KLIA Terminal 1 and Terminal 2)

=== Railways ===
ERL 7 KLIA Transit & 6 KLIA Ekspres

- KLIA Terminal 2 — KLIA Terminal 1 — Salak Tinggi (Transit Line only)

RapidKL 12 Putrajaya Line

- 16 Sierra — Cyberjaya Utara — Cyberjaya City Centre

=== Buses and highways ===
Public bus transit in Sepang is predominantly covered by the free Smart Selangor Bus network operated by Causeway Link and SKS-BUS, radiating from the central transport terminal in Bandar Baru Salak Tinggi to Dengkil, Cyberjaya, KLIA, and Sungai Pelek. Rapid KL operates feeder bus services connecting residential areas with the Putrajaya Line MRT stations and LRT stations.

Major expressways serving the district include the North–South Expressway Central Link (ELITE, E6), the Maju Expressway (MEX, E20), the South Klang Valley Expressway (SKVE, E26), and Damansara–Puchong Expressway (LDP, E11). Ongoing transport road projects under the 2035 Local Plan focus on completing missing road links along Federal Route 32 (Jalan Labohan Dagang–Nilai) and building new highway links connecting the IDRISS growth nodes.

== Education ==
Sepang features an extensive concentration of tertiary and higher education campuses:

- Xiamen University Malaysia (Bandar Sunsuria)
- Multimedia University (Cyberjaya Campus)
- University of Cyberjaya (UoC)
- Limkokwing University of Creative Technology
- Universiti Teknologi MARA (UiTM Dengkil Campus)
- City University Malaysia (Cyberjaya Campus)
- UNIKOP College

== See also ==
- Districts of Malaysia
- Sepang Municipal Council
