= Sunsuria City =

Township in Sepang, Selangor, Malaysia

Sunsuria City Bandar Sunsuria
- Township
- Interactive map of Sunsuria City
- Coordinates: 2.8287583°N 101.7089836°E
- Country: Malaysia
- State: Selangor
- District: Sepang
- Time zone: UTC+8 (MST)
- Postal code: 43900

Sunsuria City (Malay: Bandar Sunsuria) is a 525-acre integrated township in Salak Tinggi, Sepang District, Selangor, Malaysia. Developed by Sunsuria Berhad, the development is anchored by the Malaysian campus of Xiamen University and includes residential, commercial, and educational precincts planned around transit access at the adjacent Salak Tinggi ERL station.

== Education ==
The township houses Xiamen University Malaysia, which opened in 2016 as the first overseas campus of a top-tier Chinese university, situated along Jalan Sunsuria.

In September 2024, Concord College International School Malaysia opened in the township. It is the first international branch campus of Concord College in the United Kingdom, offering British curriculum education for day and boarding students aged 3 to 18.

SJK (C) Sunsuria, a Chinese-medium national-type primary school, is under construction on a 2.83-hectare plot in the township. Approved by the Ministry of Education in 2017, the school broke ground in May 2024. The 24-classroom facility is planned to accommodate up to 960 students upon its projected completion in 2027 and student enrolment expected to begin in 2028.

== Transport ==
=== Road ===
Sunsuria City is connected to the North–South Expressway Central Link (ELITE) via the Bandar Serenia interchange. Regional connections to Putrajaya, Cyberjaya, and central Kuala Lumpur are provided by the nearby FT 29 Putrajaya–Cyberjaya Expressway and the Maju Expressway (MEX).

=== Public transport ===
The township is adjacent to Salak Tinggi ERL station, which is served by the KLIA Transit line operated by Express Rail Link. The service links the area northward to Putrajaya Sentral, Bandar Tasik Selatan, and KL Sentral, and southward to both terminals of Kuala Lumpur International Airport (KLIA).

A local shuttle buggy service operates within the township, connecting major residential phases, commercial plazas, and Xiamen University with the Salak Tinggi ERL station. The buggy route begins at the Sunsuria City Celebration Centre and serves Bell Suites, Bell Avenue, Concord College International School, Seni Residences, Tangerine Suites, Jasper Square, The Olive, Monet Lily, Giverny Walk, Monet Garden, Monet Springtime and Xiamen University Malaysia before returning to the Celebration Centre and continuing to Salak Tinggi station.
