= Salak Tinggi ERL station =

Airport rail link station in Sepang, Selangor, Malaysia

KT4 Salak Tinggi
- Renovated station entrance in October 2026

General information
- Other names: Malay: سالق تيڠݢي (Jawi); Chinese: 沙叻丁宜; Tamil: சாலாக் திங்கி
- Location: Salak Tinggi, Sepang District, Selangor, Malaysia
- Coordinates: 2°49′32.6″N 101°42′48.2″E
- Owner: Express Rail Link
- Operator: Express Rail Link
- Line: 7 KLIA Transit
- Platforms: 2 island platforms
- Tracks: 4
- Connections: Smart Selangor SPG2; Rapid KL On-Demand T735B

Construction
- Structure type: At-grade
- Parking: Multi-storey park-and-ride
- Accessible: Yes

Other information
- Station code: KT4

History
- Opened: 20 June 2002; 24 years ago

Services
Preceding station	Express Rail Link	Following station
Putrajaya & Cyberjaya towards Kuala Lumpur Sentral	KLIA Transit	KLIA T1 towards KLIA T2
KLIA Ekspres does not stop here
Location

Salak Tinggi ERL station is an airport rail link station in Salak Tinggi, Sepang District, Selangor, Malaysia. Served by the Express Rail Link's (ERL) KLIA Transit service, the station provides regional commuter access between KL Sentral and Kuala Lumpur International Airport (KLIA). It primarily serves the communities of Salak Tinggi, Bandar Baru Salak Tinggi, Kota Warisan, and Sunsuria City.

== History ==
The station opened on 20 June 2002 alongside the launch of commercial KLIA Transit services between KL Sentral and KLIA.

Between 2025 and 2026, the station underwent a phased enhancement programme to improve passenger capacity and circulation. Phase 1 upgraded the main concourse, fare gates, wayfinding signage, digital flight and passenger information displays, and expanded commercial retail space along the walkway connecting to the park-and-ride facility.

== Station layout and facilities ==
The station is built at ground level beneath a signature wave-shaped roof canopy. It features four tracks arranged around two island platforms. Regular KLIA Transit commuter services stop at the two inner tracks (Tracks 2 and 3), while the outer tracks (Tracks 1 and 4) are reserved for passing trains, including non-stopping KLIA Ekspres services and operational bypasses.

Platform level	Track 1	← Non-passenger / passing track
Platform level	Island platform, doors will open on the left
Platform level	Track 2	7 KLIA Transit towards KT1 KL Sentral (←)
Platform level	Track 3	7 KLIA Transit towards KT6 KLIA Terminal 2 (→)
Platform level	Island platform, doors will open on the left
Platform level	Track 4	Non-passenger / passing track →
Concourse level	Concourse	Fare gates, ticketing counters, ticket machines, customer service office, covered linkbridge to park-and-ride

A dedicated multi-storey park-and-ride facility with over 1,000 parking bays directly adjoins the station, connected via a covered overhead pedestrian linkway.

== Bus connections ==
Salak Tinggi station is served by local feeder and stage bus services:

Route	Operator	Origin	Destination	Via
SPG2	Smart Selangor	KLIA Terminals 1 & 2	Pusat Penjaja Taman Seroja	Salak Tinggi ERL station, Kota Warisan
T735B	Rapid KL On-Demand (DRT)	Salak Tinggi ERL station	Kota Warisan	Bandar Baru Salak Tinggi, IKTBN Sepang

== Around the station ==
- Kota Warisan
- Sunsuria City
- Xiamen University Malaysia

== Gallery ==
Station exterior prior to renovation in 2021

Platform canopy in May 2025

KLIA Transit train at Platform 2

Concourse fare gates during upgrade works in 2025

Covered linkway to the park-and-ride

Refurbished station entrance in October 2026

Renovated walkway with purple signage
