= Prasarana Malaysia =

Malaysian government-owned public transport operator

Prasarana Malaysia Berhad
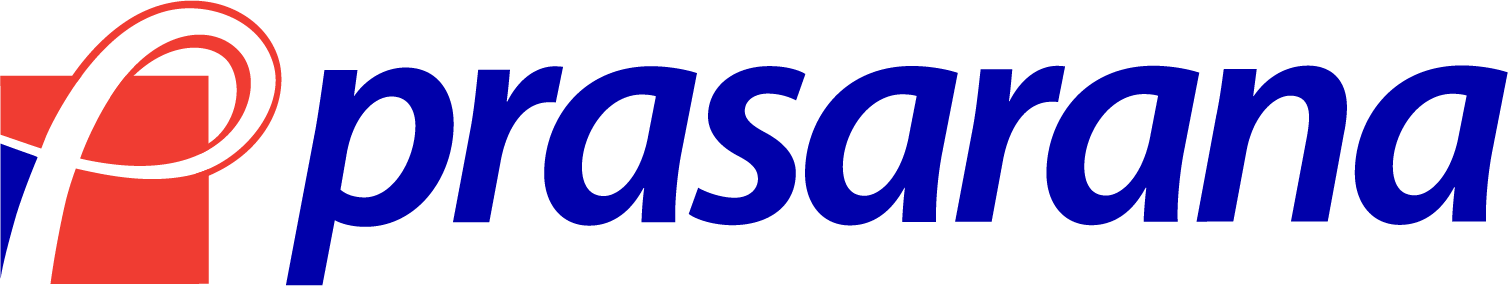

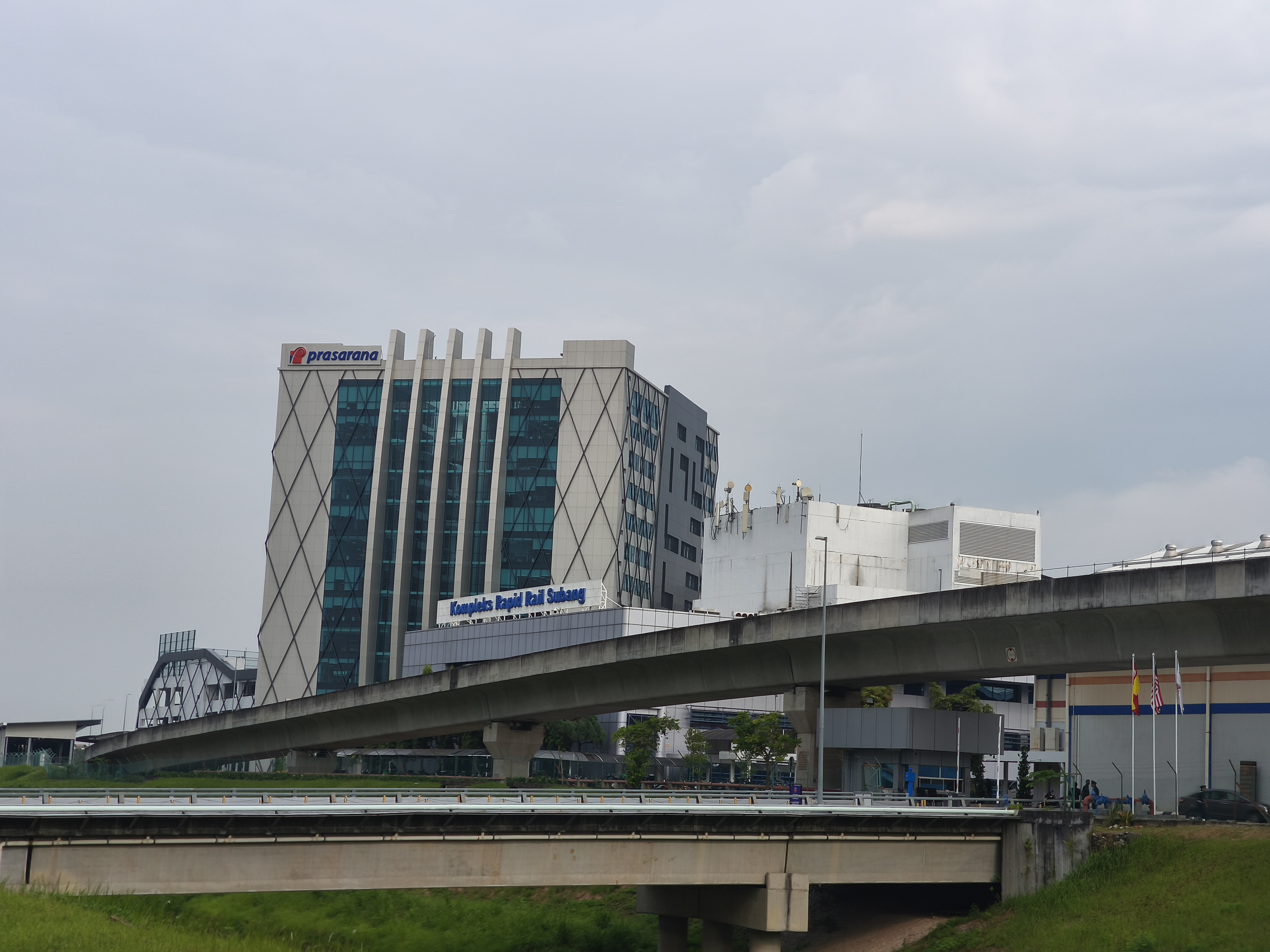
- Menara Prasarana at Ara Damansara
- Type: State-owned enterprise
- Industry: Public transportation
- Founded: 11 August 1998; 28 years ago
- Headquarters: Menara Prasarana, Jalan PJU 1A/46, Ara Damansara, 47301 Petaling Jaya, Selangor, Malaysia
- Key people: Tan Sri Mohd Nasir Ahmad (Chairman); Dr. Prodyut Dutt (Acting PGCEO, Group COO - Strategy and Development); Ts. Mazli Mustaffa (CEO, Rapid Rail); Syahrul Azmir Ahmad Zaki (CEO, Rapid Bus); Syed Redza Algadrie (CEO, PRIDE)
- Services: Asset owner and operator of public transport: • Light rapid transit (LRT) • Mass rapid transit (MRT) • Monorail • Bus rapid transit (BRT) • Stage bus & On-Demand transit • Mobility vans
- Number of employees: 13,718 (2025)
- Parent: Minister of Finance Incorporated
- Website: www.prasarana.com.my

Prasarana Malaysia Berhad
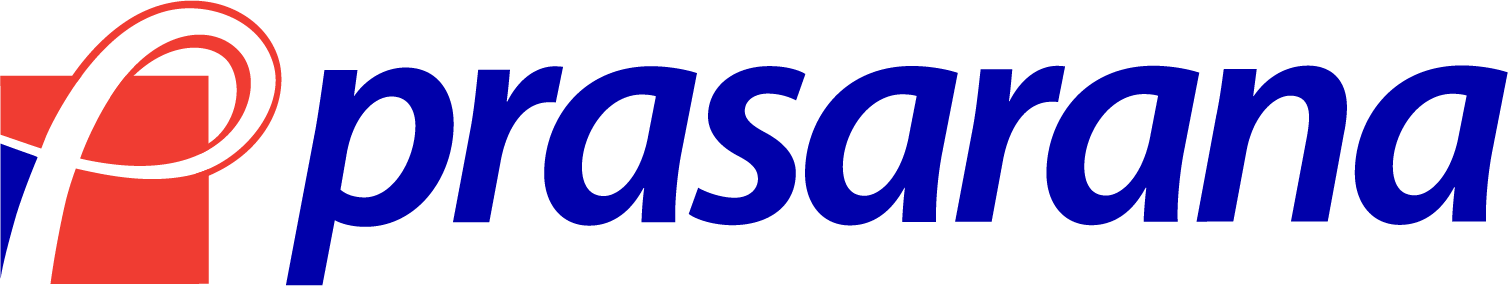

Overview
- Headquarters: Petaling Jaya, Selangor
- Reporting mark: Prasarana
- Locale: Klang Valley (Selangor & Kuala Lumpur), Penang
- Dates of operation: 1998–present

Technical
- Track gauge: 1,435 mm (4 ft 8 1/2 in) standard gauge (except KL Monorail)
- Electrification: 750 V DC
- Length: 243 kilometres (151 mi) (operational rail network)

Prasarana Malaysia Berhad (Prasarana) (English: Malaysian Infrastructure Limited) is a Malaysian government-owned company set up by the Ministry of Finance to own, manage, and operate multi-modal public transport assets across Malaysia. Established in 1998 under the Minister of Finance (Incorporation) Act 1957, Prasarana was formed as part of a strategic government initiative to restructure and integrate the country's urban public transportation system.

It is the largest public transport operator in Malaysia by daily ridership, servicing an average of 1.31 million passenger trips daily across its combined urban rail, stage bus, and feeder transit networks. Operations are driven through several primary subsidiaries, including Rapid Rail, Rapid Bus, and Prasarana Integrated Development (PRIDE).

== Subsidiaries ==
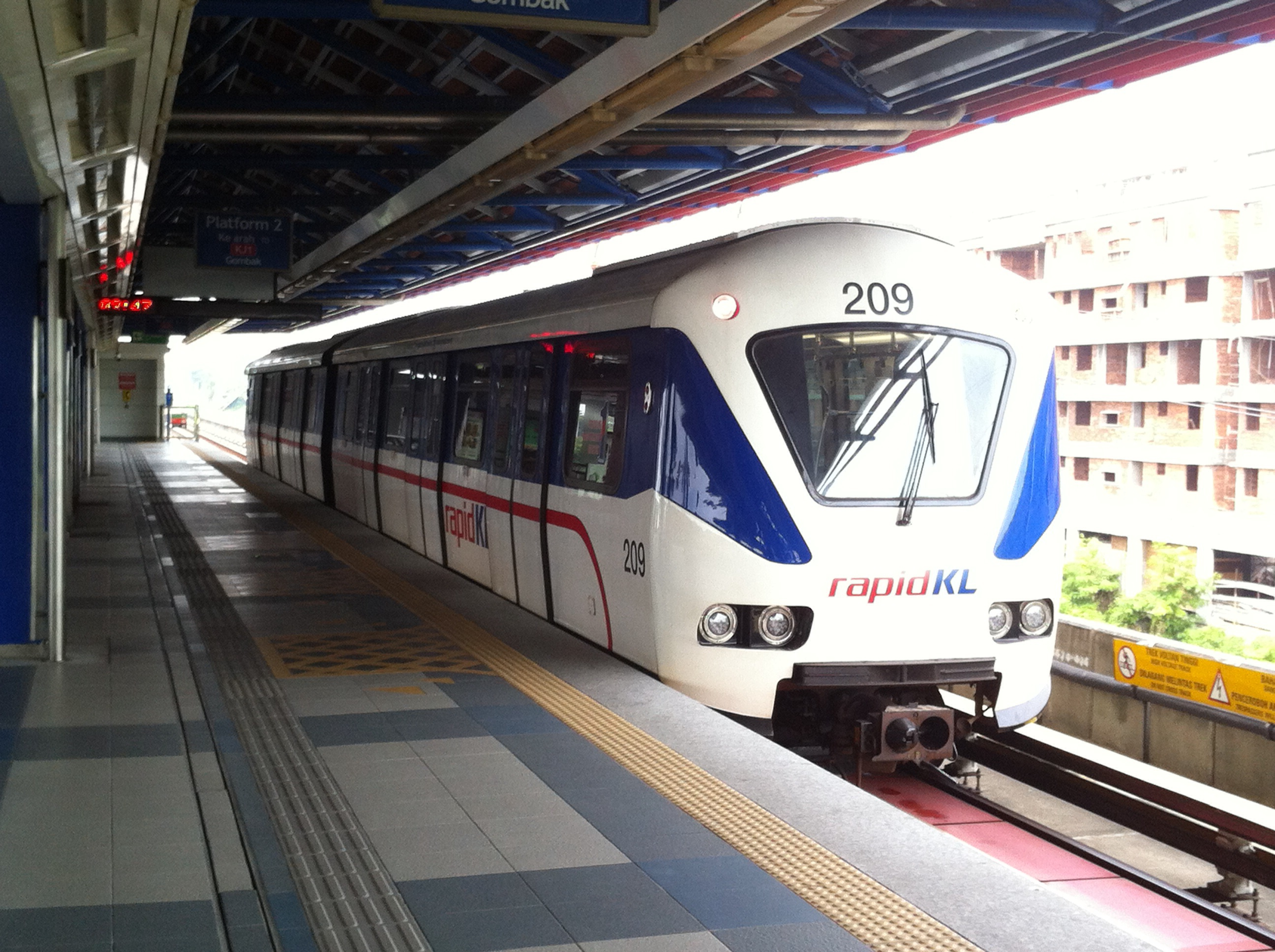
Rapid KL Bombardier Innovia Metro 200 train operated by Rapid Rail

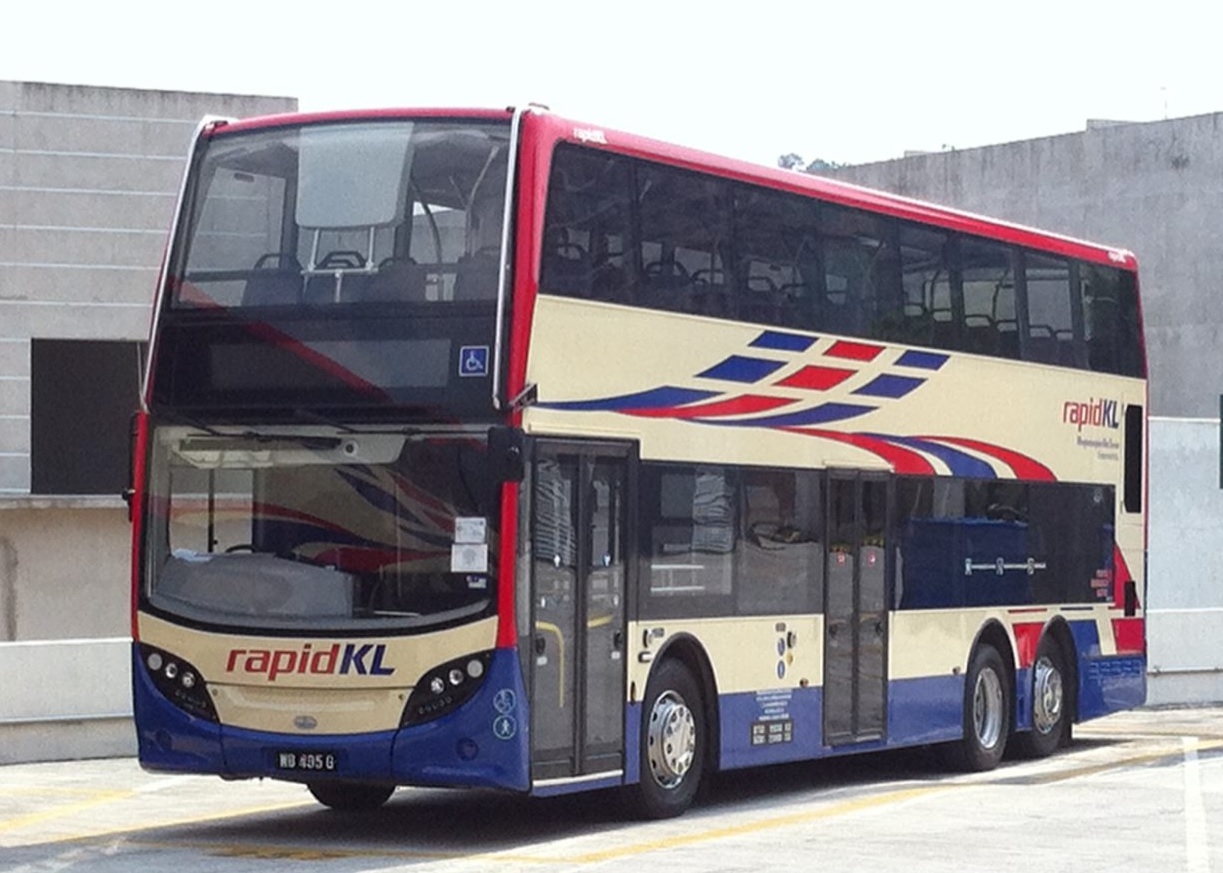
Rapid KL Alexander Dennis Enviro500 MMC double-decker bus operated by Rapid Bus

Prasarana operates its core transit assets, infrastructure developments, and operations through specialized wholly owned subsidiaries:

- Rapid Rail Sdn Bhd – Operates urban rail systems across Klang Valley under the Rapid KL network.
- Rapid Bus Sdn Bhd – Operates stage buses, bus rapid transit, feeder routes, and demand-responsive transit (Rapid On-Demand) across Klang Valley and Penang.
- Prasarana Integrated Development Sdn Bhd (PRIDE) – Manages commercial development, transit-oriented development (TOD) projects, retail spaces, advertising, and non-fare revenue assets across transit stations and corridors.
- Prasarana RTS Operations Sdn Bhd (PROSPER) – Operates international cross-border rail links via its joint venture entity, RTS Operations Pte Ltd (RTSO), formed with Singapore's SMRT Corporation for the RTS Link.
- Prasarana Integrated Management & Engineering Services Sdn Bhd (PRIME) – Provides technical consultancy, asset engineering, project management, and infrastructure upkeep for Group projects.

== Service brands ==
- Rapid KL – Integrated rapid transit (LRT, MRT, Monorail) and bus network across the Klang Valley.
- Rapid Penang – Bus network and Rapid On-Demand services across Penang Island and Seberang Perai.
- Rapid On-Demand (ROD) – App-based, demand-responsive feeder van network launched in May 2023 to improve first- and last-mile transit connectivity.
  - Klang Valley: 237 vans serving 71 zones.
  - Penang: 50 vans serving 11 zones.
  - Served 13,211 passengers in 2025 across both regions.
- Rapid Mobiliti – Specialized door-to-door transit service equipped with hydraulic wheelchair lifts for Persons with Disabilities (PwDs) and senior citizens. Served 9,154 passengers in 2025 across Klang Valley and Penang.
- MyRapid PULSE – Official mobile application for multi-modal travel planning, ticketing, and digital passes. Over 556,000 Digital My50 passes were sold via the app between July and December 2025.
- My50 / Mutiara Pass – Subsidized unlimited travel passes. In 2025, 3.13 million My50 passes were sold in the Klang Valley, while 267,898 Mutiara Passes were issued in Penang.

=== Former brands ===
- Rapid Ferry – Operated cross-strait Penang ferry services between 1 August 2017 and 31 December 2020.
- Rapid Kamunting – Operated local bus services in Kamunting and Taiping, Perak, between 2016 and 2021.
- Rapid Kuantan – Stage bus network serving Kuantan, Pahang until 2025.

== Key performance statistics ==
As of late 2025, Prasarana reported key operational and sustainability statistics across its transit network:

- Daily Network Ridership: Averages 1.31 million passenger trips per day across rail and bus networks. An all-time daily peak of 1.63 million riders was recorded during New Year's Eve 2025.
- Private Vehicle Displacement: Replaces an estimated 377,000 private vehicles on roads daily, enabling an estimated 225,000 tonnes of avoided CO₂ emissions annually through modal shift.
- Rail Reliability (MKBF): The Group-wide Mean Kilometre Between Failure (MKBF) reached 790,000 km across rail lines in 2025, surpassing its target of 590,000 km. Individual lines including the Ampang Line, Kajang Line, and Putrajaya Line achieved 1.0 million MKBF, while the KL Monorail exceeded 150,000 km MKBF.
- Bus Network Scale: Operates 406 routes supported by 12 bus depots, with a Level of Service (LOS) fleet of 1,390 buses.

== Operations ==
=== Rail and bus operations ===
- Rapid Bus Sdn Bhd: Operates over 400 routes using a fleet of over 1,700 buses and feeder vehicles across Kuala Lumpur, Selangor and Penang. It operates the BRT Sunway Line, Malaysia's first fully elevated electric bus rapid transit corridor.
- Rapid Rail Sdn Bhd: Manages and operates 168 rail stations spanning over 243 kilometers across 7 main operational lines:
  - 3 Ampang Line
  - 4 Sri Petaling Line
  - 5 Kelana Jaya Line
  - 8 KL Monorail
  - 9 Kajang Line
  - 11 Shah Alam Line
  - 12 Putrajaya Line

=== International operations ===
- Al Mashaaer Al Mugaddassah Metro Southern Line (Saudi Arabia): Prasarana was awarded the shadow operator, operations, and maintenance contract for the Makkah Metro during the Hajj pilgrimage season from 2014 to 2017.
- RTS Link (Malaysia–Singapore): Operated under RTS Operations Pte Ltd (RTSO), a joint venture between PROSPER and SMRT, providing cross-border rapid transit services between Bukit Chagar station in Johor Bahru and Woodlands North station in Singapore (expected opening late 2026).

== Sustainability and innovation ==
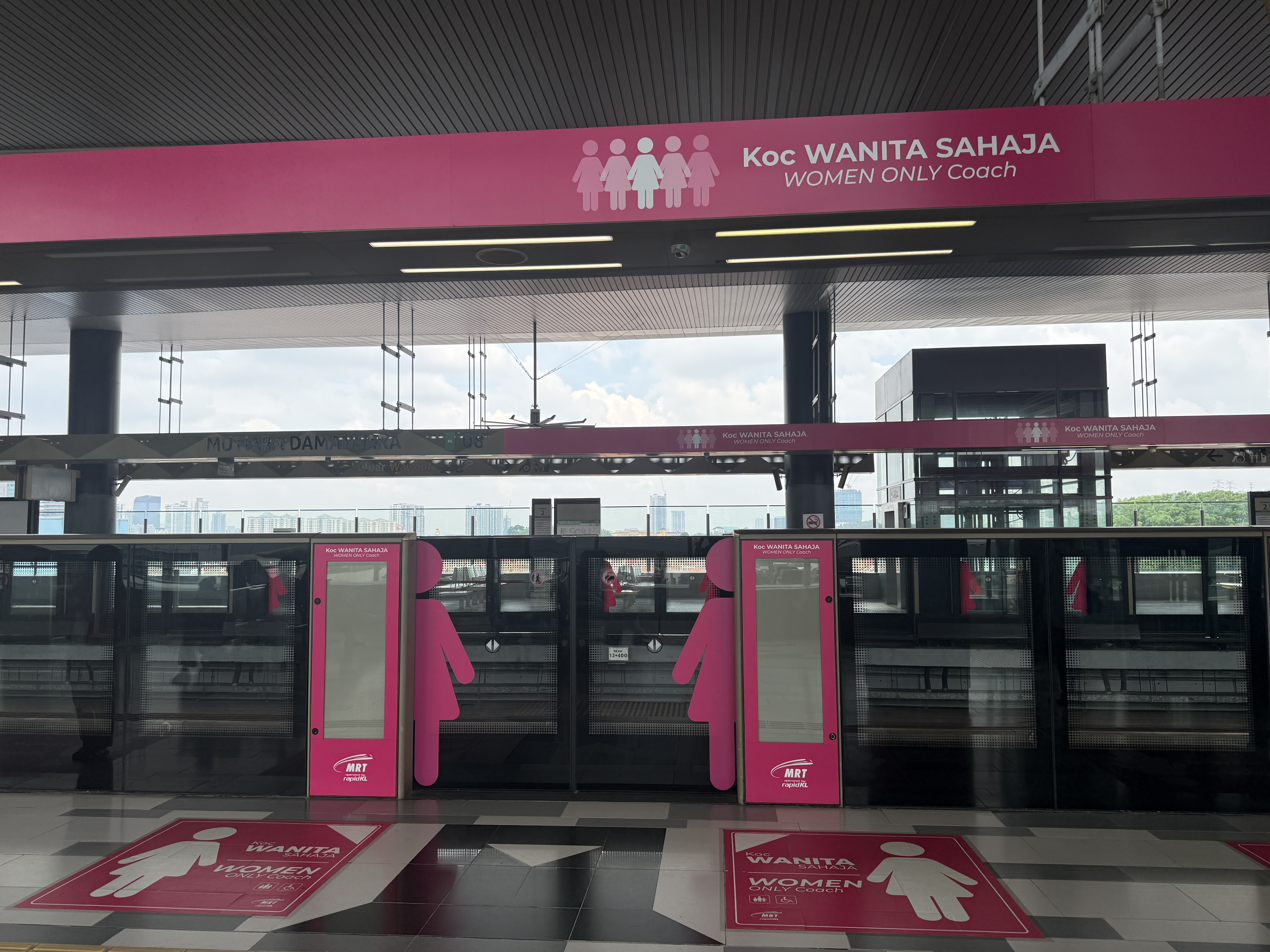
Women's Coach at MRT Kajang Line

Under its Sustainability Blueprint 2023–2030, Prasarana has implemented several environmental and social governance initiatives:

- Artificial Reef Project: In July 2024, Prasarana repurposed two decommissioned LRT Kelana Jaya Line train coaches by submerging them off Tioman Island, Pahang, creating Malaysia's first artificial reef constructed from retired rail cars.
- Resource Conservation: Collected 770 kg of used cooking oil (UCO) for biofuel conversion and upcycled 100 sets of decommissioned staff uniforms into 400 pouches, diverting 120 kg of textile waste. Train wash facilities on the Ampang Line utilize closed-loop water recycling, reducing municipal water consumption by 82.5%.
- Solar Power Deployment: Installed solar photovoltaic (PV) systems across the BRT Sunway line, depots, and 6 stations, avoiding over 734 CO2 in emissions.
- Safety & Passenger Experience: Expanded dedicated Women's Coaches across the Kajang, Putrajaya, and Ampang lines, contributing to a 13.89% drop in reported sexual harassment cases between 2024 and 2025. Security operations are reinforced by nearly 1,000 auxiliary police personnel.

== Commercial and transit-oriented development ==
Through its commercial arm PRIDE, Prasarana manages non-fare revenue channels including station advertising, retail partnerships, and transit-oriented developments (TOD):

- TOD Rating Framework: Developed in collaboration with PLANMalaysia to evaluate walkability, transit proximity, and density around rail corridors.
- SME Community Support: Reserves 20% to 30% of retail outlets across 91 train stations for Small and medium enterprises (SMEs) and underserved communities at subsidized rental rates.
- Station Rejuvenation: Partnered with Kuala Lumpur City Hall (DBKL) on urban placemaking projects, including the rejuvenation of the Masjid Jamek LRT station area.

== Station naming rights programme ==
In October 2015, Prasarana introduced Southeast Asia's first station naming rights programme. The commercial initiative allows corporate brands to bid for naming, branding, and signage privileges at selected LRT, MRT, and Monorail stations across the network while retaining the geographic location name for navigation.

GGICO (Dubai Metro) is example of the first project in the world to start the similar program. This step has been followed by Vodafone–Sol (Madrid Metro) and Atlantic Avenue–Barclays Center (New York City Subway).

The prefix (or in most recent rebrands, suffix) name of the station will be given to the successful bidder and the bidder has a right on the elements around the stations such as station area, route maps, pamphlets and brochures, operator website and also the train destination announcement. According to the source of Prasarana Malaysia, the original name of the station is fixed to indicate the location of the station.

First of its kind in Southeast Asia, the first three pilot projects on LRT and monorail stations were launched for the AirAsia-Bukit Bintang Monorail station, Bank Rakyat-Bangsar LRT station and KL Gateway-Universiti LRT station on 10 October 2015.

On 1 May 2017, the CGC-Glenmarie LRT station became the fourth station renamed under the programme. On 29 May 2023, the KL Sentral LRT staion was renamed as the KL Sentral-redONE LRT station in a five-year deal with redONE Network Sdn Bhd. In October 2025, Bandaraya-UOB LRT station became the sixth and latest station in the Rapid Rail network to be renamed under the programme.

The programme was also extended to stations owned by MRT Corp but operated by Rapid Rail as part of Rapid KL. On 11 July 2017, a week before the launching of the MRT Kajang Line Phase 2 operations, another four stations joined under the programme. Upon the opening of the MRT Putrajaya Line, the programme was also launched for five stations on the line.

=== Active station naming agreements ===
Line	Station name and code
3 Ampang Line 4 Sri Petaling Line	AG6 SP6 Bandaraya–UOB; AG9 SP9 BBCC–Hang Tuah
5 Kelana Jaya Line	KJ11 Kampung Baru–Co-opbank Pertama; KJ15 KL Sentral–redONE; KJ16 Bangsar–Bank Rakyat
8 KL Monorail	MR4 BBCC–Hang Tuah
9 Kajang Line	KG06 Kota Damansara–Thomson Hospital; KG07 Surian–IOI Mall Damansara; KG10 Taman Tun Dr Ismail–Deloitte; KG13 Pavilion Damansara Heights–Pusat Bandar Damansara; KG17 Merdeka–Maybank; KG18A Pavilion Kuala Lumpur–Bukit Bintang; KG22 Maluri–AEON
11 Shah Alam Line	SA12 Dato' Menteri – SA Sentral (PKNS); SA15 Seksyen 7 Shah Alam–Pet World
12 Putrajaya Line	PY19 Raja Uda–Institut Jantung Negara; PY22 Conlay–Kompleks Kraf; PY39 Cyberjaya Utara–Finexus

=== Expired and reverted naming contracts ===
Line	Station code and current name	Former branded name
5 Kelana Jaya Line	KJ19 Universiti; KJ27 Glenmarie	KL Gateway–Universiti; CGC–Glenmarie
8 KL Monorail	MR6 Bukit Bintang	AirAsia–Bukit Bintang
9 Kajang Line	KG14 Semantan; KG20 Tun Razak Exchange	Manulife–Semantan; Tun Razak Exchange–Samsung Galaxy
12 Putrajaya Line	PY19 Raja Uda; PY23 Tun Razak Exchange; PY40 Cyberjaya City Centre	Raja Uda–UTM; Tun Razak Exchange–Samsung Galaxy; Cyberjaya City Centre–Limkokwing

== Major expansion projects ==
=== LRT Shah Alam Line (LRT3) ===
The Shah Alam Line (LRT3) expands rail transit access across the western corridor of Klang Valley, spanning 37.8 km from Bandar Utama to Johan Setia in Klang through 25 stations. Operations commenced in June 2026. Five additional provisional stations are scheduled for opening by 2031.

=== Bus fleet electrification ===
In line with the National Energy Transition Roadmap (NETR), Prasarana has committed to a phased transition toward achieving a 100% electric bus fleet by 2037. Early phases involve procuring over 1,600 electric buses alongside depot charging infrastructure across Klang Valley and Penang. The initiative is rolling out in two phases, deploying 250 units in Phase 1 and 1,350 units in Phase 2, supported by EV depot upgrades across Klang Valley and Penang.

=== Johor Bahru–Singapore RTS Link ===
A strategic bilateral cross-border rail project connecting Bukit Chagar station in Johor Bahru, Malaysia, to Woodlands North station in Singapore. Designed with a capacity to carry up to 10,000 passengers per hour per direction across its 4 km corridor, reducing causeway traffic congestion. Scheduled to commence operations at the end of 2026.

== History ==
=== Restructuring Klang Valley public transport ===
In the late 1990s, the Klang Valley's public transport network faced severe financial and operational fragmentation. Following commercial operations of the early LRT lines, ridership fell well short of projections. Consequently, concessionaires Sistem Transit Aliran Ringan Sdn Bhd (Star-LRT) and Projek Usahasama Transit Ringan Automatik Sdn Bhd (Putra-LRT) defaulted on commercial loans, a situation compounded by the 1997 Asian financial crisis.

Concurrently, private city bus operations deteriorated. Major consortia like Intrakota and Cityliner suffered deep financial losses, leading to poor maintenance, aging bus fleets, and erratic scheduling. Public transport share in Klang Valley plummeted to approximately 16% of total passenger trips.

=== Formation of Prasarana ===
To solve these challenges, the Malaysian government initiated a restructuring model separating public transit infrastructure ownership (capital expenditure) from operations:

- Syarikat Prasarana Negara Berhad was incorporated in August 1998 to acquire, consolidate, and own infrastructure and rolling stock assets.
- RapidKL (under Rangkaian Pengangkutan Intergrasi Deras Sdn Bhd) was established in 2004 to manage operational delivery across the acquired transit assets.

Between 2002 and 2004, Prasarana systematically acquired the assets, debt liabilities, and operations of Putra-LRT, Star-LRT, Intrakota Komposit, and Cityliner. In 2007, Prasarana acquired the KL Monorail network and launched Rapid Penang to revamp public transport in Penang. In 2014, the corporate structure was further streamlined, establishing specialized subsidiaries under Prasarana Malaysia Berhad.

=== Setting up of Syarikat Prasarana Negara Berhad and Rangkaian Pengangkutan Intergrasi Deras Sdn Bhd ===
As part of the restructuring process, the Malaysian government proposed to separate the ownership (thus capital expenditure) and operational aspects of public transport, with separate government-owned companies being set up for each purpose.

In 1998, Prasarana was incorporated to "facilitate, coordinate, undertake and expedite infrastructure projects approved by the Malaysian government". It took over the assets and operations of Star-LRT, Putra-LRT and Putraline feeder bus services in September 2002, changing the name Star-LRT to "Starline" and Putra-LRT to "Putraline". In 2003, Prasarana entered into agreements with Intrakota and Cityliner for the purchase of buses. The purchase was completed in 2004.

Rangkaian Pengangkutan Intergrasi Deras Sdn Bhd, the second government-owned company under the restructuring, was set up in 2004 to handle the operational aspects of the assets owned by Prasarana. Prasarana handed over the operations of the two LRT lines and buses in November 2004.

In 2006, the government set up a new company Rapid Penang as a subsidiary of Rangkaian Pengangkutan Intergrasi Deras Sdn Bhd to operate a bus service in Penang. The buses are also owned by Prasarana.

=== Taking over of assets ===
==== Projek Usahasama Transit Ringan Automatik Sdn Bhd (Putra-LRT) ====
Putra-LRT was incorporated in Malaysia on 15 February 1994 to design, construct, finance, operate and maintain the Klang Valley's LRT system, known today as the Kelana Jaya Line. The company, which was 100% owned by Renong Berhad, signed the concession agreement with the Malaysian government on 7 August 1995. To fund the project, Putra-LRT obtained a RM2 billion loan, comprising RM1 billion conventional facility and RM1 billion Islamic facility, from 27 Malaysian financial and non-financial institutions which was arranged by four major Malaysian financial institutions, namely Commerce International Merchant Bankers Bhd (CIMB), Bank Bumiputra Malaysia Bhd (BBMB), Commerce MGI Sdn Bhd (CMGI) and Bank Islam. The 27 institutions included the KWSP (EPF), Affin Bank and Public Bank.

The takeover of Putra-LRT can be said to have started from 30 September 1999 when the payment of interest amounting to RM44,589,020.33 became due. Failure to pay resulted in the entire loan amount becoming due. At that time, Putra-LRT had already requested the Corporate Debt Restructuring Committee of Malaysia's central bank, Bank Negara, to help restructure its debts. A proposal by the Corporate Debt Restructuring Committee, which involved the government taking over the two LRT lines and then leasing them back to the two companies, was deemed not acceptable.

The restructuring began moving again when the government accepted the concept of setting up two separate government-owned companies, one to own and the other to operate public transport. The first step towards nationalisation of Putra-LRT took place on 26 November 2001 when Prasarana acquired all the rights, benefits and entitlements under the loan from Putra-LRT's and also Star-LRT's lenders (see below for takeover of Star-LRT). This effectively made Prasarana the creditor of Putra-LRT and Star-LRT. The loans owed by both companies stood at approximately RM5.7 billion at that time. The purchase consideration was satisfied via the issuance of RM5.468 billion fixed rate serial bonds by Prasarana guaranteed by the government to the respective Star-LRT and Putra-LRT lenders. According to the Corporate Debt Restructuring Committee, the successful resolution of the debt restructuring of the two companies was estimated to have reduced the level of non-performing loans in the Malaysian banking system by RM2.9 billion or 0.7% on a net six-month basis. Commerce International Merchant Bankers Bhd was appointed as was appointed as facility agent.

On 8 December 2001, Prasarana issued Putra-LRT with a notice of default and demanded payment of all outstanding amounts within 14 days. Putra-LRT replied on 24 December 2001 and informed Prasarana that it was not able to settle the amounts. It also requested the government to appoint another party or itself to purchase the assets of the company in accordance with the terms of the concession agreement between Putra-LRT and the government. A statutory demand, required under the Malaysian Companies Act 1965, was then issued by Prasarana on 26 December 2001 asking Putra-LRT to settle the amount owing within 21 days. Putra-LRT again replied on 17 January 2002 by saying that it was unable to settle the amounts owed and requested the government to take over. Winding up petitions were filed on 8 February 2002 and served on the company on 20 March 2002. On 26 April 2002, the Kuala Lumpur High Court made an order for the winding up of Putra-LRT and on the same date, appointed the Gan Ah Tee, Ooi Woon Chee and Mohamed Raslan Bin Abdul Rahman as liquidators. Earlier on 3 April 2002, the Malaysia Ministry of Finance had officially announced that the government via Prasarana was taking over the assets of both Putra-LRT and Star-LRT.

On 30 August 2002, Putra-LRT entered into a sale and purchase agreement with Prasarana for the sale of all its assets. The consideration for the sale consisted of the balance after the project cost of RM5,246,070,539 is offset by the amount of debt owed to Prasarana, plus the project cost from 1 April 2002 until 1 September 2002 which was set as the completion date of the sale, plus a sum of RM16,867,910 being the "unverified amount of project costs" which was subsequently verified by supporting documents. The entire cost of Prasarana taking over Putra-LRT's assets was reported to be RM4.5 billion.

Prasarana took over Putra-LRT assets and operations from 6.00 a.m. on 1 September 2002.

==== Sistem Transit Aliran Ringan Sdn Bhd (STAR-LRT) ====
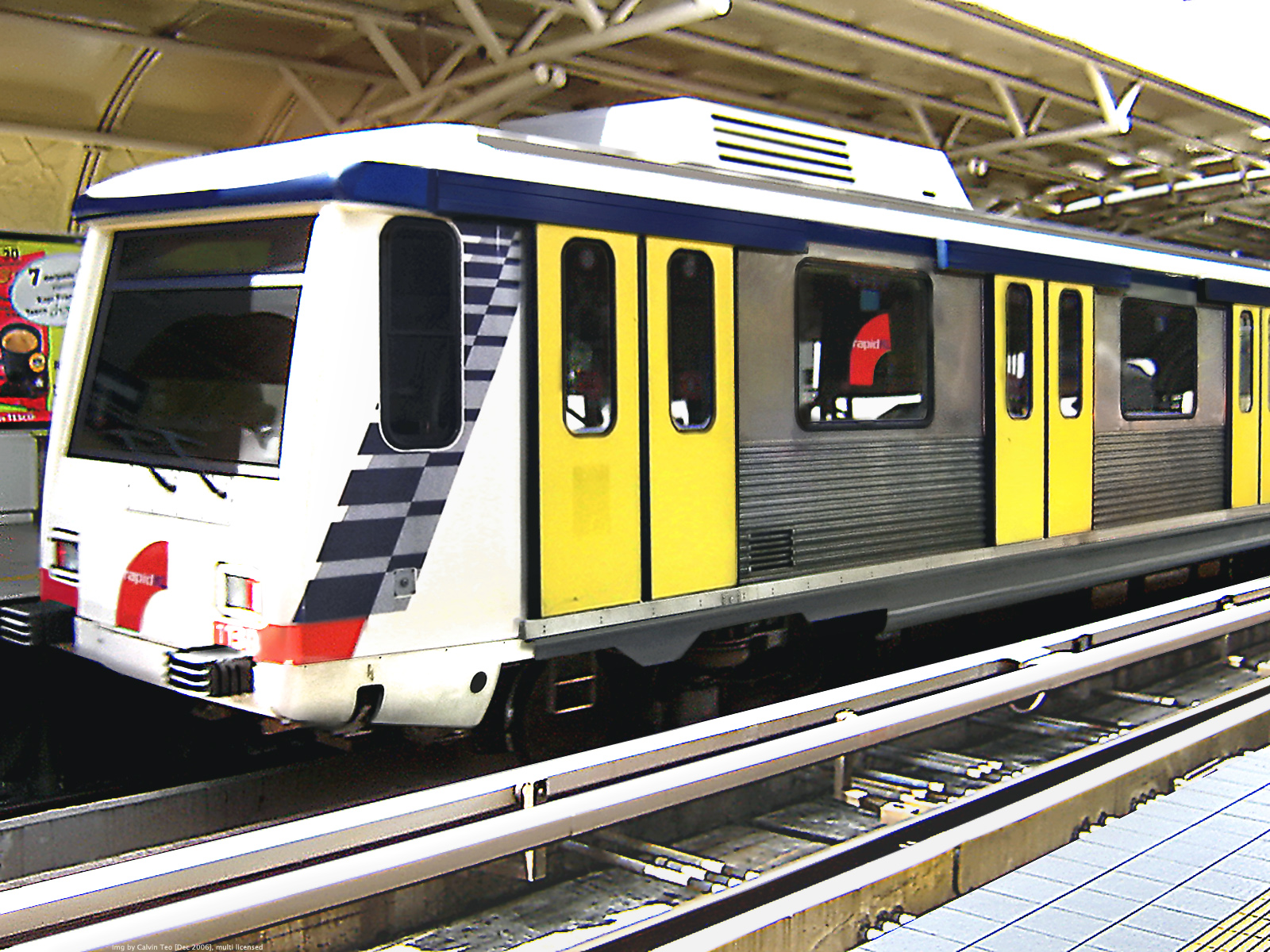
The original STAR LRT train livery carrying Rapid KL brand service in December 2006.

Details of the takeover of Sistem Transit Aliran Ringan Sendirian Berhad (abbreviated to Star-LRT), which operated what is known today as the Ampang Line, are a little more difficult to come when compared with the takeover of PUTRA-LRT because the company was not owned by any public listed company. The shareholders of Star-LRT, which was formed on 13 November 1991, were the Malaysian Employees Provident Fund (25%), Kuala Lumpur Transit Group Assets Sdn Bhd (a 50:50 joint venture between Germany's AEG Pte Ltd, the electronics division of Daimler-Benz, and British construction firm Taylor-Woodrow) (30%), Lembaga Urusan Tabung Haji (Pilgrims’ Fund Board) (15%), Lembaga Tabung Angkatan Tentera (5%), Kumpulan Wang Amanah Pencen (5%), STLR Sdn Bhd (5%) and Shell Malaysia/Sabah/Sarawak (5%), American International Assurance Co Ltd (10%), Apfin Investments Pte Ltd, the investment arm of the Singapore Government (5%). The 60-year concession agreement between Star-LRT and the Malaysian government for Phase One of the project (between Sultan Ismail and Ampang stations) was signed on 22 December 1992 while the separate concession agreement for Phase Two (between Chan Sow Lin and Sri Petaling stations, and Sultan Ismail and Sentul Timur stations) was signed on 26 June 1995. The cost of Phase One was RM1.2 billion and RM2.2 billion for Phase Two. Star-LRT raised loans amounting to RM800 million for Phase One and RM1.32 billion from Bank Bumiputra Malaysia Bhd for Phase Two.

In the late 1990s, Star-LRT, like Putra-LRT, also defaulted in its loan repayment and on 30 November 2001, the Corporate Debt Restructuring Committee of Malaysia's central bank Bank Negara announced that Prasarana had taken over the debts of Star-LRT together with that of Putra-LRT. The combined debt of both companies amounted to RM5.5 billion.

On 8 December 2001, Prasarana issued a letter of demand for a sum of RM1,045,681,273.83 owing as at that date pursuant to a facility agreement entered on 13 August 1993. There was however no reply. On 10 December 2001, another letter of demand was issued to Star-LRT for a sum of RMI,498,538,278.58 pursuant to a loan agreement dated 17 July 1995 for the financing of Phase Two of the project. On 26 December, it served statutory notice of demand on STAR-LRT, again asking for the return of the sum and the company only managed to make part payment.

Two petitions to wind up Star-LRT were filed with the High Court on 21 February 2002 for the failure to pay RM1,051,509,127.16 as at 26 December 2001 for the first loan and the failure to repay the second loan amounting to RM1,506,385,705.28 as of 26 December. On 3 May 2002, the High Court appointed Gan Ah Tee, Ooi Woon Chee and Mohamed Raslan Abdul Rahman as temporary liquidators.

On 1 September 2002, Prasarana took over the assets and operations of Star-LRT. The takeover reportedly cost the government RM3.3 billion.

==== Intrakota Komposit Sendirian Berhad ====
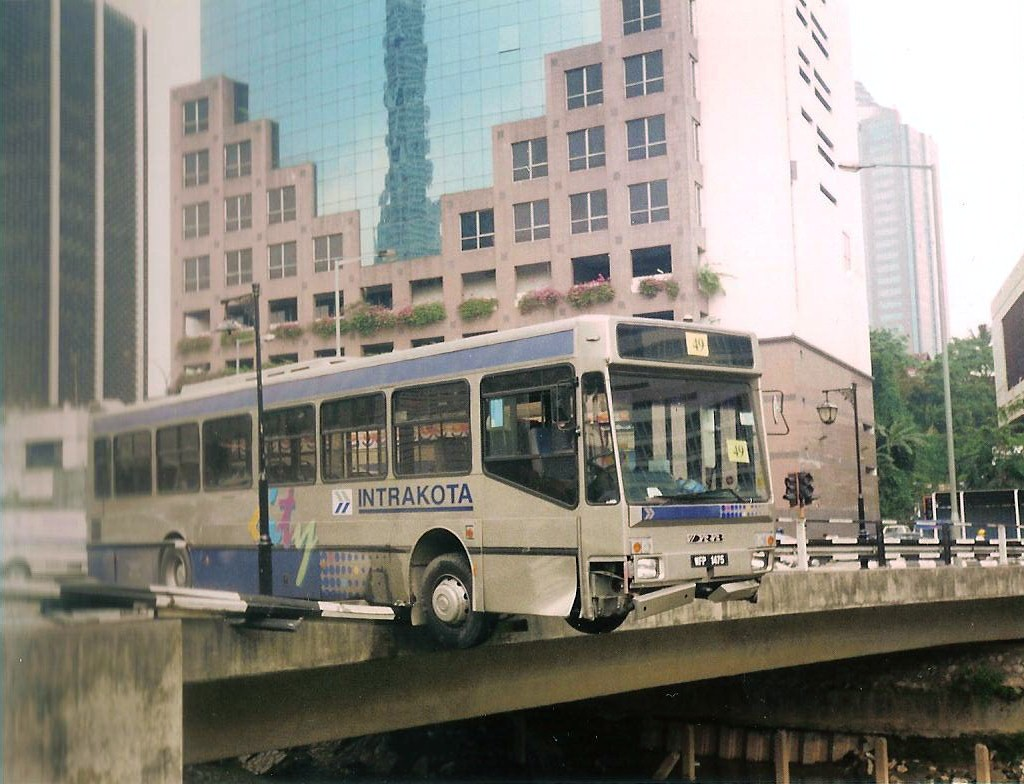
An Intrakota bus accident at Jalan Munshi Abdullah, KL, 1997.

Intrakota Komposit Sendirian Berhad, a subsidiary of public-listed company DRB-Hicom Berhad, was one of two consortia picked in 1994 to run the city/stage bus service in Kuala Lumpur and its surrounding suburbs. The other company was Park May Berhad which operated its buses under the brandname Cityliner. Under the policy, Intrakota bought and took over the routes of two traditional Kuala Lumpur bus companies, namely SJ Kenderaan Sendirian Berhad (better known as Sri Jaya) and Toong Fong Omnibus Company Sendirian Berhad, one of Kuala Lumpur's first bus companies. Intrakota also took over most of Kuala Lumpur's minibus routes after the government terminated their services in 1998. All buses were branded as Intrakota.

The circumstances leading to Intrakota's financial difficulties could be blamed on the 1997 Asian financial crisis, the decreasing number of people using public transport and the failure by the government to implement the two-bus-consortia policy which resulted in unexpected competition.

In 1999, the Intrakota group of companies came under the purview of the government's Corporate Debt Reestructuring Committee and when the committee concluded its business in June 2002, Intrakota and its parent company DRB-Hicom continued negotiating with the government which eventually led to its buses being taken over by Prasarana.

The company's dire situation was clear when on 29 January 2003, creditors RHB Finance Berhad and RHB Delta Finance Berhad repossessed 34 of its buses. The buses were returned to Intrakota after several rounds of negotiations with the creditors. On the same day, it also revealed that it was being sued or a total of RM25,893,558.36 by AMMerchant Bank Berhad (RM11,234,839.93), Kewangan Bersatu Berhad (RM1,091,939.12) and Sogelease Advance (Malaysia) Sendirian Berhad (RM13,566,786.31). Later, when restructuring the debt of Intrakota, DRB-Hicom declared that the company had an accumulated debt of RM258 million as at 30 June 2003, comprising a principal sum of RM188.2 million and interest amounting to RM69.8 million.

On 29 October 2003, Intrakota, together with its subsidiaries Intrakota Consolidated Berhad, SJ Kenderaan Sendirian Berhad, Toong Fong Omnibus Company Sendirian Berhad, Syarikat Pengangkutan Malaysia Sendirian Berhad and SJ Binteknik Sendirian Berhad, as well as another DRB-Hicom subsidiary Euro Truck and Bus (Malaysia) sendirian Berhad, entered into a sale and purchase agreement with Prasarana for the sale of their bus related assets for a total of RM176,975,604. The original acquisition costs of the assets were approximately RM557.4 million, which were acquired over a period of 9 years since 1994. The net book value of the assets as at 30 June 2003 was approximately RM269.9 million.

The sale of assets to Prasarana was completed on 5 May 2004. On the same day, Prasarana signed an interim operations and maintenance agreement with Intrakota Consolidated for the temporary operation of the bus network previously operated by Intrakota. The interim arrangement was terminated when Prasarana handed over the operations to RapidKL in November 2004.

In May 2008, the Malay Mail ran an article investigating the fate of the remaining Intrakota buses. 1,000 Iveco TurboCities that were originally purchased at a cost of RM0.5 million each were found abandoned in Batang Kali and Rawang, each only guarded by a single security personnel. Criticism was directed at RapidKL on what is seen as a 'wasteful exercise', the old buses being only 7 to 15 years old and more expensive than the newly purchased Mercedes-Benz buses by RapidKL.

==== Cityliner Sendirian Berhad ====
The Cityliner buses involved in the takeover by Prasarana were those operated by two companies – Cityliner Sendirian Berhad and Len Chee Omnibus Company Sendirian Berhad – in Kuala Lumpur under the brand name “Cityliner”. The two companies were subsidiaries of previously public-listed Park May Berhad, which in turn was a subsidiary of Renong Berhad. Cityliner, which was incorporated on 30 August 1994, was wholly owned by Park May while Park May owned 85% of Len Chee.

In 1995, Cityliner took over routes previously operated by Len Omnibus Company Berhad, Selangor Omnibus Company Berhad and Foh Hup Transportation Company Berhad which were within a 15 km radius of the city centre of Kuala Lumpur under the government's policy of having two bus consortia to operate city buses in the Klang Valley. Len Chee was incorporated on 29 December 1937 and was one of the pioneer bus companies in Kuala Lumpur. It was bought over by Park May in 1995 under the same government policy.

Cityliner was also the brand name for bus services in parts of Seberang Perai, Penang; parts of Negeri Sembilan state; Kuantan, Pahang; and between Klang and Sabak Bernam in Selangor. These services, known as the “northern”, “southern”, “eastern" and "central groups” respectively, were not involved in the takeover by Prasarana.

Operating city or stage buses has always been Park May's main business. However, the group, which also operates long-distance express bus services began making losses following tough operation circumstances, with city/stage bus operations contributing a huge proportion of these losses. Besides a reduction in the number of public transport users, the company also blamed the government's failure to implement its earlier policy of only having two bus consortia, one of which was Park May, to operate city buses in Kuala Lumpur for its financial difficulties. This began affecting its bus operations as lack of maintenance caused frequent breakdowns, resulting in unreliable service.

Park May, on 1 March 1999, applied to the Corporate Debt Restructuring Committee to seek the assistance to restructure its debts.

On 27 October 2003, Cityliner and Len Chee signed an asset sale and purchase agreement with Prasarana for the sale of 321 buses and 43 buses owned by Cityliner and Len Chee respectively for a total cash consideration of RM14,841,012. Of this amount, RM13,456,649 was to be used as part redemption of the commercial paper/medium term notes programme which was obtained on 23 January 2007, and RM1,220,000 was to go towards defraying the expenses of the sale to Prasarana. The sale was completed on 30 April 2004 for a total adjusted cash consideration of RM14,438,920 for 347 buses.

Upon completion of the sale, Prasarana appointed Kenderaan Mekar Murni Sdn Bhd, a subdiary of Kumpulan Kenderaan Malaysia Berhad, to operate the buses on an interim basis until it handed over operations to RapidKL in November. Under Park May's restructuring scheme, Kumpulan Kenderaan Malaysia ultimately instituted a reverse-takeover of Park May and assumed Park May's listed status under the new name Konsortium Transnasional Berhad.

=== Important dates ===
- 11 August 1998: Prasarana incorporated to facilitate, co-ordinate, undertake and expedite infrastructure projects approved by the Malaysian government.
- 1 September 2002: Prasarana begins operations when it took over the ownership and operations of Star-LRT, Putra-LRT and the Putraline feeder bus services. It renamed Star-LRT Starline while Putra-LRT became known as Putraline.
- 6 January 2003: Prasarana takes over ownership and operations of the Langkawi Cable Car from Langkawi Cable Car Sdn Bhd. It forms Panorama Langkawi Sdn Bhd to operate the system.
- 27 October 2003: Prasarana buys Cityliner buses and routes from Park May Bhd. It then appoints Kenderaan Mekar Murni Sdn Bhd to operate the bus routes on an interim basis.
- 29 October 2003: Prasarana buys Intrakota buses from DRB-Hicom Bhd but allows Intrakota operating as interim operator.
- November 2004: Prasarana hands over operations of the LRT and bus network to Rapid KL.
- 13 October 2006: Prasarana signs an agreement with a Bombardier-Hartasuma joint venture for the purchase of 22 four-car train sets for the Kelana Jaya Line with an option to purchase an additional 13 train sets for RM1.2 billion. First 22 train sets to be delivered in 2008.
- 19 February 2007: Malaysian Prime Minister Abdullah Ahmad Badawi announced that the bus network in Penang will undergo a revamp similar to that which occurred in Kuala Lumpur. A day later, Malaysian Finance Minister parliamentary secretary Hilmi Yahaya said the new entity will be named Rapid Penang.
- 25 February 2007: Malaysian Second Finance Minister Nor Mohamed Yakcop said 150, at a cost of RM50mil, will make their first appearance on Penang roads in August 2007. He said Rapid Penang will be a subsidiary of Rapid KL.
- 31 July 2007: RapidPenang begins operations, offering commuters free rides, after being launched by Prime Minister Abdullah Ahmad Badawi. The company started charging passengers three days later on 3 August 2007.
- 8 October 2007: Prasarana purchase additional 52 train sets from Bombardier, using options from 2006 purchase. Delivery expected in 2010.
- 27 November 2007: Prasarana signed a sales and purchase agreement with KL Monorail System Sdn Bhd to be the operator of KL Monorail. Prasarana will assume all KLMS Sdn Bhd loan to Bank Pembangunan of RM882 million
- 1 July 2009: RapidKL become a wholly owned subsidiary of Prasarana.
- 1 September 2009: RapidPenang become a wholly owned subsidiary of Prasarana.

== Gallery ==
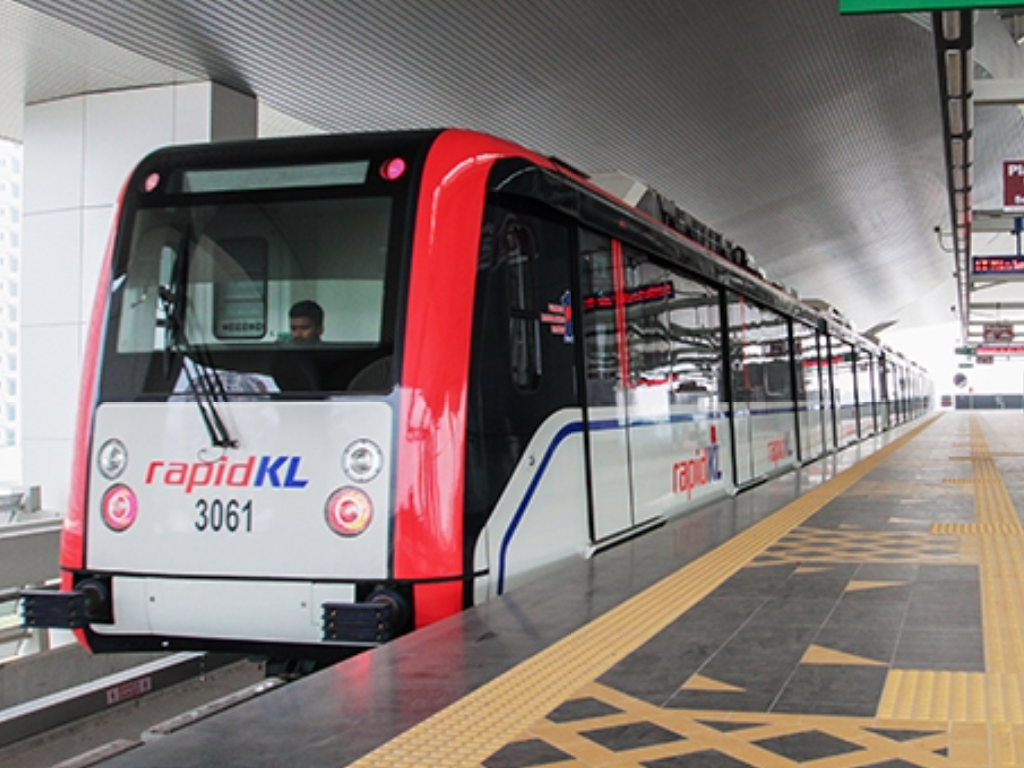
An Ampang & Sri Petaling Lines LRT train

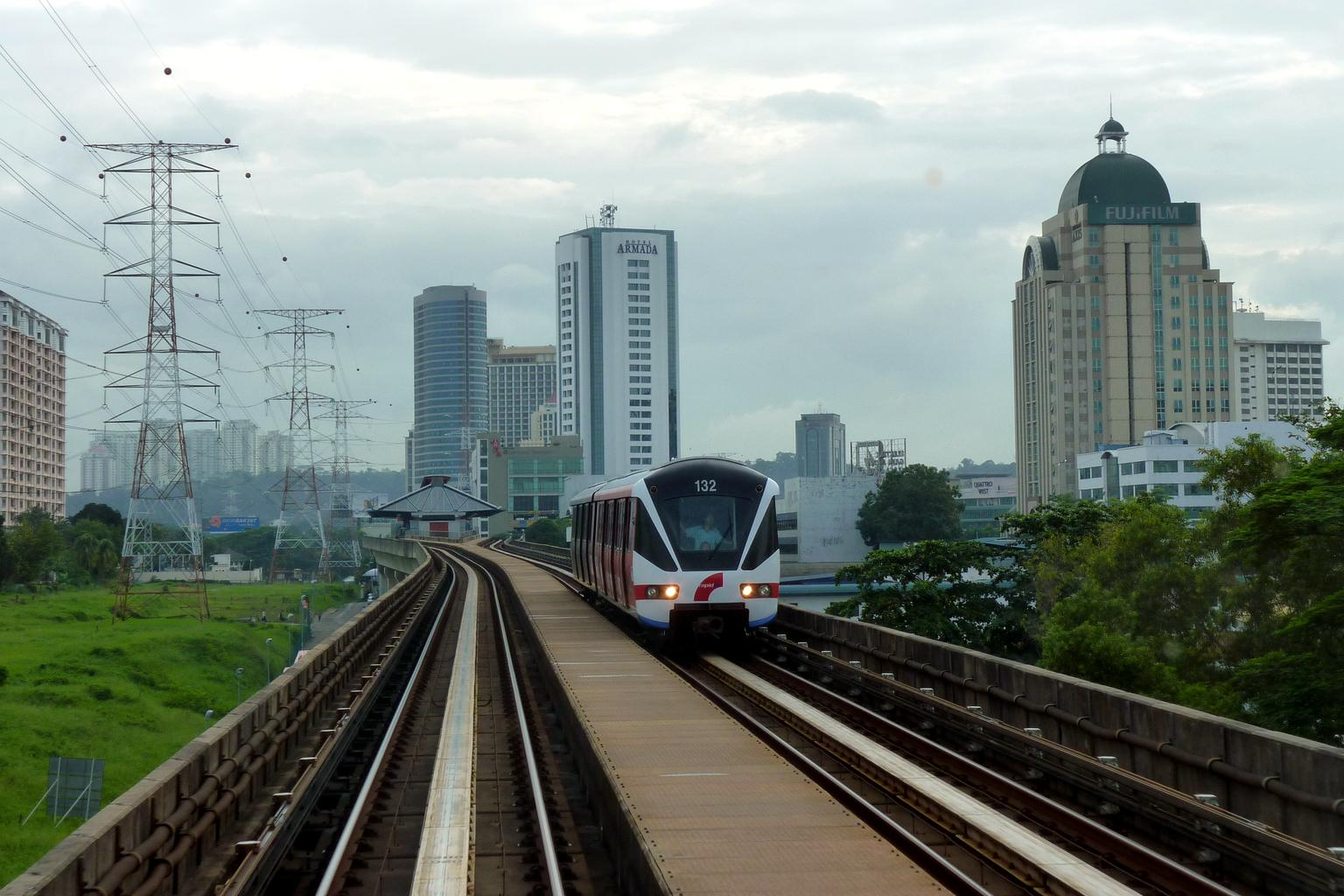
A Kelana Jaya Line Innovia Metro 300 train

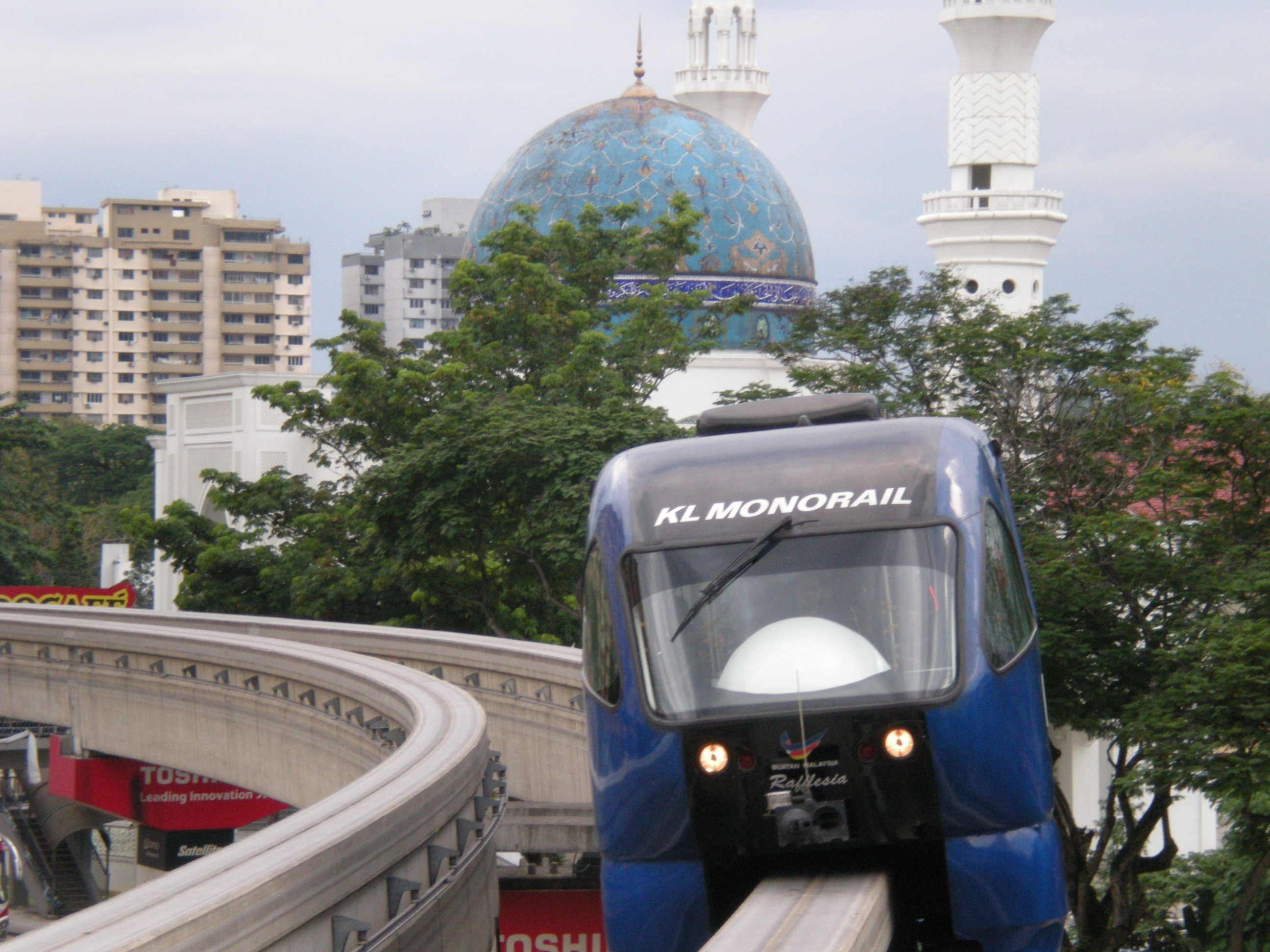
A KL Monorail 4-car trainset

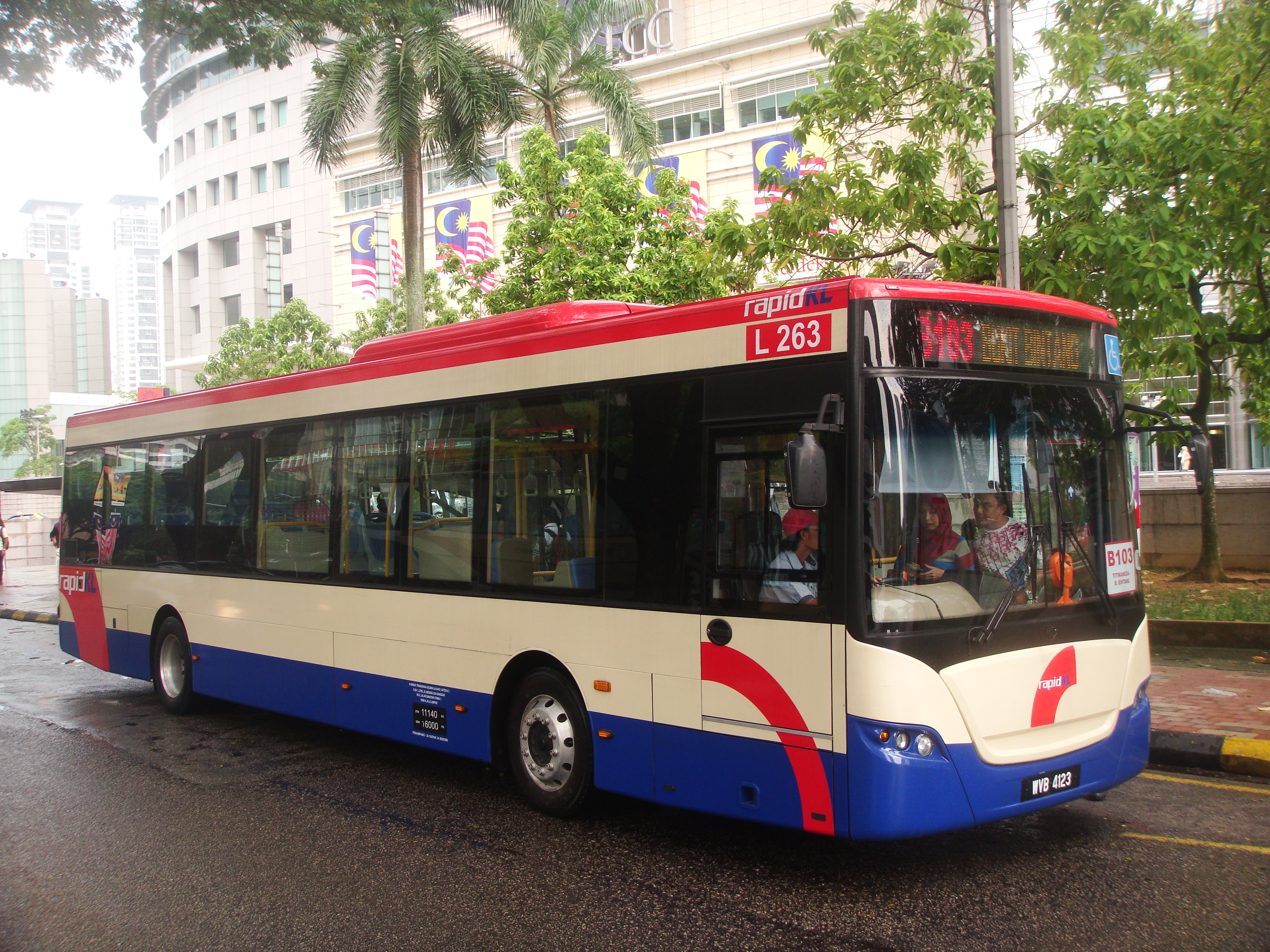
A Rapid KL single-deck stage bus

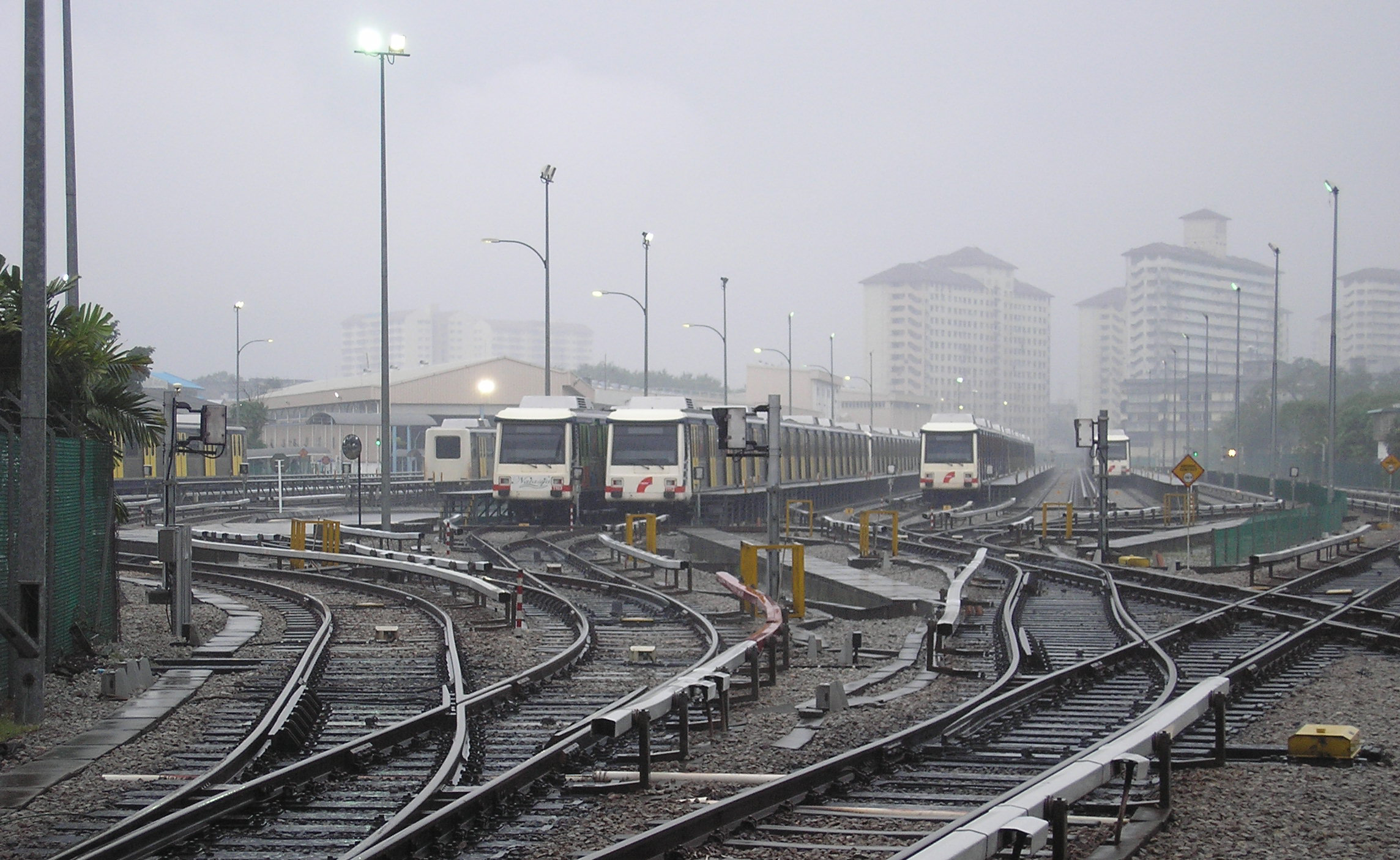
Rapid Rail Ampang Depot

== See also ==
- Public transport in Kuala Lumpur
- Rail transport in Malaysia
- MRT Corp
- APAD
