= Pulau Meranti =

Village in Sepang, Selangor, Malaysia

Coordinates: 2°57′N 101°38′E

- Village
- Interactive map of Pulau Meranti
- Country: Malaysia
- State: Selangor

Government
  - Administered by: Majlis Perbandaran Sepang (Sepang Municipal Council)
- Time zone: UTC+8 (MST)
- Postcode: 47100, 47120
- Area code: +603-80
- Website: www.mpsepang.gov.my

Pulau Meranti is a village in Sepang District, Selangor, Malaysia.

== History ==
It has an area estimated at more than 100 hectares, explored and founded by a Dato' Gede Biro Bin Jenangkin ('Gede' meaning big in Javanese and 'Biro', an origin from Palembang, Indonesia) around the 1890s.

Until today, the fourth and fifth generation descendants of Dato' Gede Biro still reside in this village and the original residents of this village use Palembang dialect as a spoken dialect of Malay in daily conversations.

== Features ==
Pulau Meranti village is divided into five areas:

1. Kampung Masjid (name given because it has the only mosque located in the village)
2. Kampung Pulau Meranti Dalam (part of it is now a new housing development known as Taman Putra Perdana)
3. Pulau Ibol (lost due to development)
4. Kampung Batu Sembilan
5. Kampung Sg Rasau
6. Pulau serbok

== Notable events ==
On 8 March 2014, the Malaysia Airlines Flight 370 disappeared with 239 people on board, following its last contact with air traffic control 41 minutes after take-off. On 9 March 2014, the Government of Malaysia had established an Operations Coordination Centre at the National Disaster Command Centre (NDCC) in Pulau Meranti, Cyberjaya to monitor the development of the situation.

== Transportation ==
=== Car ===
The SKVE, MEX and LDP highways run around the boundaries of this village, as well as Jalan Puchong.

=== Public transportation ===
The nearest railway/metro station is the Putrajaya/Cyberjaya ERL station on the KLIA Transit system. A station on the MRT Putrajaya Line Line will be built near this village.

Causeway Link bus 608 goes towards IOI Puchong Jaya LRT station via Puchong Utama bus hub, Batu 14 Puchong and Bandar Puteri Puchong. The Puchong Utama bus hub connects with RapidKL bus 600, towards Pasar Seni, Kuala Lumpur.
