= Cyberjaya Utara MRT station =

Metro station in Selangor, Malaysia

Coordinates: 2°57′00.3″N 101°39′26.1″E

PY39 Cyberjaya Utara – Finexus

General information
- Other names: Malay: سايبرجاي اوتارا (Jawi); Chinese: 赛城北; Tamil: சைபர்ஜெயா உத்தாரா
- Location: Off Persiaran APEC, 47100 Cyberjaya; Selangor; Malaysia
- System: Rapid KL
- Owner: MRT Corp
- Operator: Rapid Rail
- Line: 12 Putrajaya Line
- Platforms: 1 island platform
- Tracks: 2

Construction
- Parking: Available
- Accessible: Yes

Other information
- Status: Operational
- Station code: PY39

History
- Opened: 16 March 2023; 3 years ago

Services
Preceding station		Following station
16 Sierra towards Kwasa Damansara	Putrajaya Line	Cyberjaya City Centre towards Putrajaya Sentral
Location

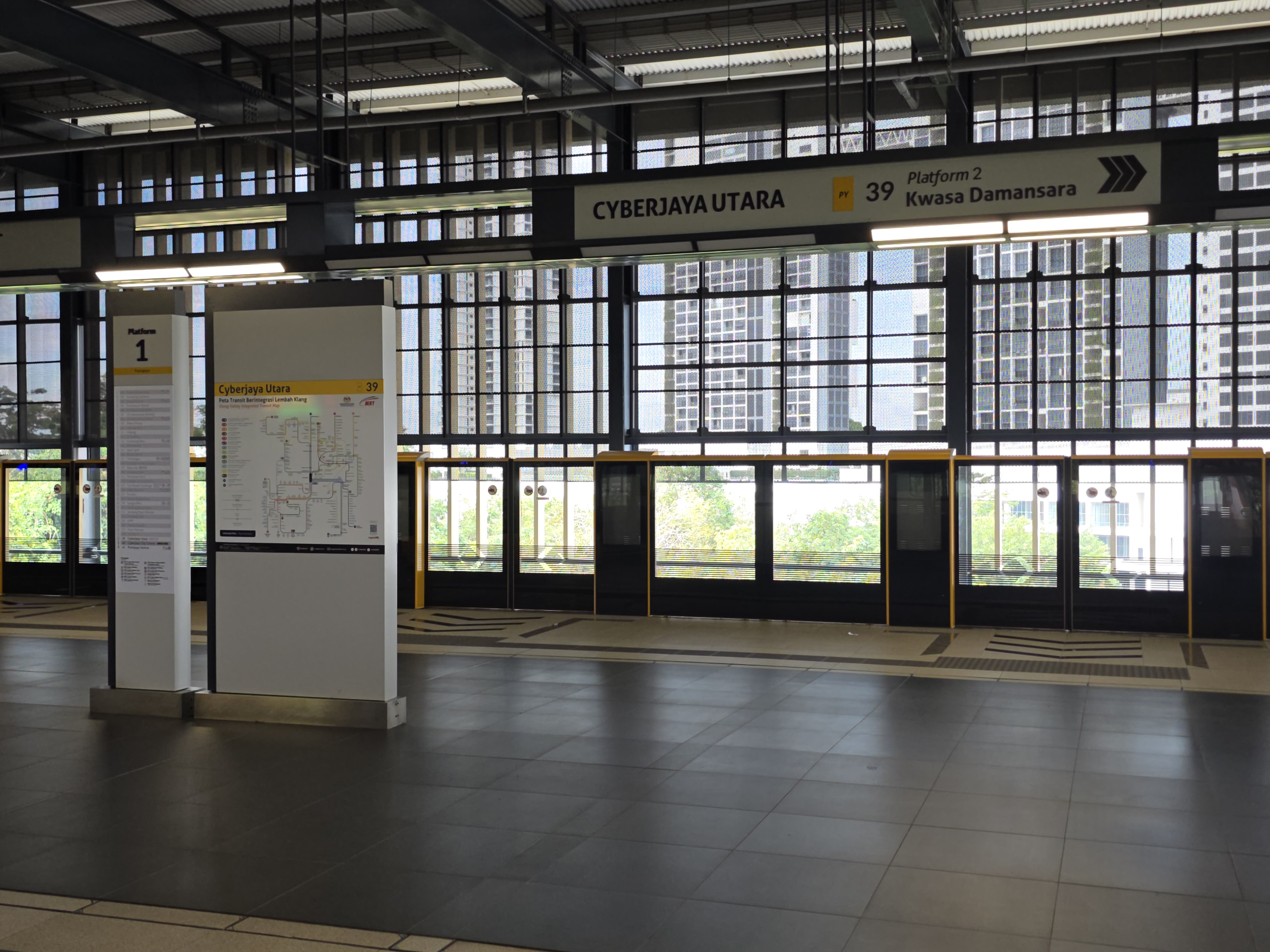
The station's platform level

The Cyberjaya Utara MRT station, or Cyberjaya Utara–Finexus MRT station under the station naming rights programme, is a mass rapid transit (MRT) station on the MRT Putrajaya Line. It is one of the two train stations that serve the city of Cyberjaya, the other being Cyberjaya City Centre.

== Location ==
The elevated station is located along Persiaran APEC on the outskirts of Cyberjaya, approximately 5 km from the actual city centre. The nearest residential and commercial complex, Skypark @ Cyberjaya, is located opposite the station.

== Facilities ==
Facilities equipped at the station include:

- Park and ride
- Toilets
- Muslim prayer rooms
- Lifts
- Escalators

The nearby Skypark @ Cyberjaya also provides park and ride facilities along with free shuttle to MRT station.

== Bus Services ==
=== Feeder buses ===
Route No.	Origin	Destination	Via	Connecting to
T504	PY39 Cyberjaya Utara	Cyber 11	Jalan Teknokrat 1; Jalan Teknokrat 2; Persiaran Semarak Api; Raja Haji Fisabilillah Mosque; Persiaran Sepang; Jalan Fauna 1; Persiaran Ceria; Persiaran Multimedia; Multimedia University; Persiaran Bestari; University of Cyberjaya	T505 T506T507
T505	PY39 Cyberjaya Utara	Taman Pinggiran Cyber	Persiaran APEC; Jalan Teknokrat 1; Jalan Teknokrat 2; Jalan Teknokrat 3; D'Pulze Mall; Persiaran Multimedia; Multimedia University; Tamarind Square; Autoville Cyberjaya; Hospital Cyberjaya	T504 T506, T507

== Passenger Statistics ==
In 2025, the station recorded an average of 41,108 monthly passengers (boarding passengers only).
