= 16 Sierra MRT station =

Metro station in Selangor, Malaysia

PY38 16 Sierra

General information
- Other names: Malay: سيکستين سييرا (Jawi); Chinese: 十六岭; Tamil: 16 சியாரா
- Location: Persiaran Sierra Utama, 16 Sierra, 47110 Puchong; Selangor; Malaysia
- Coordinates: 2°57′55.6″N 101°39′17.6″E
- System: Rapid KL
- Owner: MRT Corp
- Operator: Rapid Rail
- Line: 12 Putrajaya Line
- Platforms: 1 island platform
- Tracks: 2

Construction
- Accessible: Yes

Other information
- Status: Operational
- Station code: PY38

History
- Opened: 16 March 2023; 3 years ago

Services
Preceding station		Following station
Putra Permai towards Kwasa Damansara	Putrajaya Line	Cyberjaya Utara towards Putrajaya Sentral
Location

The 16 Sierra MRT station is a mass rapid transit (MRT) station that serves the suburb of 16 Sierra and Pulau Meranti in Puchong, Selangor, Malaysia. It is one of the stations built as part of the Klang Valley Mass Rapid Transit (KVMRT) project on the MRT Putrajaya Line.

== Location and facilities ==
The MRT station is located at the southern end of Persiaran Sierra Utama, adjacent to the Maju Expressway (MEX).

Currently, only Entrance B is operational, providing access to a lay-by with drop-off and pick-up zones, a taxi stand, and a bus stop. Entrance A is marked as a future development phase.

== Bus services ==
As of its opening, there are no dedicated feeder bus services provided by Rapid Bus for this MRT station. Passengers commuting from 16 Sierra and the nearby Pulau Meranti area primarily rely on private vehicles, e-hailing services, or park-and-ride facilities to access the station. However, Rapid KL On-Demand (DRT) services are available for a flat fare of RM2.00 per journey, providing first- and last-mile connectivity between the station and the surrounding 16 Sierra and Taman D'Alpinia residential areas.
