= Cyberjaya City Centre MRT station =

Metro station in Selangor, Malaysia

Coordinates: 2°56′18.4″N 101°39′57.1″E

PY40 Cyberjaya City Centre
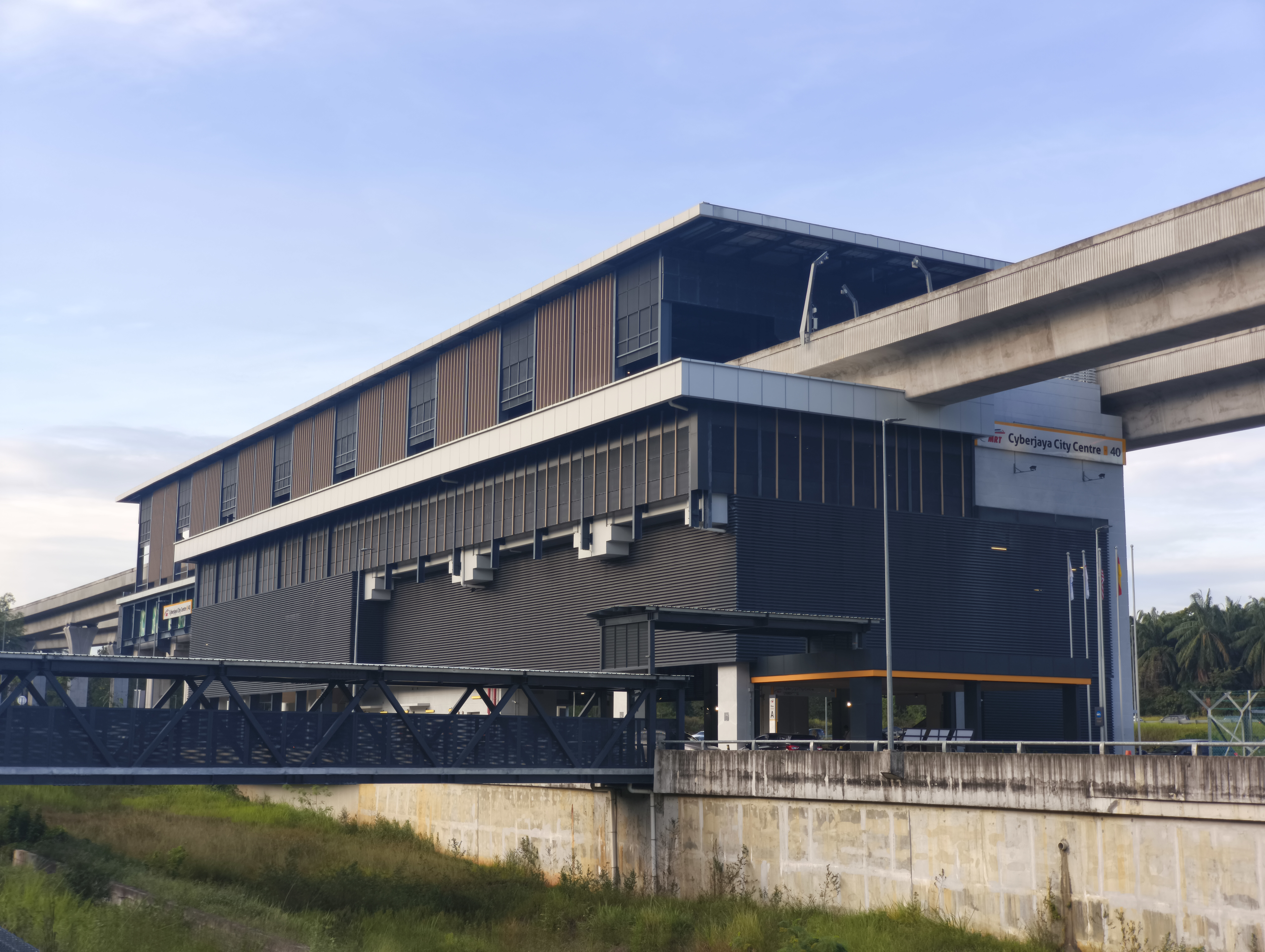

General information
- Other names: Malay: سايبرجاي سيتي سينتر (Jawi); Chinese: 赛城市中心; Tamil: சைபர்ஜெயா நகர மையம்
- Location: Off Persiaran APEC, 47100 Cyberjaya; Selangor; Malaysia
- System: Rapid KL
- Owner: MRT Corp
- Operator: Rapid Rail
- Line: 12 Putrajaya Line
- Platforms: 1 island platform
- Tracks: 2

Construction
- Parking: None
- Accessible: Yes

Other information
- Status: Operational
- Station code: PY40

History
- Opened: 16 March 2023; 3 years ago
- Former names: Cyberjaya City Centre – Limkokwing (2023–2025)

Services
Preceding station		Following station
Cyberjaya Utara towards Kwasa Damansara	Putrajaya Line	Putrajaya Sentral Terminus
Location

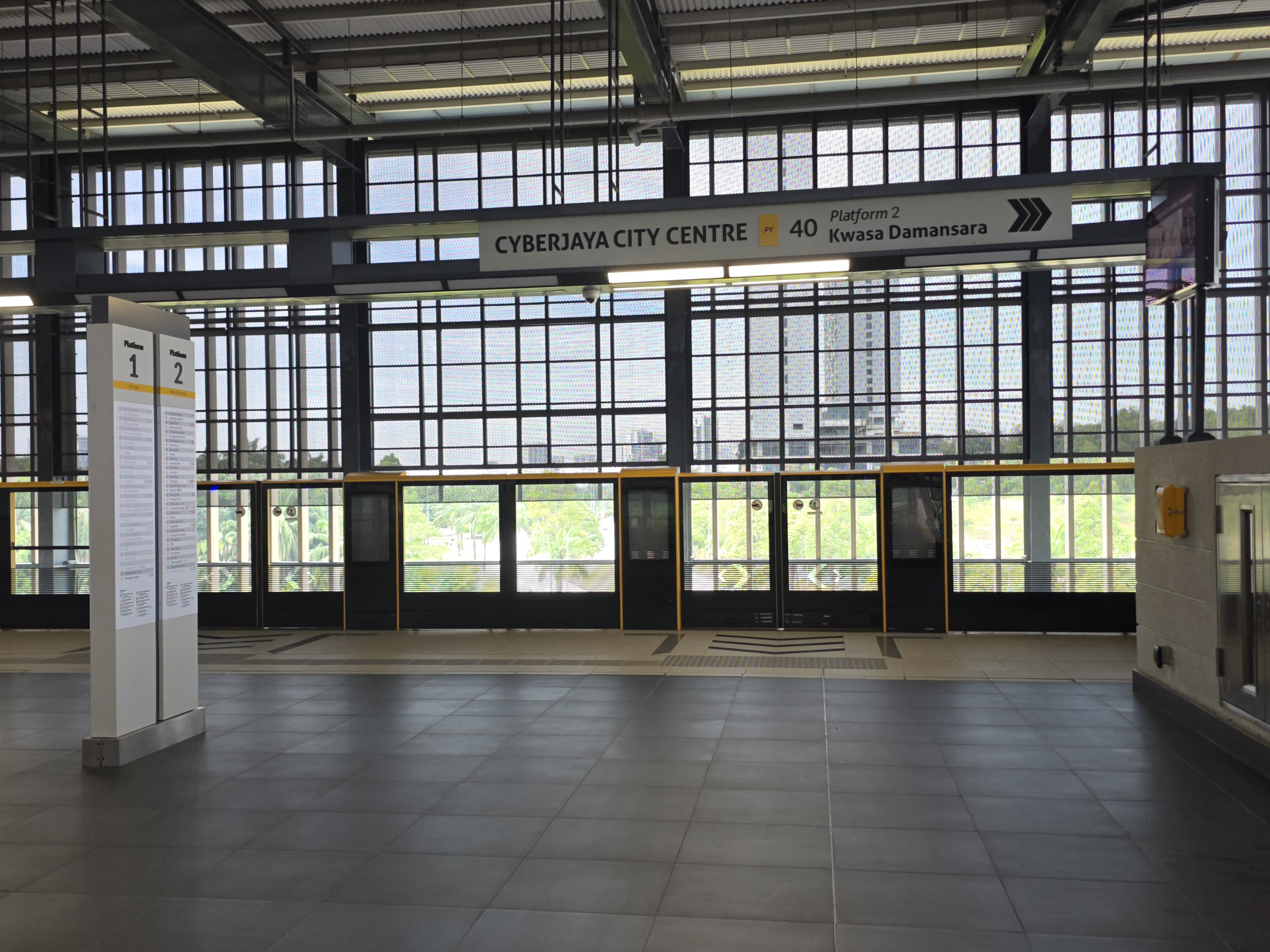
Cyberjaya City Centre MRT platform level

The Cyberjaya City Centre MRT station is a mass rapid transit (MRT) station. It is one of two train stations that serve the town of Cyberjaya, the other being Cyberjaya Utara. It is part of the MRT Putrajaya Line.

Under the station naming rights programme, the station was previously known as Cyberjaya City Centre-Limkokwing after the nearby Limkokwing University of Creative Technology.

== Location ==
Despite its name, the station is not located in Cyberjaya's central business district, but rather on its eastern boundary. This station is located near the Limkokwing University of Creative Technology, though access to the university is not possible via walking. Feeder buses, e-hailing or taxi are required to access the rest of Cyberjaya.

== Bus Services ==
=== Feeder buses ===
Route No.	Origin	Desitination	Via	Connecting to
T506	PY40 Cyberjaya City Centre	Cyber 10	Persiaran APEC; Persiaran Rimba Permai; Persiaran Sepang; Persiaran Laman View; Persiaran Sepang; Jalan Teknokrat 2; Limkokwing University of Creative Technology	T504 T505
T507	PY40 Cyberjaya City Centre	Cyberjaya Transport Terminal; Perdana Lakeview	Persiaran APEC; Jalan Teknokrat 6; Persiaran Multimedia; D'Pulze Mall; Lingkaran Cyber Point Timur; Persiaran Ceria; Jalan Cyber Point; Sekolah Seri Puteri; Persiaran Harmoni	T504 T505

== Passenger Statistics ==
In 2025, the station recorded an average of 21,857 monthly passengers (boarding passengers only).
