= Xiamen University Malaysia =

Private university in Sepang, Selangor, Malaysia

- 厦门大学马来西亚分校 (Chinese)
- Seal of Xiamen University
- Motto: 自强不息, 止于至善
- Motto in English: Pursue Excellence, Strive for Perfection
- Type: Research university
- Established: 2016
- Founders: Tan Kah Kee
- Accreditation: Government of Malaysia; Government of China; Ministry of Higher Education of Malaysia; Ministry of Education of China
- Affiliations: Project 985; Project 211; Double First-Class Construction; GU8
- Location: Sunsuria City, Sepang, Selangor, 43900, Malaysia; 2°49′58″N 101°42′10″E
- Campus: 150 acres; Urban
- Website: xmu.edu.my

Chinese name
- Simplified Chinese: 厦门大学马来西亚分校
- Traditional Chinese: 廈門大學馬來西亞分校
Transcriptions
Standard Mandarin
- Hanyu Pinyin: Xiàmén Dàxué Mǎláixīyà Fēnxiào
- Branch campus of the Xiamen University

Xiamen University Malaysia (abbreviated as XMUM) is an international branch campus of Xiamen University located in Sepang, Selangor, Malaysia. It is the first overseas campus set up by a Chinese public university, as well as the first Chinese university branch campus in Malaysia.

Xiamen University is a national public university located in Xiamen, Fujian, China. It is affiliated with and funded by the Ministry of Education of China. The university is part of Project 985, Project 211, and the Double First-Class Construction. Xiamen University accepted the invitation and offer from the Ministry of Higher Education of Malaysia, and established its Malaysia Campus in 2016.

XMUM is accredited by the Ministry of Higher Education of Malaysia and the Ministry of Education of China. XMUM ranked 1st in Malaysia for Nature Index Institution Research Output in 2025.

== History ==
In April 2012, the Malaysian government welcomed the Chinese government for Xiamen University to set up a campus in Malaysia.

On 21 January 2013, the Malaysian Minister of Higher Education officially handed a letter to invite XMU to set up a campus in Malaysia. On 4 October 2013, the agreement on providing all-round support for the construction of XMUM was signed.

On 13 November 2015, registration was approved by the Ministry of Higher Education of Malaysia.

On 23 November 2015, at the Malaysia-China High Level Economic Forum, Chinese Premier Li Keqiang said that the establishment of XMUM "not only demonstrates the depth of people-to-people exchange between China and Malaysia, but also the openness of the Malaysian government and its people".

On 3 December 2016, XMUM officially opened for enquiries as well as for receiving applications after announcing the launch of the university's student recruitment.

On 22 February 2016, XMUM officially opened.

== Rankings and reputation ==
University rankings

Global – Overall
- ARWU World: 101-150 (2025)
- QS World: 346 (2026)
- THE World: 251-300 (2025)
- USNWR Global: 189 (2026)

Regional – Overall
- QS Asia: 72 (2026)
- THE Asia: 67 (2025)
- USNWR Asia: 42 (2026)

Xiamen University Malaysia has been listed among China's leading universities on the national 211 Project since year 1995, 985 Project since year 2000, and selected into the national Double First-Class Construction since 2017, which have been launched by the Chinese government to support selected universities in achieving world-class standing.

All undergraduate programmes in Xiamen University Malaysia are Honours degree approved by Malaysian Ministry of Higher Education. All the programmes offered by Xiamen University Malaysia are recognised internationally, with dual accreditation by both the Malaysian government and Chinese government.

Xiamen University Malaysia ranked 1st in Malaysia for Nature Index Institution Research Output in 2025.

== Research ==
The construction of Malaysia's largest radio telescope is in progress in Jelebu, Negeri Sembilan. University Malaya was currently in collaboration with the Shanghai Astronomical Observatory, Chinese Academy of Sciences and Xiamen University Malaysia to build the telescope. Malaysia has moved forward in the signing of a Memorandum of Agreement with the Shanghai Astronomical Observatory (SHAO) and Xiamen University Malaysia (XMUM) for the acquisition and operation of a VGOS radio telescope which will be expected to start its construction in Jelebu in the near future.
