= List of schools in Kuala Lumpur =

This is a list of schools in Kuala Lumpur, Malaysia. It is categorised according to the variants of schools in Malaysia, and is arranged alphabetically.

== National Type Chinese Primary and Secondary Schools ==
=== Chinese Primary School ===
- Sekolah Jenis Kebangsaan (C) Chi Man
- Sekolah Jenis Kebangsaan (C) Chiao Nan
- Sekolah Jenis Kebangsaan (C) Chin Woo
- Sekolah Jenis Kebangsaan (C) Chong Fah Phit Chee
- Sekolah Jenis Kebangsaan (C) Chong Hwa
- Sekolah Jenis Kebangsaan (C) Choong Wen
- Sekolah Jenis Kebangsaan (C) Chung Hwa (P)
- Sekolah Jenis Kebangsaan (C) Chung Kwo
- Sekolah Jenis Kebangsaan (C) Chung Kwok
- Sekolah Jenis Kebangsaan (C) Confucian
- Sekolah Jenis Kebangsaan (C) Jalan Davidson
- Sekolah Jenis Kebangsaan (C) Jalan Imbi
- Sekolah Jenis Kebangsaan (C) Jinjang Selatan
- Sekolah Jenis Kebangsaan (C) Jinjang Tengah (1)
- Sekolah Jenis Kebangsaan (C) Jinjang Tengah (2)
- Sekolah Jenis Kebangsaan (C) Jinjang Utara
- Sekolah Jenis Kebangsaan (C) Kepong (1)
- Sekolah Jenis Kebangsaan (C) Kepong (2)
- Sekolah Jenis Kebangsaan (C) Khai Chee
- Sekolah Jenis Kebangsaan (C) Kuen Cheng (1)
- Sekolah Jenis Kebangsaan (C) Kuen Cheng (2)
- Sekolah Jenis Kebangsaan (C) Kung Min
- Sekolah Jenis Kebangsaan (C) Kwong Hon
- Sekolah Jenis Kebangsaan (C) La Salle
- Sekolah Jenis Kebangsaan (C) Lai Chee
- Sekolah Jenis Kebangsaan (C) Lai Meng
- Sekolah Jenis Kebangsaan (C) Mun Choong
- Sekolah Jenis Kebangsaan (C) Mun Yee
- Sekolah Jenis Kebangsaan (C) Naam Kheung
- Sekolah Jenis Kebangsaan (C) Nan Kai
- Sekolah Jenis Kebangsaan (C) Nan Yik (Lee Rubber)
- Sekolah Jenis Kebangsaan (C) Salak Selatan
- Sekolah Jenis Kebangsaan (C) Sam Yoke
- Sekolah Jenis Kebangsaan (C) Sentul
- Sekolah Jenis Kebangsaan (C) Sentul Pasar
- Sekolah Jenis Kebangsaan (C) St. Theresa
- Sekolah Jenis Kebangsaan (C) Tai Thung
- Sekolah Jenis Kebangsaan (C) Taman Connaught
- Sekolah Jenis Kebangsaan (C) Tsun Jin
- Sekolah Jenis Kebangsaan (C) Yoke Nam
- Sekolah Jenis Kebangsaan (C) Kepong (3)

=== Chinese Secondary School ===
- SMJK Chong Hwa 吉隆坡中华国民型华文中学
- SMJK Confucian 尊孔国民型华文中学

== Sekolah Kebangsaan-Government type primary and secondary school ==
=== Sekolah Rendah Kebangsaan ===
- Sekolah Kebangsaan Alam Damai
- Sekolah Kebangsaan Au Keramat
- Sekolah Kebangsaan Bandar Baru Sentul
- Sekolah Kebangsaan Bandar Baru Seri Petaling (1) (SKBBSP1)
- Sekolah Kebangsaan Bandar Baru Seri Petaling (2) (SKBBSP2)
- Sekolah Kebangsaan Bandar Tasik Selatan
- Sekolah Kebangsaan Bangsar
- Sekolah Kebangsaan Batu Empat(1) Jalan Ipoh
- Sekolah Kebangsaan Batu Empat(2) Jalan Ipoh
- Sekolah Kebangsaan Bukit Bandaraya, Bangsar
- Sekolah Kebangsaan Bukit Damansara
- Sekolah Kebangsaan Bukit Pantai
- Sekolah Kebangsaan Desa Pandan (SKDP)
- Sekolah Kebangsaan Kepong Baru
- Sekolah Kebangsaan Kiaramas
- Sekolah Kebangsaan Puteri Pandan 1
- Sekolah Kebangsaan Puteri Pandan 2
- Sekolah Kebangsaan Saint Gabriel (SKSG)
- Sekolah Kebangsaan Sentul 1
- Sekolah Kebangsaan Sentul 2
- Sekolah Kebangsaan Seri Anggerik
- SK Setapak Indah (formerly known as SK Seri Melati)
- Sekolah Kebangsaan Seri Bintang Selatan
- Sekolah Kebangsaan Seri Bintang Utara (SKSBU)
- Sekolah Kebangsaan Seri Mega
- Sekolah Kebangsaan Seri Setia
- Sekolah Kebangsaan Sungai Besi
- Sekolah Kebangsaan Segambut Makmur
- Sekolah Kebangsaan Segambut
- Sekolah Kebangsaan Taman Bukit Maluri, Kepong (SKTBM)
- Sekolah Kebangsaan Taman Kepong
- Sekolah Kebangsaan Taman Maluri (SKTM)
- Sekolah Kebangsaan Taman Midah (1) (SKTM 1)
- Sekolah Kebangsaan Taman Midah (2) (SKTM 2)
- Sekolah Kebangsaan Taman Segar, Jalan Manis, Cheras
- Sekolah Kebangsaan Taman Tun Dr. Ismail 1 (SKTTDI 1)
- Sekolah Kebangsaan Taman Tun Dr. Ismail 2 (SKTTDI 2)
- Sekolah Kebangsaan Lelaki Methodist, K.L.
- Sekolah Kebangsaan Lelaki Methodist, Sentul
- Sekolah Kebangsaan Wangsa Jaya, Setapak (SKWJ)
- SRA Taman Tun Dr. Ismail
- Sekolah Rendah Taman Ilmu dan Budi (Setia Budi)
- Sekolah Rendah Hibiscus

=== Secondary education: Sekolah Menengah Kebangsaan (SMK) ===
School Code	School name	Postcode	Area	Coordinates
WEA0255	Sekolah Bimbingan Jalinan Kasih	50300	Kuala Lumpur	3.1668°N 101.7002°E
WEB0219	SMK (L) Methodist	50150	Kuala Lumpur	3.1435°N 101.7010°E
WEB0220	SMK (L) Methodist Sentul	51000	Kuala Lumpur	3.1792°N 101.6940°E
WEB0208	SMK (P) Air Panas	53200	Kuala Lumpur	3.1911°N 101.7160°E
WEB0217	SMK (P) Bandaraya	55100	Kuala Lumpur	3.1407°N 101.7138°E
WEB0228	SMK (P) Jalan Ipoh	51200	Kuala Lumpur	3.1872°N 101.6810°E
WEB0225	SMK (P) Methodist	50480	Kuala Lumpur	3.1315°N 101.6900°E
WEB0221	SMK (P) Pudu	55200	Kuala Lumpur	3.1318°N 101.7149°E
WEA0252	SMK Alam Damai	56000	Kuala Lumpur	3.0587°N 101.7410°E
WEA0196	SMK Aminuddin Baki	55100	Kuala Lumpur	3.1401°N 101.7280°E
WEA0217	SMK Bandar Baru Sentul	51000	Kuala Lumpur	3.1840°N 101.6990°E
WEA0218	SMK Bandar Baru Seri Petaling	57000	Kuala Lumpur	3.0662°N 101.6880°E
WEA0233	SMK Bandar Tasik Selatan	57000	Kuala Lumpur	3.0727°N 101.7192°E
WEA0222	SMK Bandar Tun Razak	56000	Kuala Lumpur	3.0915°N 101.7240°E
WEB0256	SMK Bangsar	59000	Kuala Lumpur	3.1326°N 101.6765°E
WEA0234	SMK Batu Muda	51100	Kuala Lumpur	3.2108°N 101.6890°E
WEA0213	SMK Bukit Bandaraya	59000	Kuala Lumpur	3.1428°N 101.6720°E
WEA0239	SMK Bukit Jalil	57000	Kuala Lumpur	3.0507°N 101.6860°E
WEB0210	SMK Cheras	56000	Kuala Lumpur	3.1093°N 101.7270°E
WEB0211	SMK Cochrane	55100	Kuala Lumpur	3.1311°N 101.7260°E
WEA0251	SMK Cochrane Perkasa	55100	Kuala Lumpur	3.1348°N 101.7249°E
WEB0213	SMK Convent Bukit Nanas	50250	Kuala Lumpur	3.1530°N 101.7015°E
WEB0214	SMK Convent Jalan Peel	55100	Kuala Lumpur	3.1313°N 101.7210°E
WEB0215	SMK Convent Sentul	51000	Kuala Lumpur	3.1866°N 101.6910°E
WEA0242	SMK Danau Kota	53300	Kuala Lumpur	3.2018°N 101.7140°E
WEA0231	SMK Dato' Ibrahim Yaacob	51200	Kuala Lumpur	3.2068°N 101.6728°E
WEB0231	SMK Dato' Onn	55200	Kuala Lumpur	3.1338°N 101.7100°E
WEB0227	SMK Datok Lokman	55100	Kuala Lumpur	3.1394°N 101.7290°E
WEA0223	SMK Desa Perdana	58100	Kuala Lumpur	3.1062°N 101.6907°E
WEA0240	SMK Desa Petaling	57100	Kuala Lumpur	3.0819°N 101.7122°E
WEA0226	SMK Desa Tun Hussein Onn	54200	Kuala Lumpur	3.1846°N 101.7350°E
WEB0243	SMK Dharma	58200	Kuala Lumpur	3.0753°N 101.6627°E
WEB0249	SMK Jinjang	52000	Kuala Lumpur	3.2226°N 101.6550°E
WEA0208	SMK Kepong Baru	52100	Kuala Lumpur	3.1978°N 101.6470°E
WEA0259	SMK Keramat Wangsa	54200	Kuala Lumpur	3.1801°N 101.7521°E
WEA0249	SMK Kiaramas	50480	Kuala Lumpur	3.1787°N 101.6630°E
WEB0236	SMK La Salle Brickfields	50470	Kuala Lumpur	3.1277°N 101.6850°E
WEB0238	SMK La Salle Sentul	51000	Kuala Lumpur	3.1801°N 101.6919°E
WEB0218	SMK Maxwell	50480	Kuala Lumpur	3.1711°N 101.6913°E
WEA0227	SMK Menjalara	52100	Kuala Lumpur	3.1935°N 101.6363°E
WEA0238	SMK Miharja	55200	Kuala Lumpur	3.1215°N 101.7217°E
WEA0257	SMK Orkid Desa	56000	Cheras	3.0772°N 101.7367°E
WEA0199	SMK Padang Tembak	54100	Kuala Lumpur	3.1802°N 101.7238°E
WEA0201	SMK Petaling	58200	Kuala Lumpur	3.0807°N 101.6602°E
WEB0207	SMK Puteri Ampang	55000	Kuala Lumpur	3.1625°N 101.7290°E
WEB0234	SMK Puteri Titiwangsa	53200	Kuala Lumpur	3.1737°N 101.7070°E
WEA0197	SMK Puteri Wilayah	50300	Kuala Lumpur	3.1619°N 101.7007°E
WEB0248	SMK Raja Abdullah	52000	Kuala Lumpur	3.2025°N 101.6670°E
WEA0202	SMK Raja Ali	51200	Kuala Lumpur	3.1996°N 101.6746°E
WEA0243	SMK Segambut	51200	Kuala Lumpur	3.1871°N 101.6680°E
WEA0228	SMK Segambut Jaya	51200	Kuala Lumpur	3.1855°N 101.6530°E
WEA0225	SMK Seksyen 5 Wangsa Maju	53300	Kuala Lumpur	3.1978°N 101.7470°E
WEA0253	SMK Sentul Utama	51200	Kuala Lumpur	3.1756°N 101.6910°E
WEB0206	SMK Seri Ampang	55000	Kuala Lumpur	3.1627°N 101.7300°E
WEA0241	SMK Seri Bintang Selatan	56100	Kuala Lumpur	3.1190°N 101.7350°E
WEB0209	SMK Seri Bintang Utara	56100	Kuala Lumpur	3.1210°N 101.7346°E
WEA0220	SMK Seri Hartamas	50480	Kuala Lumpur	3.1575°N 101.6470°E
WEA0244	SMK Seri Mulia	56000	Kuala Lumpur	3.0935°N 101.7140°E
WEA0250	SMK Seri Mutiara	56000	Kuala Lumpur	3.0886°N 101.7310°E
WEB0229	SMK Seri Pantai	59200	Kuala Lumpur	3.1125°N 101.6640°E
WEA0246	SMK Seri Permaisuri	56000	Kuala Lumpur	3.1073°N 101.7175°E
WEA0237	SMK Seri Saujana	57000	Kuala Lumpur	3.0680°N 101.6841°E
WEB0230	SMK Seri Sentosa	58200	Kuala Lumpur	3.0930°N 101.6820°E
WEA0245	SMK Seri Tasik	56000	Kuala Lumpur	3.0972°N 101.7116°E
WEB0233	SMK Seri Titiwangsa	53200	Kuala Lumpur	3.1740°N 101.7066°E
WEA0235	SMK Setapak Indah	53100	Kuala Lumpur	3.2168°N 101.7210°E
WEA0236	SMK Sinar Bintang	52100	Kuala Lumpur	3.1887°N 101.6450°E
WEB0222	SMK St. Gabriel	55100	Kuala Lumpur	3.1357°N 101.7295°E
WEB0224	SMK St. Mary	52100	Kuala Lumpur	3.2304°N 101.6490°E
WEA0195	SMK Sungai Besi	57000	Kuala Lumpur	3.0665°N 101.7150°E
WEA0194	SMK Taman Bukit Maluri	52100	Kuala Lumpur	3.2025°N 101.6340°E
WEA0216	SMK Taman Connaught	56000	Kuala Lumpur	3.0835°N 101.7360°E
WEA0212	SMK Taman Desa	58100	Kuala Lumpur	3.1028°N 101.6870°E
WEB0232	SMK Taman Maluri	55100	Kuala Lumpur	3.1409°N 101.7300°E
WEA0224	SMK Taman Melati	53100	Kuala Lumpur	3.2226°N 101.7280°E
WEA0221	SMK Taman Seri Rampai	53300	Kuala Lumpur	3.1919°N 101.7320°E
WEA0232	SMK Taman Setiawangsa	54200	Kuala Lumpur	3.1841°N 101.7470°E
WEA0210	SMK Taman Tun Dr. Ismail	60000	Kuala Lumpur	3.1468°N 101.6240°E
WEA0219	SMK Taman Yarl	58200	Kuala Lumpur	3.0675°N 101.6670°E
WEA0260	SMK Tiara Permai	51200	Kuala Lumpur	3.2094°N 101.6740°E
WEB0216	SMK Tinggi Setapak (Setapak High School)	53200	Kuala Lumpur	3.1863°N 101.7163°E
WEB0235	SMK Vivekananda	50470	Kuala Lumpur	3.1299°N 101.6862°E
WEA0214	SMK Wangsa Maju Seksyen 2	53300	Kuala Lumpur	3.2080°N 101.7350°E
WEA0229	SMK Wangsa Melawati	53300	Kuala Lumpur	3.2137°N 101.7410°E
WEB0237	SMK Yaacob Latif	55100	Kuala Lumpur	3.1280°N 101.7260°E
WEA0215	SMK Zon R1 Wangsa Maju	53300	Kuala Lumpur	3.2004°N 101.7310°E
WEB0223	St. John's Institution	50250	Kuala Lumpur	3.1511°N 101.7000°E
WEB0226	Victoria Institution	55200	Kuala Lumpur	3.1396°N 101.7030°E

== Private schools ==
=== Chinese Independent High School ===
- Confucian Private Secondary School
- Chong Hwa Independent High School
- Kuen Cheng High School
- Tsun Jin High School

=== International schools ===
- Alice Smith International School - Primary Campus is in Kuala Lumpur while the secondary campus is in Selangor.
- Cempaka International Ladies' College (CILC)
- Cempaka International School Cheras (CIS)
- Cempaka International School Damansara Heights
- Sekolah Menengah Kebangsaan Convent Sentul (known as SMKCS or CS)
- EtonHouse International School Malaysia
- elc International school
- Epsom College in Malaysia [ECIM] International School
- Fairview International School
- French School of Kuala Lumpur Henri Fauconnier (LFKL)
- Garden International School (GIS)
- Global Indian International School (Kuala Lumpur)
- Hi-5 House of Learning Preschool, Kuala Lumpur
- Hibiscus International School
- IGB International School (IGBIS)
- International Islamic School
- Itqan Integrated School (ITQAN)
- International School of Kuala Lumpur (ISKL)
- International School, Kota Damansara]
- Marefat International School
- Matrix International School
- Methodist Boys' School (Kuala Lumpur)
- Mont Kiara International School
- Mutiara International Grammar School
- Nexus International School Malaysia
- Real International School (Kuala Lumpur)
- Regent International School, Klang
- Regent International School, Kuantan
- Regent International School, Puchong
- Regent International School, Sungai Petani
- Rocklin International School, Kuala Lumpur
- Royal Military College, Kuala Lumpur
- Sayfol International School
- Sekolah Seri Suria
- Spectrum International School (SIS)
- Sekolah Sri Bestari, Bandar Sri Damansara, Kuala Lumpur
- Sri Dasmesh International School (SDIS)
- Sri Kuala Lumpur
- Sri Sempurna International School
- Stella Maris International School, Damansara
- St. John's International School
- St Joseph Institution International Malaysia
- Tanarata International Schools
- Taylor's International School
- Time International School
- Utama International School (UIS)
- UCSI International School
- Victoria International School (VIS), Banting
- Wesley Methodist School Kuala Lumpur (International) (WMSKL(I))

Note that the following are in Selangor and not in Kuala Lumpur proper:

- Australian International School, Malaysia
- British School, Kuala Lumpur

==== Expatriate schools (school code) ====
- DARUL HIKMAH IRAQI SCHOOL BVSH002
- IRAQI EXPATRIATE SCHOOL BVSD003
- Saudi Schools in Kuala Lumpur (Arabic: المدارس السعودية كوالالمبور, Malay: SEKOLAH EKSPATRIAT SAUDI) BVSD002
- French School of Kuala Lumpur (Lycée français de Kuala Lumpur) WVS0002
- French School of Kuala Lumpur HEVEA WVS0006
- SEKOLAH EKSPATRIAT IRAN (IRAN EXPATRIATE SCHOOL) WVS0004
- SEKOLAH EKSPATRIAT IRAN, KUALA LUMPUR WVS0007
- Sekolah Indonesia Kuala Lumpur WVS0003
- THE LIBYAN EXPATRIATE SCHOOL WVS0005

Note that several expatriate schools are in Selangor and not in Kuala Lumpur proper:

- Chinese Taipei School Kuala Lumpur (BVSA001)
- German School Kuala Lumpur (BVSJ001)
- Japanese School of Kuala Lumpur (BVSH001)
- Korean School of Malaysia (BVSI001)
