= Fauconnier =

Fauconnier is a surname. Notable people with the name include:

- Alain Fauconnier (born 1945), French politician, member of the Senate of France
- Geneviève Fauconnier (1886–1969), French novelist
- Gilles Fauconnier (1944–2021), French linguist, researcher in cognitive science, author
- Henri Fauconnier (1879–1973), French writer
- Henri Le Fauconnier (1881–1946), French Cubist painter
- Louis Fauconnier (1915–1994), Belgian modern pentathlete
- Olivier Fauconnier (born 1976), Guadeloupean former footballer

== See also ==
- Grand fauconnier de France, a position in the King's Household in France from the Middle Ages to the French Revolution
- Fauconnier Patent, royal land patent granted in 1705 in Dutchess County, province of New York
- Lycee francais de Kuala Lumpur Henri Fauconnier, French international school in Kuala Lumpur, Malaysia
