= Cyberjaya =

Town in Sepang, Selangor, Malaysia

Coordinates: 2°55′21″N 101°39′18″E

- City
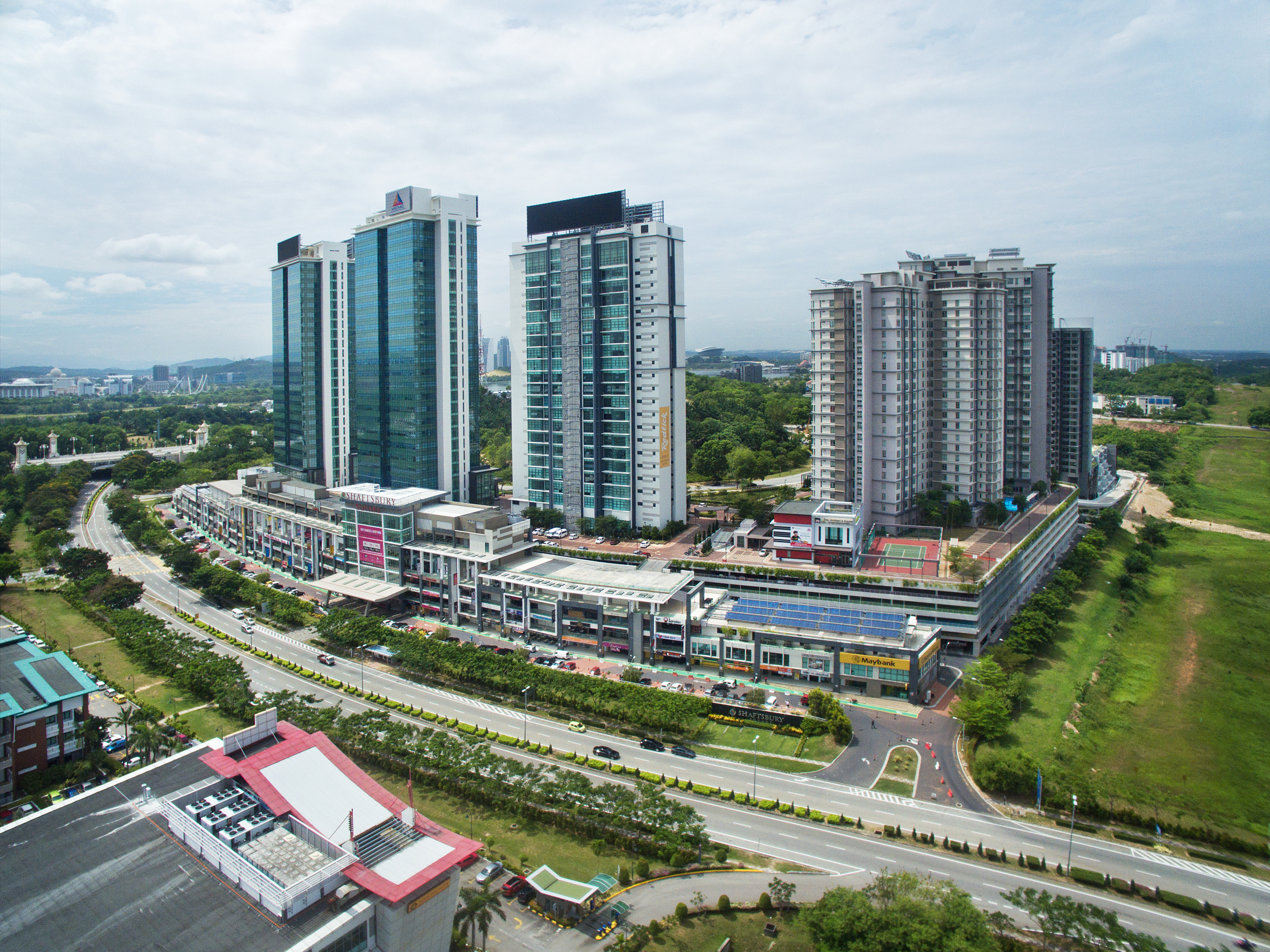
- Interactive map of Cyberjaya
- Country: Malaysia
- State: Selangor
- District: Sepang
- Establishment: 17 May 1997

Area
  - Total: 28.94 km^{2} (11.17 sq mi)

Population (2020)
  - Total: 49,276
  - Density: 1,703/km^{2} (4,410/sq mi)
- Time zone: UTC+8 (MST)
  - Summer (DST): N/A
- Postcode: 63xxx, 64xxx, 43xxx
- Calling code: +60-383, +60-386, +60-388
- Website: cyberjayamalaysia.com.my mpsepang.gov.my

Cyberjaya (a portmanteau of cyber and Putrajaya) is a planned city with a science park as its core that forms part of Greater Kuala Lumpur, in Malaysia. It is located in Sepang District, Selangor. Cyberjaya is adjacent to and developed along with Putrajaya, Malaysia's government seat. The city aspires to be known as the Silicon Valley of Malaysia.

The official opening ceremony for Cyberjaya was held on 17 May 1997 by then-Prime Minister, Mahathir Mohamad.

Many multinational companies and data centres are located in the city.

== History ==
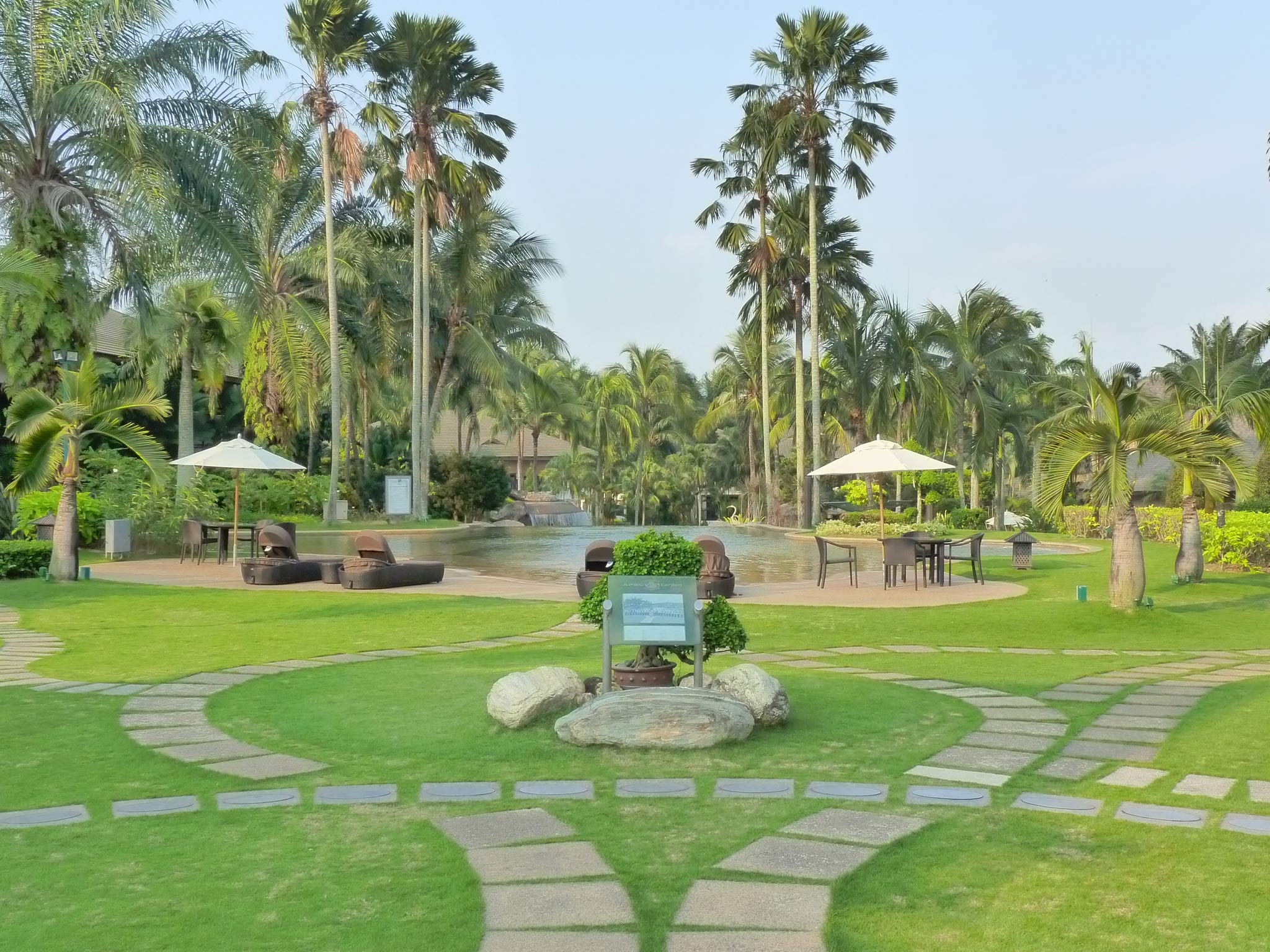
Cyberview Lodge, the first hotel in Cyberjaya, hosted the 1998 Asia-Pacific Economic Cooperation meeting.

Until 1975, Cyberjaya, along with Putrajaya and Dengkil were under the administration of Hulu Langat district. On the site of today's Cyberjaya once stood an estate, Prang Besar (Great War).

The idea of an IT-themed city, Cyberjaya, arose out of a study by management consultancy McKinsey for the Multimedia Super Corridor commissioned by the Federal Government of Malaysia in 1995. The implementation agency was the Town & Country Planning Department of the Ministry of Housing and Local Government. The catalyst was the agreement by NTT in 1996 to site an R&D centre at a site to the west of the new Malaysian administration centre, Putrajaya.

Multimedia Development Corporation (MDEC, then known as MDC), the agency overseeing the implementation of the MSC was located in Cyberjaya to oversee the creation. The real estate implementation was privatised to Cyberview Sdn Bhd (Cyberview) in early 1997. At the time, Cyberview was set up a joint-venture comprising entities such as Setia Haruman Sdn Bhd (SHSB), Nippon Telephone and Telegraph (NTT), Golden Hope, MDEC, Permodalan Nasional Berhad (PNB) and Kumpulan Darul Ehsan Berhad (KDEB), representative of the Selangor Government. SHSB, a consortium comprising Renong, Landmarks, MKLand and Country Heights, was asked to take the lead regarding the development. Federal government-linked companies Telekom Malaysia and Tenaga Nasional were conscripted to provide the telecommunication and power supply infrastructure. The ambitious plan was to develop the first phase, comprising 1,430 hectares by 2006, with the remaining 1,460 hectares to be developed after the year 2011. The engineering management consultant, Pengurusan Lebuhraya Bhd (now acquired by Opus International Malaysia) was appointed to manage the construction of utilities and infrastructure, overseeing major construction firms of Peremba and United Engineers Malaysia (UEM).

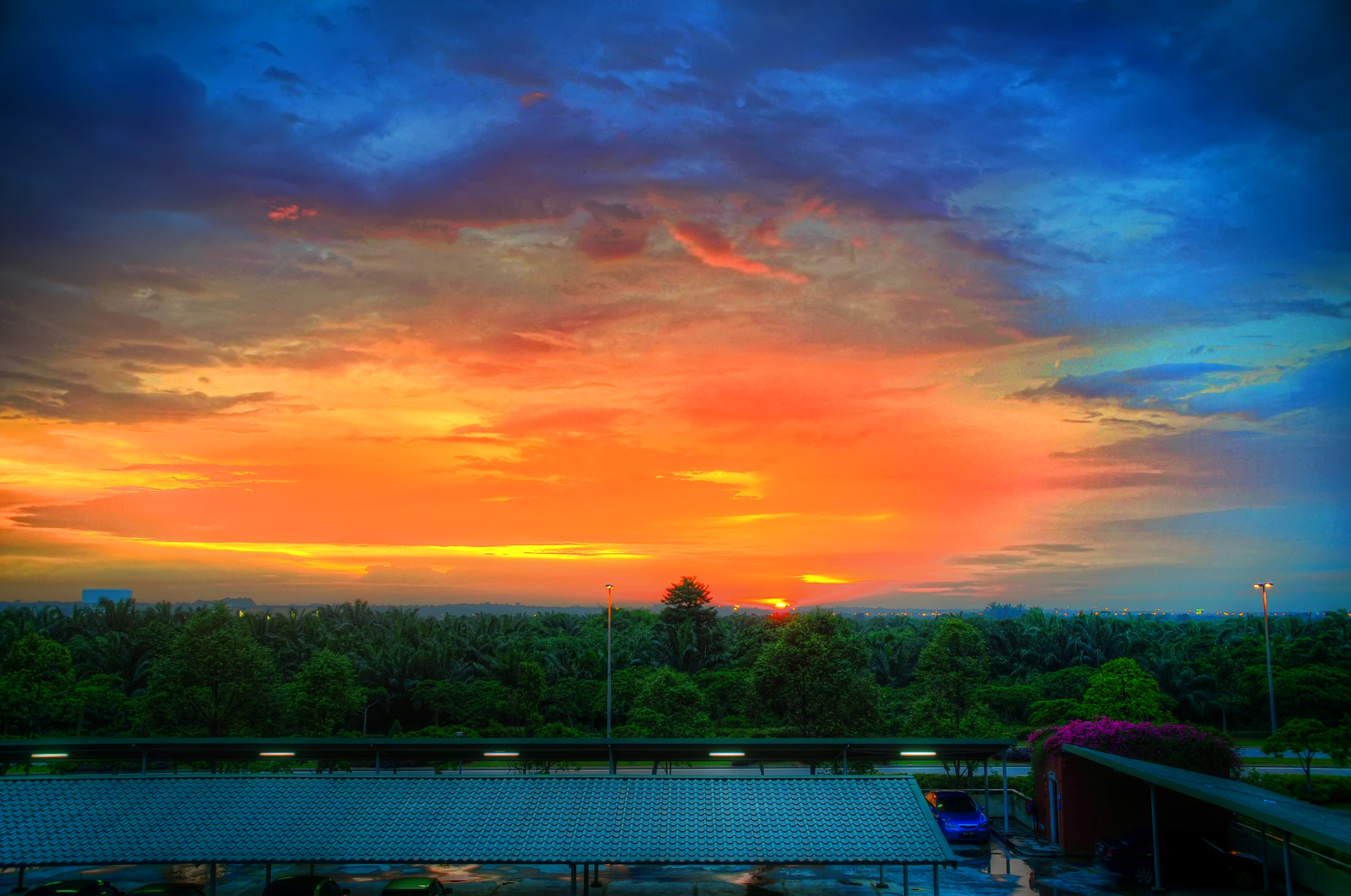
Sunset over Cyberjaya (2010)

However, due to the late 1997 Asian financial crisis, the undertaking was deemed no longer viable and necessitated the Government taking over of the 55 percent and 15 percent stake in Cyberview shares held by SHSB and NTT respectively via the Ministry of Finance Inc. (MOF Inc.). The transaction gave MOF Inc a 70 percent stake, and Cyberview has remained a government-owned company ever since. Cyberview then entered into an agreement with SHSB with shareholders comprising Country Heights Holdings Berhad (CHHB), Landmarks, Menara Embun (an MKLand Controlled Company) and Renong (now UEM World) with equal shares of 25 percent; granting SHSB the right to develop Cyberjaya as the master developer, while Cyberview became the landowner. In 2004, CHHB and Landmarks sold their equity interest in SHSB to MKLand-controlled companies, namely Modern Eden (12.5%), Impressive Circuits (12.5%) and Virtual Path (25%), resulting in MKLand-controlled companies becoming the majority shareholder of SHSB.

Cyberview's role grew to include implementing various development and government initiatives, while SHSB carried on its role as the master developer. In addition to this, Cyberview was also tasked to undertake citywide maintenance and spearhead investor interface and community-centric programmes in Cyberjaya.

In August 2008, Cyberjaya was awarded the "Best Brand in National ICT Hub" under the Corporate Branding category at the BrandLaureate Award 2007–2008.

== Physical development ==
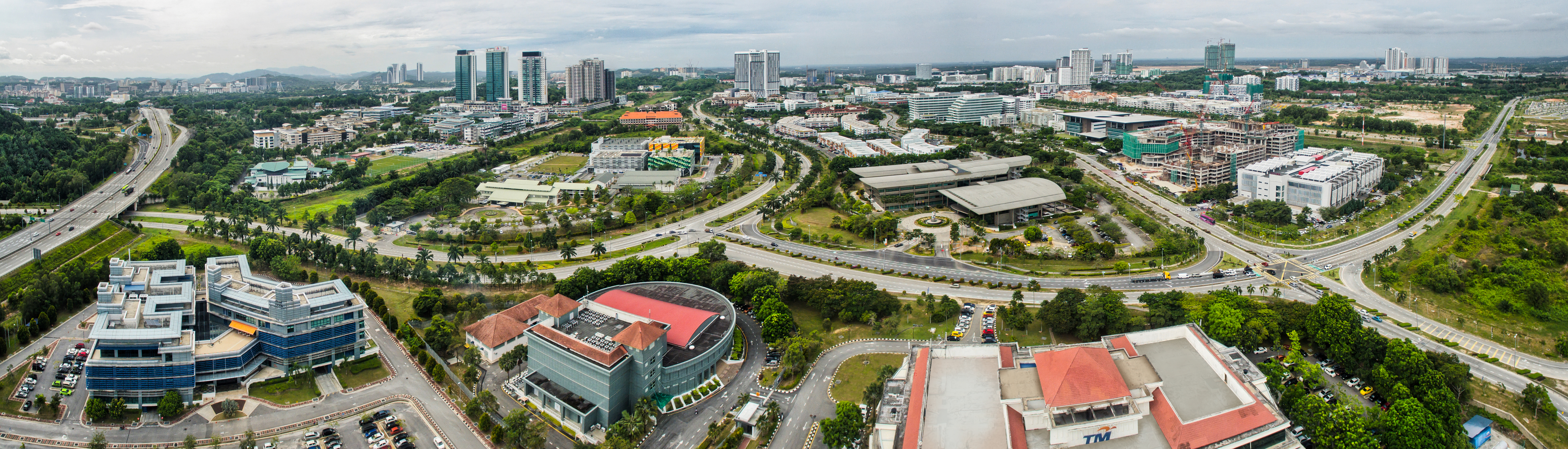
Cyberjaya Aerial Shot

Spanning about 28.94 square kilometres (7,000 acres), the city is the nucleus of the Multimedia Super Corridor (MSC), until 2022 known as MSC Malaysia, since then rebranded into Malaysia Digital (MD). The site for Cyberjaya was primarily undeveloped land consisting of oil palm plantations. It has since seen extensive building activities, including a boutique hotel, numerous commercial buildings, offices for MSC (now "MD") Status companies, universities, a community club, and the local council's headquarters.

It was built as a future city, but no goals toward this end have been announced. The Malaysia Digital Economy Corporation (MDEC, formerly Multimedia Development Corporation - MDC), the agency tasked with spearheading the MSC's progress, has its headquarters in the heart of Cyberjaya.

Setia Haruman installs properties such as office buildings, retail space and apartment suites to meet the market's demand. Setia Haruman is a property developer and has constructed commercial, residential and enterprise buildings to meet the community's demands in Cyberjaya.

=== Office and commercial facilities ===
Many companies that qualify for MSC incentives have relocated their IT support operations to Cyberjaya. These include TM, Deriv, Huawei, T-Systems, Dell, DHL, Tech Mahindra, Wipro, and BMW.

=== Public facilities ===
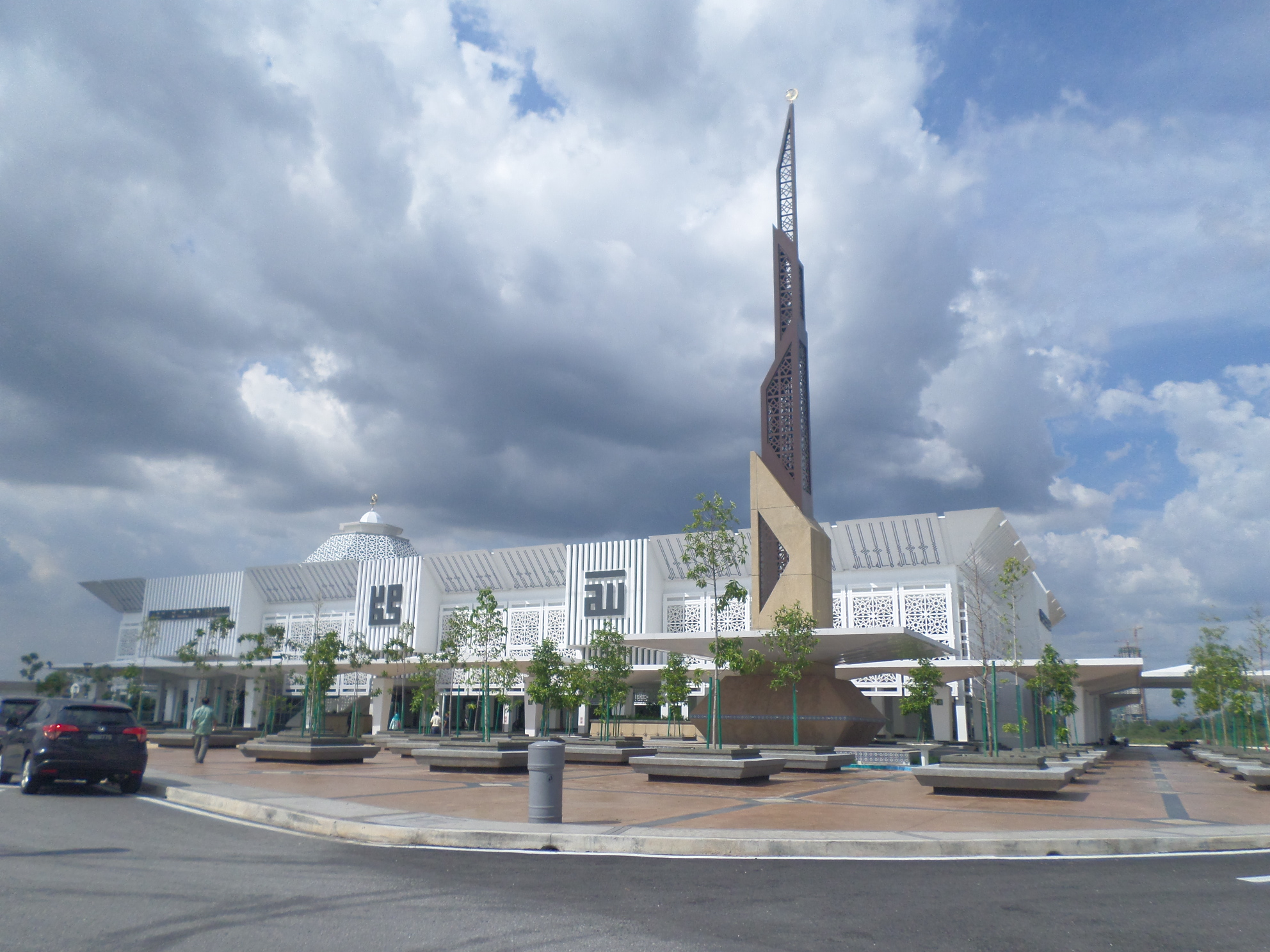
Mosque in Cyberjaya

As an emerging township, Cyberjaya has a police station complex, a fire station (Bomba), and a hospital (Hospital Cyberjaya). Apart from that, other public amenities includes a small recreational park just next to Multimedia University, the Cyberjaya Community Club, the Sports Arena (which offers outdoor sports facilities), bus shelters, pedestrian walkways and signalised pedestrian crossing at road junctions.

The Raja Haji Fisabilillah Mosque is the principal mosque in Cyberjaya. A second public mosque, Cyber 10 Mosque, opened in April 2018

=== Recreation facilities ===
==== Parks ====
The Cyberjaya Lake Gardens is a 400-acre (1.6 km^{2}) 'green lung' for Cyberjaya. Presently, about 86 acres (35 ha) of the land has been developed with facilities including visitor's information centre, boardwalk, look-out tower, children's playground, cat park, 15 acres (6.1 ha) of main lake and 29 acres (12 ha) of natural and wetland. Another recreational lake garden is situated along Persiaran Sepang which is equipped with a children's playground and a jogging trek.

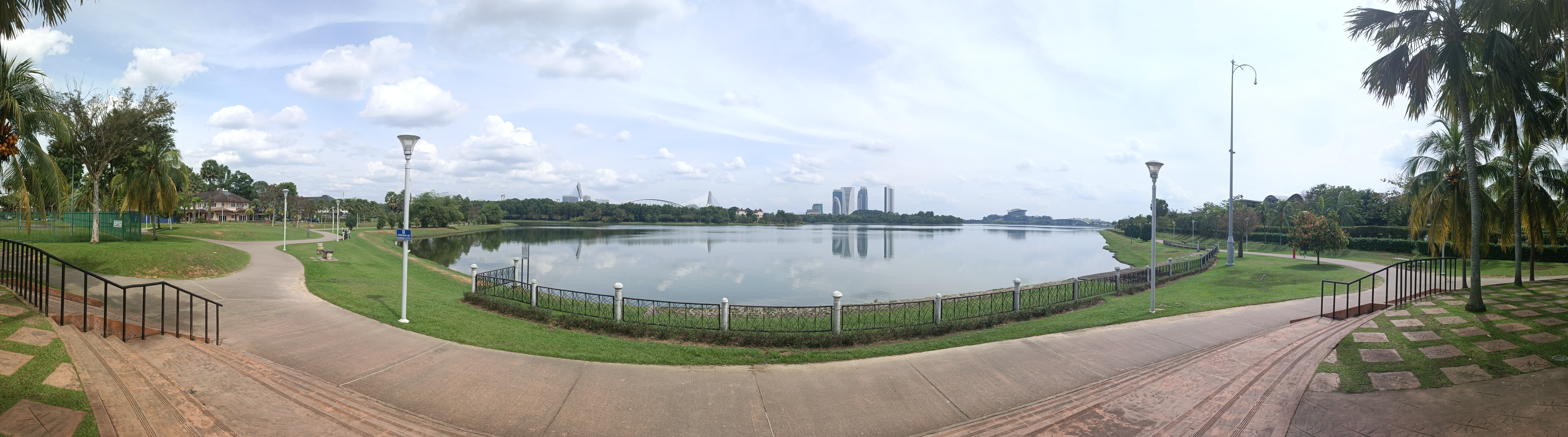
Panorama of Putrajaya from Precinct 7 Promenade in December 2022.

Other outdoor recreational facilities include the mini-park, adjacent to the Multimedia University; the 3.5 km promenade area next to the Putrajaya Lake; and the Sports Arena which offers more than 360 free parking bays, 1 basketball court, 1 tennis court, 2 futsal courts, a football field and a small food court.

For indoor recreational facilities, the Cyberjaya Community Club, developed by Cyberview, has 2 futsal courts, 2 badminton courts, a gymnasium and 2 squash courts; all indoor and outdoor recreational facilities including basketball court, 2 tennis courts, swimming pool, a go-kart circuit and golf driving range.

== Transport ==
=== Roads and highways ===
- North–South Expressway Central Link (Putrajaya Link) connects Cyberjaya with the main North–South Expressway Southern Route through Putrajaya interchange. Also connects Cyberjaya with Kuala Lumpur through Maju Expressway (MEX) Putrajaya interchange
- FT 29 Putrajaya–Cyberjaya Expressway connects Cyberjaya with Putrajaya and the rest of Sepang district. Also connects to South Klang Valley Expressway (SKVE) and Damansara–Puchong Expressway (LDP)

=== Public transport ===
==== Railways ====
RapidKL 12 MRT Putrajaya Line: Cyberjaya Utara - Cyberjaya City Centre

ERL 7 KLIA Transit: Putrajaya & Cyberjaya - while the station is actually located in Putrajaya, the official station name still includes Cyberjaya.

==== Bus ====
Feeder bus services operated by Rapid KL run four routes in Cyberjaya:

- T504 - from Cyberjaya Utara station to Cyber 11
- T505 - from Cyberjaya Utara station to Taman Pinggiran Cyber
- T506 - from Cyberjaya City Centre station to Cyber 10
- T507 - from Cyberjaya City Centre station to Cyberjaya Transport Terminal

A microtransit service known as Rapid On-Demand is also available since June 2025 to complement the existing feeder bus system.

Defunct bus service:

- 503 Causeway Link - from Putrajaya Sentral to Putra Perdana via Cyberjaya
- 520 Nadi Putra - from Putrajaya Sentral to Cyberjaya (terminated)
- Dedicated Transportation Service DTS - shuttle bus service operating from Cyberjaya Transport Terminal to other locations within Klang Valley but has ceased operations since September 2021
- SPG3 Smart Selangor - free bus service between Cyberjaya, Bandar Baru Salak Tinggi and Dengkil which ceased operations on 31 March 2025

==== Bicycles and mobility scooters ====
Bicycle and scooter sharing service is offered by Tryke to solve last-mile commute within the city. Hybrid bicycles and e-scooters are available for rental through smart phone application from several locations throughout the city, enabling connections from residential areas to offices, commercial centres, and parks.

== Population ==
The day-time population in Cyberjaya is about 140,000 and is expected to increase to 350,000 by 2039.

=== Residential areas ===
High rise residential and integrated developments include Cristal Serin Residence, Lakefront Residence, Shaftsbury Square, D'Pulze, Serin Residency, Cybersquare, Crystal, The Place, Pangea, Arc, D'Melor, Domain, Cyberia smart homes, Masreca19, etc. Landed housing includes Sejati Residences, Symphony Hills, Garden Residence, Summer Glades, Mirage by the Lake, Taman Pinggiran Cyber and Setia Eco Glades. With the many upcoming developments, there will be at least an additional 10,000 residential units in the next two years. Its perceived Garden Residence, Cyberjaya, is the most strategic landed properties in Cyberjaya due to its proximity to SkyPark, IOI Resort City Mall and the two MRT line 2 stations in the vicinity.

== Infrastructure ==
=== Communications ===
To support the aspiration to host multimedia industries, Cyberjaya was specified with extensive and intensive fibre optic cabling. As Malaysia's premier IT hub, Cyberjaya has a telecommunication backbone running primarily on fibre optics known as Cyberjaya Metro Fibre Network (CMFN). Operated by Allo Technology Sdn Bhd (formerly known as Setia Haruman Technology Sdn Bhd). CMFN is a carrier-neutral and open-access infrastructure where multi-leading Telco/Carriers/ISPs are riding on CMFN's fibre optic network to provide their services to end customers in Cyberjaya. CMFN delivers fibre connectivity straight to the building under the concepts of "Fibre-To-The-Building (FTTB)" and "Fibre-To-The-Home (FTTH)". As such, most of the commercial buildings and offices are connected to CMFN. With the ring topology; CMFN offers full redundancy throughout the network – with the availability of high capacity and resiliency network, many data centres are located here and connected to CMFN. However, some older commercial and residential units still use copper lines to provide "last mile" access to customers. Broadband access covering wireless and fixed-line is readily available. Broadband access is serviced primarily by Cyberjaya Broadband (City Broadband), Time, TMnet, NTT MSC.

=== Backup electrical supply ===
The Cyberjaya planning guidelines strongly required two electrical connections from two separate substations. Diesel generators up to full load (except air conditioning load) were specified to be installed in all commercial buildings. The electricity grid connection was also organised to enable "power islanding" and supported by the Serdang Power Station. The electricity service standard is set at 99.99% availability with a maximum of 10 seconds interruption for office and commercial areas and maximum 15 minutes interruption for residential areas. These measures were dreamed up to provide Cyberjaya with a comparative advantage against other Multimedia Super Corridor areas. However, Tenaga Nasional has extended the same standard to all urban areas connected to the National Grid in Malaysia.

=== District cooling ===
The use of district cooling system, where chilled water from a central plant is provided to run the air conditioning, was laid extensively in the central district. The promise is the economical use of off-peak electricity at night to chill water for air conditioning use during the day. Pendinginan Megajana Sdn Bhd, a subsidiary of Cyberview, is the provider for this service.

=== Data centres ===
Several data centres operate in Cyberjaya. Notable are those operated by T-Systems for Shell, NTT MSC, BMW and DHL. A small scale Data Centre ideal for Small & Medium Enterprises (SMEs) is located at City Command Center Cyberjaya (CCC) Data Centre that provides Rack Location Unit (RLU) space rental and server co-location. There are also carrier-neutral, purpose-built high-end data centre facilities in Cyberjaya such as CX1, CX2 and CX5 – managed by CSF Advisers (a CSF Group member) plc CSF Group), Basis Bay and MyTelehaus. There are also few government agencies' purpose-built data centre facilities in Cyberjaya, such as Central Bank (Bank Negara Malaysia) and the Road Transport Department. Malaysia's incumbent Telco, Telekom Malaysia (TM) also has its purpose-built data centre facilities in Cyberjaya.

=== Call centres ===
Several call centres & service desk operate in Cyberjaya. Notables are those operated by HP, IBM, HSBC.

=== Office space ===
Initially, 8 blocks of office buildings were built by the developer. These are purpose-built for multimedia companies by being provided extra height ceiling and underfloor trunking (some with raised floor), fibre optic wiring, dual redundant power supply, uninterruptible power supply and back up generators for whole electricity load, which common practice in Malaysia is only to 30% load.

Presently, there are more than 30 completed office buildings in Cyberjaya catering for multi-tenants and single tenants. Government agencies' presence will also increase once the Bank Negara Data Centre and Road and Transport Department's IT Centre buildings are completed.

This city is also looking forward to developing the Knowledge Workers Development Institute (KWDI) and the Creative Multimedia Cluster, both by Cyberview, which are targeted for completion in 2009.

MKN Embassy Techzone, is a freehold ICT business park project on approximately 41 acres (17 ha) of prime Cyberjaya land in the flagship zone lease to multinational companies. MKN Embassy Development Sdn develops the project. Bhd., a joint venture company between EMKAY Group of Malaysia and Embassy Group of India, is a strategic partner for the EMKAY group in developing this specialised ICT building.

=== Government offices ===
Cyberjaya hosts a number of federal and local government agencies head offices and branches:

- Malaysian Qualifications Agency (MQA) - Jalan Teknokrat 7, Cyber 5
- Malaysian Communications and Multimedia Commission (MCMC) - MCMC Tower 1, Jalan Impact, Cyber 6
- Lembaga Hasil Dalam Negeri (LHDN) - Persiaran Rimba Permai, Cyber 8
- Malaysian Public Service Department (JPA), Kumpulan Wang Persaraan - MKN Embassy Techzone, Jalan Teknokrat 2, Cyber 4
- Ministry of Education, Education Sponsorship Department - Jalan Usahawan 1, Cyber 6
- Ministry of Education, Fully Residential School Management Division, Jalan Usahawan 1, Cyber 6
- Ministry of Human Resource, Jabatan Tenaga Kerja - Jalan Teknokrat 3, Cyber 4
- Sepang Municipal Council (MPS) - Persiaran Semarak Api, Cyber 1

== Education ==
=== Colleges and universities ===
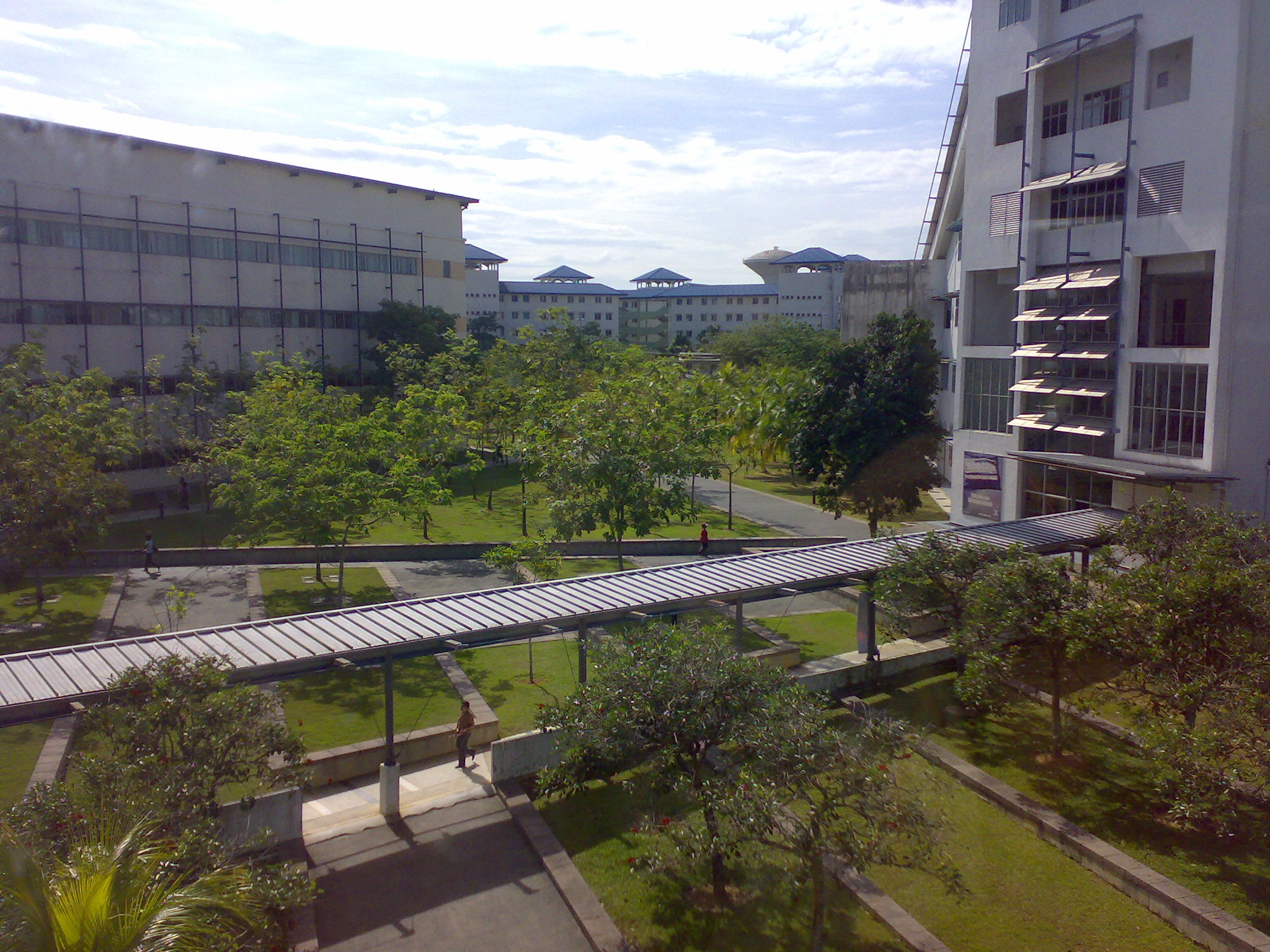
Multimedia University campus

- Multimedia University
- Limkokwing University of Creative Technology
- University of Cyberjaya
- Kolej UNIKOP
- City University Malaysia
- Universiti Malaysia Perlis, UniMAP (Cyberjaya campus)

=== Public schools ===
All public schools are administered by the Sepang District Education Department, a regional subdivision of Ministry of Education (Malaysia)

==== Primary ====
- Sekolah Kebangsaan Cyberjaya
- Sekolah Jenis Kebangsaan (C) Union

==== Secondary ====
- Sekolah Menengah Kebangsaan Cyberjaya
- Sekolah Seri Puteri (Fully Residential School)

=== Private schools ===
- King Henry VIII College
- ELC International School
- Korean School of Malaysia
- Brainy Bunch International School
- Orient Academy
- Abedeen Academy
- Sekolah Rendah Sri Al Amin
- Sekolah Rendah Islam Al-Imtiyaz
- Falih Junior International Academy
- Soleh Integrated Islamic School

== In popular culture ==
Cyberaya, a fictional city in the famous Malaysian animation series, Ejen Ali, is inspired from Cyberjaya. WAU Animation, the developer of Ejen Ali, is also based in Cyberjaya.

== See also ==
- MSC Cyberport
- Technology Park Malaysia
- List of technology centers
- Kirkby International College
- Sepang topics
- Science and technology in Malaysia

== Sources ==
- Town & Country Planning Department, Malaysia (2000), Urban Design Guidelines for Cyberjaya, Kuala Lumpur, Malaysia: Selangor Town & Country Planning Department
- Multimedia Development Corporation (2003), Guidelines on Telecommunication Infrastructure & Facilities Provisioning for Buildings in MSC, Kuala Lumpur, Malaysia: Multimedia Development Corporation
