= Kirkby International College =

College in Sepang, Selangor, Malaysia

Coordinates: 2.9105°N 101.6531411°E

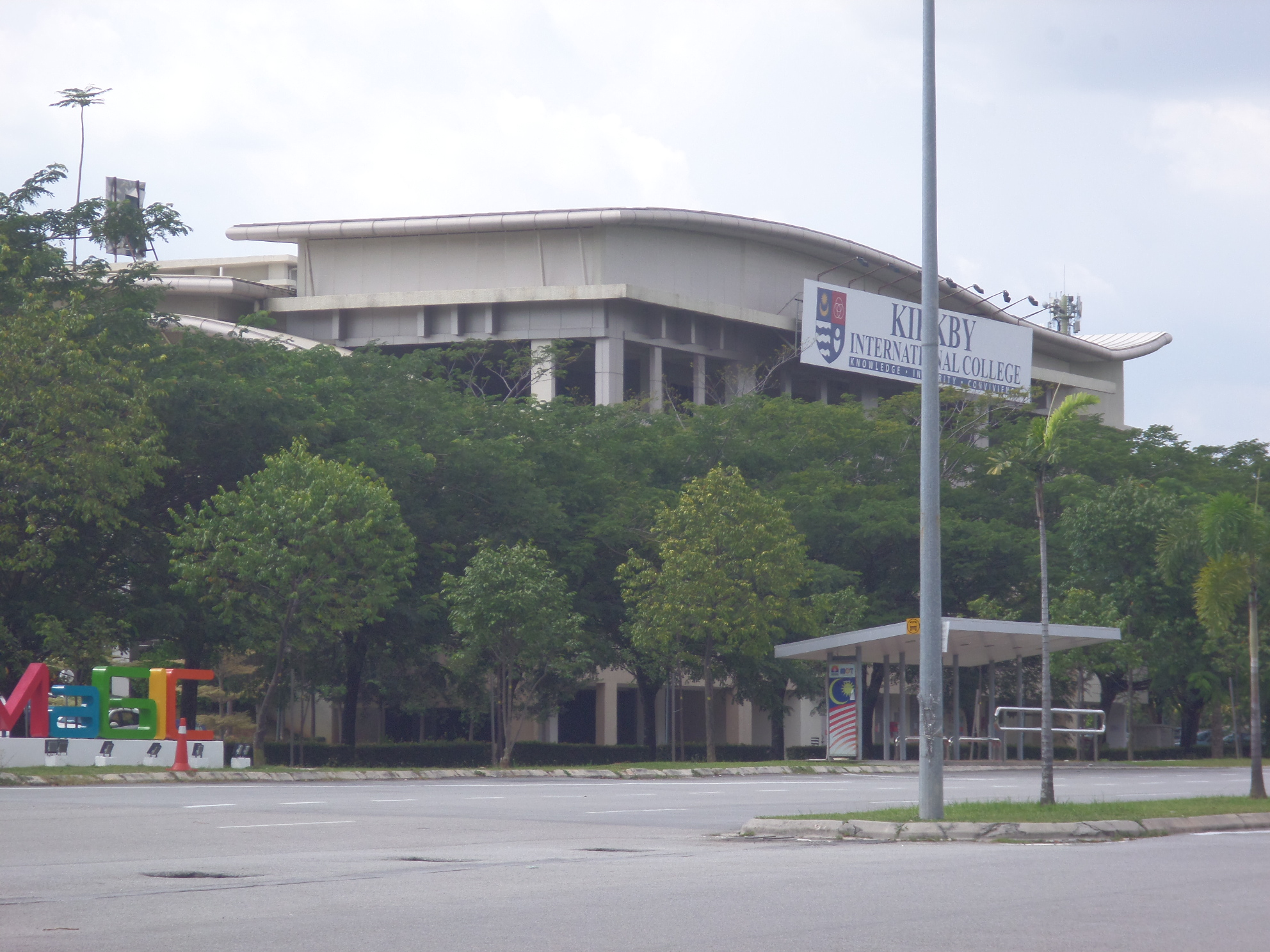
- Type: Further education college
- Established: January 2014
- Location: Pesiaran APEC, Cyberjaya, Selangor, Malaysia

Kirkby International College (KIC) was a further education college based at Pesiaran APEC, Cyberjaya, Selangor, Malaysia. The institution was officially launched by the Malaysian Deputy Prime Minister Tan Sri Muhyiddin Yassin in January 2014.

== History ==
The college was originally established in 2007 under the name Internexia College, to reflect a close affiliation with its digital content creation partner, Internexia Sdn Bhd. However, and probably as a result of its focus on teacher training and English learning courses, the college was suggested by some to be a contemporary return of the Malayan Teachers Training College in Kirkby, Liverpool, England, which closed down in 1962 and which is credited with having produced highly capable Malaysian teachers in its day. In 2011, Internexia College subsequently changed its name to Kirkby International College to better reflect its role as an English learning institution for Malaysian teachers.

This college had permanently closed by early 2017.

== Location ==
Kirkby International College was a purpose built facility located at Pesiaran APEC, Cyberjaya.

== Courses offered ==
Kirkby International College specialised in the provision of diploma level programs in English, creative media, ICT Education, training materials for serving teachers to update their professional skills, associated management, and interactive multimedia-based education and skills training to meet local as well as international demand.

Kirby International College offered local and international programs including, Cambridge A-Levels, Diplomas (early childhood education and English), Foundation Courses (University of Hertfordshire) and pathways to Degrees.

== Partnerships ==
- University of Hertfordshire (UK)
- University Pendidikan Sultan Idris
- Glyndwr University (UK)
- The Open Polytechnic of New Zealand
