= Geneviève Fauconnier =

French novelist

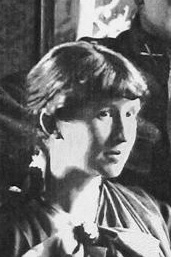
- Geneviève Fauconnier
- Born: 3 January 1886; Barbezieux, France
- Died: 11 December 1969 (aged 83); Saint-Palais-de-Négrignac, France
- Occupation: Novelist
- Known for: Prix Femina, 1933
- Notable work: Claude (1933)
- Relatives: Henri Fauconnier (brother)

Geneviève Fauconnier (French pronunciation: [ʒənvjɛv fokɔnje]; Barbezieux, 3 January 1886 – Saint-Palais-de-Négrignac, 11 December 1969) was a French novelist who lived in the south of the Charente département (France). She was one of the most sensitive members of the so-called Groupe de Barbezieux. Her brother, Henri Fauconnier (Prix Goncourt in 1930) and Jacques Chardonne (Grand Prix du roman de l'Académie française in 1932) were some of the most famous writers of this group.

She won the Prix Femina in 1933 with her novel Claude. Harold Strauss's 1937 review of Claude in The New York Times featured a large portrait of Fauconnier. Time magazine also reviewed Claude in 1937.

== Complete work ==
- Les trois petits enfants bleus, 1927
- Micheline à bord du Nibong, 1932 (written in 1910)
- Claude, 1933 (Prix Femina)
- Les étangs de la Double, 1935
- Pastorale, 1942
- Christine et les Micocouliers, 1948
- Les enfances du Christ, 1956
- Évocations, 1960
