= Groupe de Barbezieux =

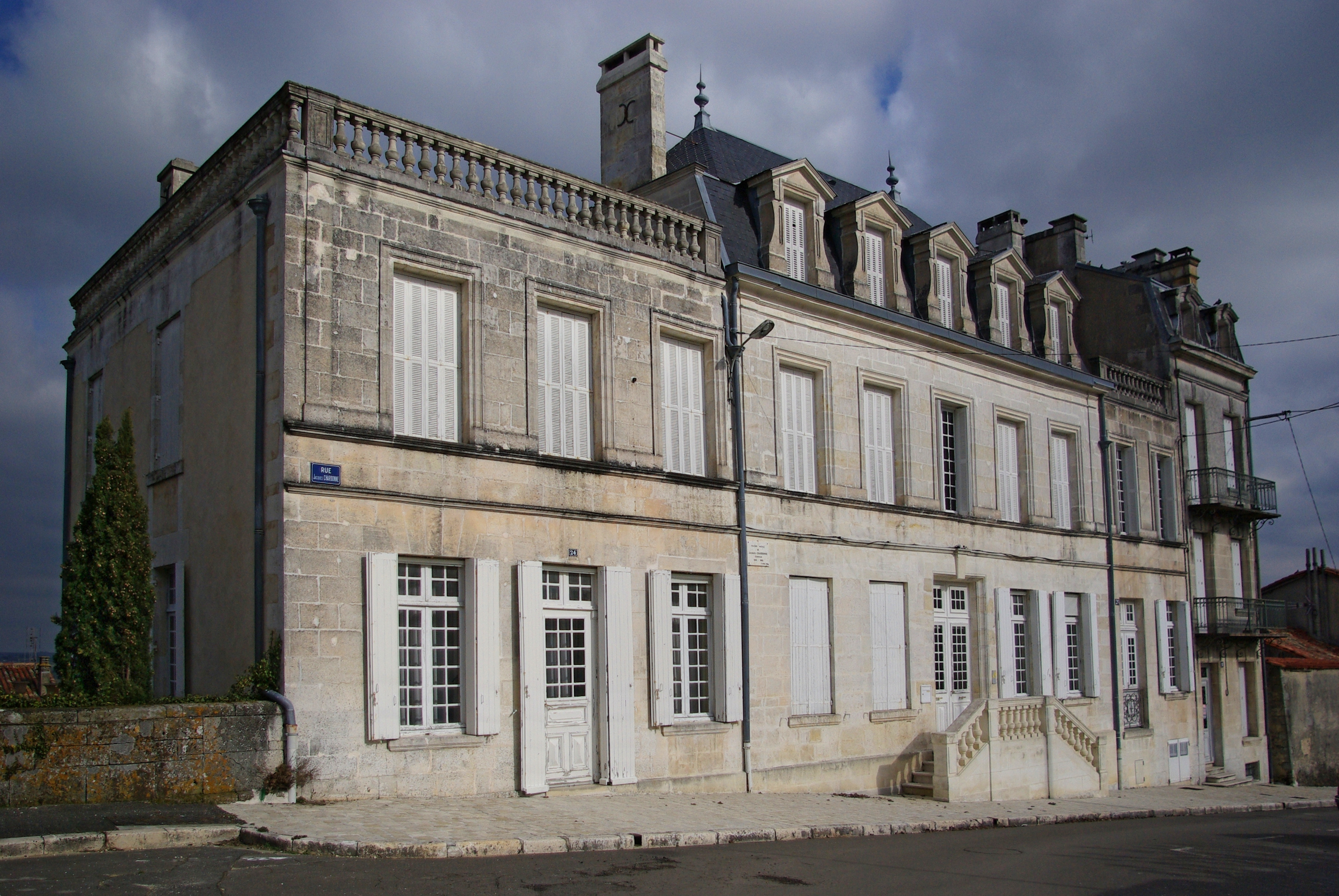

The Groupe de Barbezieux (French pronunciation: [ɡʁup də baʁbəzjø]; Barbezieux Group) were French writers from three Charentais families, Fauconnier, Boutelleau and Delamain, who were childhood friends in the town of Barbezieux, in the Charente département, France. Although the école de Barbezieux (school of Barbezieux) is often mentioned, they did not necessarily share the same outlook.

Fauconnier family :

- Henri Fauconnier, prix Goncourt 1930 for the novel Malaisie, and his sister
- Geneviève Fauconnier, prix Fémina 1933 for the novel Claude.

Boutelleau :

- Germaine Boutelleau (1876-1956), married Jacques Delamain,
- Jacques Boutelleau (1884-1968), later took the name Jacques Chardonne.

Delamain :

- Jacques Delamain, writer on ornithology,
- Robert Delamain,
- Maurice Delamain, co-director of Éditions Stock with Jacques Chardonne from 1921 to 1959,

One could add :

- François Fontaine, son-in-law of Henri Fauconnier.
