= Bukit Tunku =

Neighbourhood in Kuala Lumpur, Malaysia

Coordinates: 3°10′00.1″N 101°40′53″E

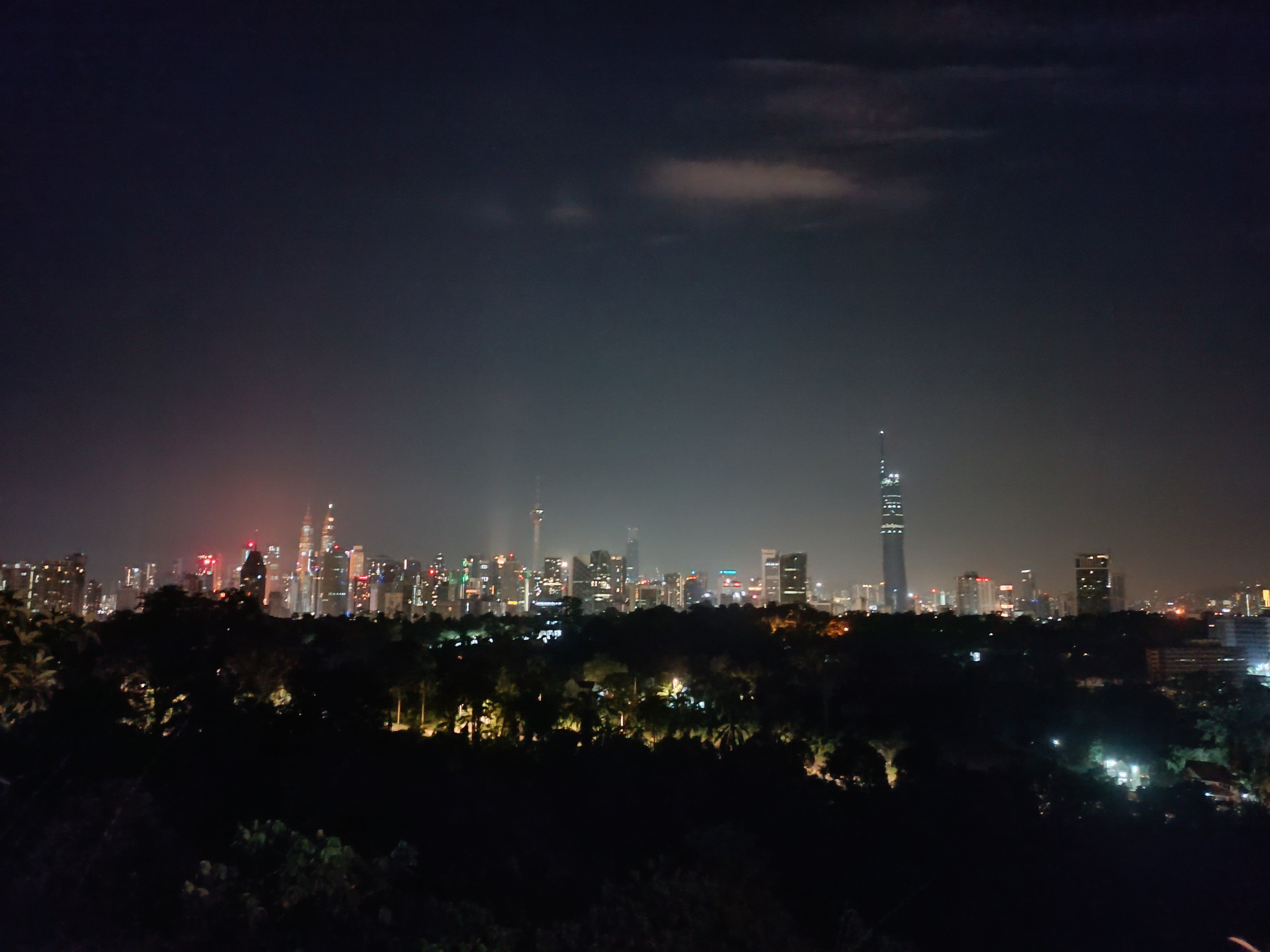
View of Kuala Lumpur from Changkat Tunku lookout point at Bukit Tunku

Bukit Tunku is an upper-class residential area in Kuala Lumpur, Malaysia. It was formerly known as Bukit Kenny or Kenny Hills. Bukit Tunku hosts many luxury condominiums and villas and is surrounded by many housing projects. Houses in Bukit Tunku regularly sell for up to RM 6 million on an 8,000 sq ft (740 m^{2}) land area and a 6,000 sq ft (560 m^{2}) built-up area.

== Education ==
The Asia School of Business is located in Bukit Tunku, with its new campus being constructed on 30-acre of land located by the headquarters of Bank Negara Malaysia. The French School of Kuala Lumpur moved to Bukit Tunku in 1983. In 2005 it moved again into its current campus in Segambut.

== Transport ==
Although Bukit Tunku lacks nearby public transport, it remains well-connected and accessible via the Lebuhraya Duta-Sungai Buloh, North-South Expressway, and Lebuhraya Sultan Iskandar. The Putra Komuter train station is located nearby.

Despite its inconvenience for public transport, Bukit Tunku is sited right next to the central business district of Kuala Lumpur, divided by Jalan Kuching, it is close to all commercial and retail facilities of the city centre. To the southwest is another upmarket residential address, Taman Duta,” according to The Edge, a Malaysian business newspaper.
