= Country Heights =

Township in Kajang, Selangor, Malaysia

Coordinates: 2.9915834°N 101.7294178°E

Country Heights in Kajang, Selangor, Malaysia

Country Heights Kajang is a township located in Kajang, Selangor, Malaysia, which was created in 1992. A former Rubber Plantation estate's 480 acres of land was transformed and was named "Beverly Hills of Malaysia". It is considered as the country's first gated and guarded country-living community. The population consists of mostly high-income and influential people. Although it is meant to provide safety and security for residents, around 5.7% report instances of criminal activity anyway.

== Country Heights Resort ==
Country Heights Resort and Leisure (CHRL) is a resort in the Country Heights township. CHRL offers residents sports, banquet, food and beverage facilities.

== Notable residents ==
- Mahathir Mohamad - former Malaysian Prime Minister (1981–2003, 2018-2020)
- Yusry Abdul Halim - Musician, Celebrity, Film Director
- YB Santhara Kumar - Politician, Member of Parliament
- Anwar Ibrahim - Malaysia 10th Prime Minister

== Transportation ==
=== Car ===
Exit 210 on the PLUS toll road.

=== Public transportation ===
The KTMB tracks run through the eastern boundary of the housing area, but does not stop in the area. The nearest railway stations in this area are MRT/Komuter Kajang and Komuter Serdang.
