= French School of Kuala Lumpur =

- Lycée français de Kuala Lumpur Henri-Fauconnier; Sekolah Perancis Kuala Lumpur
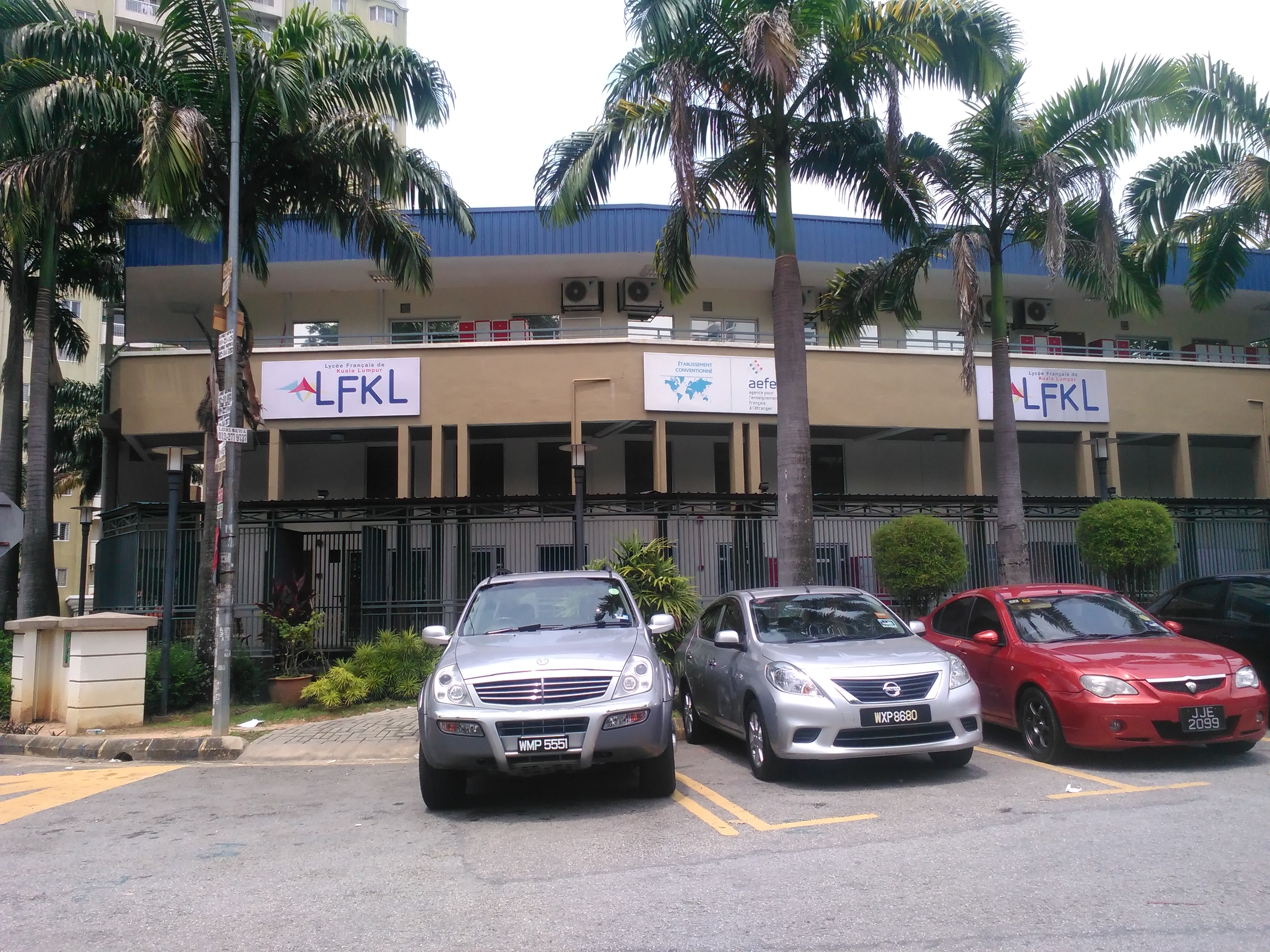

Location
- 34, Jalan Dutamas Raya - 51200 Kuala Lumpur
- Coordinates: 3.1789586°N 101.65380159999995°E

Information
- Type: Private, international school
- Principal: Stéphan Krecina
- Enrolment: 680
- Website: lfkl.edu.my

The French School of Kuala Lumpur (French: Lycée français de Kuala Lumpur Henri-Fauconnier, LFKL; Malay: Sekolah Perancis Kuala Lumpur) is a French international school in Segambut, Kuala Lumpur, Malaysia. Its education levels range from kindergarten through lycée (senior high school).

The school first opened in 1962. It moved to Bukit Tunku in 1983. The main campus was along Jalan Tun Ismail, while the preschool (maternelle) was on a separate site. In 2004 the first stone of the current campus was laid. In September of the following year the current campus opened.
