= Puteri Wilayah National Secondary School =

- Sekolah Menengah Kebangsaan Puteri Wilayah
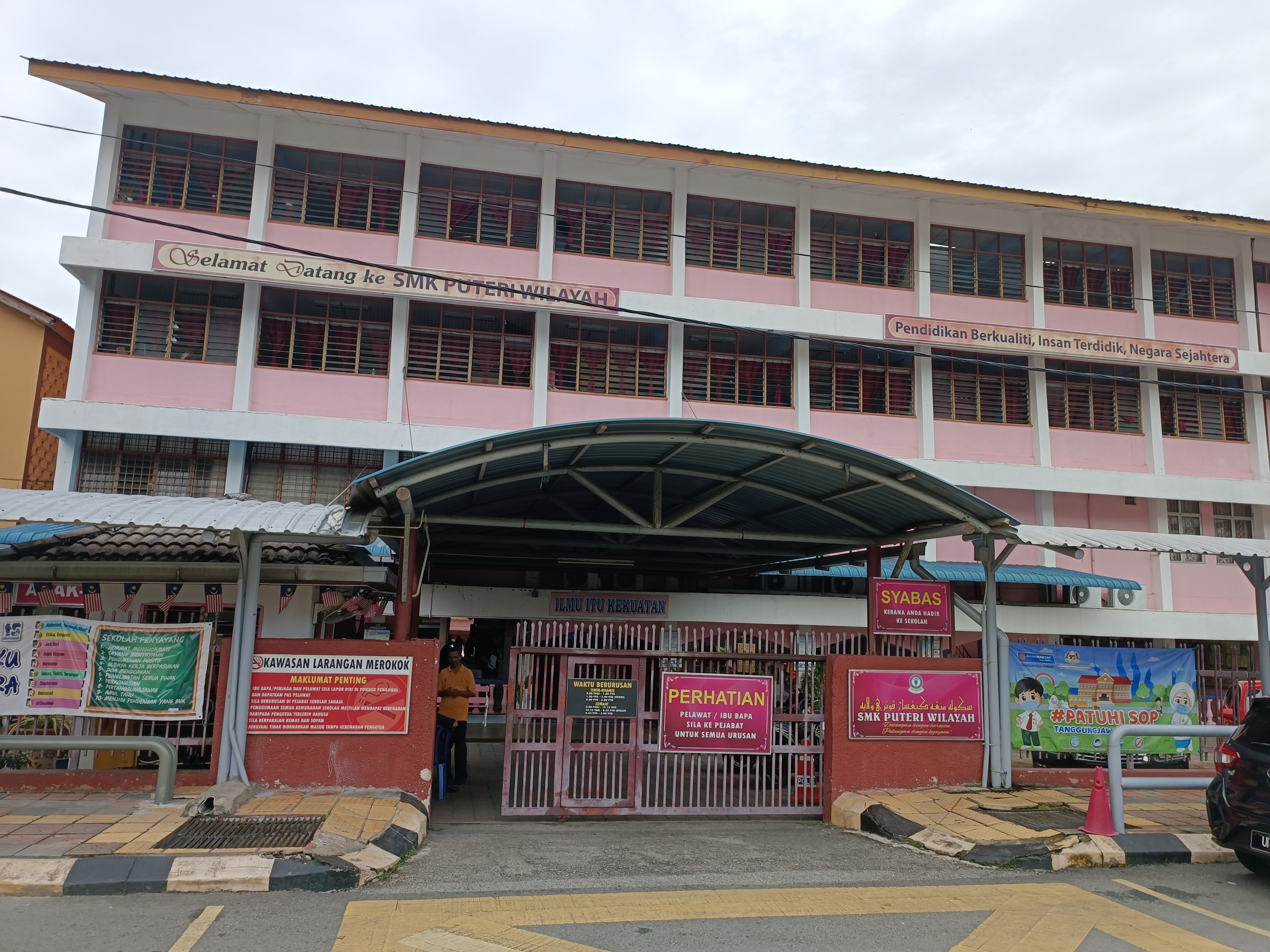

Location
- Jalan Dewan Sultan Sulaiman; Kampung Baru, Kuala Lumpur, 50300; Malaysia
- 3.16196°N 101.70061°E

Information
- Type: National secondary school, government school
- Motto: Ilmu itu Kekuatan
- Established: 1965; 61 years ago
- School code: WEA0197

Puteri Wilayah National Secondary School (Malay: Sekolah Menengah Kebangsaan Puteri Wilayah) is an all girls' school in Kampung Baru, Kuala Lumpur, Malaysia.

The school was built in 1965 and was once known as 'Sekolah Menengah Kampung Bharu Jalan Stoney'. It is located in Kampung Bharu in front of the Sultan Sulaiman Sport Club. The school was registered on 11 January 1966, it had to share administration with Sekolah Menengah Jenis Kebangsaan Inggeris Kampung Bharu. On 1 January 1989, the school changed its name to Sekolah Menengah Kebangsaan Puteri Wilayah.

Starting with 'kelas peralihan' up until form 5, and continue until 1989 when form 6 'aliran sastera' was started. Three years later in 1992, the form 6 classes were disbanded because of the lack of attendance.

The SMK Puteri Wilayah is known as 'asrama harian persekutuan' (daily hostel). The hostel was opened until 2003, and received many female students from schools across Kuala Lumpur. However, in 2004, the hostels was only opened for the students of SMK Puteri Wilayah.
