= Elc International School =

elc International School

Location
- Selangor; Malaysia
- Coordinates: 3.2076°N 101.5815°E

Information
- Type: International school
- Motto: Learn to aspire
- Established: 1987
- Website: elc.edu.my

elc International School is an international school located across two campuses in Selangor, Malaysia: one in Sungai Buloh and one in Cyberjaya.

== History ==
elc International School started as elc Secondary School in 1987 with 5 students and 6 teachers including the Principal. The school was formed in order to provide a legitimate vehicle to privately educate this small group of children, 3 of whom were the children of the founders namely Dr. & Mrs. Kaloo and Dr & Mrs. Ghazalli. The School was registered as a secondary school, under the terms of the Education Act 1961, to prepare qualified children for the GCE O-Levels in May 1989. In June 1992, the school was given permission to add a Primary Division to the established Secondary Division. During this time, elc operated out of two campuses within the Taman Tun Dr. Ismail area, one for the Primary Division and another for the Secondary Division.

=== Sungai Buloh ===
Around 1995, a decision was made to consolidate the Primary and Secondary division and operate out of a single campus. In January 1997 the school relocated to its new campus at Sungai Buloh, Selangor.

=== Cyberjaya ===
The success of Sungai Buloh campus motivated the school authorities to expand to a second campus and offer the benefit of our education to more children. Thus, elc International School, Cyberjaya Campus opened its doors for the first time on September 6, 2010. Following in the footsteps of its sister campus, Cyberjaya started small and grew to rival the other bigger international schools in the region.
