= SMK Sentul Utama =

Public coeducational secondary school in Jalan Ipoh, Malaysia

Location
- Jalan Ipoh, 2 1/2 mile 51200 Kuala Lumpur; Sentul, Federal Territory of Kuala Lumpur, Jalan Ipoh; Malaysia

Information
- Type: Public coeducational secondary
- Motto: Berilmu, Berhemah, Berwawasan
- Established: 2010
- School district: Sentul
- Chairman: Encik Che Ku Mahhadi Bin Che Ku Abdullah (2010-now)
- Principal: Puan Hajah Maznah Haji Mazlan (2010-2014) Puan Norsiah Yahya (2014-2019) Puan Che Ma Rabitah (2019-2022) Puan Nor Aswalela Abdullah (2023-now)
- Teaching staff: 78 (current)
- Grades: Form 1 - Form 5
- Enrollment: 1000+
- Language: Malay, English
- Affiliations: Malaysia Ministry Of Education
- Website: smksu0253.blogspot.com

Sekolah Menengah Kebangsaan Sentul Utama, or SMKSU, is a morning-session public coeducational secondary school located in Malaysia. The school is known for its architecture and building design which is the second tallest building in Malaysia.

== History ==
SMKSU was established in 2010 with Form 1, Form 2 and Form 4. The students were under the supervision of Puan Hajah Maznah Binti Haji Mazlan, the ex-principal of SMK Setapak Indah. Initially there were 200-300 students. Now the number of students is above 800.

=== Principals ===
- Puan Hajah Maznah Haji Mazlan (2010-2014)
- Puan Norsiah Yahya (2014–present)
- Puan Che Ma Rabitah (2019-2022)
- Puan Aswalela Abdullah (2023-now)

=== Head Prefects ===
- 2010-2011 - Dhivien Sean Raj A/L Selva Kumaran
- 2011-2012 - Syafiq Abdul Latiff
- 2012-2013 - Nik Nur Muhammad Ameer Nik Zainudin
- 2013-2014 - Prasana A/P Arasu
- 2014-2015 - Muhammad Syahrul Nizam
- 2015-2016 - Wan Nur Arina
- 2016-2017 - M.Ammar Faruq
- 2017-2018 - Tan kar Hoe
- 2018-2019 - M.Hafiz

==== Head Librarians ====
- 2016-2017 - Nur Syahirah Azman
- 2017-2018 - Zakirah Nur Alya
- 2018-2019 - Nur Aina Ashikin

== Facilities ==
SMKSU has two blocks of class rooms, labs, an Academic block, Staff room, Office, Examination room, Library, Multimedia room and a Meeting room. Besides that the school has a canteen, a multi-purpose hall and two computer labs also an koperasi
