= Korean School of Malaysia =

Primary school in Sepang, Selangor, Malaysia

- 말레이시아한국국제학교

Location
- No 7&8, Jalan CV 2, Selangor Cyber Valley 63300 Cyberjaya, Selangor; Cyberjaya, Selangor (Sepang); Malaysia; 2.9209293°N 101.62265200000002°E

Information
- Type: Primary school
- Colors: blue, yellow, orange, white
- Website: ksmy.kr

Korean School of Malaysia (KSMY; Korean: 말레이시아한국국제학교) is a Korean international school in Cyberjaya, Sepang District, Selangor, Malaysia.

It opened in September 2016 with 70 students in primary school and 14 students in preschool, becoming the first Korean international school in that country. The government of South Korea and the Korean community of Malaysia funded the school.
