= Jacques Chardonne =

French writer (1884–1968)

Jacques Chardonne (born Jacques Boutelleau; 2 January 1884, in Barbezieux-Saint-Hilaire, Charente – 29 May 1968, in La Frette-sur-Seine) is the pseudonym of French writer Jacques Boutelleau. He was a member of the so-called Groupe de Barbezieux.

== Early life and career ==
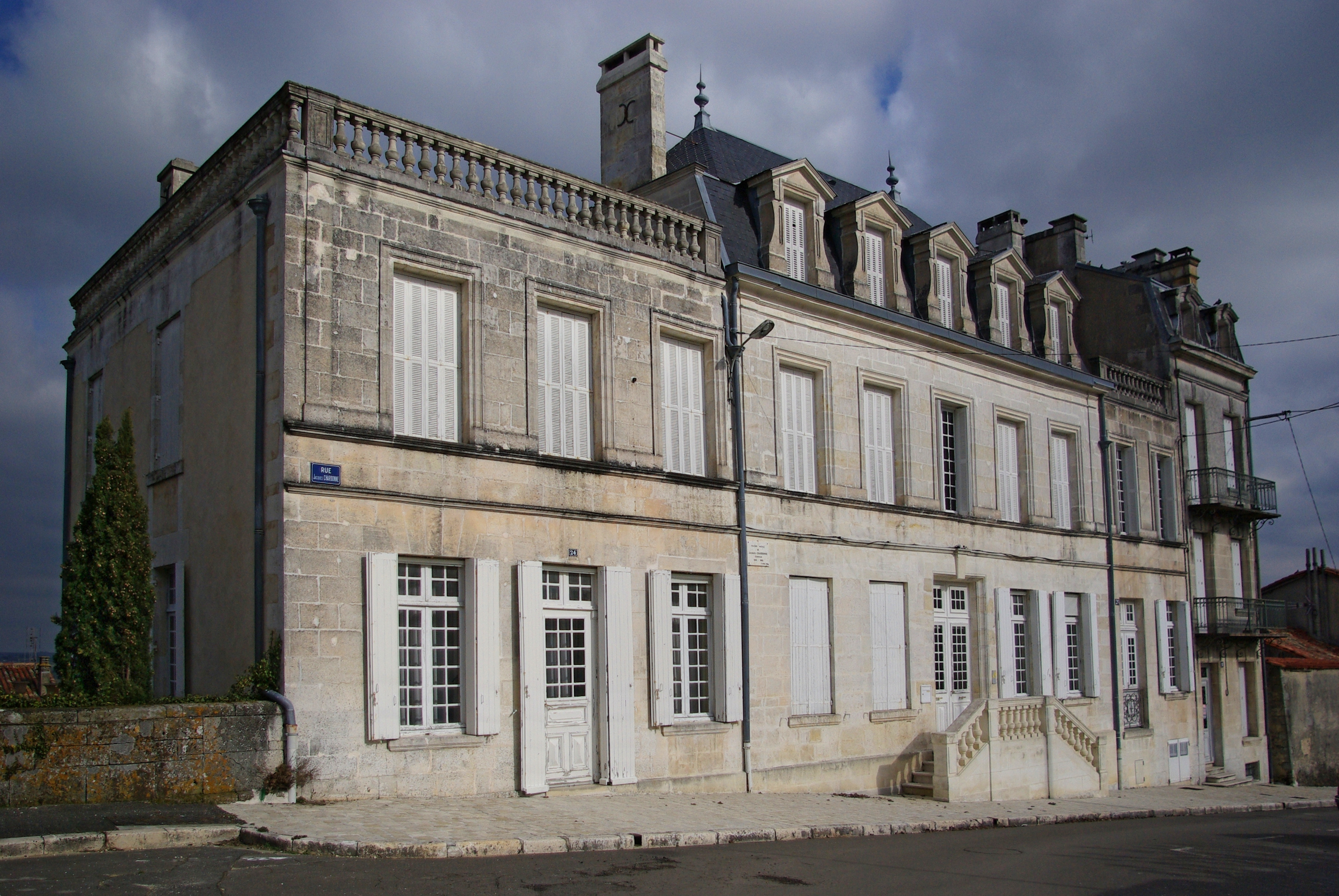
Jacques Chardonne birthplace in Barbezieux, Charente, France

His American Quaker mother was an heiress to the Haviland porcelain dynasty and his father was French. He was raised Protestant. His brother-in-law was of the Delamain cognac dynasty. This informed his trilogy Les Destinées Sentimentales. He was a leader of the Hussards and held in high regard for the award-winning Claire.

== World War II ==
He supported collaboration with the Vichy and in 1940 produced "Private Chronicle 1940", which favored the submission of Europe to Adolf Hitler. He was a member of the Groupe Collaboration, an initiative that encouraged close cultural ties between France and Germany. In October 1941, Chardonne, with seven other French writers including Pierre Drieu la Rochelle, Marcel Jouhandeau et Robert Brasillach, accepted an invitation from Joseph Goebbels to visit Germany for a Congress of European Writers in Weimar. In his diary during the trip, Chardonne described how he wanted to "make [his] body a fraternal bridge between Germany and France". After World War II he was denounced for Nazi collaboration and spent time in prison. In an article titled "Jacques Chardonne et Mein Kampf" the 'Frenchness' of his writing was also questioned.

== Death and rehabilitation ==
He died in 1968 after efforts to restore his image. By the 1980s anti-totalitarian journalists like Raymond Aron began to reappraise collaborationist authors like Chardonne. In 1986 his award-winning Claire was made into a TV film and in 2001 Olivier Assayas adapted Les Destinées Sentimentales to film.

== Awards ==
- 1932 Grand Prix du roman de l'Académie française, with Claire (Grasset)
- The Prix Jacques-Chardonne established in 1986 is named after him.

== Works (in French) ==
- 1921 : L'Épithalame (Paris, librairie Stock et Vienne, Larousse, 1921; Grasset, 1929; Ferenczi, 1933; Albin-Michel, 1951; S. C. Edit. Rencontre, Lausanne, 1961; L.G.F., 1972; Albin-Michel, 1987);
- 1927 : Le Chant du Bienheureux (Librairie Stock, 1927; Albin-Michel, 1951);
- 1929 : Les Varais, dédié à Maurice Delamain (Grasset, 1929; Ferenczi et fils, 1932; Albin-Michel, 1951; Grasset, 1989);
- 1930 : Eva ou le journal interrompu, dédié à Camille Belguise, sa seconde épouse (Grasset, 1930; Ferenczi et fils, 1935; Albin-Michel, 1951; Gallimard, 1983);
- 1931 : Claire, dédié à Henri Fauconnier (Grasset, 1931; Ferenczi et fils, 1936; Piazza, 1938; Albin-Michel, 1952; club du Livre du Mois, 1957; Rombaldi, 1975; Grasset, 1983);
- 1932 : L'Amour du Prochain, dédié « à mon fils Gérard » (Grasset, 1932; La Jeune Parque, 1947; Albin-Michel, 1955);
- 1934 : Les Destinées sentimentales (Grasset, 1934-1936), trilogie : La Femme de Jean Barnery, dédié à Jacques Delamain (id., 1934); Pauline (id., 1934); Porcelaine de Limoges (id., 1936; Grasset, 1947; Albin-Michel, 1951; L.G.F., 1984)
- 1937 : Romanesques, dédié à Paul Géraldy (Stock, 1937; édit. Colbert et Stock, 1943; Albin-Michel, 1954; La Table Ronde, 1996);
- 1937 : L'Amour, c'est beaucoup plus que l'amour, dédié « à Jean Rostand son ami » (Stock, 1937, 1941; Albin-Michel, 1957, puis 1992);
- 1938 : Le Bonheur de Barbezieux, dédié à Marcel Arland (Stock, 1938, 1943; Monaco, édit. du Rocher, 1947; Albin-Michel, 1955, Stock, 1980);
- 1940 : Chronique privée, dédié « à ma fille France » (Stock, 1940);
- Chronique privée de l'an 40, dédié à Maurice Delamain (id.);
- 1941 : Voir la Figure - Réflexions sur ce temps, dédié « à mon ami André Thérive (...) souvenirs de l'année 1941 à Paris » (Grasset, 1941);
- 1941 : Attachements - Chronique privée (Stock, 1941; Albin-Michel, 1955);
- 1943 : Le Ciel de Nieflheim, 1943. Extraits publiés dans les Cahiers Jacques-Chardonne No. 2 et 3;
- 1948 : Chimériques (Monaco, édit. du Rocher, 1948 et 1992; Albin-Michel, 1954);
- 1953 : Vivre à Madère (Grasset, 1953; Albin-Michel, 1954);
- 1954 : Lettres à Roger Nimier et quelques réponses de Roger Nimier (Grasset, 1954; Albin Michel, 1955, rééd. Albin Michel, 1986)
- 1956 : Matinales, dédié à André Sabatier (Albin-Michel);
- 1959 : Le Ciel dans la fenêtre, dédié à Roger Nimier (Albin-Michel, 1959; La Table Ronde, 1998);
- 1961 : Femmes - contes choisis et quelques images, dédié à Camille Belguise (Albin-Michel);
- 1962 : Détachements, Paris, édit. td - Jean-Paul Caracalla (1962; Albin-Michel, 1969);
- 1964 : Demi-jour - suite et fin du Ciel dans la fenêtre (Albin-Michel);
- 1964 : Catherine (Albin-Michel);
- 1966 : Propos comme ça (Grasset).
