= Sekolah Indonesia Kuala Lumpur =

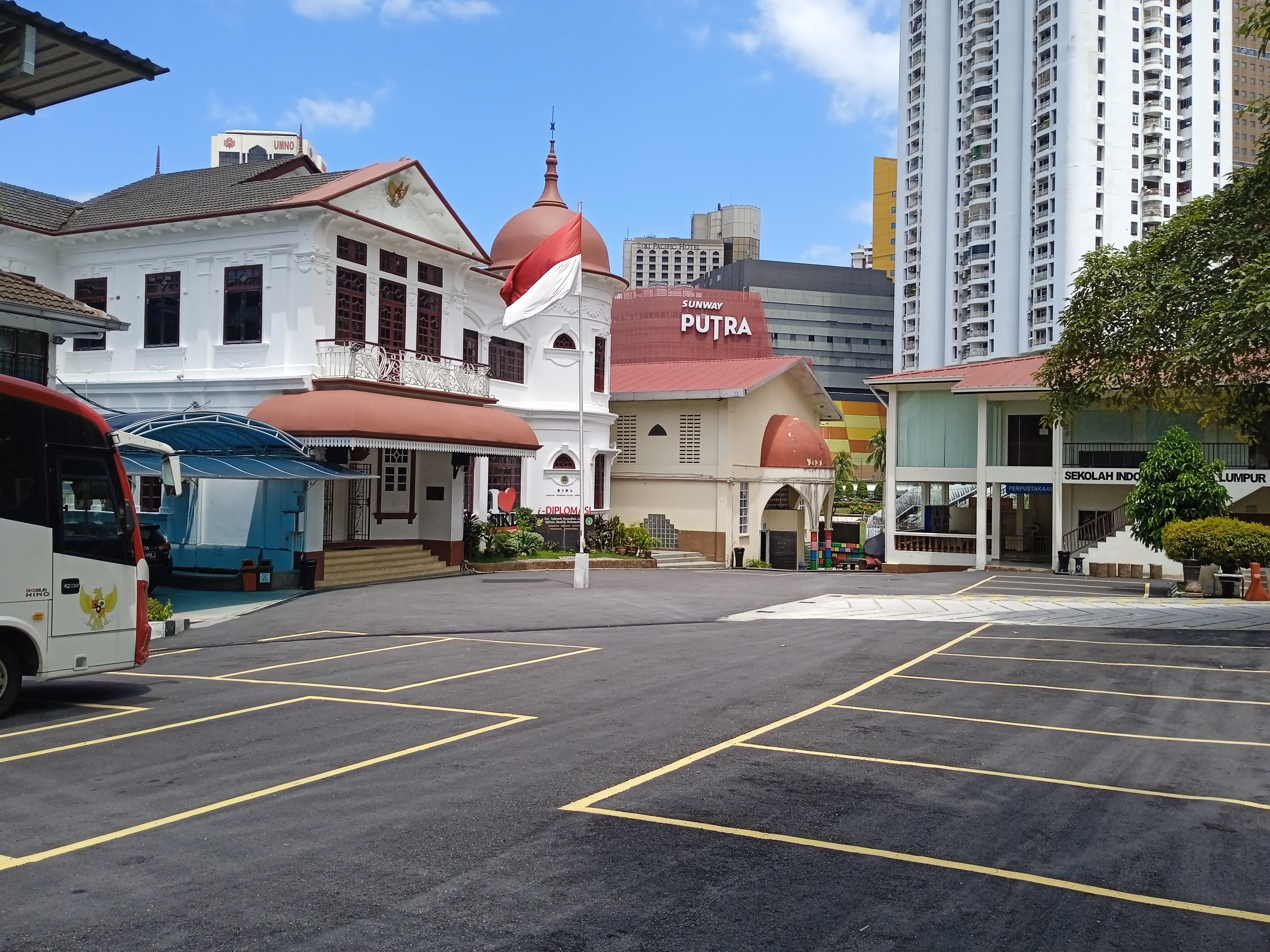

Location
- No.1 Lorong Tun Ismail 50480 Kuala Lumpur
- Coordinates: 3.1646488°N 101.69080239999994°E

Information
- Type: Private, international school
- Website: sekolahindonesia.edu.my

Sekolah Indonesia Kuala Lumpur (SIKL) is an Indonesian international school in Kuala Lumpur. It goes up to SMA (senior high school/sixth form) level.
