= Henri Fauconnier =

French writer (1879–1973)

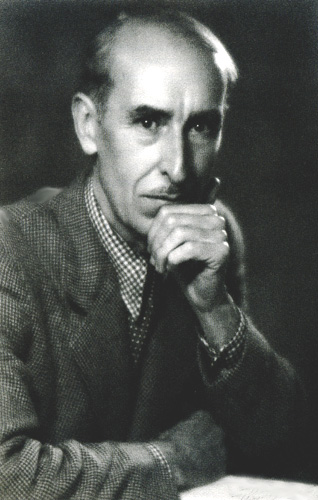
Henri Fauconnier

Henri Fauconnier (French pronunciation: [ɑ̃ʁi fokɔnje]; 26 February 1879 – 14 April 1973) was a French writer, known mainly for his novel Malaisie, which won the Prix Goncourt in 1930. He was part of the Groupe de Barbezieux.

== Family ==
Fauconnier was born at the Villa Musset Barbezieux (Charente), the son of Charles, a brandy dealer who operated on his property near Cru Chevanceaux, and Melanie, who lived in Limoges, where she was the best friend of Anna Haviland of Haviland porcelain. Haviland had arranged the 1874 marriage between the pair after she had married George Boutelleau, Barbezilien poet, playwright and novelist (his family produced and promoted the brandy butter Charente). Fauconnier was the third of six children. His siblings included Genevieve Fauconnier (1886–1969), herself an award-winning writer who received the Prix Femina in 1933. He later sired his own son, Bernard.

== Biography ==
=== In Barbezieux ===
In a cultured, artistic Catholic family of six children, Fauconnier lived very freely with his siblings, cousins and friends in the garden and cellars of Musset. His friend Jacques Boutelleau (who would later be known under the pen name Jacques Chardonne following the publication of The Epithalame in 1921) came every day. They published a newspaper, and dramas were played on the castle square with text and music written by Fauconnier. In 1901, Fauconnier's father died following a long illness, and Fauconnier left Bordeaux for England, where he taught French music for two years in the small college of Wells House. There, a journal article drew his attention, suggesting there was a fortune to make in Borneo by planting sago. The idea took shape: if he wanted to write, he must first become a man of leisure. The easiest way to become a man of leisure would be to first make a fortune.

=== Malaysia ===
He left Marseille on 10 March 1905. On a stopover in Singapore, a month later, he decided to leave for the Borneo rubber plantations of Malaysia, which seemed more promising. He got an internship at his expense to a planter Klang near Kuala Lumpur so that he could learn the craft and the two essential languages, Malay and Tamil. In August, he discovered the location where he would eventually open his own plantation, in fertile land located on the distant hills beyond the Selangor River. He obtained a grant of 600 acres (2.4 km^{2}) and settled in Rantau Panjang in early 1906, when he built his first "Maison des Palmes". He loved all people, places, landscapes, hard work, the climate, life and 'la vie'. His mother mobilizes funds for this rich uncle to "give" her younger sisters. Thanks to these 20,000 francs, and the funds that his friend Jacques puts into his business, he was able to begin planting. In 1908, he founded at Brussels the "Plantation Fauconnier & Posth", with the assistance of the banker Adrian Hallet. He converted all he had in stocks and founder shares. Some friends joined the Charente to help expand its plantations. His grew wealthy with a doubling in the price of rubber in two years and the tripling of the value of its shares in the single year 1910. He was then chief of the Hallet plantation group, in the Far East (Sumatra, Java, Indochina and Malaysia). In 1911, on an idea of Hallet, he sent a few bags of seeds of palm oil (Elaeis guineensis) from Sumatra to Malaysia which would grow into the vast plantations of Malaysia. He established Tennamaram near Rantau Panjang, the first plantation of palm oil from Malaysia. After several visits to Malaysia, his family joined him there to settle. But, he felt that a page in his life had turned: material success was assured, and it had only been a means to an end. Keeping an eye on the plantation, he arranged to delegate his powers so that he might finally devote himself to writing.

=== World War I and marriage ===
But nobody expected World War I. Fauconnier married Madeleine Meslier, the sister of a planter who was a childhood friend of Barbezieux, but refused the French Consul's request that he remain where he was to ensure the continued production of rubber. Instead, he enlisted with the other French men at the plantation. After a few months in a depot of Périgueux (a place of prevailing squalor, stupidity, and military negligence), he arrived where he would remain as second class in most major battles except for two periods: first, for training officer school at Mourmelon-le-Grand in late 1916, and, second, for leave in Malaysia after his marriage in Charente in March 1917. From there he left for a few months to Indochina with the Annamese sharpshooters to attend Auguste Chevallier. In autumn 1917, he was reclaimed by France as an interpreter for the British army. He left his wife in Saigon, pregnant and sick. (When she returned with her daughter in April 1918, the ship which carried them in the Mediterranean was torpedoed.) Throughout the war, he cursed the Europeans and dreamed of being in Malaysia. The letters he wrote his wife in this period were published in 1998 as Letters to Madeleine, 1914–1918.

=== In Tunisia ===
After he was discharged, he left his wife in Switzerland, near Chardonne, as she was threatened with tuberculosis. Then he left to return to the plantations, which needed his help to expand Hallet. Through 1928, he made several inspection trips to Malaysia and Indochina, bound first by a long rubber crisis. Then, to ensure a more stable income, he accepted a position as director of several companies of tropical plantations. Liking neither the city of Paris nor the climate of France, he settled in Rades, near Tunis, in 1925. This was, for him, a compromise of remoteness and climate between Malaysia and the Charente. He occupied "The Terrace", a large low house in Arabic style surrounded by a huge garden.

=== Malaisie and the Prix Goncourt ===
In 1931, Jean Paulhan offered to publish Fauconnier's book on Malaysia, enthusiastic about the chapter Fauconnier had displayed. Malaisie, published by Stock, proved very popular and highly respected. But the celebrity that attended on its publication and his winning of the Prix Goncourt did not change Fauconnier. He kept to his usual practices. Being a writer, was not a priority for him; he saw himself as a "man of letters", and his letters show all his correspondent qualities. But he did enjoy his correspondences with other writers, including John Amrouche, Georges Bernanos, Henri Bosco, Jean Cocteau, Colette, Lucie Delarue-Mardrus, Alfred Fabre-Luce, Paul Géraldy, André Gide, Jean Giono, Jean Guéhenno, A. Guibert, Henri de Keyserling, Roger Martin du Gard, Maurice Maeterlinck, Jean Paulhan, Romain Rolland, Jean Schlumberger, and Robert Stiller.

Fauconnier was not the only successful writer in his family; in 1933, the Prix Femina was awarded to his sister Genevieve for her best-selling novel Claude. When she received the reward, Fauconnier and Genevieve Fauconnier became the only brother and sister in France to have ever received the Prix Goncourt and Prix Femina awards.

=== Visions ===
Fauconnier had hated the Treaty of Versailles: he knew that Europe took the huge risk of repeating the vile war of 1914–18. He did not suffer unduly during the Depression of the 1930s because of his resources in Malaysia, but he was troubled deeply by the rise of Nazism, fascism in Italy, the conquest of Abyssinia, and the Spanish Civil War. In October 1938, he published anonymously a collection New Visions discussing some of his past life (it included "The Lady", "Christmas Malay", "Indian Dravidian", "Barbara", "The Asphodèles" and "Vision"). The following summer, fearing the ambitions of Benito Mussolini on Tunisia, he took his family from "the Terrace" to settle in Musset.

=== World War II and the last years ===
Life was not easy during World War II. His children grew up and, despite reservations, he repatriated to France. He was being gradually cut off from his resources in Belgium, England, Malaysia, and Indochina. He had neither the desire nor the courage to write, but preferred instead to listen to the BBC. The postwar period was also difficult, but in 1947 he agreed to be leader of the "Group of Federalists Writers" for the "United States of Europe". It was the hope of the group that, in reconciling the people of Europe, they might prevent its governments from claiming national missions.

In 1957, he was offered a trip to Malaysia for nostalgia's sake by a society of plantations, which had included the Socfin Rivaud Group. Afterwards, he settled into a quiet retirement during which he remained busy playing tennis and chess, gardening and swimming, dreaming of an opportunity to resume writing a sequel to Malaisie and continuing his correspondence. He divided his time between the Côte d'Azur, Paris (where his children and grandchildren lived), and the Charente.

In April 1973, Fauconnier died in Paris and was buried in Barbezieux. His only wish was that Musset be kept in the family.

== Works ==
- Malasia Artes Gráficas Larra, 1931
- Visions Stock (Delamain et Boutelleau), 1938
- Lettres à Madeleine: 1914–1919, Stock, 1998, ISBN 978-2-234-05056-3

=== English translations ===
- Malaisie, Translated by Eric Sutton, The Macmillan company, 1931
- The Soul of Malaya Translated by Eric Sutton E. Mathews and Marrot, 1931

== Sources ==
- Bernard Fauconnier, La fascinante existence d'Henri Fauconnier : Prix Goncourt 1930, préface Jean-Loup Avril, Editions G.D., Saint Malo, 2004.
- Annie David, interview de Bernard Fauconnier, son of Henri, Trente ans après la mort d'Henri Fauconnier, son fils Bernard évoque sa vie exotique et leurs relations houleuses... .
- Véronique Bonnet-Nora, La Maison des Palmes, 2003, documentaire de 50 minutes.
