= Taman Putra Perdana =

Town in Sepang, Selangor, Malaysia

- Township
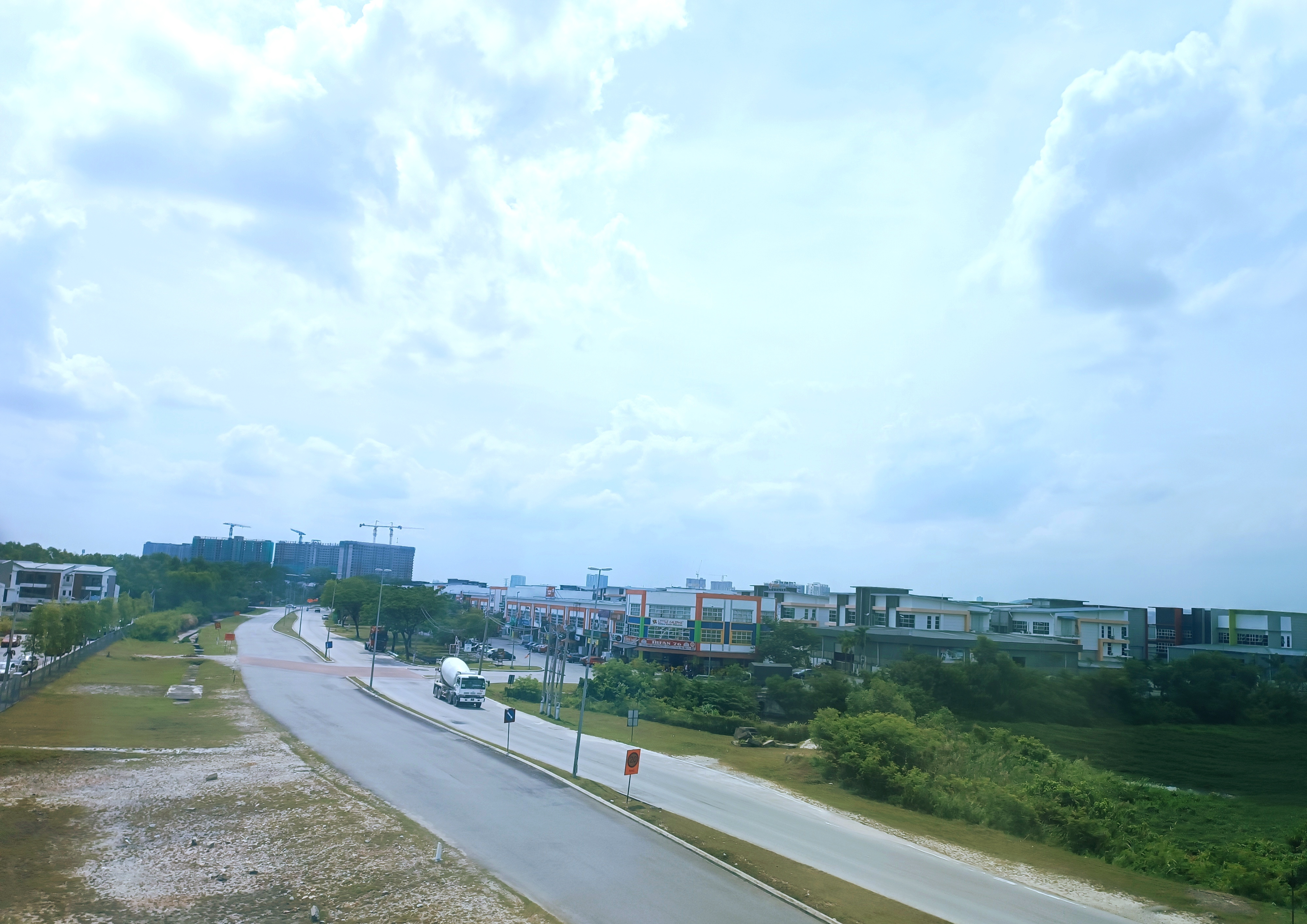
- Country: Malaysia
- State: Selangor
- District: Sepang
- Mukim: Dengkil
- Establishment: 1997

Government
  - Administered by: Sepang Municipal Council
- Time zone: UTC+8 (MST)
  - Summer (DST): Not observed
- Postcode: 47100, 47120, 47130
- Area codes: +603-80, +603-83
- Website: www.mpsepang.gov.my

Taman Putra Perdana is a township in Dengkil sub-district, Sepang District, Selangor, Malaysia. Although the township's postcode is 47100 / 47120 / 47130, which gives it Puchong postal address, it is actually in the Sepang constituency of Selangor, administered by the Sepang Municipal Council (MPSepang). The township was developed by Kenshine Corporation in 1997.

== List of residential areas ==
- Bandar Nusaputra (Presint 1–2)
- Taman Amanputra
- LBS Skylake Residence
- D'Island
- La Cottage
- Siantan Apartment
- Rista Villa Apartment
- Kenanga Apartment
- Rossana Villa Apartment
- Teratai Apartment
- Kiambang Apartment
- Kekwa Apartment
- Dahlia Apartment
- Anggerik Apartment
- Semarak Apartment
- Seroja Apartment
- Ruvena Villa Apartment
- Alpha Arena Apartment
- IT Admiral
- IT Admiral 2
- Elegan Residensi

== Public schools ==
- SK Taman Putra Perdana
- SK Taman Putra Perdana (2)
- SMK Putra Perdana
- SRA Putra Perdana

== Transport ==
=== Expressways/Highways/Roads ===
Taman Putra Perdana is accessible through these 6 main expressways and roads.

- North–South Expressway Central Link North–South Expressway Central Link (ELITE) - towards Shah Alam, Bandar Saujana Putra, Kuala Lumpur International Airport and Nilai
- South Klang Valley Expressway South Klang Valley Expressway (SKVE) via Bandar Saujana Putra - towards Pulau Indah, Banting, Kuala Langat and Kajang
- Damansara–Puchong Expressway Damansara–Puchong Expressway (LDP) via Jalan Puchong–Dengkil - towards Putrajaya, Pusat Bandar Puchong, Bandar Kinrara, Bandar Sunway, Subang Jaya, Petaling Jaya, Damansara and Kepong
- North–South Expressway Central Link Putrajaya Link - towards Cyberjaya and Putrajaya
- Maju Expressway Maju Expressway - towards Seri Kembangan and Kuala Lumpur
- B15 Jalan Puchong–Dengkil - towards Desa Ayer Hitam, Taman Meranti Jaya, Bandar Bukit Puchong, Taman Puchong Utama, Batu 14 Puchong and Bandar Puteri Puchong

=== Public transportation ===
This township is served by stage bus route 601 by Causeway Link (also known as Handal Indah Sdn Bhd) that goes towards Pasar Seni, Kuala Lumpur via Puchong Utama, Batu 14 Puchong, Bandar Puteri Puchong, Tesco Puchong, IOI Puchong, Bandar Kinrara, and Jalan Klang Lama (or Old Klang Road). This service was previously operated by RapidKL (until December 2015) and Metrobus (until October 2016). In addition, Causeway Link also operated bus route 503 that went from Puchong Utama to Putrajaya Sentral via Cyberjaya until 2022. This route was previously operated by Nadi Putra until September 2017.

However, the Causeway Link bus route 601 in Taman Putra Perdana has limited schedule (with 6 trips per direction daily) and unreliable service quality compared to more common RapidKL bus service, where they serve the Puchong Utama bus hub to Pasar Seni via route 600, but they don't operate in the Sepang district zone of Puchong areas, which includes Putra Perdana and Pulau Meranti, due to bus corridor issues.

Due to the unreliable nature of bus service availability, most residents prefer to rely on private vehicles or ride-hailing services to get to the nearest LRT or MRT stations as well as to the Puchong Utama bus hub via Jalan Puchong-Dengkil.

SP31 KJ37 Putra Heights LRT station and SP29 Puchong Prima LRT station are the closest rail stations to Taman Putra Perdana by distance via North–South Expressway Central Link (ELITE) expressway and Jalan Puchong-Dengkil respectively, while PY38 16 Sierra and PY39 Cyberjaya Utara stations of Klang Valley MRT Putrajaya Line was opened on 16 March 2023 and is located only 10 to 15 minutes away from the township. However, there are no feeder bus services available to connect to the nearest LRT or MRT stations from Putra Perdana.

==== Bus routes ====
- ~~503: KT3 PY41 Putrajaya Sentral ERL/MRT - Taman Puchong Utama via Cyberjaya and Taman Putra Perdana (operated by Causeway Link / Handal Indah)~~ (ceased operations since 2022)
- 600: Puchong Utama bus hub - HAB Pasar Seni (alternative bus route accessible via Jalan Puchong-Dengkil or Causeway Link route 601; operated by RapidKL)
- 601: Taman Putra Perdana - HAB Pasar Seni via Puchong Utama, Batu 14 Puchong, and Bandar Puteri Puchong (operated by Causeway Link / Handal Indah) (suspended operations from late 2024 until June 2025)
