= D'Island, Puchong =

Residential area in Selangor, Malaysia

D'Island
- Residential area

Other transcription(s)
  - Chinese: 翠湖新城
- Logo
- Interactive map of D'Island
- Coordinates: 2°57′30.0″N 101°36′09.9″E
- Country: Malaysia
- State: Selangor
- District: Sepang
- Mukim: Dengkil
- Launched: 2011
- Founder: LBS Bina Berhad

Government
  - Local government: Sepang Municipal Council

Area
  - Total: 71 ha (175 acres)
- Elevation: 10 m (33 ft)
- Time zone: UTC+8 (MST)
  - Summer (DST): Not observed
- Postcode: 47130
- Website: Official website

D'Island (Chinese: 翠湖新城, romanized: Cuì hú xīnchéng) is a 175 acres (71 ha) residential area located in the area of Puchong, Sepang district, Selangor, Malaysia. The residential area was launched in 2011 by LBS Bina Berhad.

The postcode used in D'Island is 47130 Puchong.

== Administration ==
D'Island is located within Mukim Dengkil, which is one of the three mukims in the Sepang district. Apart from that, D'Island is located under the administration of the Sepang Municipal Council (MPSepang), where it is in the Bukit Puchong Zone of MPSepang.

== Transport ==
=== Expressways ===
D'Island is accessible through these 5 main expressways.

- Damansara–Puchong Expressway (LDP)
- Maju Expressway (MEX)
- North–South Expressway Central Link (ELITE)
- South Klang Valley Expressway (SKVE)
- Shah Alam Expressway (KESAS)

=== Public transportation ===
SP29 Puchong Prima LRT station is the closest rail station to D'Island by distance.
