= Pusat =

Pusat may refer to:

== People ==
- Aybüke Pusat (born 1995), Turkish actress, ballet dancer, model and beauty pageant titleholder
- Begüm Pusat (born 2004), Turkish wheelchair basketball player

== Places ==
- Pusat Bandar, Brunei, city centre of Bandar Seri Begawan, the capital of Brunei
- Pusat Bandar Puchong, a township under the Subang Jaya Municipal Council in Puchong, Selangor, Malaysia

== Other uses ==
- Pusat Bandar Damansara MRT station, a mass rapid transit (MRT) station serving the areas of Damansara Town Centre, Damansara Heights and Bangsar in Kuala Lumpur, Malaysia
- Pusat Bandar Puchong LRT station, a light rapid transit station at Puchong Town Centre, in Puchong, Selangor, Malaysia
- Pusat Sains Negara, science centre in Kuala Lumpur, Malaysia
- Pusat Tenaga Ra'ayat, a former political party in Malaysia
- Pusat Tingkatan Enam Berakas, a former government-run sixth form centre in Brunei Darussalam
- SMK Pusat Bandar Puchong (1), a secondary school located in Pusat Bandar Puchong, Selangor, Malaysia
