= Jalan Puchong–Dengkil =

Road in Malaysia

Selangor Route 11
- Jalan Puchong–Dengkil

Major junctions
- North end: Bandar Puteri Puchong
- Damansara–Puchong Expressway
- South end: Cyberjaya, Selangor

Location
- Country: Malaysia
- Primary destinations: Bandar Puteri Puchong, Puchong Utama, Bandar Bukit Puchong, Bandar Bukit Puchong 2, Pulau Meranti, Taman Putra Perdana, Bandar Nusaputra

Highway system
- Highways in Malaysia; Expressways; Federal; State

Jalan Puchong–Dengkil or Jalan Puchong–Cyberjaya (Selangor State Route B11) is a major road in Puchong and Cyberjaya, Selangor, Malaysia.

== Junction lists ==
The entire route is located in Selangor.

Legend:

- I/C - Interchange, I/S - Intersection, RSA - Rest and service area, OBR - Overhead bridge restaurant, R/R - Restaurant and rest plaza, L/B - Layby, V/P - Vista point, TN - tunnel, T/P - Toll plaza, BR - Bridge
- C - Cloverleaf, S - Stack, T-A - Trumpet-A, T-B - Trumpet-B, DT - Directional-T/Y, SDT - Semi-Directional-T/Y, P-Y - Partial-Y, D - Diamond, P-C - Partial cloverleaf, D-D - Diverging diamond, D-R - Direct ramp

District	Location	km	mi	Name	Destinations	Notes
Petaling	Puchong			Puchong Intan Interchange	Damansara–Puchong Expressway – Shah Alam (Persiaran Klang), Alam Megah/HICOM, Subang Jaya / USJ (Persiaran Kewajipan), Puchong, Kajang, Putrajaya, Cyberjaya; North–South Expressway Central Link – Putra Heights, Bandar Saujana Putra, Ipoh, Kuala Lumpur International Airport (KLIA), Johor Bahru	LILO
Petaling	Puchong			Bandar Puteri LRT station	Bandar Puteri LRT station 4	
Petaling	Puchong			Jalan PPU 1/Jalan Industri PBP 1	Jalan Industri PBP 1 – Bandar Puteri Puchong, Taman Perindustrian Puchong Utama, Taman Perindustrian Pusat Bandar Puchong; Jalan PPU 1 – Taman Puchong Perdana	Junctions
Petaling	Puchong			Jalan Bakawali	Jalan Bakawali – Puchong Hartamas, Puchong Hartamas 2	
Petaling	Puchong			Jalan Puchong Batu 14	Jalan Puchong Batu 14 – Batu 14 Puchong. Taman Saujana Puchong	
Petaling	Puchong			Jalan Puchong Utama 2	Jalan Puchong Utama 2 – Puchong Utama 1-5, Taman Perindustrian Puchong Utama	
Petaling	Puchong			Kampung Baru Puchong Interchange	Damansara–Puchong Expressway – Puchong, Subang Jaya / UEP Subang Jaya, Shah Alam, Bandar Sunway, Petaling Jaya / Kelana Jaya, Bandar Utama, Damansara, Kepong, Putrajaya, Cyberjaya, Seri Kembangan, Kajang	Diamond interchange
Petaling	Puchong			Jalan Puchong Utama 3	Jalan Puchong Utama 3 – Puchong Utama bus terminal, Aeon Big Puchong Utama	LILO Northbound
Petaling	Puchong			Jalan BP 7/16	Jalan BP 7/16 – Bandar Bukit Puchong 1	
Petaling	Puchong			Lebuh Bukit Puchong	Lebuh Bukit Puchong – Bandar Bukit Puchong 1, Bandar Bukit Puchong 2, Tesco Bandar Bukit Puchong	T-junctions
Sepang	Cyberjaya			Lingkaran Putra Prima	Lingkaran Putra Prima – Tanming Boulevard, Puchong Utama 9-10, Taman Tasik Prima, Taman Puchong Tekali, Kampung Seri Aman, Taman Putra Prima, Taman Mas Sepang, Koi Prima, Putra Industrial Park, Kampung Lombong, Bandar Saujana Putra	T-junctions
Sepang	Cyberjaya			Jalan Meranti Jaya	Jalan Meranti Jaya – Taman Meranti Jaya, Taman Putra Impiana	
Sepang	Cyberjaya			Jalan Meranti Permai	Jalan Meranti Permai – Taman Tasik Puchong, Taman Meranti Permai, Taman Desa Ayer Hitam	
Sepang	Cyberjaya			Jalan Pulau Meranti	Jalan Pulau Meranti – Pulau Meranti, Bandar Bukit Puchong 2, 16 Sierra	
Sepang	Cyberjaya			South Klang Valley Expressway Bridge		
Sepang	Cyberjaya			Jalan Putra Perdana 3A	Jalan Putra Perdana 3A and 5A – LBS Skylake Residences, Anggerik Apartment, Putra Perdana Community Center	
Sepang	Cyberjaya			Jalan Putra Perdana 5C	Jalan Putra Perdana 5C – Bulatan Putra Perdana, Masjid Putra Perdana, Majlis Perbandaran Sepang Puchong Branch	
Sepang	Cyberjaya			Jalan Putra Perdana 6A	Jalan Putra Perdana 6A – Ruvena Villa Apartment, SK Putra Perdana 2	
Sepang	Cyberjaya			Jalan Putra Perdana 6B	Jalan Putra Perdana 6B – Bandar Nusaputra, Taman Amanputra	
Sepang	Cyberjaya			Bandar Nusaputra Interchange	Putrajaya Link – Setia Eco Glades, Cyberjaya, Putrajaya; North–South Expressway Central Link / AH2 – Ipoh, Shah Alam, UEP Subang Jaya, Bandar Saujana Putra, Kuala Lumpur International Airport (KLIA) , Seremban, Malacca, Johor Bahru	Cloverleaf interchange
Sepang	Cyberjaya			Continue as Persiaran Sepang		
1.000 mi = 1.609 km; 1.000 km = 0.621 mi: Incomplete access; Route transition
