= Damansara–Puchong Expressway =

Highway in Selangor, Malaysia

Expressway 11
- Damansara–Puchong Expressway; Lebuhraya Damansara–Puchong 蒲种–白沙罗大道
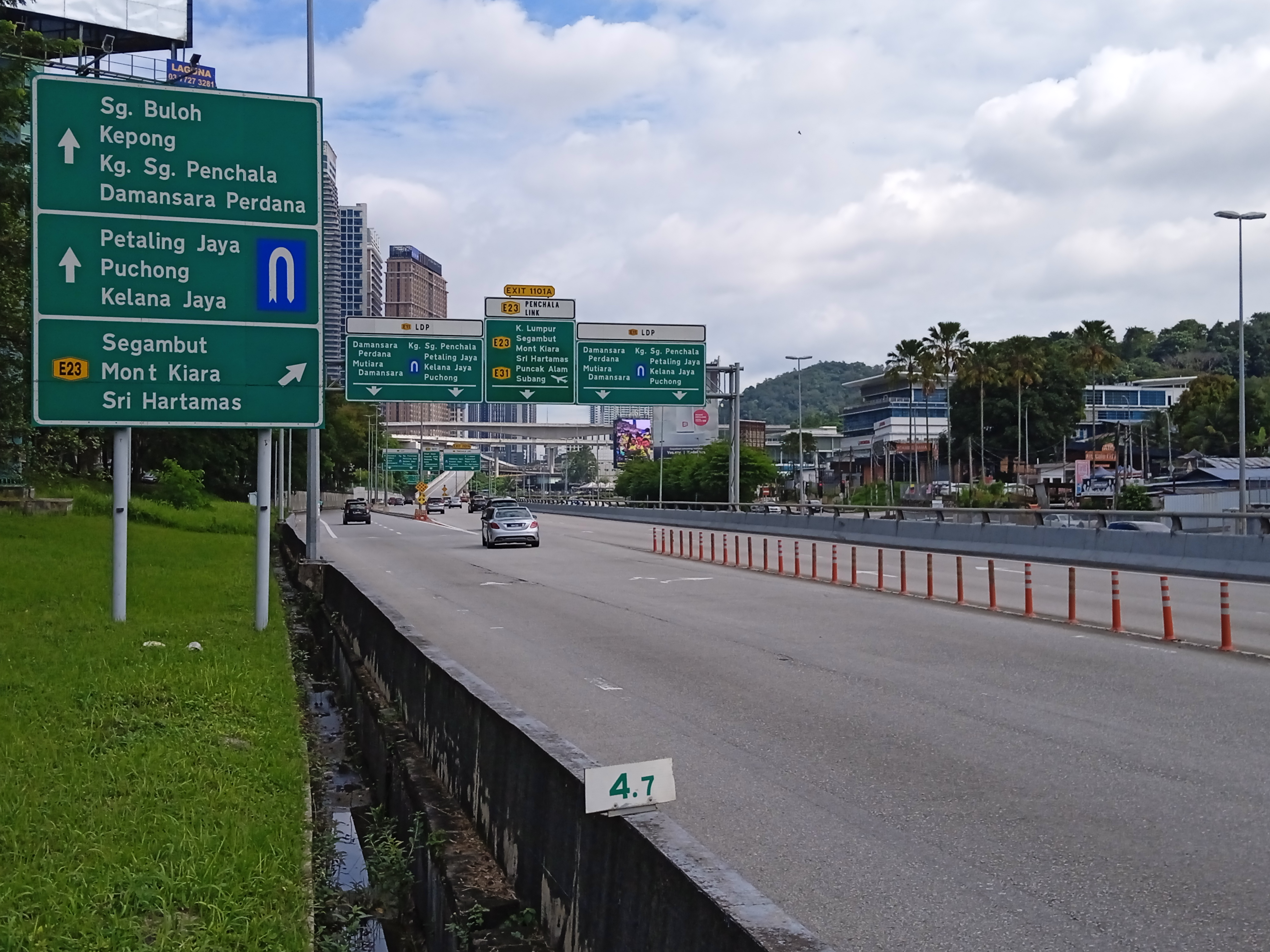

Route information
- Maintained by Lingkaran Trans Kota Holdings Bhd
- Length: 40.0 km (24.9 mi) Main route: 32.5 km (20.2 mi); Puchong West link: 7.5 km (4.7 mi)
- Existed: 1997–present
- History: Completed in December 1998 and opened to public in January 1999

Major junctions
- North end: FT 54 Sungai Buloh Highway and FT 28 Kuala Lumpur Middle Ring Road 2 at Bandar Sri Damansara, Selangor
- Sprint Expressway; Damansara–Shah Alam Elevated Expressway; FT 2 Federal Highway; Shah Alam Expressway; B11 Jalan Puchong–Petaling Jaya; FT 217 Bukit Jalil Highway; FT 3214 Shah Alam–Puchong Highway; FT 3215 Jalan Seri Kembangan
- South end: FT 29 Putrajaya–Cyberjaya Expressway at Putra Permai, Selangor

Location
- Country: Malaysia
- Primary destinations: Bukit Lanjan, Damansara Perdana, Mutiara Damansara, Bandar Utama, Taman Tun Dr Ismail, Kelana Jaya, Bandar Sunway, Subang Jaya, Petaling Jaya, Puchong, UEP Subang Jaya, Sungai Besi, Shah Alam, Putrajaya, Cyberjaya

Highway system
- Highways in Malaysia; Expressways; Federal; State

The E11 Damansara–Puchong Expressway (Malay: Lebuhraya Damansara–Puchong; Chinese: 蒲种–白沙罗大道), abbreviated as LDP, is a 40.0-kilometre (24.9-mile) major controlled-access highway in the Petaling District of Selangor, Malaysia. The expressway runs in a north–south direction between Bandar Sri Damansara and Putra Permai, near Putrajaya, forming a major thoroughfare in the cities of Petaling Jaya and Puchong. A short east–west spur of the expressway connects Pusat Bandar Puchong to the suburb of UEP Subang Jaya.

== Route description ==
The Damansara–Puchong Expressway begins at the interchange with the Sungai Buloh Highway and Kuala Lumpur Middle Ring Road 2.

The Kelana Jaya line, Kajang line and Sri Petaling line runs alongside substantial portions of the expressway.

== History ==
The construction of the Damansara–Puchong Expressway was awarded to Lingkaran Trans Kota Holdings Bhd (Litrak). On 23 April 1996, the concession agreement was signed between the Government of Malaysia and Litrak for the privatisation of the improvement, upgrading, design, construction, maintenance, operations and management of Damansara–Puchong Expressway.

Construction of the expressway began in September 1996 and completed in December 1998. The work was awarded on a turnkey basis (i.e. design and construct) to Gamuda–Irama Duta Joint Venture (GIDJV) at a cost of RM 1.1 billion. The overall cost for expressway is RM 1.4 billion. The expressway was opened to traffic on 25 January 1999.

With the completion of the Damansara–Puchong Expressway, the Kuala Lumpur Middle Ring Road 2 was substantially completed on the west of Kuala Lumpur which provides for free flow and ease congestion. It also links Bandar Sunway to Puchong and traveling time is shortened between Petaling Jaya and Puchong. The expressways connects the Putrajaya and Hicom/Shah Alam with the Middle Ring Road.

The expressway used to have its own electronic toll collection system known as the "FasTrak". From 1 July 2004, the FasTrak was replaced by the Touch 'n Go and SmartTAG systems.

=== Original routes ===
The construction of the Damansara–Puchong Expressway includes the acquisition and upgrades of several major roads as follows:

Highway shield	Roads	Sections
	Jalan Sungai Penchala	Bukit Lanjan–Kampung Sungai Penchala
	Jalan Damansara	Sri Damansara–Taman Tun Dr Ismail
	Jalan Perbandaran	Taman Tun Dr Ismail–Federal Highway
	Jalan Sungei Way	Federal Highway–Bandar Sunway
	Jalan PJS Utama	Bandar Sunway–PJS
B11	Jalan Puchong–Petaling Jaya	Puchong Jaya–Puchong Intan
FT 286	Jalan Puchong–Shah Alam	Puchong Intan–Subang Jaya South
	Jalan Puchong Perdana	Jalan Puchong–Shah Alam–Jalan Puchong–Seri Kembangan
FT 3215	Jalan Puchong–Seri Kembangan	Puchong Perdana–Serdang

== Developments ==
=== Puchong Jaya interchange ===
The upgrading works of the Puchong Jaya interchange including ramp from Bukit Jalil Highway to the expressway began in 2002 and was completed in 2005.

=== Kelana Jaya and Kampung Baru Puchong interchanges ===
The Kelana Jaya interchange which used to be a U-turn junction was completed in 2007.

The Kampung Baru Puchong interchange was upgraded from underpass to diamond interchange was completed in 2007.

=== TTDI interchange ===
The TTDI interchange upgrading project is being undertaken by Lingkaran Trans Kota Holdings Bhd (Litrak) to improve the level of service on LDP.

The project which commenced in August 2007 with a total budget of RM133 million involves widening of certain stretches and building a flyover and an underpass at TTDI Interchange.

The congestion at the interchange is mainly due to multiple weaving of traffic from TTDI to Bandar Utama, TTDI to Damansara Utama and Damansara Utama to TTDI. Once completed, the upgraded interchange will ease traffic flow from TTDI to Bandar Utama/Kepong and there will also be smoother flow on the LDP mainline to Bandar Utama and Kepong.

The upgraded interchange will also allow more green time for localized traffic movement.

The project work involved the following:

- Upgrading of existing TTDI Interchange into a fully grade-separated Interchange through the construction of a new 2-lane bridge flyover for northbound traffic towards Kepong
- Localised widening of northbound and southbound slip roads
- An underpass from TTDI to Bandar Utama and Kepong.

The project was scheduled for full completion in May 2011 with the flyover expected to be opened earlier upon its completion.

== Features ==
- A notable feature of the expressway is the LDP Cable-Stayed Bridge on the Freescale Interchange, the first cable-stayed land bridge in Malaysia.
- The elevated Sungai Buloh–Kajang MRT line from Mutiara Damansara to Taman Tun Dr Ismail

LDP Cable-Stayed Bridge Jambatan LDP Freescale
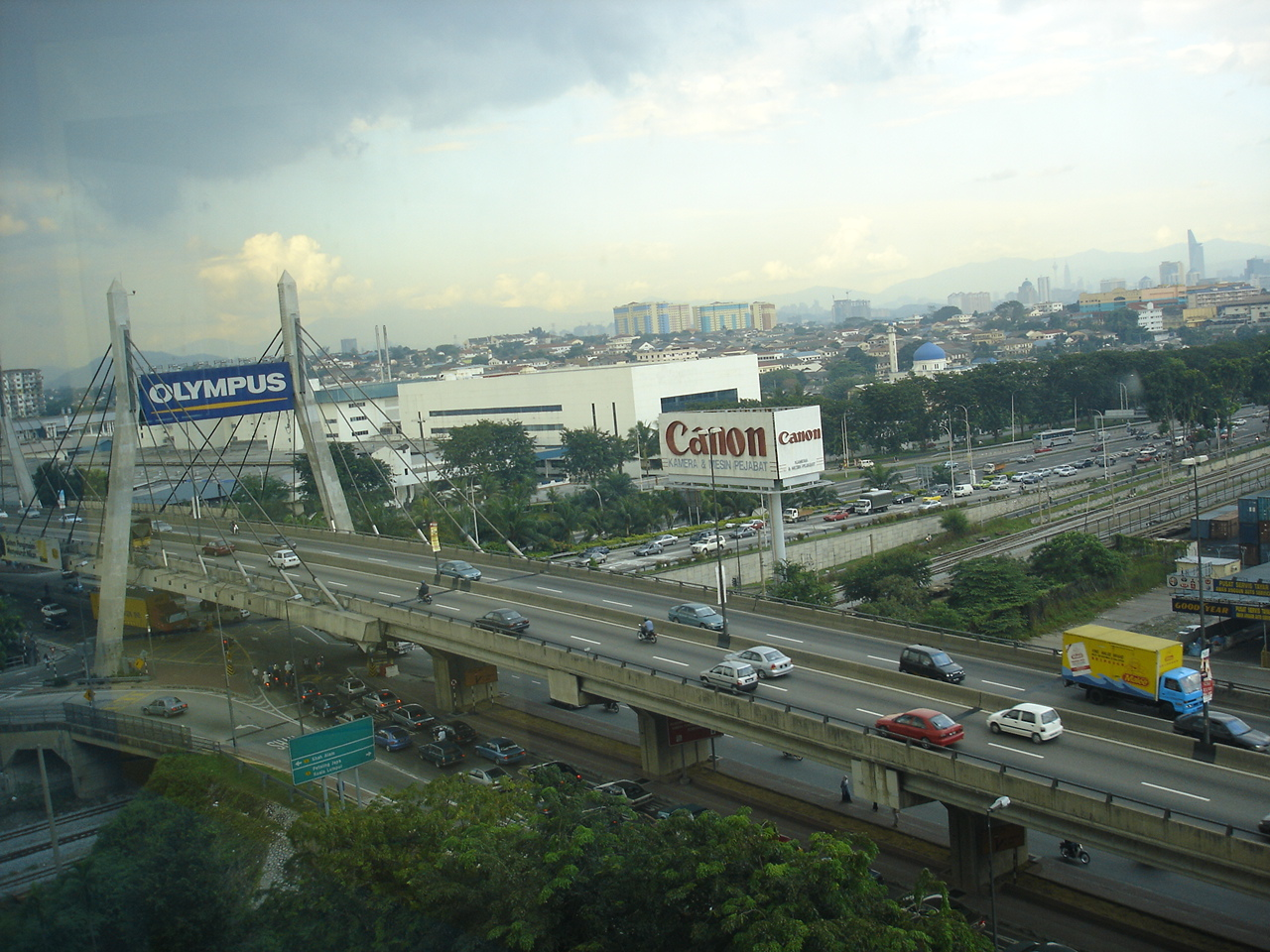
- Carries: Motor vehicles
- Crosses: Federal Highway
- Locale: Damansara–Puchong Expressway
- Official name: Freescale LDP Bridge
- Maintained by: Lingkaran Trans Kota Holdings Bhd (Litrak)

Characteristics
- Design: cable stayed bridge
- Total length: 1.1 km
- Width: --
- Longest span: --

History
- Designer: Malaysian Highway Authority (LLM); Gamuda Berhad
- Constructed by: Gamuda Berhad
- Opened: 1999

== Notable incidents ==
- 1 August 2013 – Chua Boon Huat, Malaysia's national hockey player died in a car accident on Damansara–Puchong Expressway near Kelana Jaya LRT station at Kelana Jaya.

== Tolls ==
There are in total 4 toll booths along Damansara–Puchong Expressway (namely the Penchala, PJS, Puchong West and Puchong South Toll Plazas), all of which are adopting opened toll systems.

=== Electronic Toll Collections (ETC) ===
As part of an initiative to facilitate faster transactions, all toll transactions at four toll plazas on the Damansara–Puchong Expressway have been conducted electronically via Touch 'n Go cards or SmartTAGs since 9 November 2016.

Some of the booths were upgraded with RFID infrastructure in 2020 that provides convenience to users who has already installed a RFID tag on the vehicle front and also completed a linking procedure in their smart phone's TnG eWallet app.

In March 2023, most of the booths with Touch 'n Go option has been upgraded with a sensor to accept payment by credit card/debit card (Visa and Mastercard), a feat that was not common among established highways (Some highway only upgrades 1 or 2 lanes with the bank card option, like SILK Highway).

Similar to the payment using a TnG card, user only needs to place the bank card with sufficient account balance near the scanner at the toll booth for few seconds before the toll fare is debited on the card (the LED display would display "Terima Kasih!" instead of the account balance, similar to RFID payment.)

=== Toll rates ===
(As of 15 October 2015)

Class	Type of vehicles	Rate (in Malaysian Ringgit (RM))
0	Motorcycles, bicycles or vehicles with 2 or less wheels	Free
1	Vehicles with 2 axles and 3 or 4 wheels excluding taxis	RM2.10
2	Vehicles with 2 axles and 5 or 6 wheels excluding buses	RM4.20
3	Vehicles with 3 or more axles	RM6.30
4	Taxis	RM1.10
5	Buses	RM1.60

=== Toll names ===
Abbreviation	Name
PCL	Penchala
PJS	Petaling Jaya South
PCS	Puchong South
PCB	Puchong West

== Interchange lists ==
The entire route is located in Petaling District, Selangor.

Legend:

- I/C - Interchange, I/S - Intersection, RSA - Rest and service area, OBR - Overhead bridge restaurant, R/R - Restaurant and rest plaza, L/B - Layby, V/P - Vista point, TN - tunnel, T/P - Toll plaza, BR - Bridge
- C - Cloverleaf, S - Stack, T-A - Trumpet-A, T-B - Trumpet-B, DT - Directional-T/Y, SDT - Semi-Directional-T/Y, P-Y - Partial-Y, D - Diamond, P-C - Partial cloverleaf, D-D - Diverging diamond, D-R - Direct ramp

=== Main link ===
Location	km	mi	Exit	Name	Destinations	Notes
Bandar Sri Damansara	0.0	0.0	1101A	Sri Damansara I/C	Persiaran Utama – Bandar Sri Damansara, Kepong Industrial Area; FT 54 Sungai Buloh Highway – Sungai Buloh, Puncak Alam, Kuala Selangor; North–South Expressway Northern Route / AH2 – Alor Setar, Penang, Ipoh, Rawang, KLIA, Johor Bahru; FT 28 FT 54 Kuala Lumpur Middle Ring Road 2 – Bandar Manjalara, Kepong, Batu Caves, Kuala Lumpur, Selayang, Genting Highlands, Kuantan	Multi-level half-SPUI; off-ramp to FT28 MRR2
Bandar Sri Damansara			Penchala Layby (Northbound)			
Bandar Sri Damansara	0.8	0.50	–	Bandar Sri Damansara/Bandar Manjalara Exit	Persiaran Ara – Bandar Sri Damansara; Jalan 1/62B – Bandar Manjalara	LILO exit
Bandar Sri Damansara	1.0	0.62	–			
Bukit Lanjan	1.9	1.2	Penchala Toll Plaza			
Bukit Lanjan	2.0	1.2	–			
Bukit Lanjan	4.0	2.5	–	Kampung Bukit Lanjan Exit	Kampung Bukit Lanjan	From north only
Bukit Lanjan			1101B	Penchala I/C	1101B (diamond); Jalan PJU 8/1 – Bukit Lanjan, Damansara Perdana, Desa Temuan; 1101C; Damansara–Shah Alam Elevated Expressway – Puncak Alam, Puncak Perdana, Subang, Sungai Buloh, Kota Damansara; Jalan Damansara – Kampung Sungai Penchala; Jalan PJU 7/9 – Mutiara Damansara, The Curve IKEA; 1101A (east); Sprint Expressway (Penchala Link) – TTDI, Mont Kiara, Sri Hartamas, Jalan Duta, Segambut, Ampang	Stacked expressway interchange with small diverging diamond
Bandar Utama	5.0	3.1	–	Persiaran Surian Exit	Persiaran Surian – Mutiara Damansara, Kota Damansara, Sungai Buloh, The Curve, IKEA; Mutiara Damansara MRT ( 9 )	From south only
Bandar Utama			–	1 Utama parking ramps	1 Utama (parking)	Under planning
Bandar Utama			1103	Bandar Utama I/C	Lebuh Bandar Utama – Bandar Utama, 1 Utama; Jalan Burhanuddin Helmi – Taman Tun Dr Ismail	Diamond interchange
Bandar Utama			–	Bandar Utama MRT & LRT Station (P&R)	P&R Bandar Utama MRT & LRT Station – 9 Kajang Line; 11 Shah Alam Line	
Bandar Utama			–	Persiaran Bandar Utama Exit	Persiaran Bandar Utama – Bandar Utama; Sri Pentas (TV3)	From south only
Bandar Utama			Sungai Kayu Ara bridge			
Bandar Utama			–	Jalan Leong Yew Koh Exit	Jalan Leong Yew Koh – TTDI, Masjid Al Taqwa	From north only
Damansara			1104	TTDI I/C	Jalan Damansara – TTDI; Sprint Expressway (Damansara Link) – Petaling Jaya, Kuala Lumpur	Interchange; one underpass from Jalan Damansara to LDP
Damansara	7.0	4.3	–			
Damansara			–	Damansara Utama Exit	Jalan SS 21/56 – Damansara Utama, Damansara Uptown	From south only
Damansara	7.5	4.7	1106	Damansara Utama I/C	Sprint Expressway (Damansara Link) – Kampung Sungai Kayu Ara, Tropicana Golf & Country Club, Bukit Kiara, Damansara Town Centre, Kuala Lumpur, Tropicana City Mall New Klang Valley Expressway / AH2 / AH141 – Ipoh, Kota Damansara, Subang, Klang, Johor Bahru	Multi-level stacked interchange
Damansara	8.0	5.0	–			
Damansara			–	Damansara Hindu Cemetery		
Damansara			–	Damansara Jaya Exit	Jalan SS 22/41 – Damansara Jaya, Kolej Damansara Utama (KDU)	From south only
Damansara			–	Jalan SS 2/75 Exit	Jalan SS 2/75 – SS 2, Sea Park	From north only
Damansara	9.0	5.6	–			
Damansara			–	Jalan SS 22/48 Exit	Jalan SS 22/48 – Damansara Jaya	From south only
Damansara	9.5	5.9	1107	SS 2 I/C	Jalan SS 2/55 – SS 2, Sea Park	Half-diamond interchange
Damansara			–	Jalan SS 23/13 Exit	Jalan SS 23/13 – Taman Megah	From south only
Damansara			1108	Taman Megah I/C	Jalan SS 24/9 – Taman Megah; Jalan SS 2/3 – Taman Bahagia	Diamond interchange
Damansara	10.0	6.2	–			
Damansara			–	Jalan SS 23/8 Exit	Jalan SS 23/8 – Damansara Jaya	From south only
Petaling Jaya			–	Kelana Jaya LRT (P&R)	Kelana Jaya LRT station – parking; ( 5 )	From north only
Petaling Jaya			–	Jalan SS 25/23 Exit	Jalan SS 25/23 – Taman Mayang Emas, Tropicana; Lincoln University College	From south only
Petaling Jaya			–	Jalan SS 25/29 Exit	Jalan SS 25/29 – shortcut to Ara Damansara, Lembah Subang LRT Depot	From south only
Petaling Jaya			–	Jalan SS 4B/10 Exit	Jalan SS 4B/10	From north only
Petaling Jaya	13.0	8.1	–			
Petaling Jaya			–	Jalan SS 7/26 Exit	Jalan SS 7/26	Northbound
Petaling Jaya			–	Kelana Jaya I/C	Jalan SS 7/19 – Paradigm Mall (parking); Jalan Bahagia – Kelana Jaya	Half diamond interchange
Petaling Jaya			–	Jalan SS 7/26 Exit (aux)	Jalan SS 7/26 – Kelana Centrepoint, Kelana Business Park; Paradigm Mall (parking)	Northbound
Petaling Jaya			Shell Layby (Both directions)			
Petaling Jaya			–	Giant Hypermarket Kelana Jaya	Southbound – parking	
Petaling Jaya			–	Jalan SS 6/2 Exit	Jalan SS 6/2 – Kelana Jaya food court, post office	Southbound
Petaling Jaya			Kelana Jaya Recreational Park (Northbound)			
Petaling Jaya			–	MPOB	Malaysian Palm Oil Board HQ	Southbound
Petaling Jaya			–	Yamaha (Malaysia) HQ		Southbound
Petaling Jaya			–	Jalan SS 7/9 Exit	Jalan SS 7/9 – Subang, Kelana Jaya Recreational Park, MBPJ Stadium, Tengku Kelana Jaya Putera Mosque	Northbound
Petaling Jaya			–	Jalan SS 5/1 Exit	Jalan SS 5/1 – Royal Malaysian Customs HQ, Tabung Haji pilgrims complex	Southbound
Petaling Jaya			–	SS 7 Exit	Jalan SS 7/9	Northbound
Petaling Jaya	15.0	9.3	1110	Jalan Majlis I/C	Jalan Majlis – Kelana Jaya; Tabung Haji pilgrims complex Majlis Link – Duty Free Trade Zone; FT 2 Federal Highway – Subang Jaya, Shah Alam, Klang	Diamond interchange
Petaling Jaya			–	SS 3 Exit	Jalan SS 3/29	Southbound
Petaling Jaya	16.0	9.9	–	SS 8 Exit	Jalan SS 8/39	Southbound
Petaling Jaya			LDP cable-stayed bridge (1.1 km)			
Petaling Jaya	16.4	10.2	1111	Freescale I/C	FT 2 Federal Highway – Subang Jaya, Shah Alam, Klang, Kuala Lumpur, Petaling Jaya	Multi-level diverging diamond interchange
Petaling Jaya	17.0	10.6	–	LDP cable-stayed bridge (1.1 km) /Jalan PJS 8/9 – Jalan Klang Lama Exit	Jalan PJS 8/9 – Mentari Court, Leisure Commerce Square; FT 2 Jalan Klang Lama – Taman Dato' Harun	Start/end of bridge
Petaling Jaya	17.5	10.9	1112	PJS I/C	New Pantai Expressway – Bandar Sunway, Subang Jaya, Petaling Jaya, Jalan Klang Lama, Bangsar	Multi-level single-point urban interchange
Petaling Jaya			–	Jalan Lagun Selatan I/C	Jalan Lagun Selatan – Bandar Sunway	From south only
Petaling Jaya			–	PJS 7 / PJS 9 I/C	PJS 7, PJS 9 – Bandar Sunway	Trumpet interchange
Petaling Jaya			Petaling Jaya South Toll Plaza and LITRAK HQ/ops (Northbound)			
Petaling Jaya			Petaling Jaya South Layby (both bound; separated)			
Petaling Jaya	19.7	12.2	Sungai Klang bridge			
Puchong	19.9	12.4	1113	Sunway I/C	Shah Alam Expressway – Pulau Indah (port), Klang, Shah Alam, Sungai Besi, Kuala Lumpur, Kompleks Sukan Negara, Ampang, Cheras, Kuantan	Cloverleaf interchange with ramp from SAE to LDP
Puchong	20.0	12.4	–			
Puchong			1114	Puchong Jaya I/C	B11 Jalan Puchong–Petaling Jaya – Jalan Klang Lama, Kinrara, Petaling Jaya; FT 217 Bukit Jalil Highway – Bandar Kinrara, Sungai Besi, Kompleks Sukan Negara, Technology Park Malaysia	Multi-level stacked interchange
Puchong			–	Bandar Puchong Jaya Exit	Persiaran Puchong Jaya Selatan – Bandar Puchong Jaya	From north only
Puchong			–	IOI Mall	IOI Mall (parking)	From south only
Puchong			–	IOI Mall I/C	U-turn: North – Petaling Jaya; South – Putrajaya; IOI Mall (parking)	U-turn interchange
Puchong			Tesco Puchong (layby)			
Puchong			–	Taman Wawasan Exit	Persiaran Wawasan – Taman Wawasan	From north only
Puchong			–	Taman Industri Puchong I/C	Taman Industri Puchong; U-turn (North: Petaling Jaya)	U-turn interchange
Puchong			–	Bandar Puteri I/C	Lebuh Puteri – Bandar Puteri Puchong	Half-diamond interchange
Puchong			–	Pekan Batu 14 Puchong Exit	B15 Jalan Puchong–Dengkil – Pekan Batu 14 Puchong	From north only
Puchong			–	Kompleks Rakan Muda Puchong		
Puchong			1118	Puchong Intan I/C	Damansara–Puchong Expressway (Puchong West link) – USJ, Subang Jaya, Hicom, Shah Alam; North–South Expressway Central Link / AH2 – Ipoh, Kuala Lumpur, Klang, KLIA, Johor Bahru	Expressway trumpet interchange; special directional ramp to Putrajaya
Puchong			1119	Puchong Perdana I/C	Puchong Perdana, Puchong Indah	Diamond interchange
Puchong			–	Puchong Indah Exit	Jalan Puchong Indah – Puchong Indah	From south only
Puchong	30.0	18.6	–	Kampung Baru Puchong I/C	B15 Jalan Puchong–Dengkil – Pekan Batu 9 Puchong, Dengkil	Diamond interchange
Puchong			1121	Bukit Puchong I/C	Bandar Bukit Puchong	Half-diamond interchange
Puchong	32.0	19.9	–			
Puchong			Puchong South Layby			
Puchong			Puchong South Toll Plaza			
Puchong			Puchong South Toll Plaza (aux, southbound)			
Puchong			Bridge			
Puchong			–	Puchong Gateway Exit	Puchong Gateway; McDonald's drive-thru (parking)	From north only
Puchong			Ayer Hitam Layby (Northbound)			
Putra Permai			Sungai Rasau bridge			
Putra Permai			1123	Serdang I/C	Persiaran Alpina – D'Alpina, 16 Sierra; FT 3215 Jalan Seri Kembangan – Bandar Putra Permai, Serdang, Seri Kembangan, Universiti Putra Malaysia (UPM)	Diamond interchange
Putra Permai			Through to FT 29 Putrajaya–Cyberjaya Expressway			
1.000 mi = 1.609 km; 1.000 km = 0.621 mi: Electronic toll collection; Proposed; Incomplete access; Route transition

=== Puchong West link ===
Location	km	mi	Exit	Name	Destinations	Notes
Pusat Bandar Puchong			1118	Puchong Intan I/C	Damansara–Puchong Expressway (Main Link) – Sungai Besi, Petaling Jaya, Damansara, Kepong, Putrajaya, Cyberjaya, KLIA, Sepang	Trumpet interchange
Pusat Bandar Puchong			–	Taman Desa Puchong Exit	Jalan Sri Puchong 1 – Taman Desa Puchong	Eastbound
Pusat Bandar Puchong			Puchong West Toll Plaza			
Pusat Bandar Puchong			–	Batu 13 Puchong East Exit	Kampung Bersatu, Kampung Seri Puchong	Eastbound
Pusat Bandar Puchong			Sungai Klang bridge			
UEP Subang Jaya			–	Batu 13 Puchong West Exit	Kampung Kenangan, Kampung Perahu, Kampung Tengah	Westbound
UEP Subang Jaya			–	Persiaran Subang Damai Exit	Persiaran Subang Damai – USJ 22, USJ 22 Muslim Cemetery	Eastbound
UEP Subang Jaya			–	Persiaran Harmoni I/C	Persiaran Harmoni – USJ 26–27, Putra Heights, Bukit Lanchong	Trumpet interchange
UEP Subang Jaya			Shell Layby (Westbound) – fuel, parking			
UEP Subang Jaya	0.2– 0.4	0.12– 0.25	1125	Subang Jaya (South) I/C	From/To One City; From/To Persiaran Kewajipan – USJ, Subang Jaya	Trumpet interchange
UEP Subang Jaya	0.1	0.062	–	Sri Maha Mariamman Hindu Temple (USJ)		
UEP Subang Jaya	0.0	0.0	–	Jalan Usaha Exit	Jalan Usaha – Persiaran Tujuan, USJ 16–17	Eastbound; light vehicles only; max height 2.1 m
UEP Subang Jaya			Through to FT 286 Malaysia Federal Route 286			
1.000 mi = 1.609 km; 1.000 km = 0.621 mi: Electronic toll collection; Incomplete access; Route transition

== Gallery ==
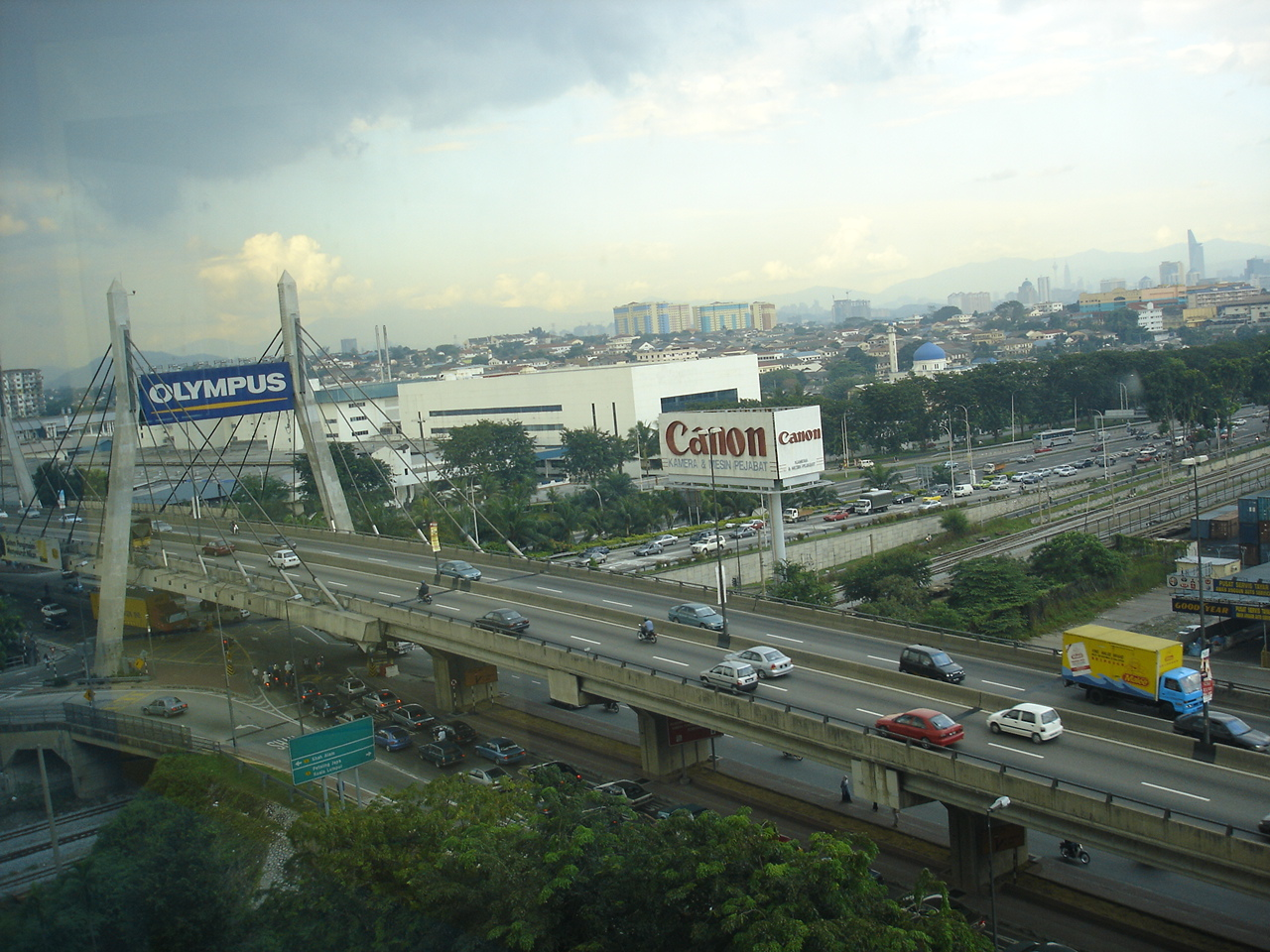
The cable-stayed bridge of Damansara–Puchong Expressway spanning over its intersection with Federal Highway in Petaling Jaya. Kuala Lumpur can be seen in the distant background on the right corner of the picture.

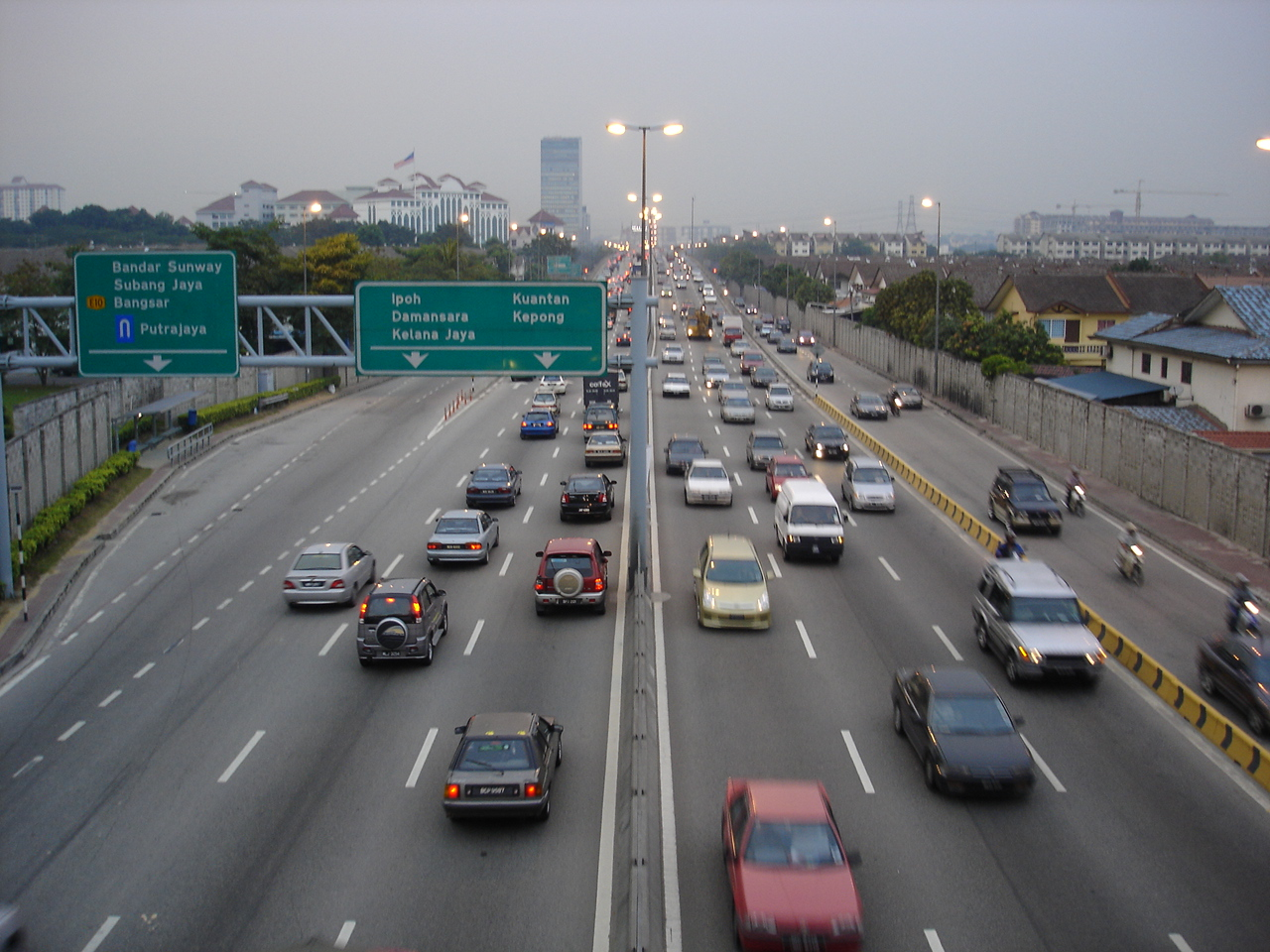
The Sunway stretch of Damansara–Puchong Expressway during the evening rush hour.

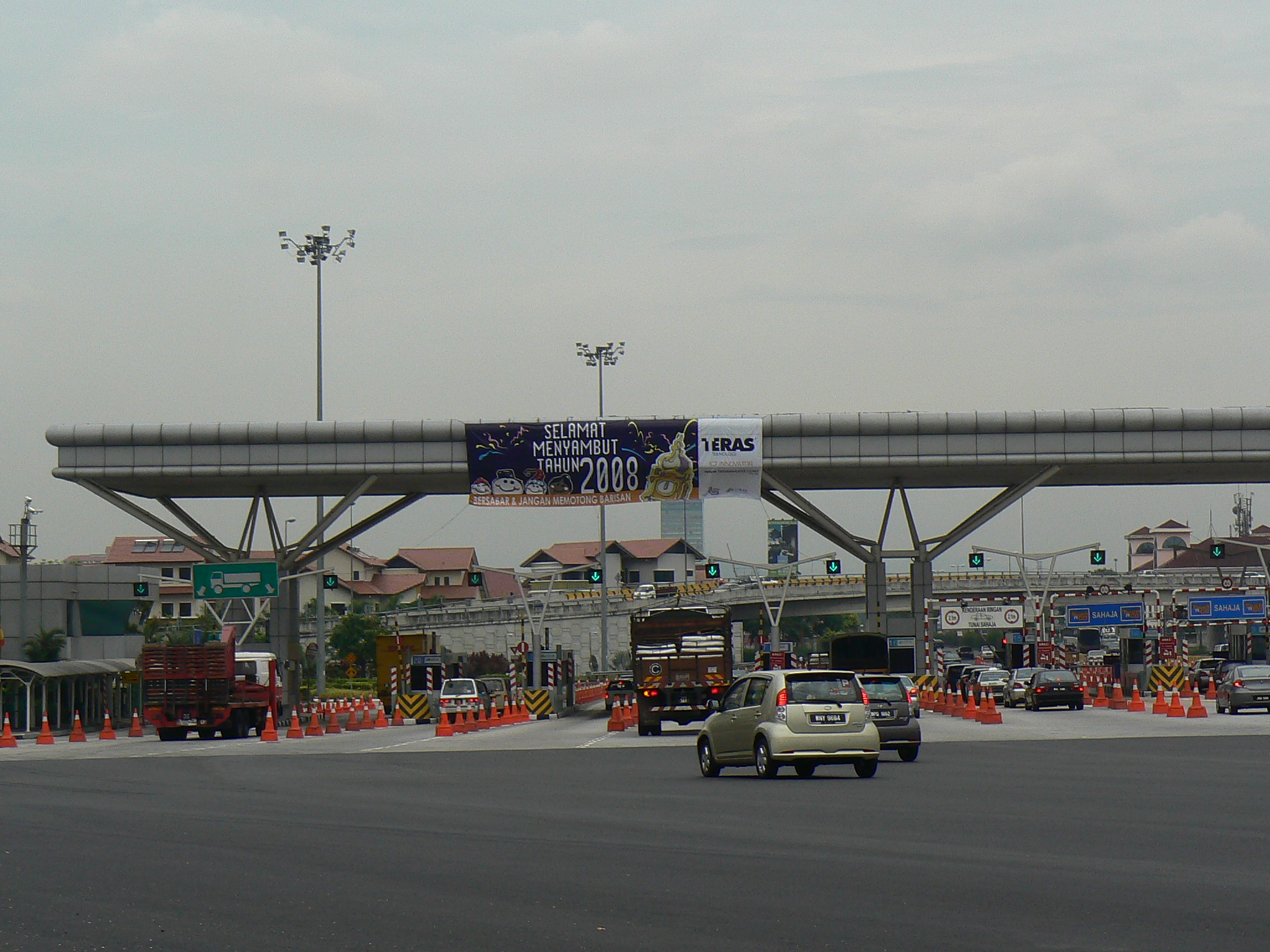
Petaling Jaya toll plaza of trip from Puchong to Petaling Jaya. The modern design is LDP standard design of toll plazas with electronic toll collection of cash lanes and Touch 'n Go lanes seen here. The SmartTAG lanes immediately next to Touch n Go lanes.

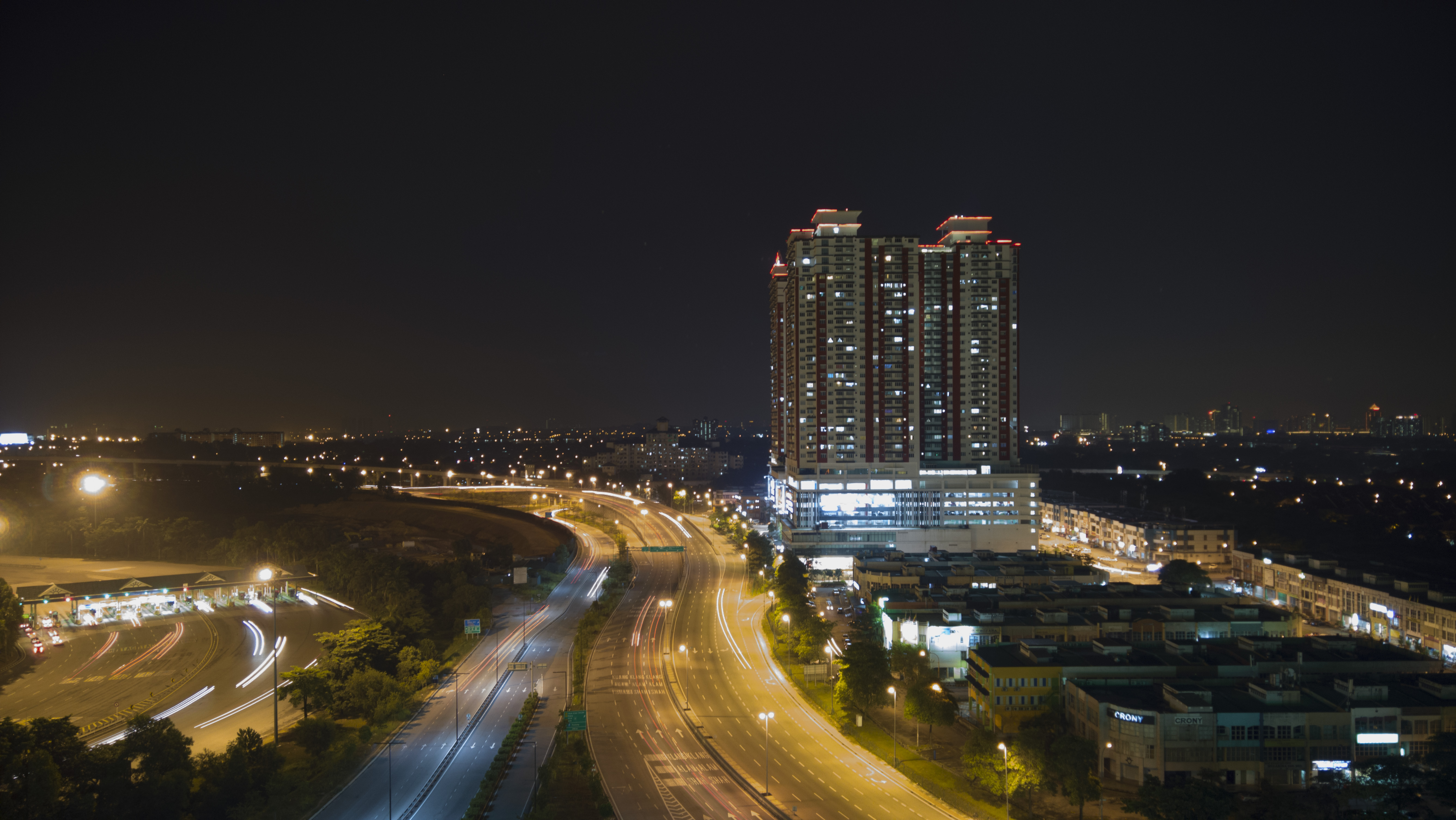
LDP Terminus at USJ.

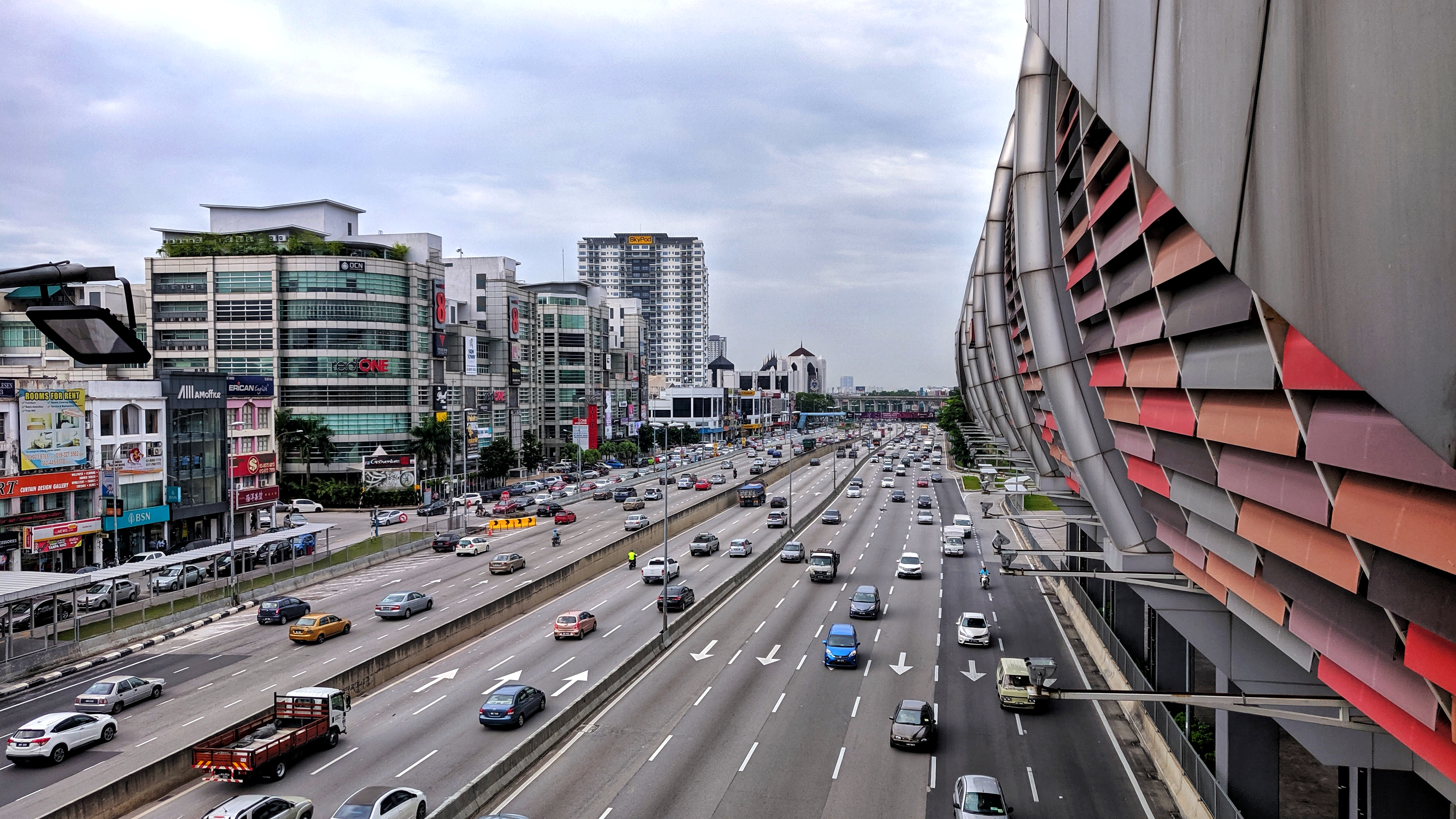
LDP highway Puchong portion, which has grown notoriously for traffic congestion.

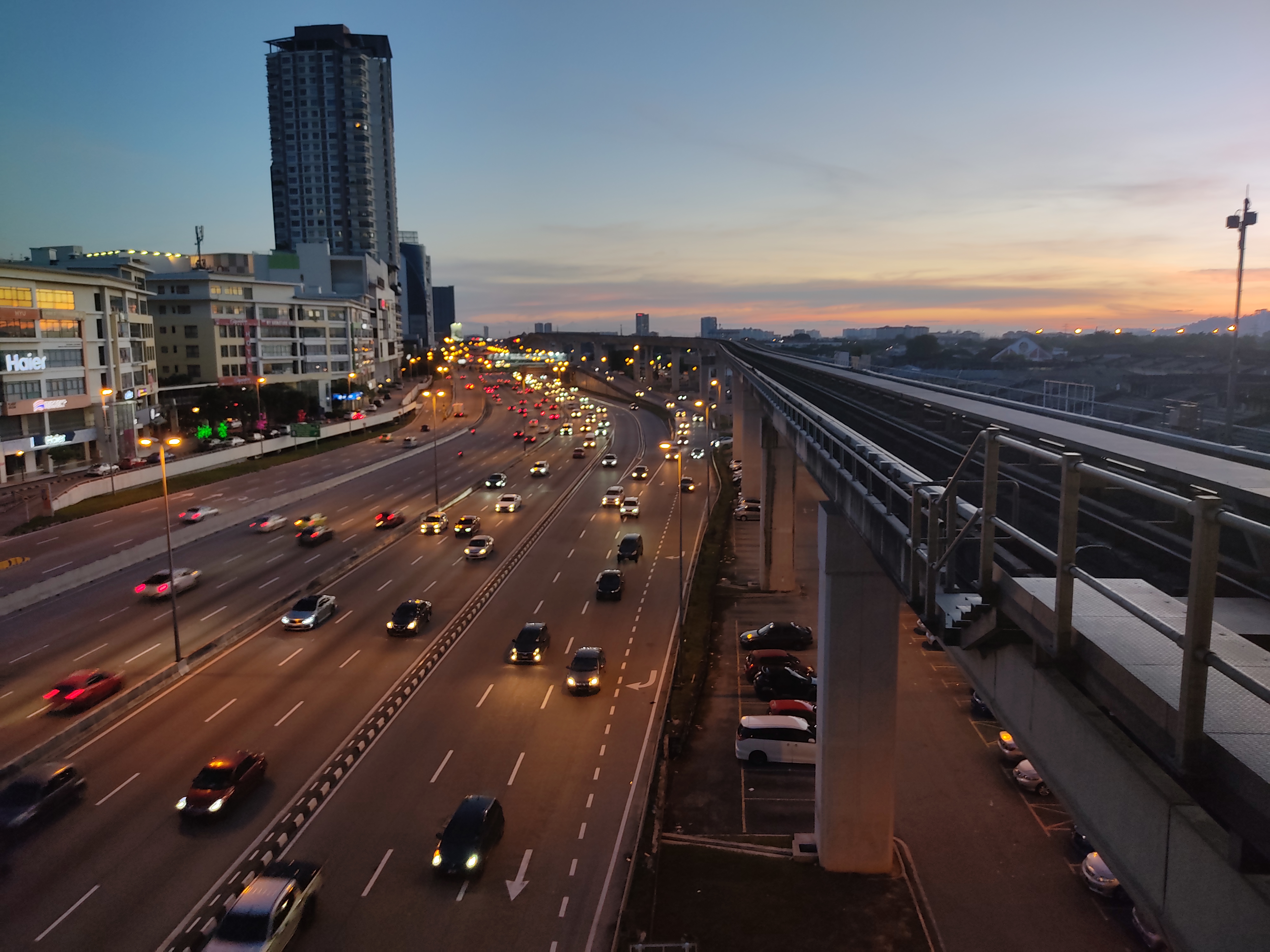
LDP Puchong portion at night.

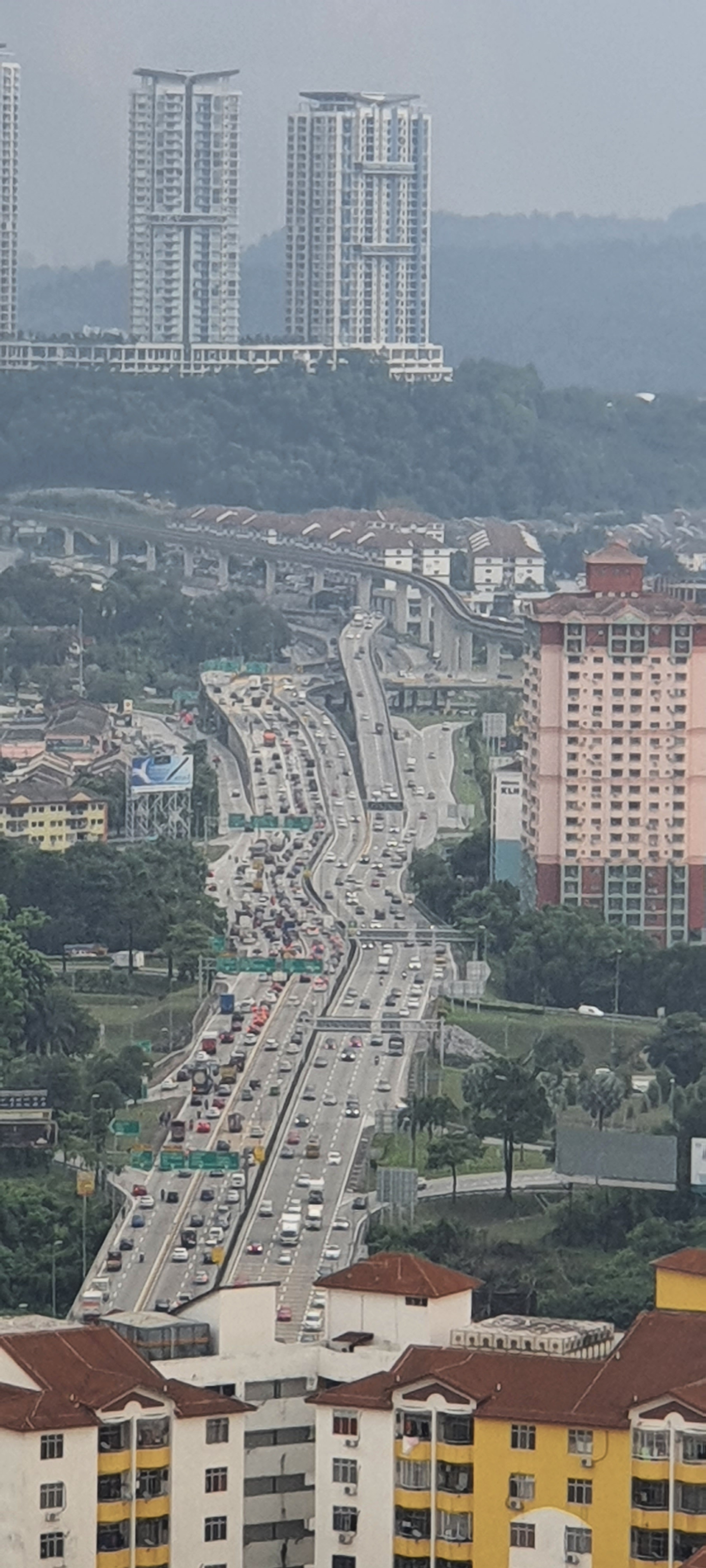
The stretch of LDP between KESAS interchange and Jalan Puchong interchange.

LDP section near Kelana Jaya.

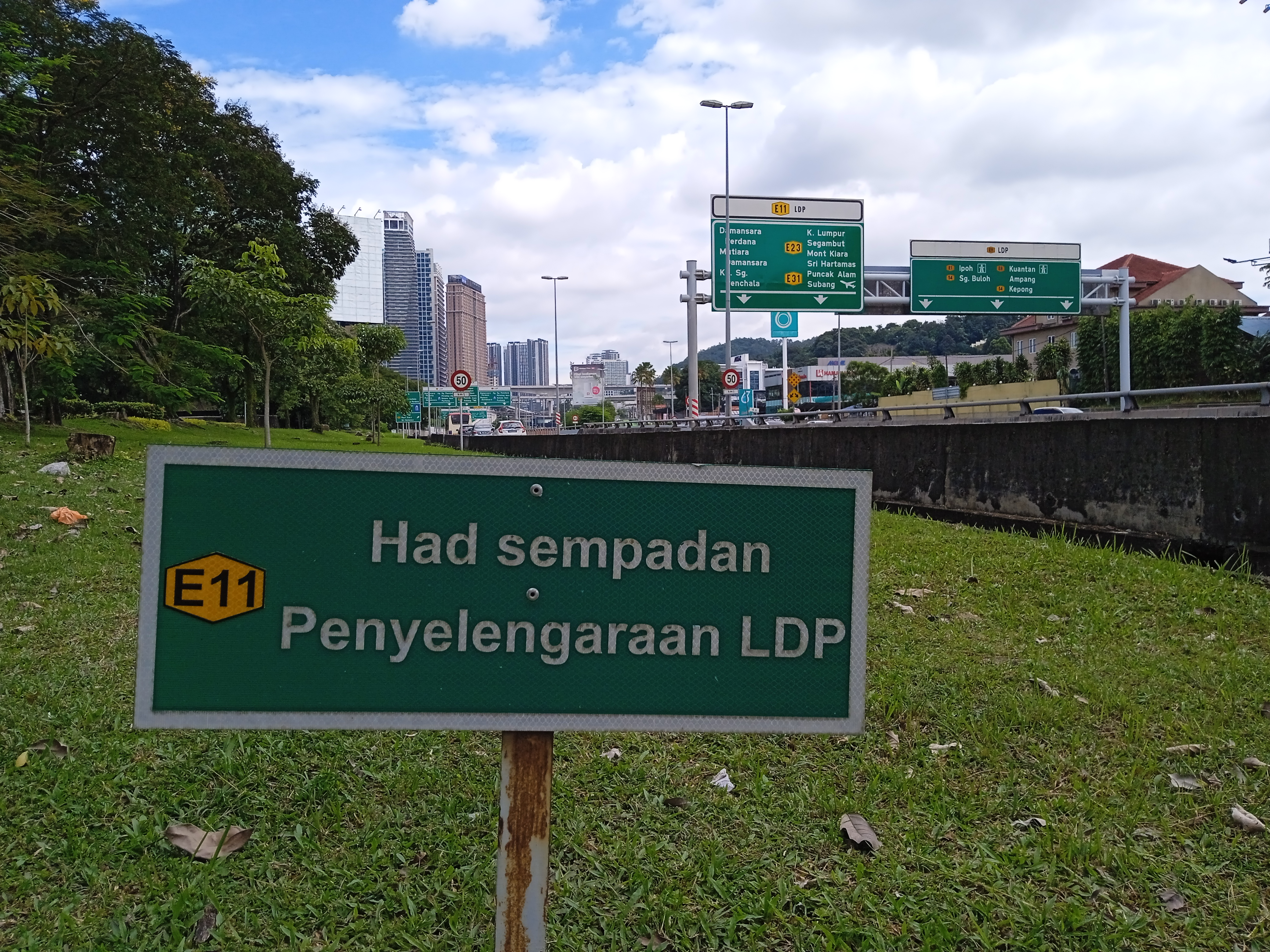
LDP maintenance limit signs at Mutiara Damansara.

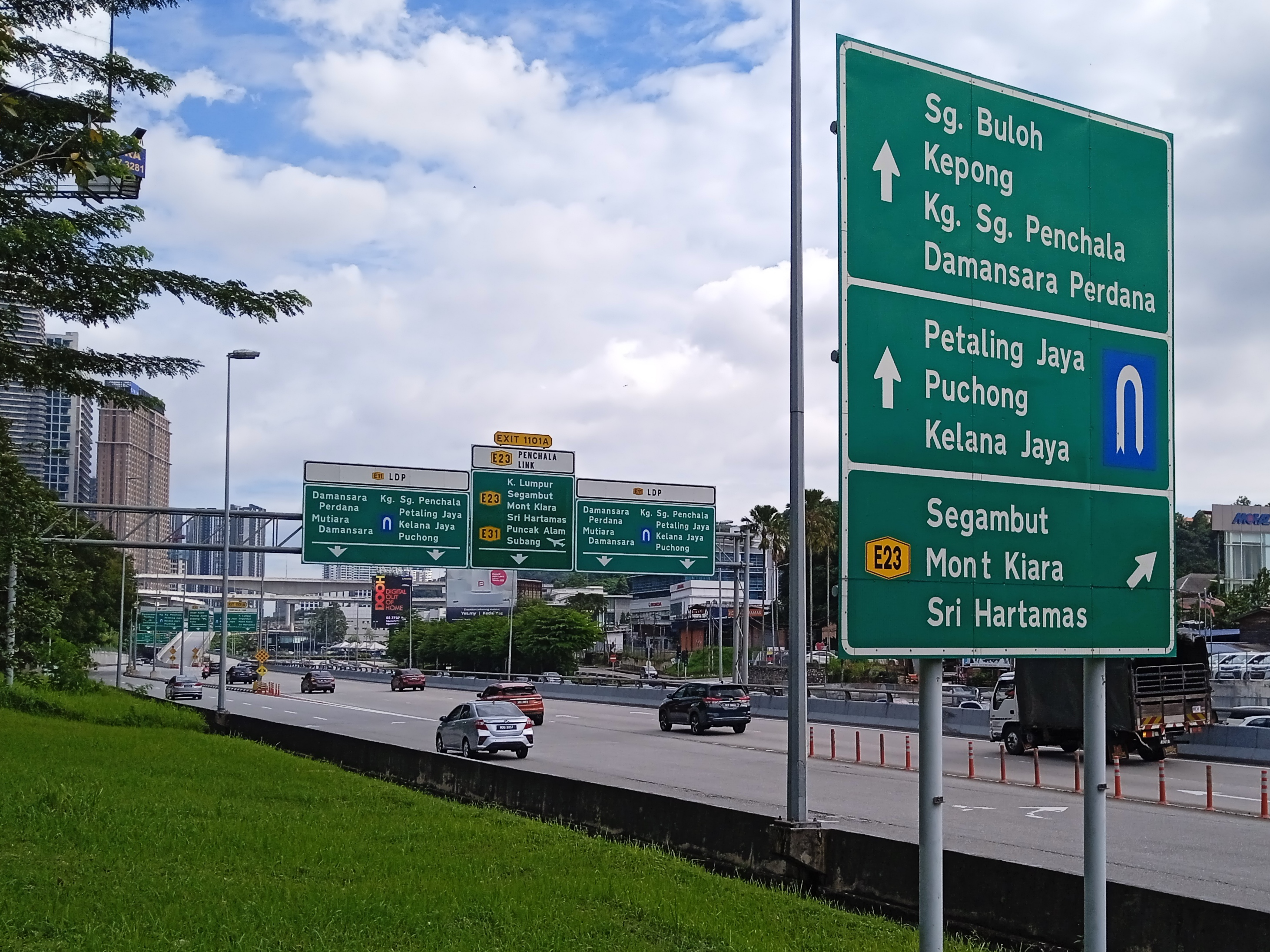
LDP towards Penchala Interchange.

== See also ==
- Malaysian expressway system
- Teras Teknologi (TERAS)
- Nighty LDP Expressway on YouTube
