= Puchong Gateway =

Human settlement in Malaysia

Puchong Gateway is a new township in Puchong, Selangor, Malaysia. This township is located south of Puchong area. It is accessible via Damansara–Puchong Expressway Damansara–Puchong Expressway from Petaling Jaya.
