= Puchong Perdana =

Puchong Perdana

Puchong Perdana in Petaling District

Puchong Perdana is one of the earliest housing estates in Puchong, Petaling District, Selangor, Malaysia. Construction started in the late 1980s. Puchong Perdana at this time was developing rapidly, with such a balanced development of other developed areas in the Klang Valley. Prior to the entrance area of Puchong Perdana is an imposing mosque on the edge of the lake. Facilities that they have in Puchong Perdana is Petronas petrol station, Caltex and Esso. and franchise restaurants like McDonald's and KFC are also found in Puchong.

There is a middle school and two primary schools in the area of Puchong Perdana SMK Puchong Perdana, SK Puchong Perdana and SK Puchong Indah.
