= Ayer Hitam Forest Reserve =

Coordinates: 3°00′54″N 101°39′00″E

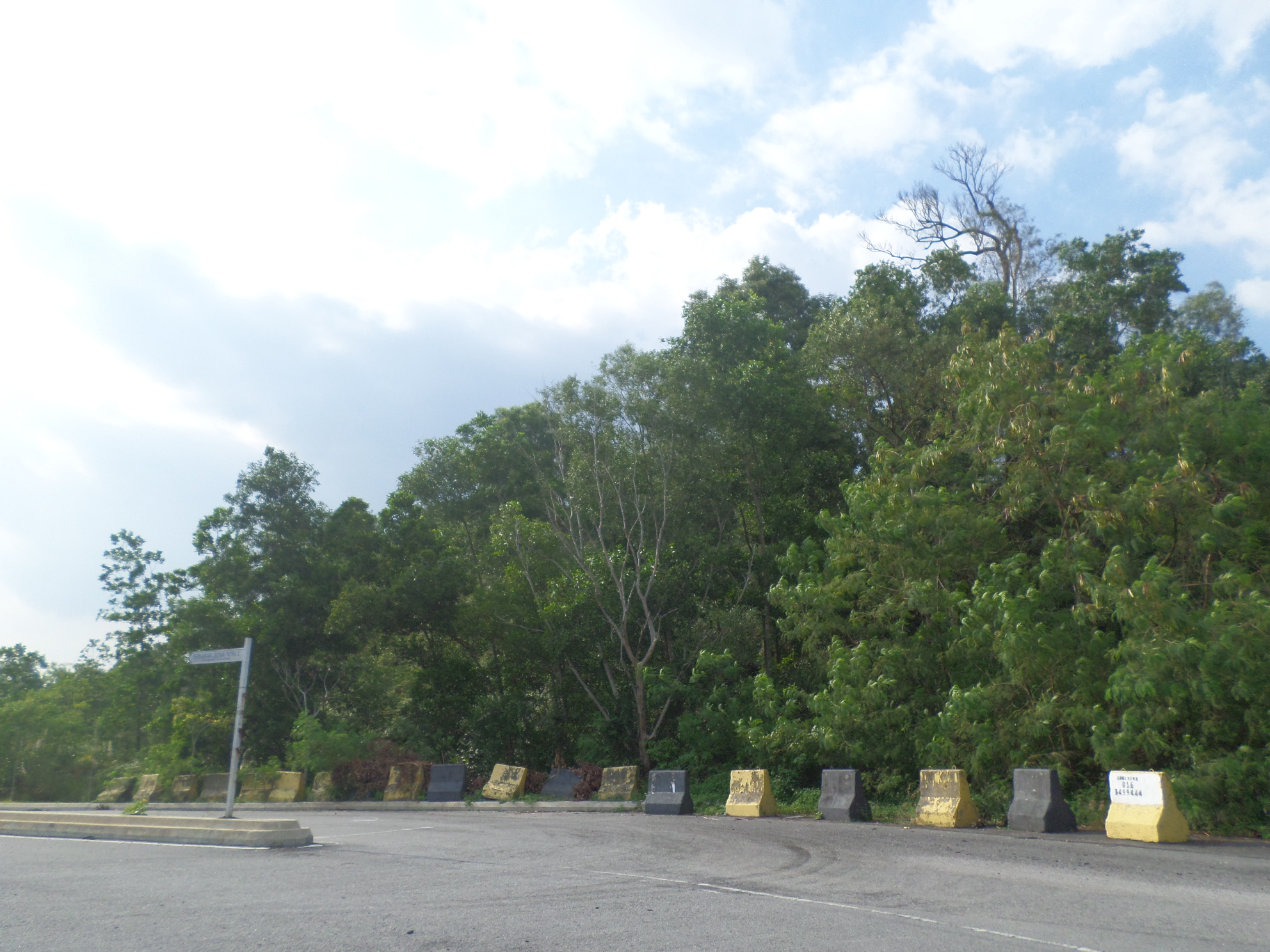
Ayer Hitam Forest Reserve

Ayer Hitam Forest Reserve is a 1182-hectare forest reserve managed by Universiti Putra Malaysia located in Puchong, Petaling District, Selangor, Malaysia. The reserve initially measured over 4000-hectare, but was gradually decreased since the 1960s to make way for development projects. The forest has actually been leased for 80 years to this university by the Selangor government.

== See also ==
- Geography of Malaysia
