= SMK Pusat Bandar Puchong (1) =

Location
- Sekolah Menengah Kebangsaan Pusat Bandar Puchong 1, Jalan Wawasan 2/23, Pusat Bandar Puchong, 47100 Puchong, Selangor; Puchong, Selangor; Malaysia; 3.02802°N 101.62321°E

Information
- School type: National Secondary School
- Motto: Berwawasan, Berketrampilan, Cemerlang
- Founded: 2011; 15 years ago
- Session: Morning(Form 3-5) and afternoon(Remove class and Form 1,2) sessions
- Principal: Noor Hasni bt Abdullah
- Language: Bahasa Melayu, English, Chinese, Tamil.

Sekolah Menengah Kebangsaan Pusat Bandar Puchong 1, or simply known as SMK Pusat Bandar Puchong 1, is a national secondary school located at Jalan Wawasan 2/23.

In 2009, Sekolah Menengah Kebangsaan Pusat Bandar Puchong 1 had an enrollment of 1,271 male students and 1,136 female students, bringing the total number of students to 2,407. It also had a total of 132 teachers.

== Incident ==
On 7 January 2020, lawyer Mohd Khairul Azam Abdul Aziz, who is also vice-president of the fledgling Putra, threatened to file a police report against SMK Pusat Bandar Puchong (1) in Pusat Bandar Puchong for its "religious" Chinese New Year decorations. The lawyer claimed the decoration to be "unconstitutional". He further claimed that Muslim parents had complained about the decorations, which they see as an attempt to propagate a non-Islam religion to students. Khairul later claimed the school principal, Rohani Mohd Noor, promised in an email reply to take down all the Chinese New Year decorations. Lately, former Deputy Minister of Education Teo Nie Ching had put back the CNY decoration along with Wan Azizah Wan Ismail and other Pakatan Harapan leaders.
