= Kampung Lombong =

Village in Selangor, Malaysia

Coordinates: 2°58′04.2″N 101°33′22.8″E

Kampung Lombong in September 2026

Kampung Lombong is a small village in Section 29, Shah Alam, Selangor, Malaysia.

The village is accessible through Jalan Kampung Lombong (from Puchong and Bandar Saujana Putra) and Jalan Kebun (from Klang, Kota Kemuning and Bukit Rimau). This road connects to various major highways and expressways namely KESAS (E5), SKVE (E26) and ELITE (E6).
