= Pusat Bandar Puchong =

Malaysian township

Puchong Town Centre is a township under the Subang Jaya Municipal Council in Puchong, Selangor, Malaysia.

== Education ==
Puchong Town Centre has 2 primary schools and 1 secondary school.
Primary:
Sekolah Kebangsaan Pusat Bandar Puchong (1)
Sekolah Kebangsaan Pusat Bandar Puchong (2)
Secondary:
Sekolah Menengah Kebangsaan Pusat Bandar Puchong (1)
