= Puchong Prima LRT station =

Metro station in Puchong, Malaysia

SP29 Puchong Prima
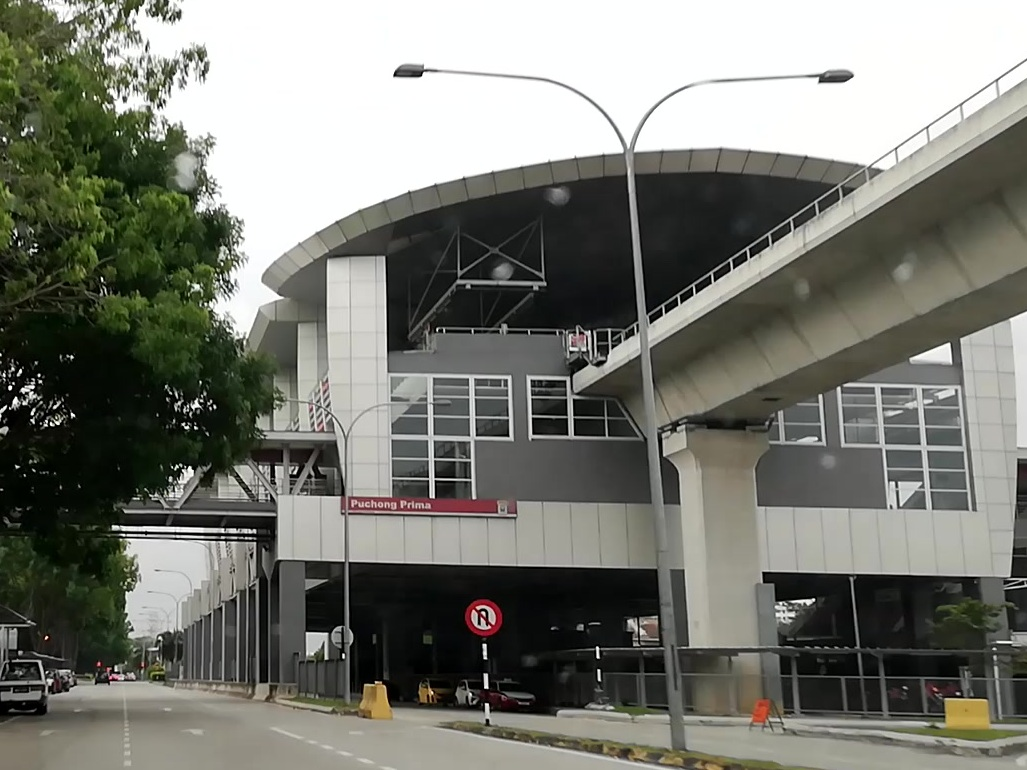
- Platform view of the station.

General information
- Other names: Malay: ڤوچوڠ ڤريما (Jawi); Chinese: 蒲种柏丽玛; Tamil: பூச்சோங் பிரிமா
- Location: Persiaran Puchong Permai, Taman Puchong Prima, 47100 Puchong; Selangor; Malaysia
- Coordinates: 2°59′59.8″N 101°35′48.1″E
- System: Rapid KL
- Owner: Prasarana Malaysia
- Operator: Rapid Rail
- Line: 4 Sri Petaling Line
- Platforms: 2 side platforms
- Tracks: 2

Construction
- Structure type: Elevated
- Parking: Not available

Other information
- Station code: SP29

History
- Opened: 30 June 2016; 10 years ago

Services
Preceding station		Following station
Puchong Perdana towards Sentul Timur	Sri Petaling Line	Putra Heights Terminus
Location

The Puchong Prima LRT station is a light rapid transit (LRT) station in Puchong Prima, a township of Puchong, Selangor, Malaysia. It is served by the LRT Sri Petaling Line, and is the last station before the line's terminus at Putra Heights.

Like most LRT stations operating in the Klang Valley, the station is an elevated station, which consists of two side platforms. It is connected to the street level by escalators, lifts and stairs. A pedestrian bridge over Persiaran Puchong Permai connects the station to the shops nearby, as well as a local supermarket. The station was built as part of the LRT Sri Petaling Line extension, which began construction in 2010 and opened on 30 June 2016.

The station is situated near OTK Supermarket, Taman Puchong Prima, Desa Idaman, Pangsapuri Lili, Pangsapuri Elina, as well as a secondary school. The station also serves residents from Bukit Puchong, Taman Tasik Prima, Meranti Jaya, Taman Puchong Permai and several other residential areas.

== History ==
The extension of both the Sri Petaling Line and Kelana Jaya Line was announced on 29 August 2006 by the then government. The project was also confirmed by then Prime Minister Abdullah Ahmad Badawi in his National Budget speech in 2006.

The extension project, worth RM955.84 million, was awarded to a joint venture (JV) consortium of George Kent (M) Bhd and its partner Lion Pacific Sdn Bhd. Despite facing several delays, the station was opened on 30 June 2016, along with the rest of the stations in the Sri Petaling Line extension and Kelana Jaya Line extension.

Residents nearby have complained that the viaduct that supports the elevated railway tracks are blocking the views of motorists at a three-way junction on Jalan Prima 1, causing accidents to happen frequently.

== Station ==
=== Station layout ===
Due to the lack of space, a drop-off spot was built instead of a park-and-ride facility. Two convenience stores, operated by Mynews.com and 7-Eleven can be found in the station, as well as a Pos Malaysia Kiosk. The entire station is disabled-friendly, with accessibility lifts, accessible toilets, a special wide faregate for wheelchair users and tactile paving provided throughout the station. The trains and station platforms are level with one another, with a minimal gap between the two, allowing for easy boarding with a wheelchair.

G	Street level	Drop off spot, bus stop, bus information kiosk, convenience store, Pos Laju kiosk
C	Concourse level	Ticket vending machine, faregates, convenience store, customer service office, pedestrian bridge
P	Side platform, doors will open on the left
P	Platform 1:	4 Sri Petaling Line towards AG1 SP1 Sentul Timur (→)
P	Platform 2:	4 Sri Petaling Line towards SP31 Putra Heights (←)
P	Side platform, doors will open on the left
refers to accessibility lift for disabled.

=== Green Infrastructure ===
As part of a green initiative, the station includes various green practices. Energy-efficient lights and rainwater harvesting systems were installed throughout station. Windows were designed to allow sunlight into the stations. The construction of the station utilized sustainable materials and recycling practices.

=== Entrances and Exits ===
Sri Petaling Line station
Entrance	Location	Destination	Picture
A	Jalan Prima 5/1	Pasaraya OTK, shops, Medan Selera Primewalk, Petronas gas station	
B	Jalan Prima 2/10	Housing area, Taman Puchong Prima, Desa Idaman, Pangsapuri Lili, Pangsapuri Elina	

== Bus Services ==
=== Feeder buses ===
Route No.	Origin	Destination	Via	Connecting to
T601	SP29 Puchong Prima; SP28 Puchong Perdana	Puchong Utama	Persiaran Puchong Permai; Persiaran Puchong Perdana; Jalan PU 6/1; Persiaran Puchong Utama; Jalan PU 7/1	600, 601, 608, T602
T603	SP29 Puchong Prima	Taman Mas Sepang; Taman Putra Prima	Persiaran Puchong Permai; Jalan TPT 1 Lingkaran Putra Prima; Jalan Taman Mas; Jalan Putra Prima Utara	Terminus

=== Other buses ===
Route No.	Origin	Destination	Via
602	SP24 IOI Puchong Jaya	Puchong Prima	Tesco Puchong; Setiawalk Puchong; Puteri Boulevard; Tractors Malaysia; SP28 Puchong Perdana; SP29 Puchong Prima; Pangasapuri Lily; Pangsapuri Melor
