= Dengkil =

Town in Selangor, Malaysia

Dengkil دڠکيل
- Town and mukim
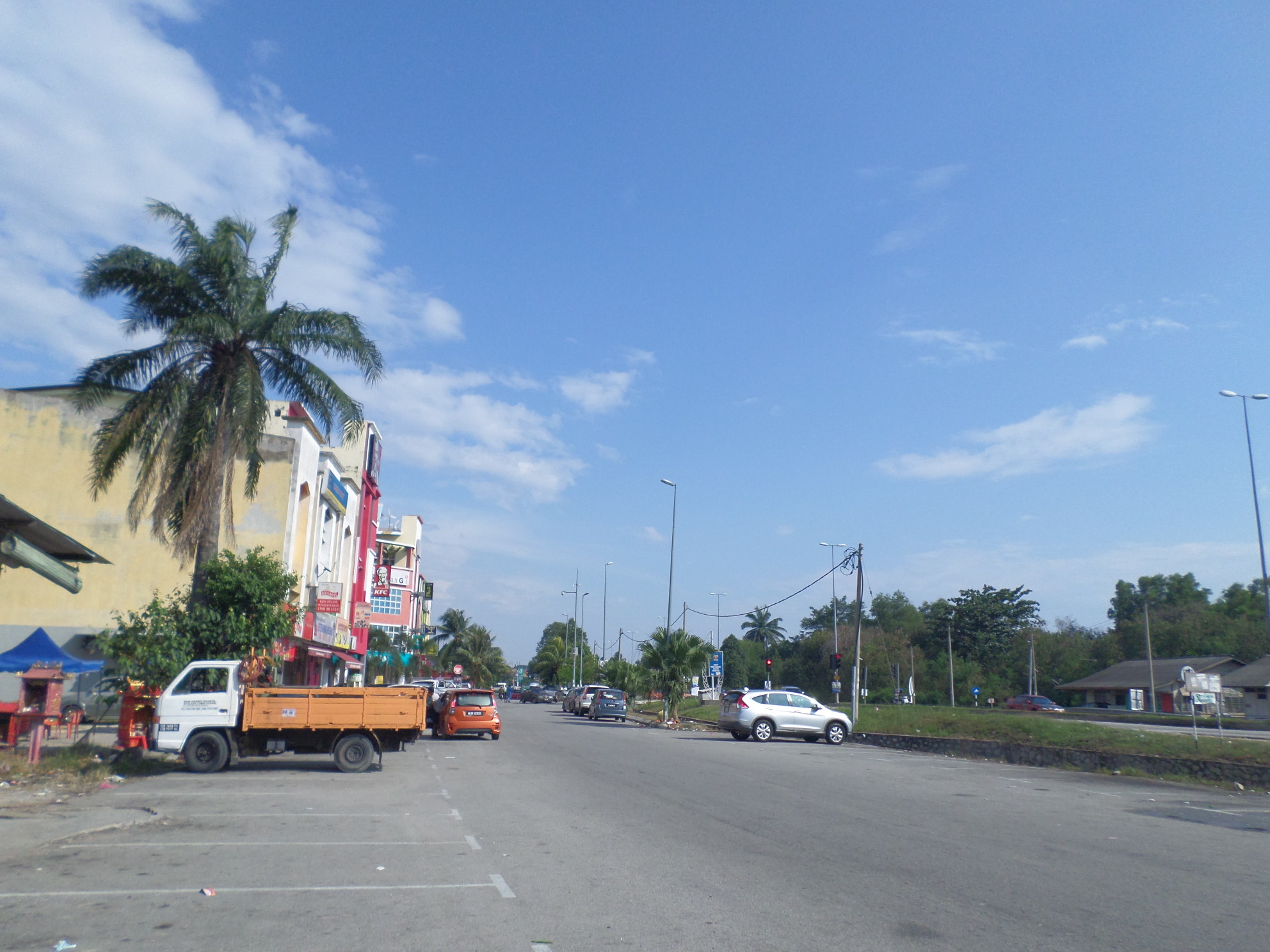
- Dengkil in 2016

- Dengkil in Sepang District
- Interactive map of Dengkil
- Coordinates: 2°51′58″N 101°40′30″E

Area
  - Total: 197.0 km^{2} (76.1 sq mi)

Population (2020)
  - Total: 188,903
  - Density: 958.9/km^{2} (2,484/sq mi)
- Time zone: UTC+8 (MST)
- Postal code: 43800
- Area code: 03
- Website: www.mpsp.gov.my

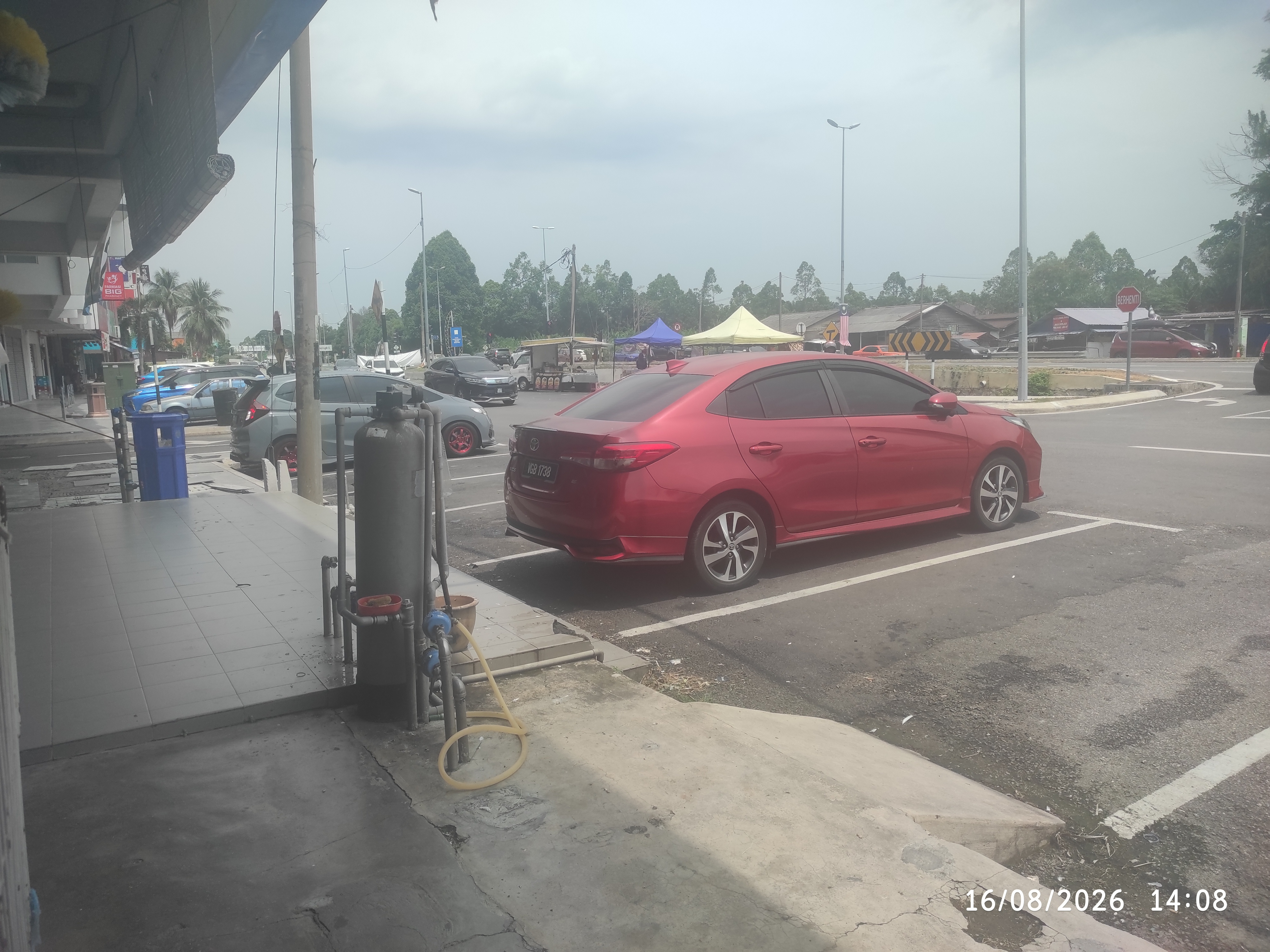
Dengkil in 2026

Dengkil (Chinese: 龍溪) is a town and mukim in Sepang District, southern Selangor, Malaysia.

== History ==
Dengkil started as a traditional Malay settlement and boomed in the 1920s as a major tin mining hub in the Hulu Langat district. Later it became part of Sepang district when the district was formed on January 1, 1975. After the tin crash in the mid-1980s, it transitioned into a quiet agricultural town.

=== Name origins ===
Local oral history suggests the name "Dengkil" may come from a British explorer or plantation manager named George, which was pronounced "Dengkil" by locals. Other theories attribute the name to the local term "dingkil" (a barren fruit) or "dengkel" (meaning shallow, referencing the nearby Langat River).

=== "Dragon Steam" legend ===
The local Chinese community historically referred to the town as Ling Kay (龍溪, lit. Dragon stream). Legend holds that a dragon meditated in the Langat River for 900 years before being driven away by the British.

=== Emergency period ===
In 1950, during the communist insurgency, the British gathered scattered Chinese communities into Kampung Baru Seri Dengkil to establish better security and control over the local populace.

== Population ==
- Dengkil mukim (sub-district)
  - 188,903 (2020 census)
  - ~200,000 (2026)
- Pekan Dengkil (smaller town center)
  - 11,300

== Geography ==
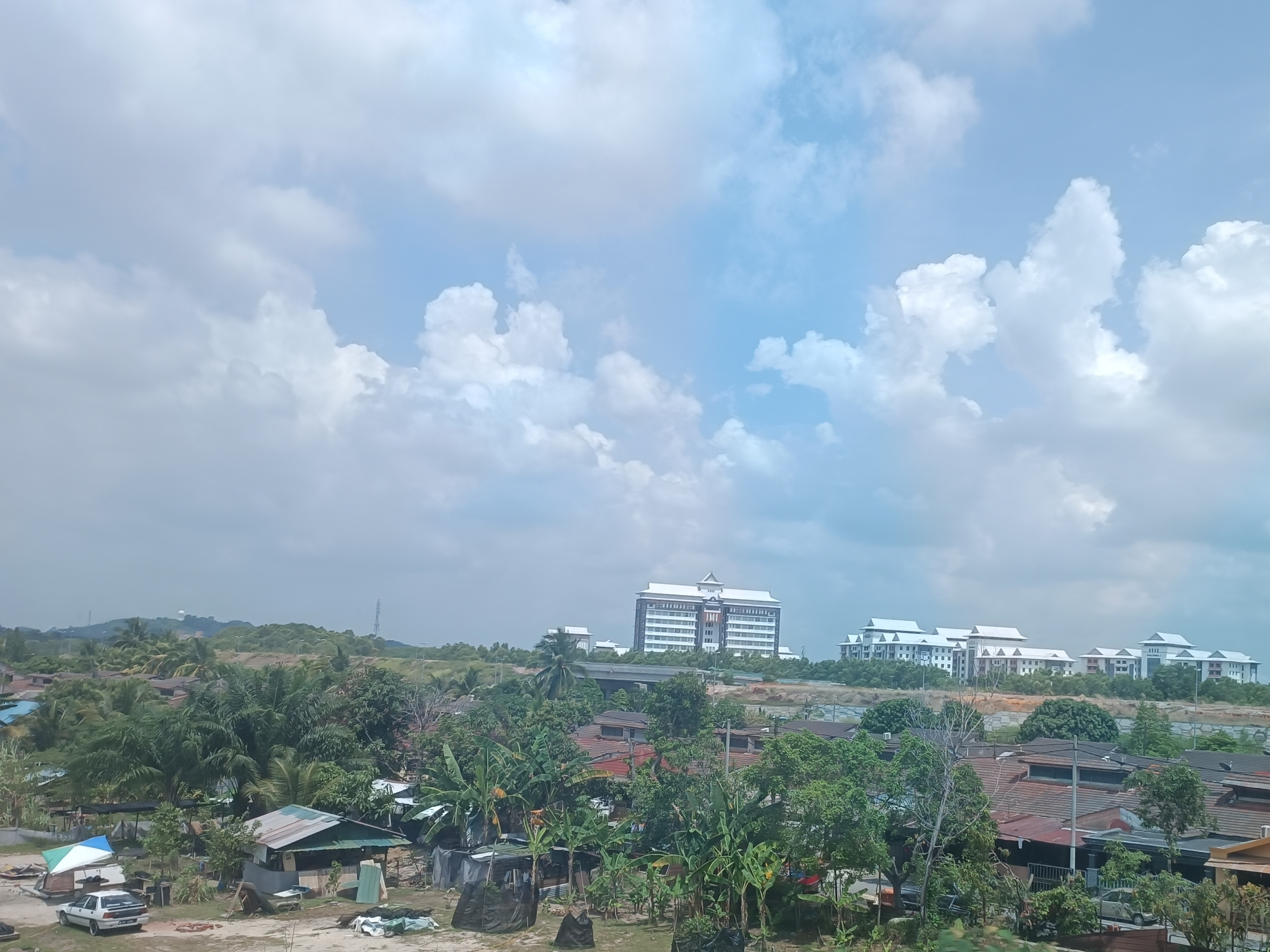
UiTM Dengkil campus

The town lies between Cyberjaya to the northwest and the Kuala Lumpur International Airport to the south. It is located just outside Putrajaya's southern border.

There are two well-known rivers in Dengkil, Sungai Semenyih and Sungai Langat, the rivers merge near Jenderam Hilir.

== Floods ==
=== 2021–2022 Malaysian floods ===
In around mid-December 2021, Dengkil was hit by biggest and most devastating flood in Malaysia history. Dengkil was one of hardest-hit areas in Selangor. Over 3,500 residential homes were submerged. Two people died during the flood in dengkil.

=== 2022–2023 Malaysian floods ===
In around December 2022, flood hits Dengkil again. Luckily, fewer homes were submerged, but it's still devastating to Dengkil and other areas.

== Schools and universities ==
- Schools
  - Pekan Dengkil
    - SMK Dengkil
    - SJK (C) Dengkil
    - SK Dengkil
    - SJK (T) Dengkil
    - SJK (T) Taman Pertama
    - SK Jenderam
  - Dengkil mukim
    - SK Jenderam Hilir
    - SK Desa Pinggiran Putra
    - SAM Sg Merab Luar
- Universities
  - Pekan Dengkil
    - UiTM Dengkil
  - Dengkil mukim
    - Xiamen University Malaysia

== Nature parks ==
- The Island @ Cybersouth
- Central Park @ Cybersouth
- Serenia City Central Park

== Tourist attractions ==
- Sri Banting Old Tin Dredge
- Paya Indah Wetlands
- SplashMania WaterPark

== See also ==
- Sepang topics
