= Puchong =

Town in Selangor, Malaysia

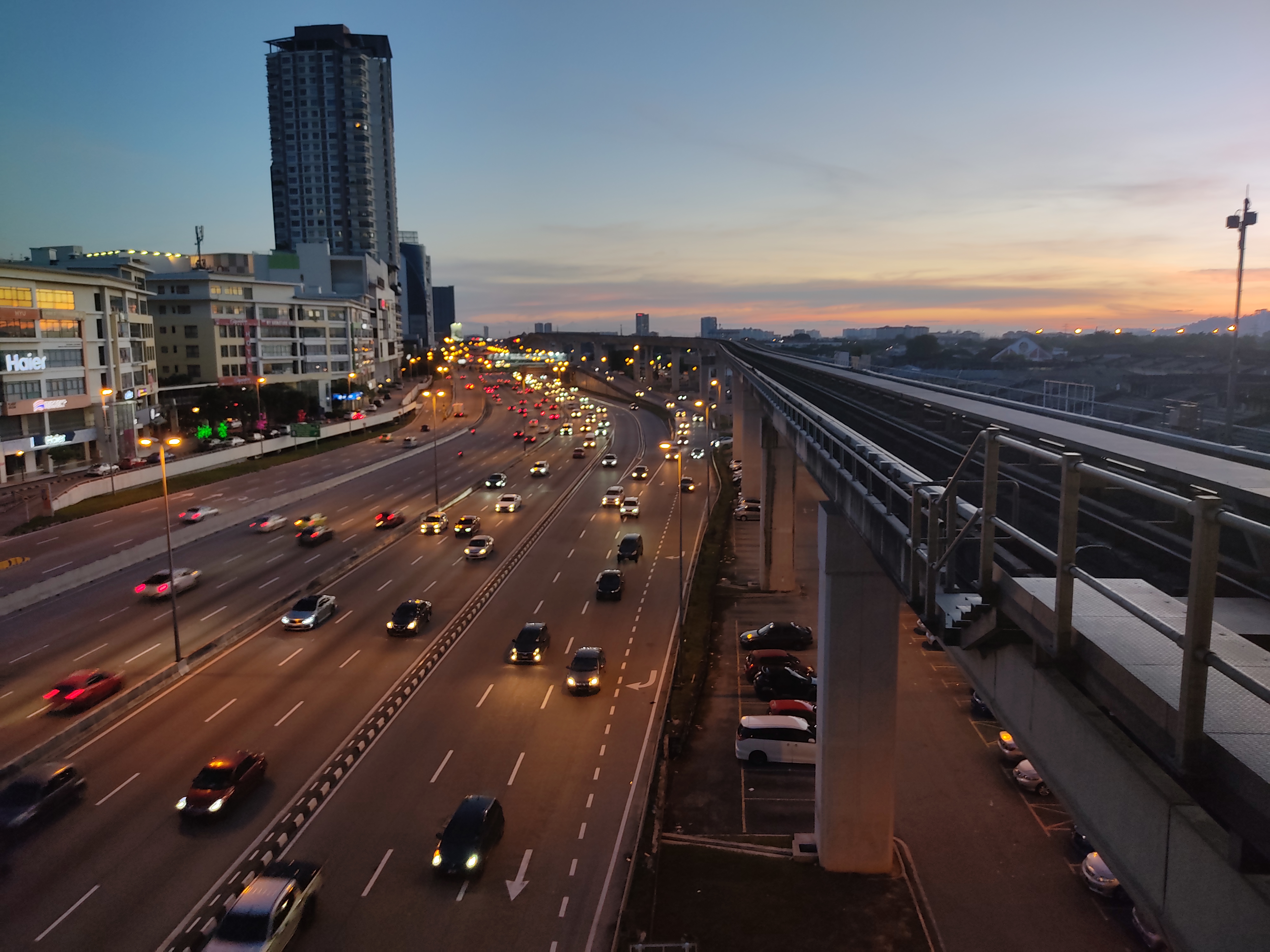

- Location in Malaysia
- Coordinates: 3°02′08″N 101°37′02″E
- Country: Malaysia
- State: Selangor
- District: Petaling
- Establishment: Early 1900s

Area
  - Total: 51.71 km^{2} (19.97 sq mi)

Population (2020)
  - Total: 375,181
  - Density: 4,810/km^{2} (12,500/sq mi)
- Time zone: UTC+8 (MST)
  - Summer (DST): Not applicable
- Postcode: 47100 (Main); 43300 (Seri Kembangan); 58200 (Kuala Lumpur)
- Area codes: Mostly +603-80 and +603-58, rarely +60-3-77, +60-3-79, +603-83 and +603-89

Puchong is a major town and a parliamentary constituency in the Petaling District, in the state of Selangor, Malaysia. Bordering Kuala Lumpur, it is part of the Greater Kuala Lumpur area. It is bordered by Petaling Jaya in the north, Subang Jaya in the west, Cyberjaya and Putrajaya in the south, and Seri Kembangan in the east.

Once a small settlement consisting of the tin mining and rubber tapping communities, Puchong has evolved into one of Klang Valley's most vibrant and bustling townships. While parts of Puchong have developed with residents who commute and work in both urban and suburban areas, many pockets have yet to fully mature, allowing a greater sprawl of urban dwellers to seek inhabitancy. This demand in living space is largely driven by the commute distance to Kuala Lumpur City Centre and sharp increase in property prices across other parts of the Kuala Lumpur (KL) metropolitan area.

== History ==
The first settlers of the area were the Orang Asli community in a village known as Kampung Pulas. In the 1900s, little herons (Malay: burung pucung) were aplenty in the area and were a staple for the Orang Asli. It is widely believed that the name "Puchong" is derived and adopted from this heron by the early settlers.

However, it is believed that the area was explored by immigrants from Sumatra and Java. They initially worked as fish mongers, rubber tappers and miners. Due to the booming tin mining industry, immigrants from China and India were subsequently brought in.

During the communist insurgency in 1948, all residents were resettled to an area which is known as Kampung Baru Batu 14.

During the 1980s, Puchong consisted of a single two-lane road running through estates and villages. Puchong development began circa 1985, when the mining licenses expired and infrastructure began to be built. The rapid development of nearby Putrajaya, the new federal administrative capital, and Cyberjaya further accelerated Puchong's growth. The relative close proximity to urban centres of the KL metro area such as KLCC, Bandar Sunway, Bukit Jalil, Old Klang Road and Sungai Besi attracted additional residents.

On 19 February 1989, Flying Tiger Line Flight 066 crashed in Puchong. All 4 people aboard perished.

Since then, urbanisation occurred rapidly with many industrial parks, commercial centres and residential areas mushrooming along Jalan Puchong. Residential areas include Taman Kinrara, Bandar Bukit Puchong 2 and Bandar Kinrara.

== Governance ==
Puchong is under the jurisdiction of four local authorities;

- 5th to 7th mile stretch is under Kuala Lumpur City Hall (DBKL) jurisdiction (Seputeh)
- Taman Tenaga, Kinrara, 8th to 16th mile, Taman Puchong Utama, Taman Saujana Puchong, Puchong Prima, Bukit Puchong 1, Bandar Puteri and Puchong Permai is under the Subang Jaya City Council (MBSJ) in Petaling District (Petaling subdistrict) and
- Bukit Puchong 2, 16 Sierra, Pulau Meranti, Bandar Nusaputra, Taman Putra Perdana, Taman Putra Prima, Taman Meranti Jaya and Taman Mas, is under Sepang Municipal Council (MPSepang) in Sepang District (Dengkil subdistrict).
- The remaining areas near Bandar Saujana Putra such as Taman Dagang Mas, Koi Prima and Putra Industrial Park, is under Kuala Langat Municipal Council (MPKL) in Kuala Langat District (Tanjung Dua Belas subdistrict).

The Puchong town centre (Malay: Pusat Bandar Puchong) is mostly located within MBSJ's (Subang Jaya) jurisdictional area in the Petaling District.

== Demographics ==
According to the 2020 census, the area of Puchong had a population of 375,181.

The following is based on the Department of Statistics Malaysia 2020 census.

Ethnic groups in Puchong, 2020
| Ethnicity | Population | Percentage |
|---|---|---|
| Bumiputera | 185,339 | 45.4% |
| Chinese | 153,824 | 41.0% |
| Indian | 32,641 | 8.7% |
| Others | 3,377 | 0.9% |
| Non-Malaysian | 15,007 | 4.0% |

== Politics ==
Representing in the Federal Parliament (Dewan Rakyat)

| Parliament | Seat name | Member of Parliament | Party |
|---|---|---|---|
| P102 | Bangi | Syahredzan Johan | Pakatan Harapan (PH-DAP) |
| P103 | Puchong | Yeo Bee Yin | Pakatan Harapan (PH-DAP) |
| P112 | Kuala Langat | Ahmad Yunus Hairi | Perikatan Nasional(PN-PAS) |
| P113 | Sepang | Aiman Athirah Sabu | Pakatan Harapan (PH-AMANAH) |
| P122 | Seputeh | Teresa Kok | Pakatan Harapan (PH-DAP) |

Representing in the State Legislative Assembly (Dewan Undangan Negeri) in Selangor

| Parliament | State | Seat name | State Assemblyman | Party |
|---|---|---|---|---|
| P102 | N26 | Sungai Ramal | Mohd Shafie Ngah | Perikatan Nasional (PN-PAS) |
| P102 | N28 | Seri Kembangan | Wong Siew Ki | Pakatan Harapan (PH-DAP) |
| P103 | N29 | Sri Serdang | Abbas Salimi Azmi | Pakatan Harapan (PH-Amanah) |
| P103 | N30 | Kinrara | Ng Sze Han | Pakatan Harapan (PH-DAP) |
| P112 | N51 | Sijangkang | Ahmad Yunus Hairi | Perikatan Nasional (PN-PAS) |
| P113 | N55 | Dengkil | Jamil Salleh | Perikatan Nasional (PN-BERSATU) |

== Postcodes ==
| Postcode | Areas covered | Local authority |
|---|---|---|
| 43300 | Lestari Puchong, Lestari Perdana, Putra Permai | Subang Jaya City Council (MBSJ) |
| 47100 | Bandar Puteri Puchong, Taman Industri Pusat Bandar Puchong, 12 to 14th mile, Jalan Puchong, Taman PKNS, Taman Puchong Hartamas, Taman Puchong Impian, Kampung Pasir Baru, Kampung Bunga Melur, Kampung Pasir Cina, Kampung Baru Puchong, Koi Tropika, Taman Puchong Utama, Bandar Puchong Jaya, Casa Tropika | Subang Jaya City Council (MBSJ) |
| 47110 | Taman Saujana Puchong, Taman Mutiara Indah, Laman Granview | Subang Jaya City Council (MBSJ) |
| 47110 | Sierra 2, Sierra 3, Sierra 5, Sierra 7, Sierra 8, Sierra 9, Sierra 10, Sierra 11, Sierra 12, Sierra 15, Sierra 17, Bandar 16 Sierra, Bandar Puchong South | Sepang Municipal Council (MPSepang) |
| 47120 | Bandar Bukit Puchong 2, D'Island, Pulau Meranti, Taman Desa Air Hitam, Taman Perindustrian Meranti Jaya, Taman Meranti Jaya, Taman Putra Impiana, Taman Tasik Puchong, Taman Meranti Indah, Taman Perindustrian Tasik Perdana, Duta Perdana, Taman Meranti Permai, Taman KiPark Puchong, Desaria Apartment, Bandar D'Alpinia, Taman Abadi Heights, Aman Putra, Batu 18 Sungai Rasau | Sepang Municipal Council (MPSepang) |
| 47130 | Taman Mas Sepang, Taman Putra Perdana, Taman Amanputra, Bandar Nusaputra, Taman Putra Prima | Sepang Municipal Council (MPSepang) |
| 47130 | Koi Prima, Taman Dagang Mas, Taman Mas Langat, Putra Industrial Park | Kuala Langat Municipal Council (MPKL) |
| 47140 | Taman Puchong Utama, Bandar Puchong Utama, Bandar Bukit Puchong 1 | Subang Jaya City Council (MBSJ) |
| 47150 | Taman Tasik Prima, Taman Puchong Perdana, Kampung Seri Aman, Taman Puchong Tekali, Taman Puchong Prima, Taman Puchong Indah, Bandar Metro Puchong, Bistari Residensi, Desa Millennia | Subang Jaya City Council (MBSJ) |
| 47160 | Pusat Bandar Puchong, Taman Wawasan, Taman Wawasan 2 | Subang Jaya City Council (MBSJ) |
| 47170 | Bandar Puchong Jaya, IOI Mall, Taman Tenaga, Aman Sari, Bukit Tandang, Casa Square | Subang Jaya City Council (MBSJ) |
| 47180 | Taman Kinrara (Section 1 to 2), Bandar Kinrara (BK 1 to 9), Duta Kinrara | Subang Jaya City Council (MBSJ) |
| 47190 | Taman Kinrara (Section 3 to 5), Taman Bukit Kuchai, Kampung Desa Kuchai | Subang Jaya City Council (MBSJ) |
| 58200 | 6th to 7th mile, Jalan Puchong, Kinrara Mas, Alam Sutera, Kg Muhibbah | Kuala Lumpur City Hall (DBKL) |

== Economy ==
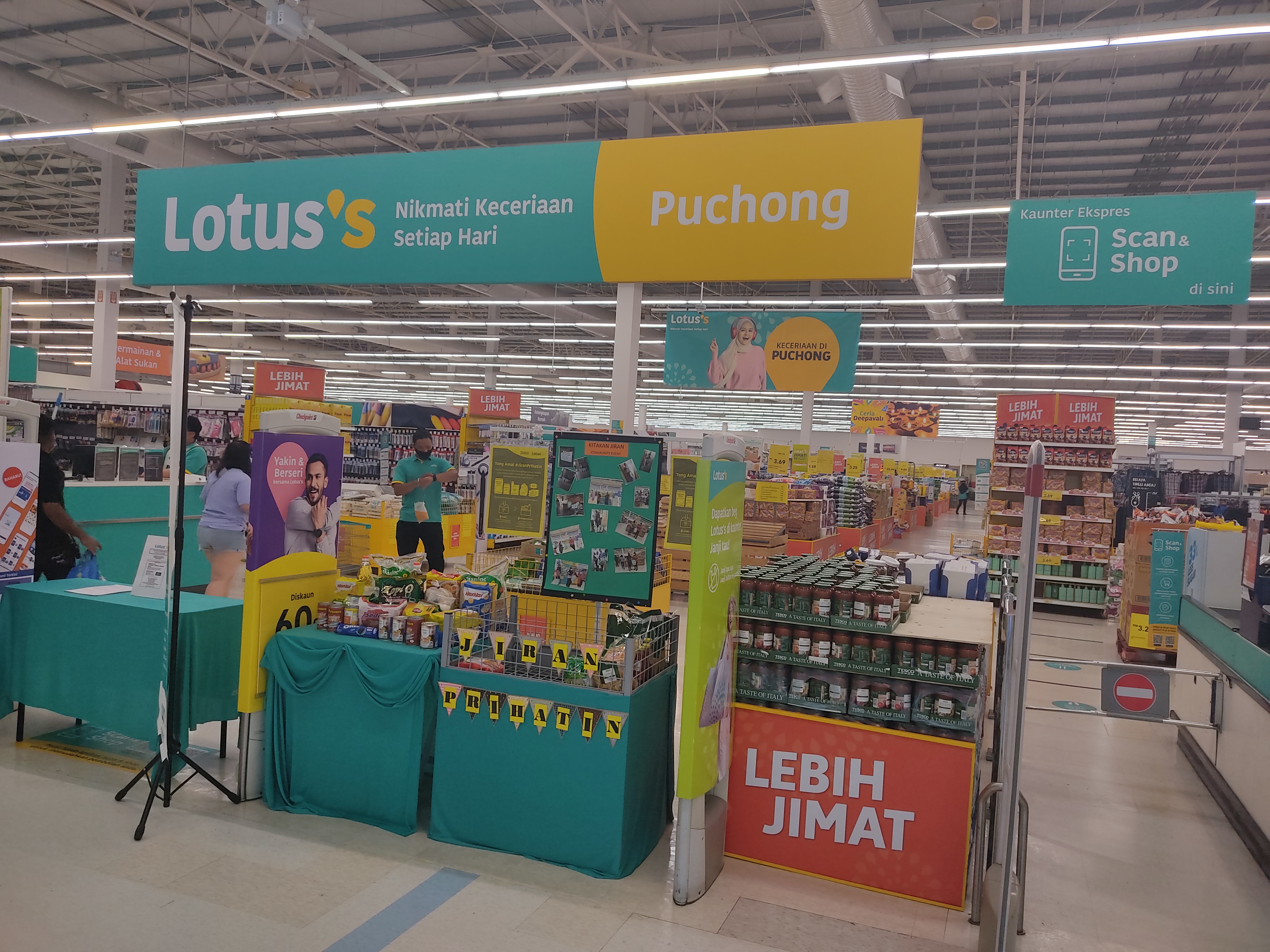
Lotus's Puchong

HeroMarket Bandar Puteri Puchong

The 1980s and 1990s saw massive development in the entire township.

The Damansara-Puchong Expressway (LDP) is not only the arterial of Puchong but also the main avenue where most major commerce centres are located. IOI Mall, the first major shopping mall in Puchong, opened its doors in 1996 along LDP. IOI Boulevard is a business centre with retail and office units. A similar project by S P Setia called SetiaWalk Puchong is situated centrally on a stretch of the expressway.

== Recreation ==
Arena MBSJ Puchong

The Arena MBSJ Puchong is a multi-purpose sports complex located on a 1.67-hectare site along Jalan Persiaran Indera in Pusat Bandar Puchong. Officially opened in July 2026 by the Subang Jaya City Council (MBSJ) at a cost of RM22.2 million, it serves the local community with features including three futsal courts, five badminton courts, a basketball court, and an outdoor jogging track. The venue was constructed to bolster local sports access and also served as the official sports host for the sepak takraw events during the SUKMA XXII Selangor 2026 national games. Rakan Muda Sports Complex is a sport centre that serves residents of Puchong with a plethora of sports including futsal and badminton.

The Ayer Hitam Forest Reserve is one of the only remaining green lungs in Puchong. A popular trekking spot for active residents to enjoy nature. There are many mining ponds around Puchong where locals engage in water sports and fishing. There is also the Taman Wawasan Recreational Park for residents around this area. It is complete with a jogging track, basketball courts and children's playground. This is a popular location during the weekends where residents can be seen organizing activities throughout the day.

== Healthcare ==
Private hospitals Columbia Asia Hospital and KPMC Puchong Medical Centre are both located at Bandar Puteri Puchong.

A public government clinic is located at Puchong Batu 14.

== Education ==
=== Primary schools ===
- SK Puchong
- SK Puchong Perdana
- SK Bukit Kuchai
- SK Puchong Utama
- SK Puchong Utama 2
- SK Seksyen 1 Bandar Kinrara
- SK Seksyen 2 Bandar Kinrara
- SK Puchong Indah
- SK Pusat Bandar Puchong 1
- SK Pusat Bandar Puchong 2
- SK Pulau Meranti
- SK Taman Putra Perdana 1
- SK Taman Putra Perdana 2
- SK Saujana Puchong
- SK Puchong Jaya

=== Chinese Primary Schools ===
- SJK(C) Han Ming
- SJK(C) Yak Chee
- SJK(C) Sin Ming
- SJK(C) Shin Cheng (Harcroft)
- SJK(C) Kheng Chee

=== Tamil Primary Schools ===
- SJK(T) Puchong
- SJK(T) Castlefield
- SJK(T) Kinrara

=== International and Private Schools ===
- Rafflesia International School
- Sekolah Rendah Rafflesia (Primary)
- Taylor's International School
- British Circle Academy
- Axcel Campus
- Regent International School, Puchong (permanently closed)
- Inspiros International School
- RightBridge Academy (permanently closed)
- Aletheia Resource Center
- MAHSA International School (located in Bandar Saujana Putra, Kuala Langat, on the other side of Puchong)

=== Secondary schools ===
- Rafflesia International School
- Taylor's International School
- SMK Puchong Utama (1)
- SMK Puchong Batu 14
- SMK Puchong Perdana
- SMK Puchong Permai
- Sekolah Menengah Islam Puchong
- SMK Pusat Bandar Puchong 1
- SMK Bandar Puchong Jaya A
- SMK Bandar Puchong Jaya B
- SMK Seksyen 1 Bandar Kinrara
- SMK Seksyen 3 Bandar Kinrara
- SMK Seksyen 4 Bandar Kinrara
- SMK Batu 8
- SMK Putra Perdana

=== Higher education ===
- RIMA International College (specialize in LCCI courses, Business programmes from Heriot-Watt, Bioscience, Hotel Management programme from CTH (endorsed by Gordon Ramsay))
- Binary University College (specializes in management and entrepreneurship courses)
- Putra Intelek International College (located in Bandar Puteri 5, Puchong, they are specialized in Risk Management, Information Technology, Business Management, Accounting and Finance and Forensic Accounting)
- MAHSA University (located in Bandar Saujana Putra, Kuala Langat, on the other side of Puchong)

== Transport ==
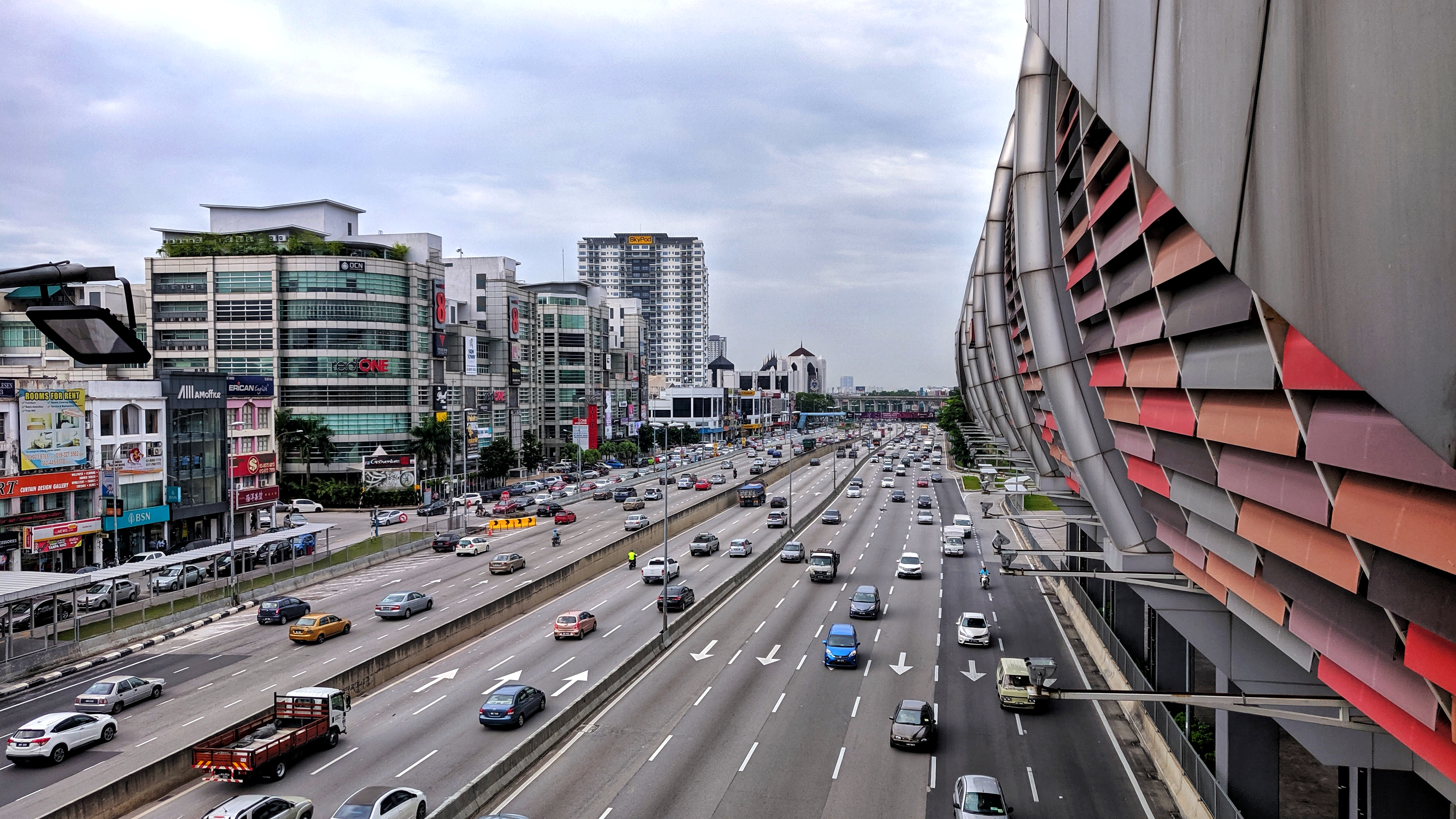
LDP Highway Puchong Jaya stretch

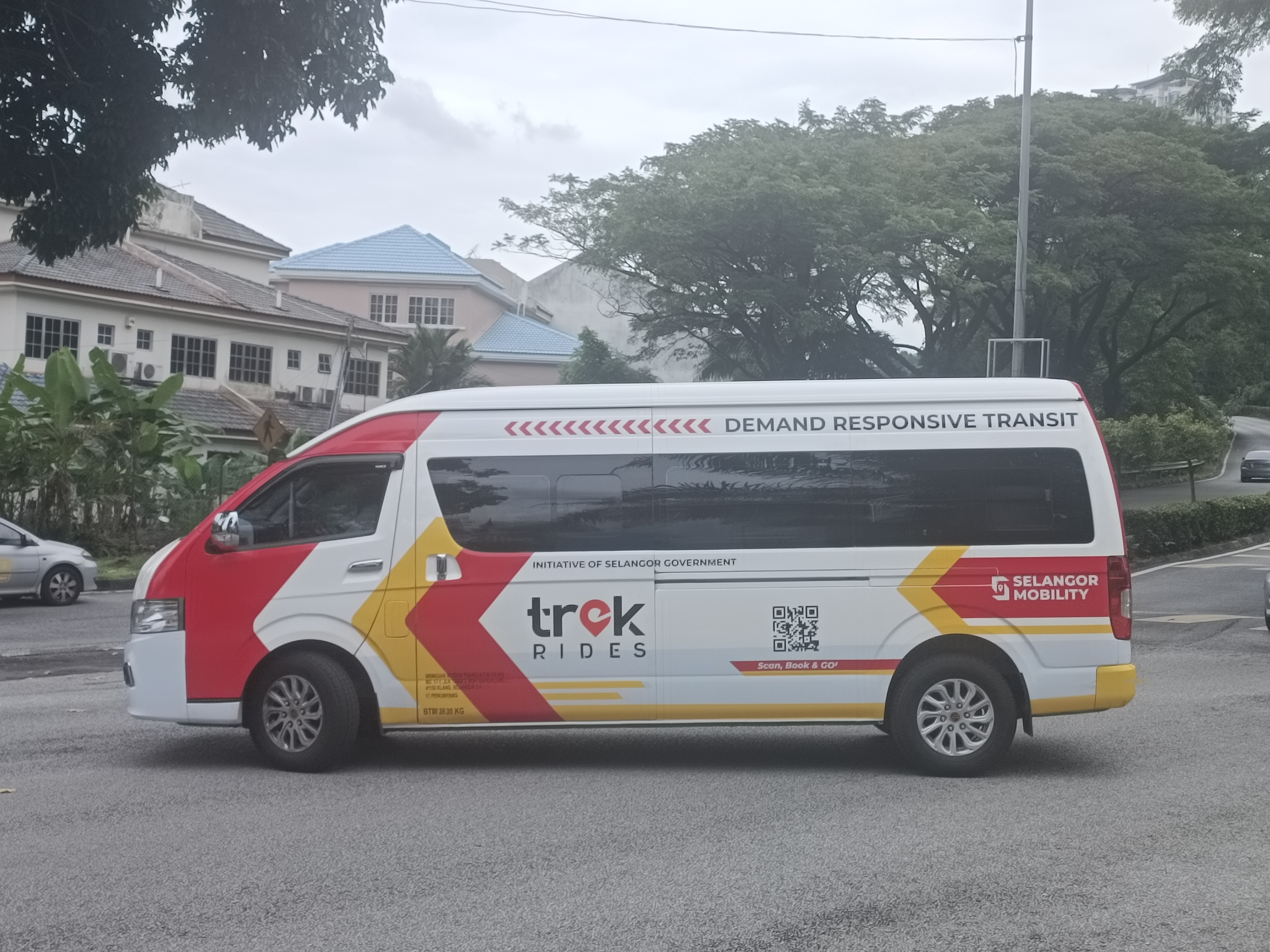
TrekRides ride-sharing service in Bandar Puchong Jaya

=== Expressways/Highways ===
The main thoroughfare is the Damansara–Puchong Expressway which links Puchong to Kepong. Another route, the Shah Alam Expressway connects Puchong to Port Klang, Shah Alam, Subang Jaya and Sri Petaling.

Other highways include:

- North–South Expressway Central Link highway, which connects between Shah Alam, Putra Heights, Bandar Saujana Putra, Kuala Lumpur International Airport and Nilai, accessible through Jalan Kampung Lombong in Taman Mas/Taman Putra Prima or Jalan Puchong–Dengkil in Bandar Nusaputra/Putra Perdana.
- Putrajaya Link, which connects between Putrajaya and Cyberjaya, accessible through Jalan Puchong–Dengkil in Bandar Nusaputra/Putra Perdana.
- South Klang Valley Expressway connects Puchong to Pulau Indah, Banting and Kajang, accessible through Damansara–Puchong Expressway or Jalan Kampung Lombong in Taman Mas/Taman Putra Prima.

=== Roads ===
- Bukit Jalil Highway Federal Route 217, connects from Bandar Kinrara to Bukit Jalil and Malaysia Technology Park.
- Jalan Puchong–Petaling Jaya (Selangor state highway B11) connects from Petaling Jaya or Old Klang Road areas to Bandar Kinrara in Puchong.
- Jalan Puchong–Dengkil (Selangor state highway B15) connects from Bandar Puteri Puchong to Cyberjaya and Putrajaya Link, including Puchong suburbs of Taman Putra Perdana, Pulau Meranti, Bandar Bukit Puchong, Taman Meranti Jaya and Puchong Utama.
- Shah Alam–Puchong Highway (Federal route 3214) connects from Puchong Barat to Shah Alam, Alam Megah (Section 26/27/28), Putra Heights and USJ/Subang Jaya (Persiaran Kewajipan).
- Lingkaran Putra Prima connects from Taman Meranti Jaya to several Puchong suburbs such as Puchong Utama, Taman Puchong Tekali, Taman Tasik Prima, Kampung Seri Aman, Taman Mas Sepang, Taman Putra Prima, Putra Industrial Park, Koi Prima and Bandar Saujana Putra. This road can be used as a transit route towards ELITE or SKVE expressways through Jalan Kampung Lombong.

=== Bus ===
Bus services connect Puchong to Kuala Lumpur, Subang Jaya, Bandar Sunway, Petaling Jaya, Putrajaya and Cyberjaya.

Bus services are provided by RapidKL and Causeway Link (based in Johor Bahru) which have routes along Jalan Puchong, Jalan Klang Lama and Damansara–Puchong Expressway to various destinations around Klang Valley. Taman Kinrara, one of the nearest housing estates to the city, is only about 30 metres from the border between Selangor and Kuala Lumpur.

==== Bus routes ====
- 503: KT3 PY41 Putrajaya Sentral - Taman Puchong Utama via Cyberjaya and Taman Putra Perdana (operated by Causeway Link)
- 506: Bandar Utama bus hub - KT3 PY41 Putrajaya Sentral via Damansara–Puchong Expressway and Pusat Bandar Puchong (operated by RapidKL)
- 600: Taman Puchong Utama - Pasar Seni via Damansara–Puchong Expressway (operated by RapidKL)
- 601: Taman Putra Perdana - Pasar Seni via Batu 14 Puchong and Bandar Puteri Puchong (operated by Causeway Link)
- 602: Taman Puchong Prima - SP24 IOI Puchong Jaya LRT station via Puchong Perdana (operated by RapidKL)
- ~~604: Taman Saujana Puchong - Pasar Seni via Batu 14 Puchong and Bandar Puteri Puchong (operated by Causeway Link)~~ (terminated)
- 608: Pulau Meranti - SP24 IOI Puchong Jaya LRT station via Puchong Utama, Batu 14 Puchong and Bandar Puteri Puchong (operated by Causeway Link)
- T545: PY37 Putra Permai MRT station - Taman Puchong Utama via SP28 Puchong Perdana LRT station (operated by RapidKL MRT Feeder Bus)
- T600: SP24 IOI Puchong Jaya LRT station - Taman Wawasan (operated by RapidKL)
- T601: SP29 Puchong Prima LRT station - Puchong Utama (operated by RapidKL)
- T602: Taman Puchong Utama - Taman Saujana Puchong (operated by RapidKL)
- T603: SP29 Puchong Prima LRT station - Taman Mas Sepang / Taman Putra Prima (operated by RapidKL)
- T604: SP26 Taman Perindustrian Puchong LRT station - Taman Sri Puchong (operated by RapidKL)
- T605: Taman Puchong Utama - SP24 IOI Puchong Jaya LRT station via Batu 14 and Bandar Puteri Puchong (operated by RapidKL)
- SJ02: KJ30 SS18 LRT station, Subang Jaya - SP25 Pusat Bandar Puchong LRT station via Sunway Pyramid (operated by Smart Selangor Bus)
- SJ03: SP22 Kinrara BK5 LRT station - Bandar Puchong Jaya (operated by Smart Selangor Bus)

=== Light Rapid Transit(LRT) ===
Under the LRT Extension Project (LEP), the Sri Petaling Line is now extended into Puchong constituency with the addition of nine new stations, namely:

- SP21 Alam Sutera;
- SP22 Kinrara BK 5;
- SP24 IOI Puchong Jaya;
- SP25 Pusat Bandar Puchong;
- SP26 Taman Perindustrian Puchong;
- SP27 Bandar Puteri;
- SP28 Puchong Perdana;
- SP29 Puchong Prima; and
- SP31 KJ37 Putra Heights.

Putra Heights station is the second interchange of the Sri Petaling Line with the Kelana Jaya Line; the other being Masjid Jamek station. This allows residents in Puchong and Subang Jaya to travel to Kuala Lumpur city centre, Petaling Jaya, Ampang, Wangsa Maju and even Gombak while avoiding traffic congestion.

=== Mass Rapid Transit (MRT) ===
The 16 Sierra station of Klang Valley MRT Putrajaya Line will be located between the 16 Sierra and Pulau Meranti suburbs of Puchong. The 16 Sierra MRT station starts operation in 16 March 2023.

=== Demand Responsive Transit (DRT) ===
Officially launched on 20 November 2023 after 3 months of trial sessions, Trek Rides is an on-demand van-hailing service that provides affordable and convenient transportation for residents of Bandar Puteri, Puchong Jaya and Bandar Kinrara, currently every way fare is RM2. The service operates from 7 am to 9 pm and can be booked through the Trek Rides mobile application via the multiple payment option.
