= Bandar Puteri Puchong =

Township in Puchong, Selangor, Malaysia

Coordinates: 3.017°N 101.624°E

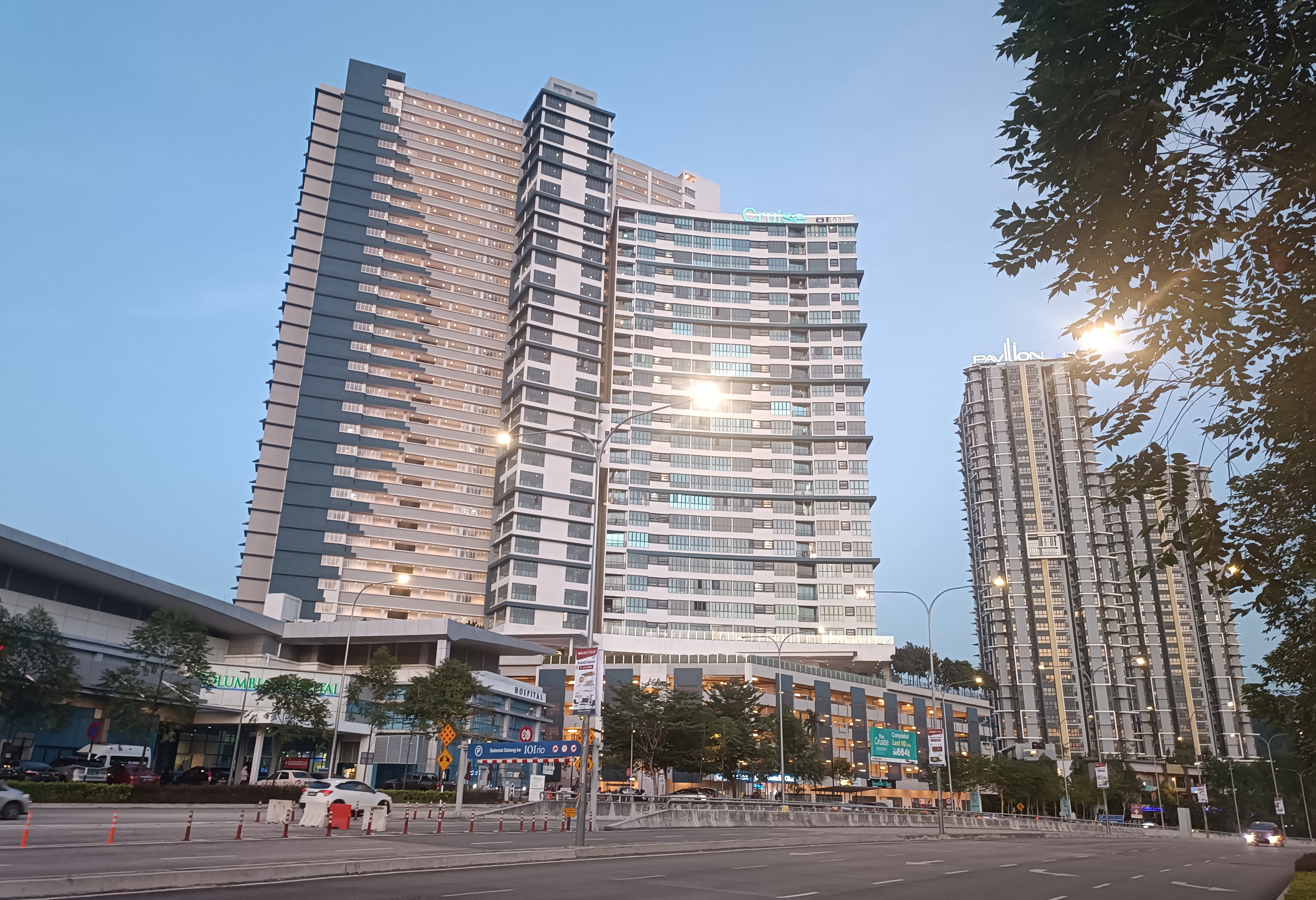
- Interactive map of Bandar Puteri Puchong
- Country: Malaysia
- State: Selangor

Government
  - Administered by: Subang Jaya City Council
- Time zone: UTC+8 (MST)
- Postal codes: 47100, 47140

Bandar Puteri Puchong is a modern residential and commercial township in Puchong, Selangor, Malaysia. Development started by the IOI Group in 1999, since then, continuous developments and infrastructure upgrades has been ongoing throughout the years.

Within the township is a bustling commercial centre filled with a variety of businesses and services, including many major banks, a variety of eateries, a wet market - Puteri Mart in Bandar Puteri 5, and a hypermarket - Hero Market, in the building where Giant used to occupy located in Bandar Puteri 1. Bank of China (M) Bhd opened its 6th branch in Malaysia at Tower 2, Puchong Financial Corporate Centre (PFCC), Puteri Puchong in 2012. There are 4 LRT station in Bandar Puteri: IOI Puchong Jaya (SP24), Pusat Bandar Puchong (SP25), Taman Perindustrian Puchong (SP26), and Bandar Puteri (SP27). All LRT stations stated here are part of Sri Petaling Line. Rapid Kl bus services are available.

The Four Points by Sheraton opened on December 2014 in Tower 3, PFCC.

IOI Group is developing IOI Rio City, a RM12 billion, 100-acre project in Bandar Puteri Puchong, aiming to create a "15-minute city." Key features include IOI Mall Rio (opening 2030), and 1,600 residential and commercial units within five years, starting with the 632-unit IOI Rio serviced apartments in 2025. The development emphasizes sustainability with EV chargers, solar panels, and rainwater harvesting. It will improve connectivity via walkways, bicycle lanes, and links to LRT stations. Designed with inspiration from Singapore's urban planning, it focuses on community and addresses local needs like flood mitigation.

== Completed Projects of IOI Rio City Plan ==
- The Cruise Residence - 324-unit serviced apartment and 8 retail lots opened in 2022
- IOI Rio Exchange - completed offices and retail in 2021

== Commerce ==
Bandar Puteri Puchong is the center for numerous banking facilities, and they are all in walking distance from one another. The banks in this location are:

- Alliance Bank
- Citibank (Now defunct; replaced by UOB)
- Maybank
- CIMB
- Standard Chartered
- RHB
- Bank of China
- OCBC
- Public Bank
- Hong Leong Bank
- Affin Bank
- Bank Simpanan Nasional
