= Bandar Putra Permai =

Township in Selangor, Malaysia

- Township
- Giant Hypermarket Seri Kembangan is a major landmark in the township.

- Location of Bandar Putra Permai in Selangor Bandar Putra Permai (Malaysia)
- Coordinates: 2.9833°N 101.6667°E
- Country: Malaysia
- State: Selangor
- District: Petaling District
- Local government: Subang Jaya City Council (MBSJ)
- Master Developer: Global Oriental Berhad
- Postcode: 43300
- Area code: +6-03

Bandar Putra Permai is a master township located in Seri Kembangan, Petaling District, Selangor, Malaysia. Geographically situated in the southern part of Seri Kembangan, it serves as a major residential and commercial hub bordering Puchong to the west, Putrajaya to the south, and Bukit Jalil to the north.

The township is a massive mixed development that encompasses several neighbourhoods and sub-townships, including Taman Equine, Taman Lestari Perdana, and Kota Perdana. It falls under the jurisdiction of the Subang Jaya City Council (MBSJ).

== History and development ==
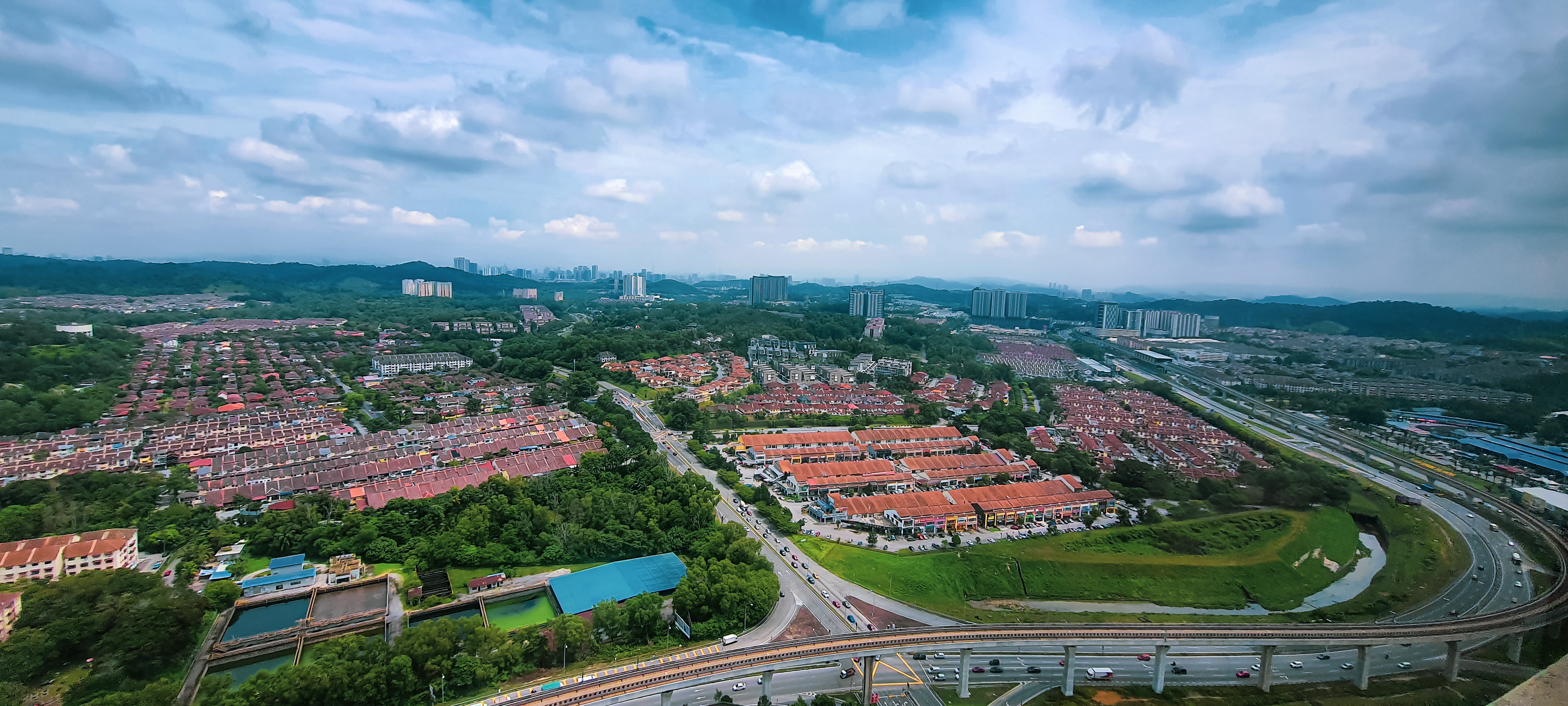
An aerial view of Bandar Putra Permai, facing north towards Kuala Lumpur. The MRT Putrajaya Line can be seen running along Jalan Putra Permai.

Bandar Putra Permai was developed primarily by Global Oriental Berhad (formerly Equine Capital Berhad) in the 1990s as a satellite township. The master plan was designed to integrate residential, commercial, and recreational components into a self-contained hub within the Multimedia Super Corridor (MSC).

The development was officially launched in April 2002 by the then Menteri Besar of Selangor, Khir Toyo. Ideally located to cater to the growing population in the southern Klang Valley corridor, it consists of three flagship components:

- Putra Permai (Mixed residential and shop offices)
- Pusat Bandar Putra Permai (The Town Centre and amenities hub)
- Taman Equine (Premium residential enclave)

== Township layout ==
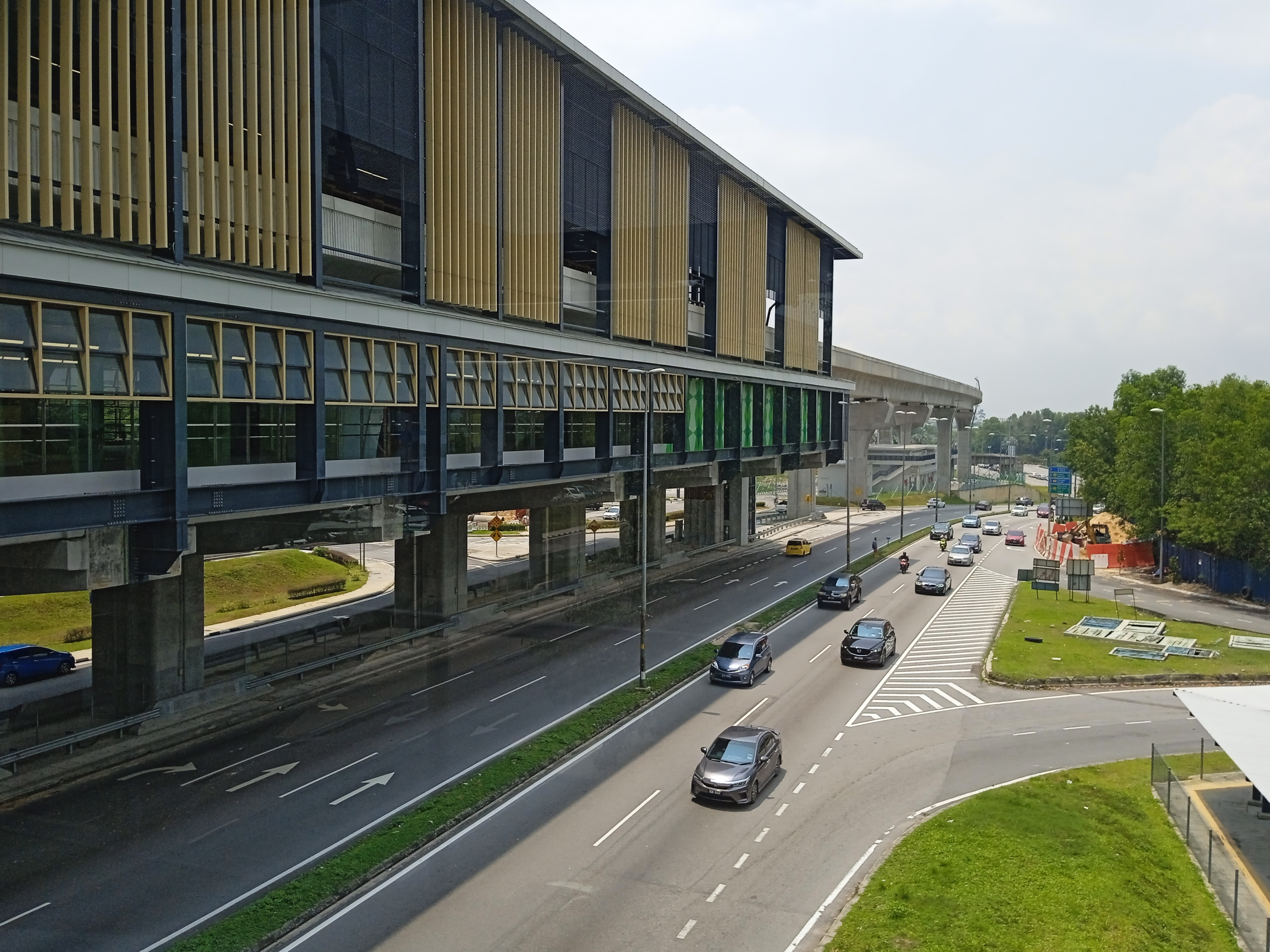
Jalan Seri Kembangan, part of Malaysia Federal Route 3215 at Bandar Putra Permai, towards to 16 Sierra and LDP

According to the master development plan, the township is divided into distinct zones connected by the central spine road, Jalan Putra Permai, and Persiaran Equine Perdana.

=== Pusat Bandar Putra Permai (Town Centre) ===
Located in the southern sector of the township, this area functions as the primary hub for public amenities and community facilities. Key components include:

- Pasar Borong Selangor (Selangor Wholesale Market): A major regional fresh produce hub.
- Bazaar Rakyat: A dedicated bazaar area for local traders.
- Permai Square: A commercial square serving the immediate community.
- The Rise: A residential phase featuring semi-detached homes.
- Educational facilities, including primary and secondary schools.

=== Putra Permai ===
The central zone of the township is situated along the main arterial road. This area is characterised by higher-density living and commercial activities, including:

- Apartments: Several clusters of low-medium and medium-cost apartments.
- Shop Offices: Rows of completed commercial shop lots.
- Fast Food Outlets: Drive-through facilities and restaurants.

=== Taman Equine ===
Located in the eastern sector, Taman Equine is the upscale residential component featuring the Equine Boulevard, Equine Square, and the township's primary retail centres (AEON Mall).

== Economy and facilities ==
The township has evolved into a significant commercial hub for Seri Kembangan.

=== Retail and commerce ===
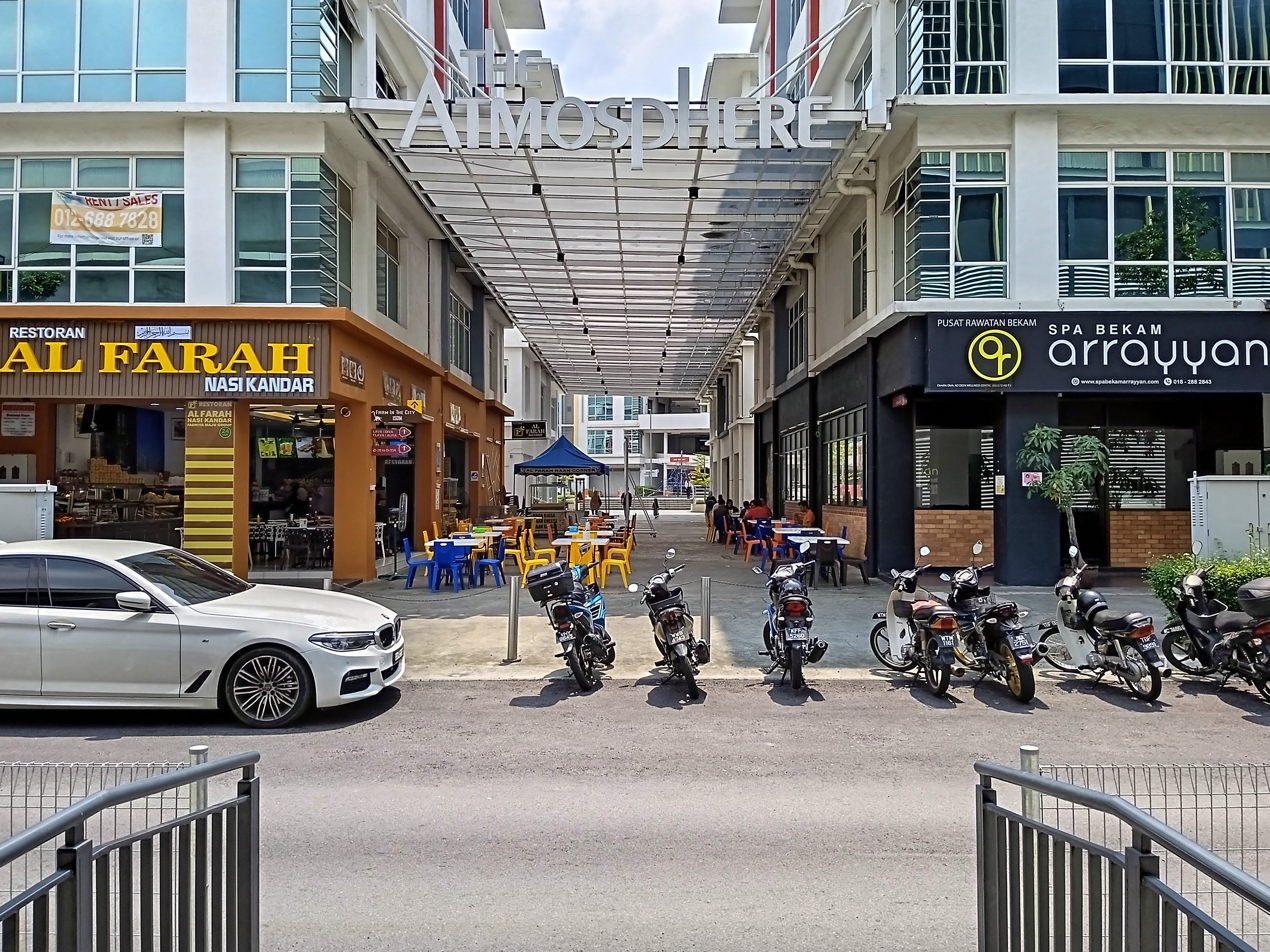
The Atmosphere commercial area

- Pasar Borong Selangor: A major 24-hour wholesale market serving the Klang Valley.
- Giant Hypermarket Seri Kembangan: One of the main anchors of the area.
- AEON Mall Taman Equine: A shopping mall serving the residents of the township and nearby Puchong.
- The Atmosphere: An integrated commercial development known for its artsy murals and office suites.
- Putra Walk: A commercial street featuring various eateries and services.

=== Education ===
Bandar Putra Permai is an education hub hosting several institutions:

- Alice Smith School (Secondary Campus): An international school located in Taman Equine.
- SMK Taman Desaminium and SK Taman Desaminium
- SJK (C) Bukit Serdang
- Nearby tertiary institutions include Universiti Putra Malaysia (UPM) in the adjacent Serdang area.

== Transport ==
Bandar Putra Permai is highly accessible via a network of highways and modern rail transit.

=== Public transportation ===
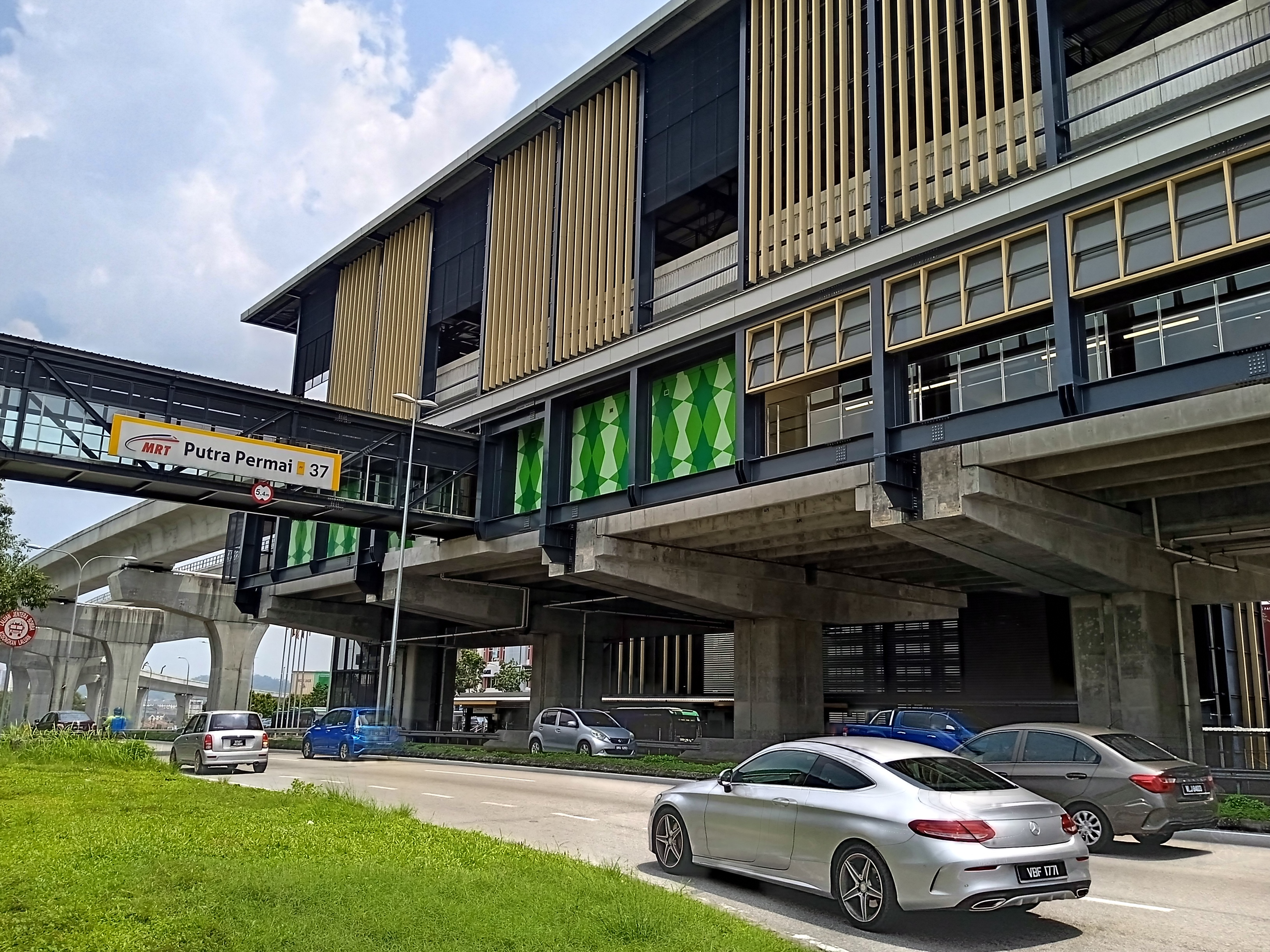
Putra Permai MRT station served the MRT Putrajaya Line

Bandar Putra Permai is well-served by the 12 MRT Putrajaya Line, which commenced full operations in 2023. Two stations serve the area:

- PY36 Taman Equine MRT station
- PY37 Putra Permai MRT station

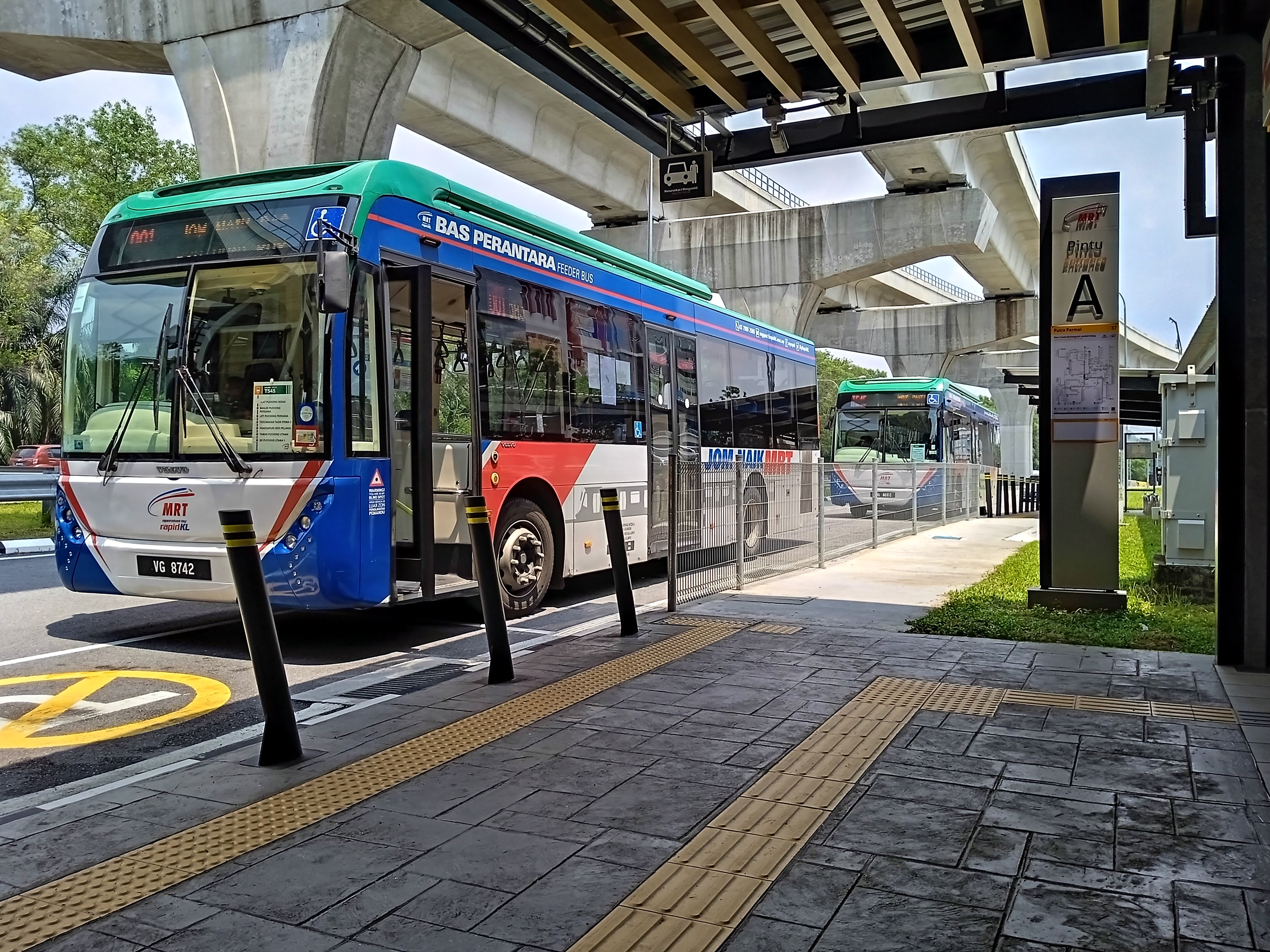
MRT Putra Permai Entrance A bus lay-by (Hentian Bas MRT Putra Permai Pintu A) served Rapid KL MRT Feeder Bus routes

Bus services provided by Rapid KL include:

- 540: Putra Permai to Hub Lebuh Pudu, Kuala Lumpur (discontinued).
- 541: Taman Equine MRT Station to Kinrara BK5 LRT station.
- T542: MRT Taman Equine bus hub to Taman Pinggiran Putra (discontinued).
- T543: MRT Taman Equine bus hub to Taman Lestari Perdana and Puncak Jalil.
- T544: MRT Putra Permai bus hub to Taman Lestari Putra
- T545: MRT Putra Permai bus hub to Terminal Puchong Utama

=== Highways ===
The township provides connectivity to the greater Klang Valley via major expressways:

- Maju Expressway (MEX): Provides direct access to Kuala Lumpur and KLIA. (Labelled as the "Proposed KL/KUA Dedicated Highway" in early master plans).
- Damansara–Puchong Expressway (LDP): Connects the township to Puchong and Petaling Jaya.
- Bukit Jalil Highway (Puchong–Sungai Besi Highway): Connects to Bukit Jalil and Bandar Kinrara via a dedicated link road.
- South Klang Valley Expressway (SKVE).
