= Puncak Jalil =

Township in Selangor, Malaysia

Puncak Jalil Taman Puncak Jalil
- Township
- Location of Puncak Jalil in Selangor Puncak Jalil (Malaysia)
- Coordinates: 3.017074°N 101.6755268°E
- Country: Malaysia
- State: Selangor
- District: Petaling District
- Local government: Subang Jaya City Council (MBSJ)
- Developer: Maxisegar Sdn Bhd (Talam); Revived by IJM Corporation

Area
  - Total: 324 ha (801 acres)
- Postcode: 43300
- Area code: +6-03

Puncak Jalil (formerly known as Bandar Seri Bukit Jalil) is an integrated township located in Seri Kembangan, Petaling District, Selangor, Malaysia. Spanning 801 acres (324 ha) of leasehold land, it is situated along Federal Route 217 (Bukit Jalil Highway), directly adjacent to Bukit Jalil to the north, Bandar Kinrara to the northwest, and Taman Equine to the south. The township falls under the jurisdiction of the Subang Jaya City Council (MBSJ).

== History ==
The township was originally launched in June 2001 under the name Bandar Seri Bukit Jalil by Maxisegar Sdn Bhd, a wholly-owned subsidiary of Talam Corporation. Envisioned as a self-contained township comprising 11,651 residential and commercial units, the project boasted an estimated Gross Development Value (GDV) of RM2.5 billion. Early interest in the project was strong due to its strategic proximity to Technology Park Malaysia (TPM) and the National Sports Complex; by January 2003, the developer had recorded sales of over 6,300 units valued at RM1.3 billion.

However, by the mid-2000s, Talam Corporation encountered severe financial difficulties, causing construction across its portfolio to stall. Puncak Jalil, along with the adjacent Lestari Perdana township, was left in a state of abandonment. For several years, the area was plagued by uncompleted infrastructure, potholes, and a lack of street lighting, earning it a reputation among property investors as a "wasteland" or "ghost town". Residents faced numerous issues, including unfulfilled promises regarding highway interchanges and the surrender of land banks to the state government for debt settlement.

In 2006, as part of a government-backed rescue scheme, IJM Corporation (via IJM Land) was appointed to take over the management and completion of Talam's stalled projects. Under IJM's rehabilitation, infrastructure works were resumed, landscaping was improved, and the abandoned phases were gradually completed and handed over to buyers by 2009.

== Environmental issues ==
During the initial habitation period circa 2005, the township faced significant environmental challenges due to its proximity to the Ayer Hitam Sanitary Landfill. The landfill was located directly adjacent to the residential borders of Puncak Jalil and Taman Equine, with some units situated as close as 300 metres from the waste mounds. Residents frequently reported foul odours and wind-blown litter affecting their quality of life. In December 2005, the community organised a petition demanding the landfill's closure, citing health risks and poor land-use planning. The landfill operations have since ceased, and the area is undergoing rehabilitation.

== Master plan and residential phases ==
Puncak Jalil features an elongated north-south layout connected by the central spine road, Persiaran Puncak Jalil. The master plan segregates the township into distinct sectors based on topography. The Northern Sector, located on higher ground near the border of Technology Park Malaysia, comprises primarily landed properties including terrace houses and semi-detached units. Phases in this sector include Hazel Ville (Phase 8), Iris Ville (Phase 9A), and Ivia Ville (Phase 9E).

The Southern Sector, which connects to Lestari Perdana and Seri Kembangan, features a mix of high-density apartments and terrace housing. Notable phases in this area include Doris Ville (Phase 4A/4B), Flores Ville (Phase 6B), and the Casa Riana apartments (Phase 16). The township also includes a central commercial hub near Phase 6 and 9, which was originally designated for a hypermarket and is now occupied by Mydin and various shop offices.

== Transportation ==
The township is situated in a strategic corridor between Kuala Lumpur and Putrajaya, accessible via a network of highways. The Maju Expressway (MEX) forms the eastern boundary of the township, with the Seri Kembangan interchange providing direct access to the city centre. The Bukit Jalil Highway (Federal Route 217) connects the township to Puchong and the Damansara–Puchong Expressway (LDP) to the west.

While there is no rail station directly within the township, it is served by the Taman Equine MRT station (MRT Putrajaya Line) located to the south, and the Alam Sutera LRT station (LRT Sri Petaling Line) to the north.
