= Selangor State Route B11 =

Road in Malaysia

Selangor Route 11
- Jalan Kajang–Puchong
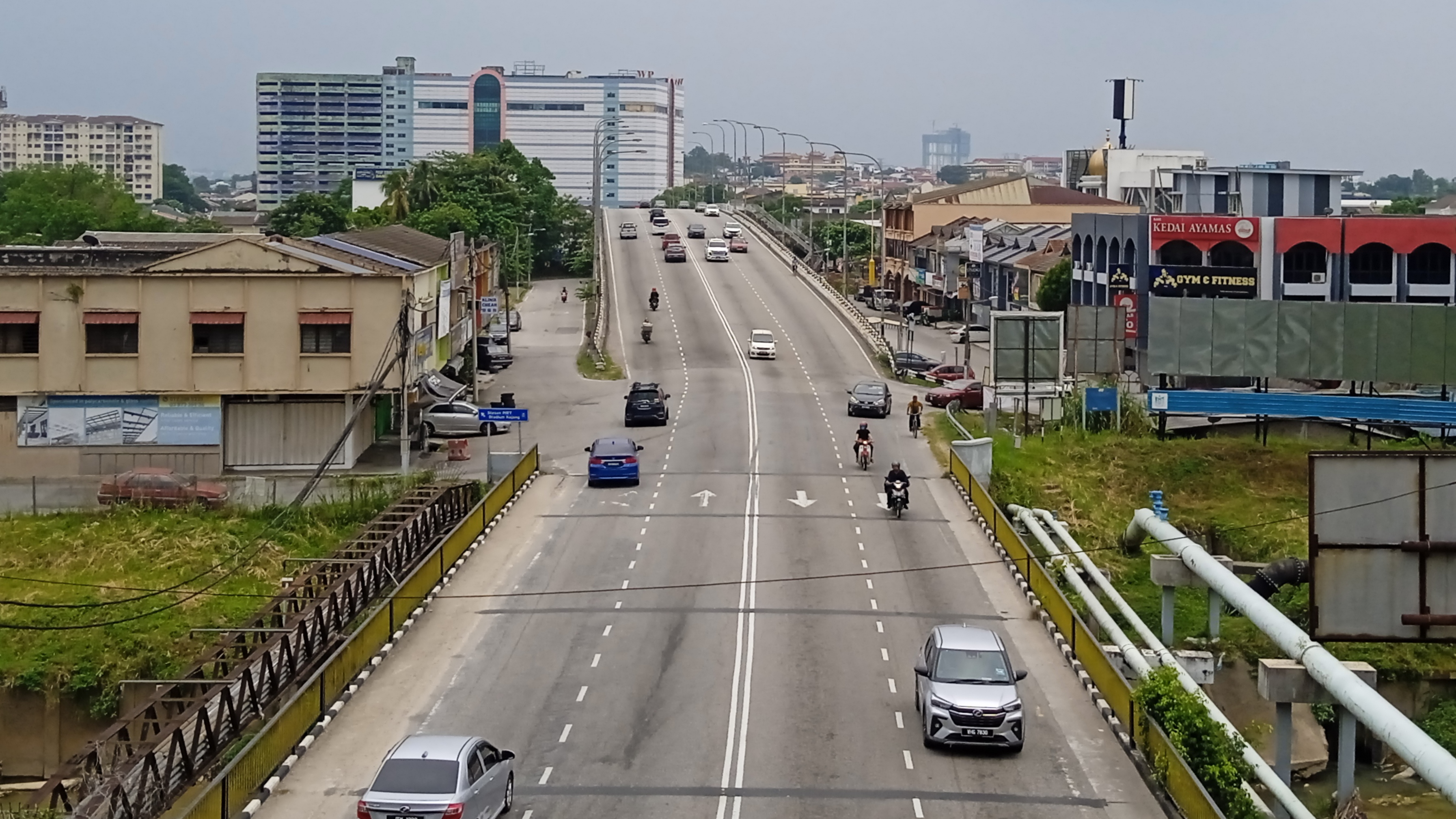

Major junctions
- West end: Serdang Interchange
- FT 3215 Jalan Seri Kembangan; Damansara–Puchong Expressway; FT 29 Putrajaya–Cyberjaya Expressway; South Klang Valley Expressway; Kajang Dispersal Link Expressway; B13 Jalan Uniten–Dengkil; FT 1 Federal Route 1 B17 Jalan Reko
- East end: Kajang

Location
- Country: Malaysia
- Primary destinations: Puchong, Putrajaya, Cyberjaya, Dengkil

Highway system
- Highways in Malaysia; Expressways; Federal; State

Jalan Kajang–Puchong or Jalan Sungai Chua on Kajang town side (Selangor State Route B11) is a major road in Selangor, Malaysia.

== Junction lists ==
The entire route is located in Selangor.

Legend:

- I/C - Interchange, I/S - Intersection, RSA - Rest and service area, OBR - Overhead bridge restaurant, R/R - Restaurant and rest plaza, L/B - Layby, V/P - Vista point, TN - tunnel, T/P - Toll plaza, BR - Bridge
- C - Cloverleaf, S - Stack, T-A - Trumpet-A, T-B - Trumpet-B, DT - Directional-T/Y, SDT - Semi-Directional-T/Y, P-Y - Partial-Y, D - Diamond, P-C - Partial cloverleaf, D-D - Diverging diamond, D-R - Direct ramp

District	Location	km	mi	Exit	Name	Destinations	Notes
Petaling–Sepang district border				Jalan Puchong–Petaling Jaya; Jalan Puchong–Dengkil; Serdang I/C–Putrajaya/Cyberjaya I/C; Damansara–Puchong Expressway / FT 29 (Putrajaya–Cyberjaya Expressway)			
Sepang–Hulu Langat district border				Putrajaya/Cyberjaya I/C–Uniten see also South Klang Valley Expressway			
Hulu Langat	Sungai Chua			1809	Uniten	Kajang Dispersal Link Expressway – Kuala Lumpur, Sungai Besi, Mines Resort City, Seri Kembangan, Kajang, Semenyih; B13 Jalan Uniten–Dengkil – Universiti Tenaga Nasional (Uniten), Dengkil	Cloverleaf interchange
Hulu Langat	Sungai Chua				Uniten–Sungai Chua	see also Kajang Dispersal Link Expressway	
Hulu Langat	Sungai Chua			1812	Sungai Chua	Kampung Sungai Chua; Kajang Dispersal Link Expressway – Cheras, Kajang, Kuala Lumpur	Diamond interchange
Hulu Langat	Sungai Chua				Kampung Baru Sungai Chua		
Hulu Langat	Kajang				Jalan 7/1	Jalan 7/1 – Taman Seri Saga, Taman Setia, Taman Kajang Indah, Taman Kajang Raya, Taman Berjaya Baru, Taman Koperatif Lin	T-junctions
Hulu Langat	Kajang				Taman Sungai Kota		
Hulu Langat	Kajang				Taman Hijau		
Hulu Langat	Kajang			Railway crossing bridge			
Hulu Langat	Kajang				Taman Jambu		
Hulu Langat	Kajang			Sungai Langat bridge			
Hulu Langat	Kajang				Stadium Kajang MRT station	P&R Stadium Kajang MRT station 9	
Hulu Langat	Kajang				Jalan Stadium	Jalan Stadium – Stadium Kajang, Medan Sate Kajang	T-junctions
Hulu Langat	Kajang				Kajang	FT 1 Malaysia Federal Route 1 (Jalan Cheras–Kajang/Jalan Semenyih) – Kuala Lumpur, Cheras, Semenyih, Seremban; B17 Selangor State Route B17 – Bangi, Universiti Kebangsaan Malaysia (UKM), KTM ETS Kajang station	Junctions
1.000 mi = 1.609 km; 1.000 km = 0.621 mi: Concurrency terminus
