= Putra Permai MRT station =

Metro station in Selangor, Malaysia

PY37 Putra Permai
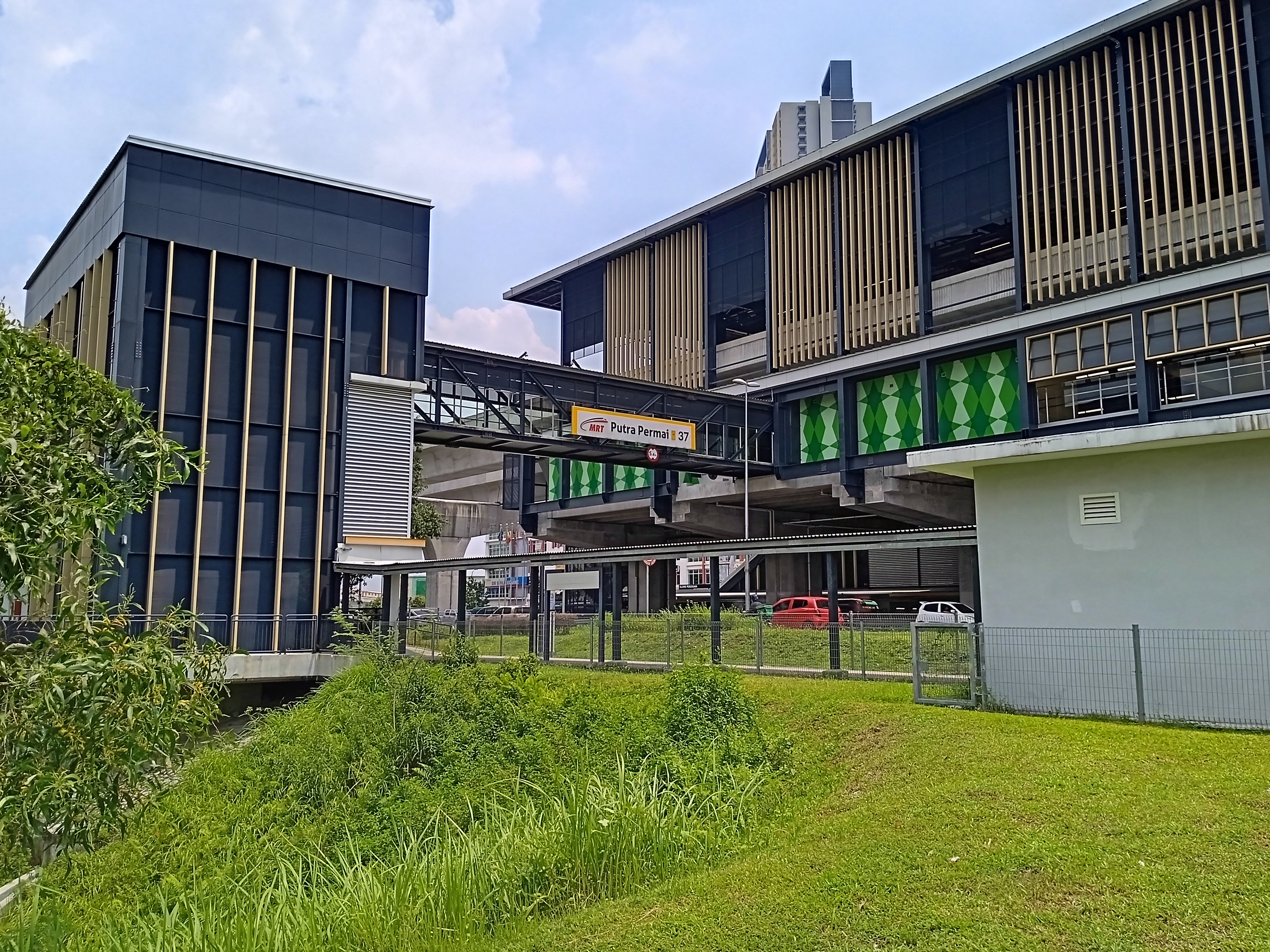
- Station view from Jalan Seri Kembangan

General information
- Other names: Malay: ڤوترا ڤرماي (Jawi); Chinese: 布特拉柏迈; Tamil: புத்ரா பெர்மாய்
- Location: Jalan Seri Kembangan, Bandar Putra Permai, 43400 Seri Kembangan; Selangor; Malaysia
- System: Rapid KL
- Owner: MRT Corp
- Operator: Rapid Rail
- Line: 12 Putrajaya Line
- Platforms: 1 island platform
- Tracks: 2

Construction
- Accessible: Yes

Other information
- Status: Operational
- Station code: PY37

History
- Opened: 16 March 2023; 3 years ago

Services
Preceding station		Following station
Taman Equine towards Kwasa Damansara	Putrajaya Line	16 Sierra towards Putrajaya Sentral
Location

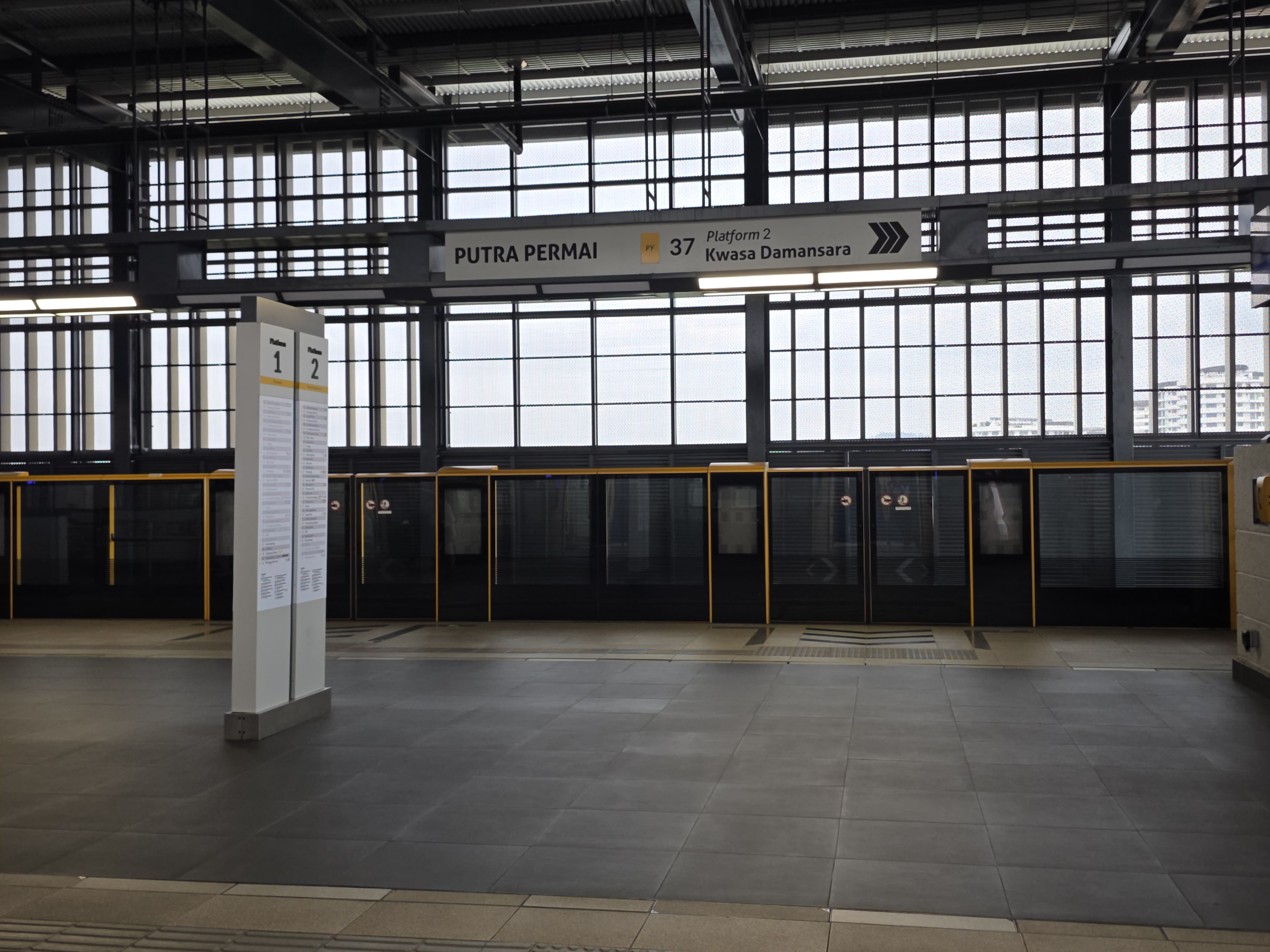
Station's platform level

The Putra Permai MRT station is a mass rapid transit (MRT) station that serves the suburb of Bandar Putra Permai in Selangor, Malaysia. It is one of the stations built as part of the Klang Valley Mass Rapid Transit (KVMRT) project on the MRT Putrajaya Line.

== Location ==
The station is located on Jalan Seri Kembangan near The Atmosphere, a mixed development in Seri Kembangan. Places of interest such as Giant Hypermarket Seri Kembangan and Farm In The City (a petting zoo) are accessible within walking distance from the station.

== Bus Services ==
=== Feeder buses ===
Route No.	Origin	Desitination	Via	Connecting to
T544	PY37 Putra Permai (Entrance A)	Taman Lestari Putra	Jalan Atmosphere Utama; Farm In The City; Persiaran Lestari Perdana; Jalan KP 1/1; Persiaran Kota Perdana; Persiaran Lestari Putra; Jalan LEP 6	T545
T545	PY37 Putra Permai (Entrance A)	Puchong Utama	Puchong Indah; SP28 Puchong Perdana	503, 600, 601, 608, T602
