= Selangor State Route B17 =

Road in Malaysia

Selangor Route 17
- Jalan Reko/Jalan Bandar Baru Bangi 流古路/万宜新镇路

Major junctions
- North end: Kajang
- FT 1 Federal Route 1 B11 State Route B11; Kajang Dispersal Link Expressway; FT 31 Federal Route 31
- South end: Bangi

Location
- Country: Malaysia
- Primary destinations: Universiti Kebangsaan Malaysia, Bandar Baru Bangi, Dengkil

Highway system
- Highways in Malaysia; Expressways; Federal; State

Selangor State Route B17, Jalan Reko (Chinese: 流古路) or Jalan Bandar Baru Bangi (Chinese: 万宜新镇路) is a major road in Selangor, Malaysia.

== History ==
=== Upgrading project ===
==== Phase 2 ====
The B17 Jalan Reko upgrading project involved 3.54 km (2.20 mi) stretch from Sungai Tangkas to Jalan Reko Community Hall, near to the E18 Kajang Dispersal Link Expressway interchange. The project will start in November 2025 and complete in March 2028. The project aimed to prevent the flood in this road.

== Junction lists ==
The entire route is located in Hulu Langat District, Selangor.

Legend:

- I/C - Interchange, I/S - Intersection, RSA - Rest and service area, OBR - Overhead bridge restaurant, R/R - Restaurant and rest plaza, L/B - Layby, V/P - Vista point, TN - tunnel, T/P - Toll plaza, BR - Bridge
- C - Cloverleaf, S - Stack, T-A - Trumpet-A, T-B - Trumpet-B, DT - Directional-T/Y, SDT - Semi-Directional-T/Y, P-Y - Partial-Y, D - Diamond, P-C - Partial cloverleaf, D-D - Diverging diamond, D-R - Direct ramp

Location	km	mi	Name	Destinations	Notes
Kajang			Kajang; Kajang Stadium	B11 Selangor State Route B11 – Sungai Chua; Kajang Dispersal Link Expressway – Putrajaya, Cyberjaya, Puchong; FT 1 Malaysia Federal Route 1 – Kuala Lumpur, Cheras, Balakong, Semenyih, Seremban	Junctions
Kajang			Kajang		
Kajang			Railway crossing bridge		
Kajang			Kajang station	P&R Kajang station 9 KTM ETS KTM Komuter	
Kajang			Kampung Reko	Kajang Dispersal Link Expressway – Putrajaya, Cyberjaya, Puchong, Sungai Long, Seremban, Semenyih	Parcelo interchange
Kajang			Taman Kajang Prima		T-junctions
Kajang			Reko Industrial Area		T-junctions
Kajang			Taman Sri Intan		T-junctions
Kajang			Persiaran Bangi	Persiaran Bangi – Bandar Baru Bangi	Half-diamond interchange
Kajang			Kajang 2 station	P&R Kajang 2 station KTM Komuter	
Bangi			UKM Recreational Club		T-junctions
Bangi			Universiti Kebangsaan Malaysia	Persiaran Universiti – Bandar Baru Bangi, Universiti Kebangsaan Malaysia; North–South Expressway Southern Route – Kuala Lumpur, Petaling Jaya, Kuala Lumpur International Airport, Seremban, Malacca, Johor Bahru	Junctions
Bangi			Malay Heritage Museum	Malay Heritage Museum (Muzium Warisan Melayu) –	
Bangi			Kampung Teras Jenang	Jalan Teras Jenang – Bandar Baru Bangi; North–South Expressway Southern Route – Kuala Lumpur, Petaling Jaya, Kuala Lumpur International Airport, Seremban, Malacca, Johor Bahru	T-junctions
Bangi			Bangi Chinese Cemetery		
Bangi			Malaysian Nuclear Agency	Malaysian Institute of Nuclear Technology Research (MINT) (Malaysian Nuclear Agency)	T-junctions
Bangi			Bangi	FT 31 Malaysia Federal Route 31 – Dengkil, Putrajaya, Cyberjaya, Kuala Lumpur International Airport, Sepang, Banting, Bangi, Semenyih; Kajang–Seremban Highway – Kuala Lumpur, Seremban	T-junctions
1.000 mi = 1.609 km; 1.000 km = 0.621 mi
