= LLM Lettering =

- Category: Sans-serif
- Classification: Grotesque
- Designer: A. Wahid
- Commissioned by: Malaysian Highway Authority
- Foundry: N/A
- Variations: LLM Narrow (condensed)
- Sample
- Latest release version: 2.00
- Latest release date: 26 March 2015

Condensed variant (LLM Narrow) typeface sample.

LLM Lettering is a set of sans-serif typefaces developed by the Malaysian Highway Authority (Malay: Lembaga Lebuhraya Malaysia, LLM) and used for road signage on expressways in Malaysia. The font was divided into two types: LLM Normal (Standard/Regular) and LLM Narrow (Condensed). The LLM Normal typeface is a modified form of the Italian Alfabeto Normale and Alfabeto Stretto. The lettering is special use for the Malaysian Expressway System.

== Examples on Malaysian road signs ==
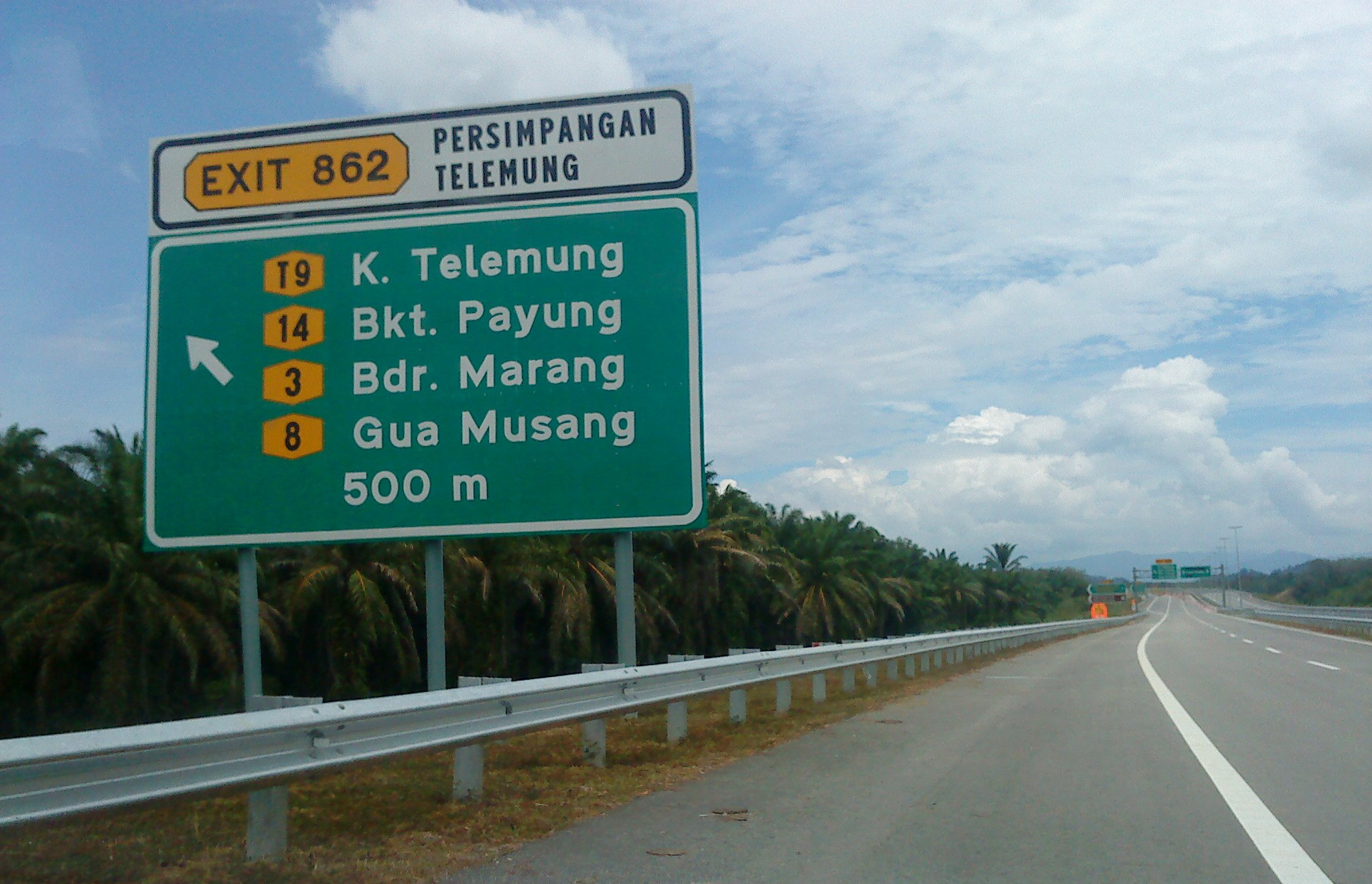
Expressway exit sign at East Coast Expressway using both LLM Normal and LLM Narrow

Temporary sign to Second Penang Bridge, using LLM Narrow

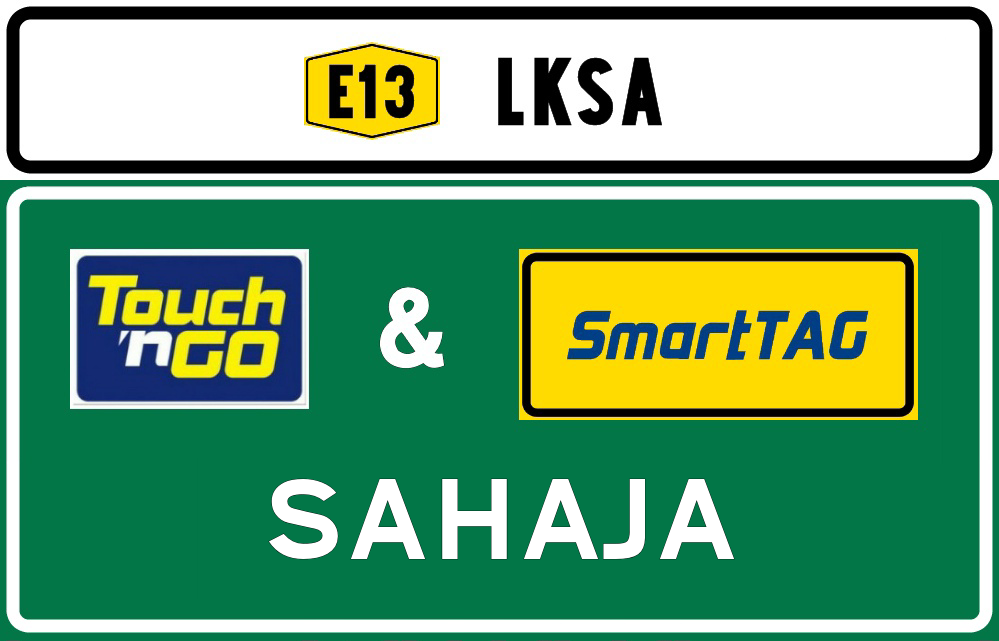
This expressway accept ETC only, using LLM Narrow & LLM Normal

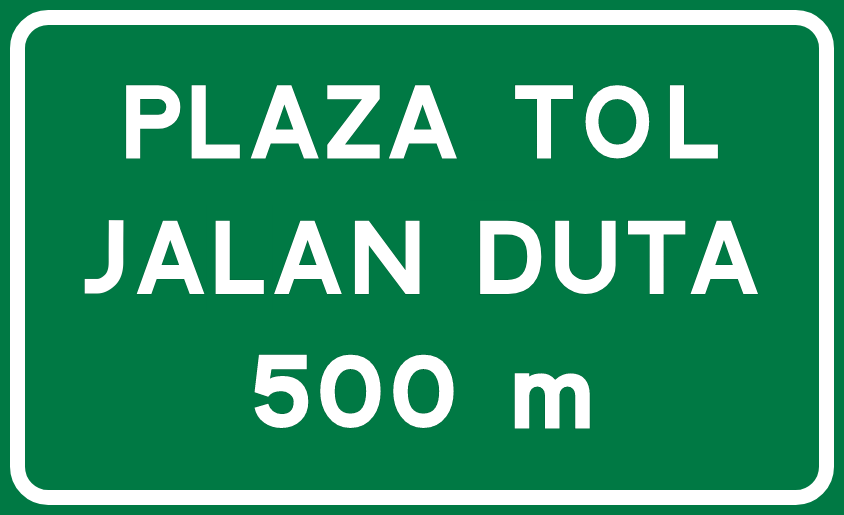
Toll plaza 500 meters ahead with name, using LLM Normal

== See also ==
- FHWA Series, a global format sign font, also used for old format signs in Malaysia
- Transport (typeface), used in Europe and for the new format signs of the Malaysian Public Works Department
