= Equine Park =

Township in Selangor, Malaysia

Equine Park Taman Equine
- Township
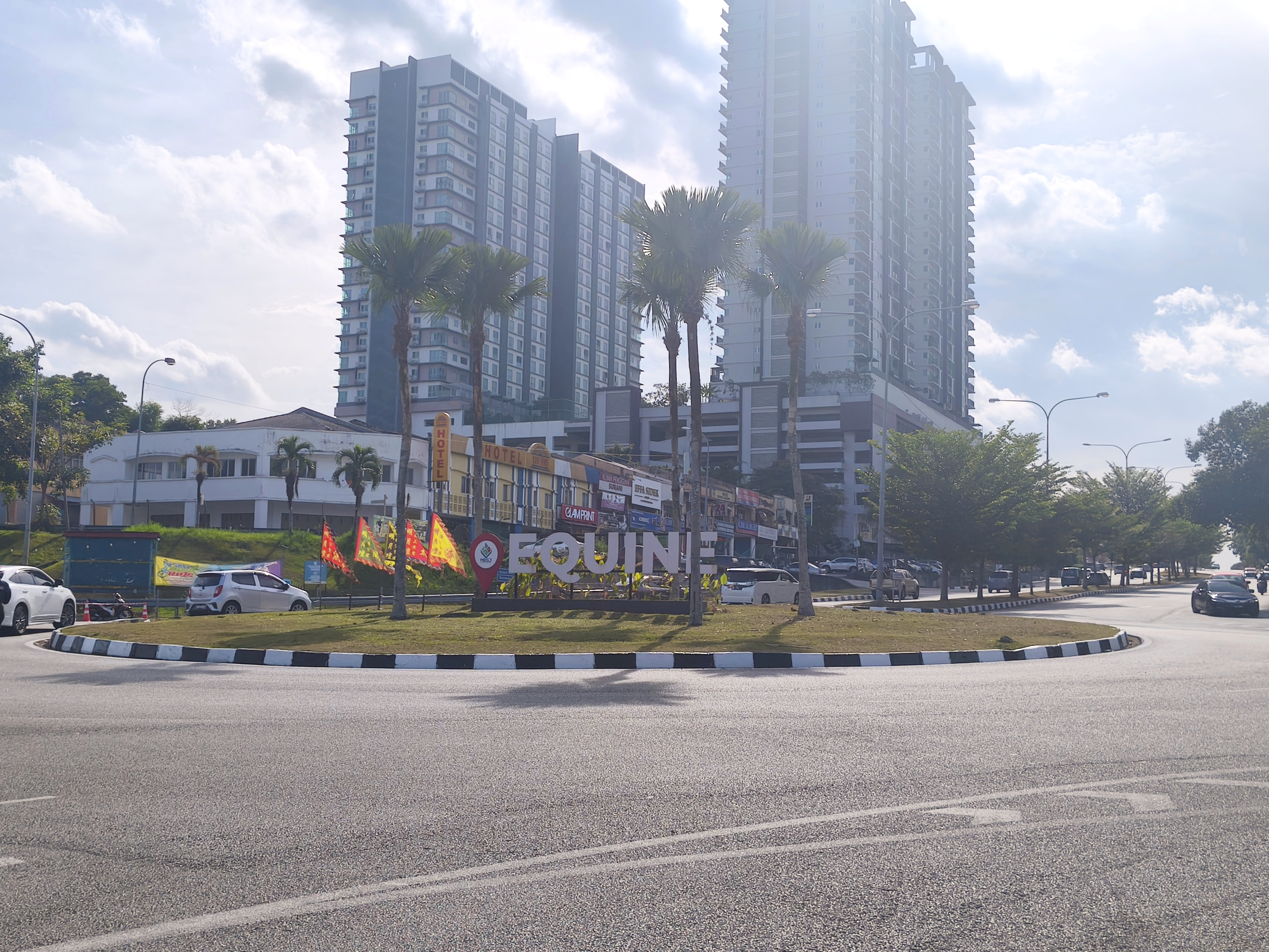
- Equine Park Roundabout
- Location in Selangor
- Location of Taman Equine in Selangor Equine Park (Malaysia)
- Coordinates: 2.9935°N 101.6745°E
- Country: Malaysia
- State: Selangor
- District: Petaling District
- Local government: Subang Jaya City Council (MBSJ)
- Established: 1994
- Postcode: 43300
- Area code: +6-03

Taman Equine (also known as Equine Park; Chinese: 怡观园) is a satellite township located in the southern part of Seri Kembangan, in the Petaling District of Selangor, Malaysia. It falls under the jurisdiction of the Subang Jaya City Council (MBSJ). Situated east of Puchong, south of Bukit Jalil, and north of Putrajaya, it is one of the three core components of the Bandar Putra Permai development (alongside Putra Permai and Pusat Bandar Putra Permai). The township was developed by Global Oriental Berhad (formerly known as Equine Capital Berhad).

== History and development ==
The history of Taman Equine dates back to the early 1990s. In May 1992, the project development company, Taman Equine (M) Sdn Bhd, was officially incorporated. In July 1994, the developer acquired approximately 550 acres of leasehold land in Seri Kembangan, officially launching the master plan for Taman Equine and Bandar Putra Permai.

The township derives its name from its predecessor, the Royal Selangor Equestrian Academy (Akademi Ekuestrian DiRaja Selangor). The academy was granted the "Royal" title by the then Sultan of Selangor, Sultan Salahuddin Abdul Aziz Shah, in September 1997, becoming Malaysia's first fully equipped equestrian academy. Although the academy is no longer in operation, the name "Equine" was retained as the township's identity.

Taman Equine is part of the broader Bandar Putra Permai township, which spans from Puncak Jalil to the Bandar Putra Permai town centre. The developer, originally named Equine Capital Berhad (ECB), was led by executive chairman Datuk Patrick Lim Soo Kit during the administration of Prime Minister Abdullah Ahmad Badawi in the early 2000s. The group was successfully listed on the Main Board of Bursa Malaysia on 28 October 2003. Following political and corporate changes, the company underwent restructuring and was renamed Global Oriental Berhad (GOB), continuing to hold and develop the remaining land bank in the area.

A significant milestone occurred in April 2002, when the then Menteri Besar of Selangor, Khir Toyo, and the Subang Jaya Municipal Council President, Ahmad Fuad Ismail, officiated the launch of Bandar Putra Permai. On the same day, the Dr George Lim Ah Soo Recreational Park & Community Hall (Taman Rekreasi & Dewan Orang Ramai Dr George Lim Ah Soo) was opened. Initially characterized by low-density semi-detached houses and bungalows, the area began seeing more high-rise service apartments and commercial developments in the 2010s, driven by improved infrastructure and the opening of the MRT Putrajaya Line.

== Commercial and community facilities ==
Taman Equine has evolved into a mature commercial hub for southern Seri Kembangan. The area's landmark is the AEON Mall Taman Equine, which opened in 2006. It serves as the primary shopping destination for local residents as well as those from Putra Heights and southern Puchong.

The Equine Boulevard commercial area hosts major bank branches, including Maybank, CIMB Bank, and Public Bank Berhad, along with numerous food and beverage chains. The Renai Hotel (formerly G Hotel) provides business accommodation within the district.

In terms of education, the township is home to the Alice Smith School, which purchased land from the developer in 1996 to build its secondary campus, establishing the area as an educational hub. For daily necessities, the township is adjacent to the Selangor Wholesale Market (Pasar Borong Selangor) and Giant Hypermarket Seri Kembangan.

== Residential development ==
With the introduction of the MRT line, the real estate market in Taman Equine has gained traction. Besides early landed properties, recent high-rise residential projects include:

- Galleria 1 & 2: High-rise service apartments.
- Springville Residence: Condominiums located opposite the Alice Smith School.
- Villa Heights: A low-density community of semi-detached bungalows.
- Equine Residence
- One Equine: A large integrated development next to Taman Equine, which saw strong demand during its launch.
- KAIA Heights

== Transport ==
Taman Equine is well-connected by a network of highways and public transport, contributing to its popularity as a residential area.

=== Roads ===
Residents can access major expressways via Jalan Putra Permai:

- Maju Expressway (MEX): Direct access to Kuala Lumpur City Centre, Tun Razak Exchange (TRX) and Kuala Lumpur International Airport (KLIA).
- South Klang Valley Expressway (SKVE): Connects to Port Klang and Kajang.
- Damansara–Puchong Expressway (LDP): Connects to Puchong, Bandar Sunway and Petaling Jaya.

=== Rail ===
The township is served by the PY36 Taman Equine MRT station, which opened on 16 March 2023. The station is part of the 12 MRT Putrajaya Line and features a "Park and ride" facility, facilitating commuters travelling to Putrajaya and Kuala Lumpur.

=== Bus services ===
The Taman Equine MRT station serves as a regional bus hub with several feeder and ordinary bus routes:

- MRT Feeder Buses:
  - T543: To Puncak Jalil and PPR Pinggiran Bukit Jalil.
- Stage Buses:
  - 540: KTM Serdang – Putra Permai.
  - 541: LRT Kinrara BK5 – Putra Permai.
- Smart Selangor Bus:
  - SJ05: Putra Permai – Taman Bukit Serdang.
- DRT Service:
  - T542B: A demand-responsive transport service operated by Rapid KL, covering Taman Equine and surrounding areas via app booking.

== See also ==
- Seri Kembangan
- Bandar Putra Permai
