= Malaysia Federal Route 3215 =

Road in Malaysia

Federal Route 3215
- Jalan Seri Kembangan (Jalan Putra Permai) (Jalan Besar)
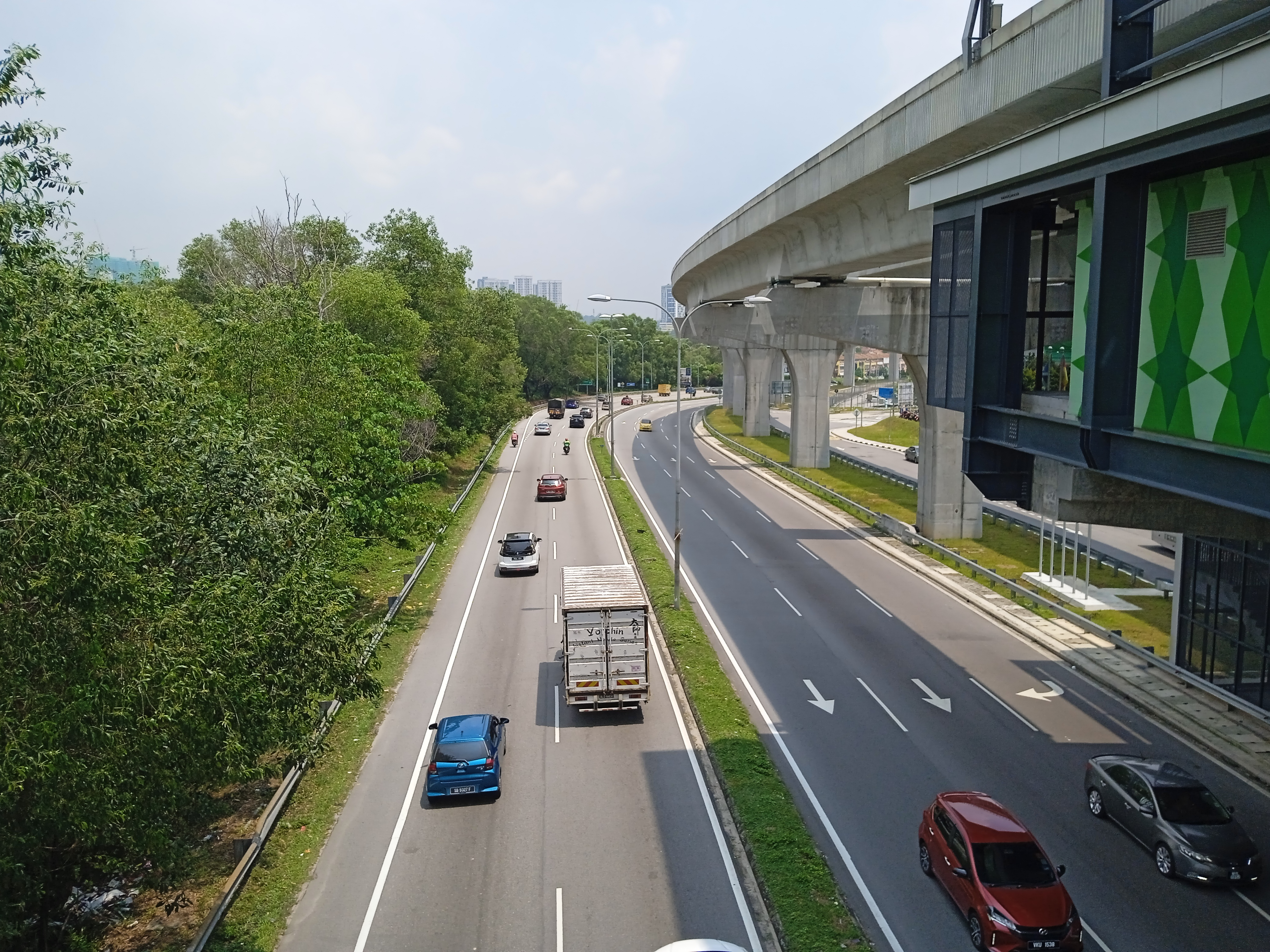

Route information
- Maintained by Malaysian Public Works Department
- Length: 9.4 km (5.8 mi)

Major junctions
- Southwest end: Serdang interchange Damansara–Puchong Expressway
- Damansara–Puchong Expressway; Maju Expressway; B13 Jalan Serdang; Sungai Besi Expressway
- Northeast end: Seri Kembangan interchange Sungai Besi Expressway

Location
- Country: Malaysia
- Primary destinations: Lestari Perdana, Putra Permai, Seri Kembangan, Universiti Putra Malaysia (UPM), Balakong

Highway system
- Highways in Malaysia; Expressways; Federal; State

Jalan Seri Kembangan, or Jalan Putra Permai and Jalan Besar, Federal Route 3215 (formerly Selangor State Route B16), is a major highway in Selangor, Malaysia. This 9.4 km (5.8 miles) toll-free highway connects Serdang interchange of the Damansara–Puchong Expressway in the southwest to Seri Kembangan interchange of the Sungai Besi Expressway in the northeast. Jalan Seri Kembangan connects with three major tolled expressways: Damansara–Puchong Expressway, Maju Expressway and Sungai Besi Expressway.

The Kilometre Zero is located at Serdang interchange of the Damansara–Puchong Expressway.

At most sections, the Federal Route 3215 was built under the JKR R5 road standard, with a speed limit of 90 km/h (56 mph).

== Junction lists ==
The entire route is located in Petaling District, Selangor.

Legend:

- I/C - Interchange, I/S - Intersection, RSA - Rest and service area, OBR - Overhead bridge restaurant, R/R - Restaurant and rest plaza, L/B - Layby, V/P - Vista point, TN - tunnel, T/P - Toll plaza, BR - Bridge
- C - Cloverleaf, S - Stack, T-A - Trumpet-A, T-B - Trumpet-B, DT - Directional-T/Y, SDT - Semi-Directional-T/Y, P-Y - Partial-Y, D - Diamond, P-C - Partial cloverleaf, D-D - Diverging diamond, D-R - Direct ramp

Location	km	mi	Name	Destinations	Notes
Serdang	0.0	0.0	Through to Persiaran Alpina		
Serdang	0.0	0.0	Serdang-LDP I/C	Damansara–Puchong Expressway – Puchong, USJ Subang Jaya, Hicom, Shah Alam, Petaling Jaya, Kuala Lumpur, Damansara, Kepong; FT 29 Putrajaya–Cyberjaya Expressway – Putrajaya, Cyberjaya, Kuala Lumpur International Airport (KLIA); South Klang Valley Expressway – Pulau Indah, Banting, Klang, Ipoh, Kajang, Seremban	Diamond interchange
Bandar Putra Permai			Bandar Putra Permai	Persiaran Kota Perdana – Kota Perdana, Lestari Putra, Lestari Puchong; Jalan Atmosphere Utama 2 – Taman Prima Tropika	LILO exit
Bandar Putra Permai			Bandar Putra Permai	Persiaran Lestari Perdana – Bandar Putra Permai, Lestari Putra, Lestari Perdana; Jalan Prima Tropika – Taman Prima Tropika	Junctions
Bandar Putra Permai			Bandar Putra Permai	Pasar Borong Selangor	
Bandar Putra Permai			Bandar Putra Permai	Persiaran Lestari Perdana 1 – Bandar Putra Permai, Lestari Putra, Lestari Perdana, AEON Taman Equine; Persiaran Pinggiran Putra – Taman Pinggiran Putra	Junctions
Bandar Putra Permai			Bandar Putra Permai	Persiaran Akademik Perdana – Taman Equine; Jalan Pinggiran Putra – Taman Pinggiran Putra, Alice Smith International School	Junctions
Seri Kembangan			NAHRIM	National Hydraulic Research Institute of Malaysia (NAHRIM)	
Seri Kembangan			MARDI research farm	MARDI research farm	
Seri Kembangan			Seri Kembangan-MEX I/C	Maju Expressway – Kuala Lumpur, Petaling Jaya, Bukit Jalil, Putrajaya, Cyberjaya, Kuala Lumpur International Airport (KLIA)	Trumpet interchange
Seri Kembangan			Taman Universiti Indah	Jalan Indah – Taman Universiti Indah	T-junctions
Seri Kembangan			Seri Kembangan Trade Centre	Jalan BS 3/1 – Seri Kembangan Trade Centre	T-junctions
Seri Kembangan			Taman Jinma		
Seri Kembangan			Seri Kembangan	B13 Jalan Raya 5 – Serdang, Universiti Putra Malaysia (UPM); Kajang Dispersal Link Expressway – Kajang, Putrajaya, Cyberjaya, Kuala Lumpur International Airport (KLIA); North–South Expressway Southern Route – Kuala Lumpur, Petaling Jaya, Seremban, Malacca, Johor Bahru	T-junctions
Seri Kembangan			Seri Kembangan	City Centre	
Seri Kembangan			Seri Kembangan	Jalan Raya 1 – Serdang, Universiti Putra Malaysia (UPM); Kajang Dispersal Link Expressway – Kajang, Putrajaya, Cyberjaya, Kuala Lumpur International Airport (KLIA); North–South Expressway Southern Route – Kuala Lumpur, Petaling Jaya, Seremban, Malacca, Johor Bahru	T-junctions
Seri Kembangan			Jalan Utama	Jalan Utama – Taman Serdang Raya	T-junctions
Seri Kembangan			South City Plaza		
Seri Kembangan			Taman Serdang Perdana	Persiaran Serdang Perdana – Taman Serdang Perdana	T-junctions
Seri Kembangan			Railway crossing bridge		
Seri Kembangan	9.4	5.8	Seri Kembangan-Besraya I/C	Sungai Besi Expressway – Kuantan, Ampang, Kuala Lumpur, Sungai Besi, Petaling Jaya, Cheras, Mines Resort City, Balakong, Kajang, Universiti Tenaga Nasional (Uniten), Putrajaya, Cyberjaya, Kuala Lumpur International Airport (KLIA)	Half diamond interchange
1.000 mi = 1.609 km; 1.000 km = 0.621 mi: Incomplete access; Route transition
