= Kajang Dispersal Link Expressway =

Road in Malaysia

Expressway 18
- Kajang Dispersal Link Expressway

Route information
- Maintained by Sistem Lingkaran-Lebuhraya Kajang Sdn Bhd (SILK)
- Length: 37 km (23 mi)
- Existed: 2002–present
- History: Completed in 2004
- Component highways: Main link (Mines–UPM Interchange); Sungai Balak Link (Sungai Balak–Sungai Ramal Interchange)

Major junctions
- Beltway around Kajang
- From: Mines Interchange on Sungai Besi Expressway
- Sungai Besi Expressway; FT 3211 Federal Route 3211; Cheras–Kajang Expressway; East Klang Valley Expressway; Kajang Bypass; Kajang–Seremban Highway; North–South Expressway Southern Route; FT 1 Federal Route 1 South Klang Valley Expressway
- To: UPM Interchange on Sungai Besi Expressway

Location
- Country: Malaysia
- Primary destinations: Balakong, Bandar Sungai Long, Kajang, Semenyih, Bandar Baru Bangi, Putrajaya

Highway system
- Highways in Malaysia; Expressways; Federal; State

E18 Kajang Dispersal Link Expressway, SILK, also known as Kajang SILK Highway (Malay: Lebuhraya Lingkaran Penyuraian Trafik Kajang), is an expressway built to disperse and regulate the traffic flow in Kajang, Selangor, Malaysia. The 37 km (23 mi) expressway is to allow motorists to bypass the town centre of Kajang. It is also useful as the main ring road of Kajang.

The Kilometre Zero is located at Mines Interchange near Seri Kembangan.

== History ==
Kajang Dispersal Link Expressway used to be called Jalan Kajang–Puchong (Jalan Sungai Chua on Kajang town side) 11 and Jalan Balakong 3211. The huge traffic jams that clogged traffic flow in Kajang town centre were the main reason behind the construction of the highway. Construction began in 2002. The expressway was completed in 2003 and began operation on 15 June 2004.

== Features ==
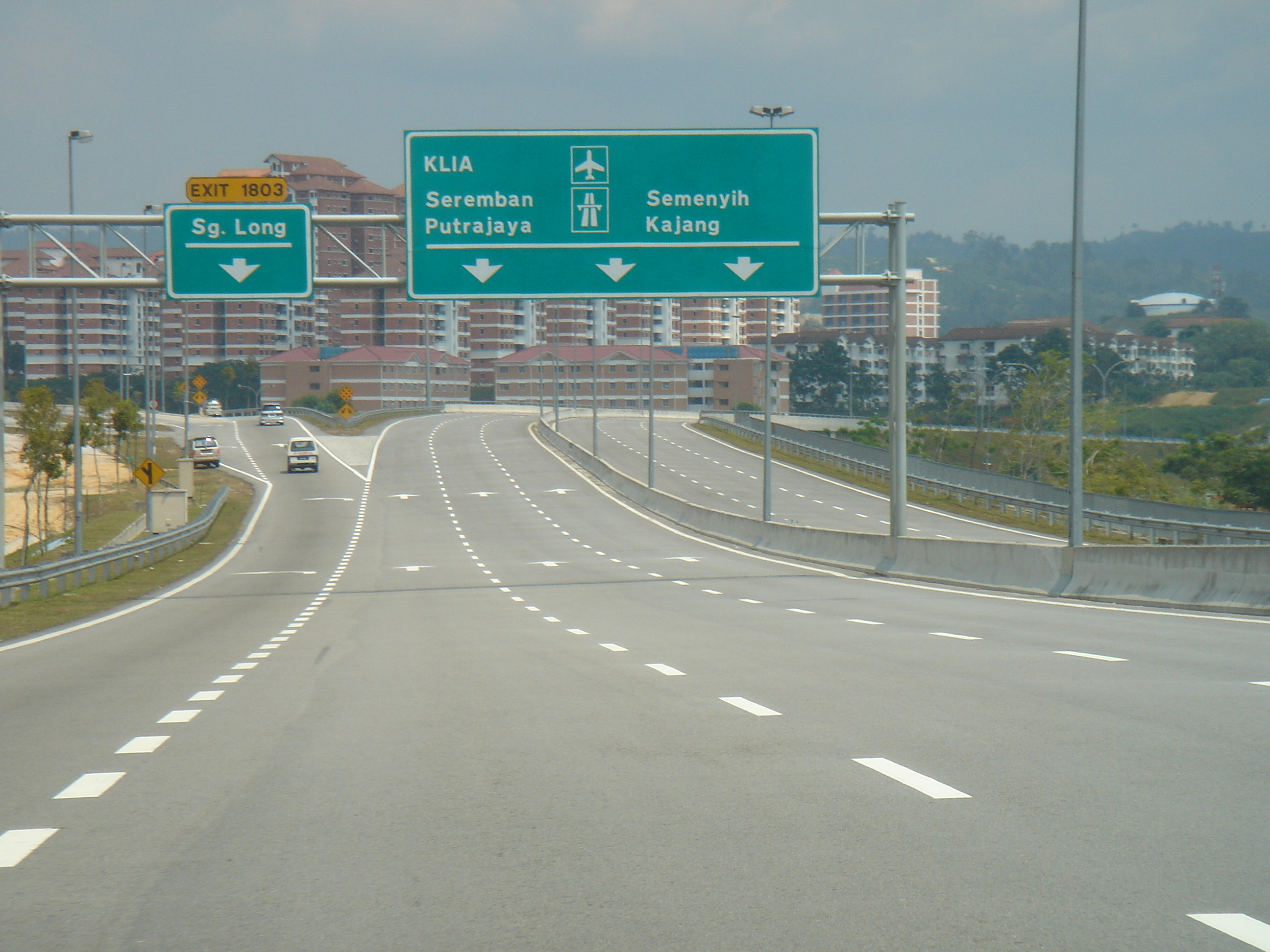
The Kajang Dispersal Link Expressway (SILK) near Bandar Sungai Long exit, Selangor

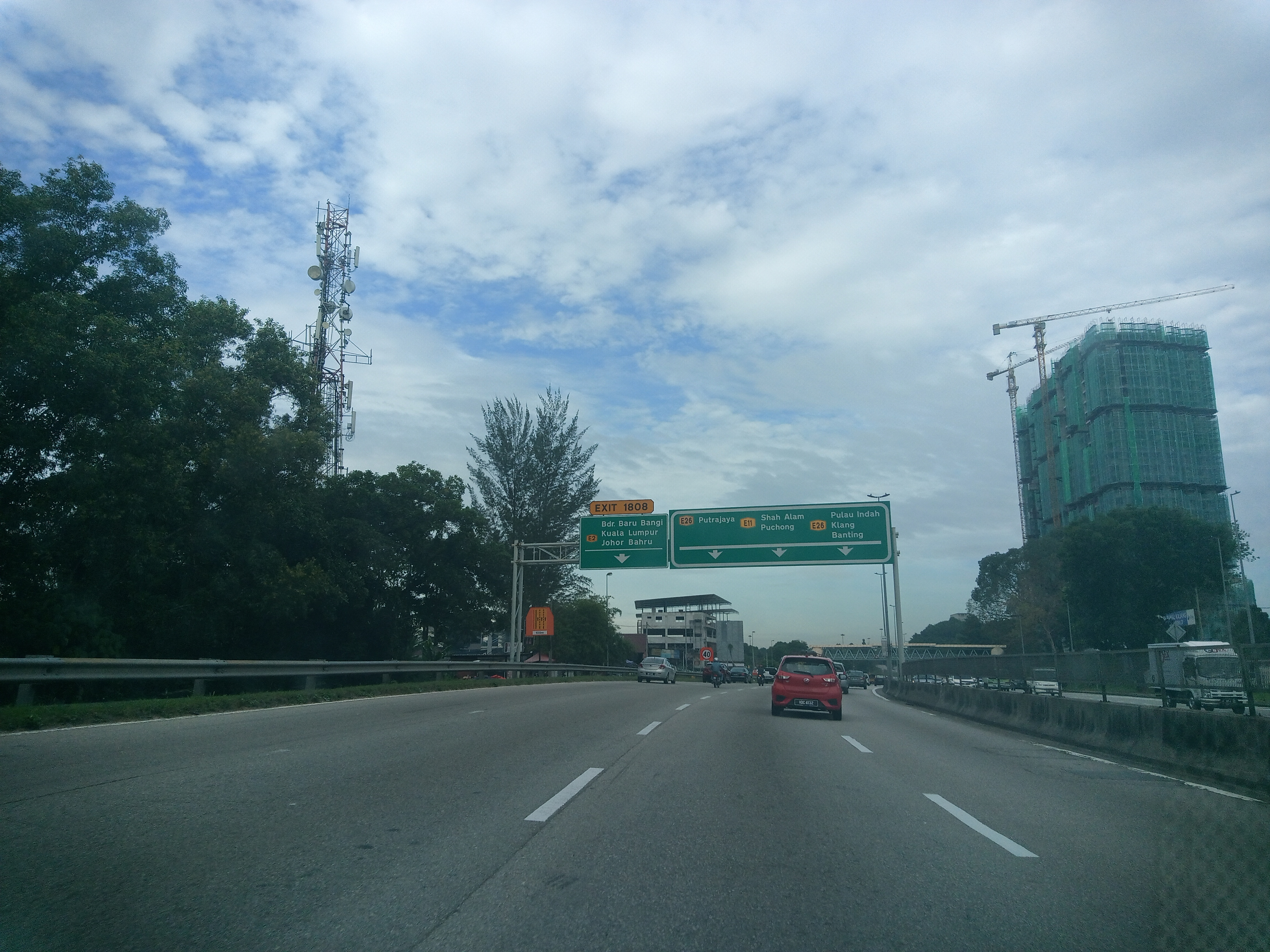
The Kajang Dispersal Link Expressway (SILK) heading to Exit 1808

Kajang Dispersal Link Expressway is fully lit at night and has 11 multi-level interchanges. The expressway has computerized traffic information display and monitoring system and 24-hour highway patrol. The expressway concessionaire offers emergency and vehicle breakdown assistance.

== Tolls ==
The Kajang Dispersal Link Expressway uses opened toll systems. In October 2022, it was one of the four expressways maintained by PROLINTAS to have its toll rates deducted between 8% and 15%.

In almost every plazas, one of the toll booth marked "Touch 'n Go" houses a Touch 'n Go card reload machine on both the directions (except Sungai Balak, which is only available in the Southbound direction), totalling 7 spots which users can reload their card without fee all the time.

=== Electronic Toll Collections (ETC) ===
As part of an initiative to facilitate faster transaction at the Sungai Long, Bukit Kajang, Sungai Ramal and Sungai Balak Toll Plazas, all toll transactions at four toll plazas on the Kajang Dispersal Link Expressway have been conducted electronically via Touch 'n Go cards, bank cards with NFC function (VISA & Mastercard), myRFID or SmartTAGs currently.

=== Self-Service TnG Card Reload Machine ===
In almost every toll plaza on both directions, one of the toll booth is marked "Tambah Nilai" ("Top Up") in blue color along with "Touch N' Go" logo. In those booths, a self-service Touch 'n Go card reload machine before the scanner location can be found, allowing users to reload their card anytime.

Availability of such facility as of May 2026 is as follow.

Toll Plaza	Reload Machine	Count
Sungai Balak (TSB)	Southbound only	1
Sungai Ramal (TSR)	Both directions	2
Sungai Long (TSL)	Both directions	2
Bukit Kajang	Both directions	2

=== Toll rates ===
(Starting 20 October 2022)

Class	Type of vehicles	Rate (in Malaysian Ringgit (RM))
0	Motorcycles, bicycles or vehicles with 2 or less wheels	Free
1	Vehicles with 2 axles and 3 or 4 wheels excluding taxis	RM1.66
2	Vehicles with 2 axles and 5 or 6 wheels excluding buses	RM3.60
3	Vehicles with 3 or more axles	RM5.40
4	Taxis	RM0.83
5	Buses	RM0.92

Abbreviation	Name
TSL	Sungai Long
TBK	Bukit Kajang
TSR	Sungai Ramal
TSB	Sungai Balak

== Accidents ==
=== 2025 Bukit Kajang Toll Plaza Accident ===
- On 27 September 2025, a one-year-old boy was killed and eight others were injured in a four-vehicle accident at the Bukit Kajang toll plaza.
- On 5 October 2025, a Malaysian Public Works Department Shah Alam District officer Mohd Hafizi bin Anuar died after 9 days of operation in Kajang Hospital, totalling up to two people killed in this accident.

== Interchanges list ==
The entire route is located in Selangor.

Legend:

- I/C - Interchange, I/S - Intersection, RSA - Rest and service area, OBR - Overhead bridge restaurant, R/R - Restaurant and rest plaza, L/B - Layby, V/P - Vista point, TN - tunnel, T/P - Toll plaza, BR - Bridge
- C - Cloverleaf, S - Stack, T-A - Trumpet-A, T-B - Trumpet-B, DT - Directional-T/Y, SDT - Semi-Directional-T/Y, P-Y - Partial-Y, D - Diamond, P-C - Partial cloverleaf, D-D - Diverging diamond, D-R - Direct ramp

=== Main Link ===
District	km	Exit	Name	Destinations	Notes
Petaling	0.0	902	Mines I/C	Sungai Besi Expressway – Seri Kembangan, Sungai Besi, Kuala Lumpur, Ampang, Seremban, Putrajaya, Cyberjaya, Kuala Lumpur International Airport (KLIA), University of Putra Malaysia (UPM), National Defence University of Malaysia (UPNM)	Directional-T interchange
Petaling			Mines flyover (towards Balakong only); Mines I/S	Jalan Dulang – Mines Resort City, The Mines, Malaysia International Exhibition and Convention Centre (MIECC)	T-junctions
Petaling			Taman Sungai Besi Indah		
Petaling			Taman Seri Timah		
Hulu Langat			Taman Bukit Belimbing	Jalan Belimbing – Taman Bukit Belimbing	Eastbound
Hulu Langat			Taming Jaya Industrial Park		Westbound
Hulu Langat			Taman Taming Jaya I/C	Taman Taming Jaya, Taman Sri Cheras, U-Turn	Diamond interchange
Hulu Langat			Kampung Baru Balakong		Eastbound
Hulu Langat			Taman Taming Kiri		Westbound
Hulu Langat			Taman Impian Ehsan	Taman Impian Ehsan, Taman Impian Indah	Westbound
Hulu Langat			Taman Cheras Jaya U-Turn	U-Turn	Diamond interchange
Hulu Langat			Taman Cheras Jaya	Jalan CJ 3 – Taman Cheras Jaya, Cheras Jaya Industrial Park	Westbound
Hulu Langat			Bandar Tun Hussein Onn	Jalan Suakasih – Bandar Tun Hussein Onn	Eastbound
Hulu Langat			Taman Sri Indah		Westbound
Hulu Langat			Taman Cheras Perdana		Eastbound
Hulu Langat		1801	Balakong I/C	FT 3211 Jalan Balakong – Balakong; Cheras–Kajang Expressway / FT 1 – Kuala Lumpur, Cheras, Kajang, Ampang	Interchange
Hulu Langat		BR	Sungai Langat bridge		
Hulu Langat	7.9	1803	Sungai Long I/C	Jalan Sungai Long – Balakong, Kuala Lumpur, Cheras, Kajang, Bandar Sungai Long, Bandar Mahkota Cheras, Universiti Tunku Abdul Rahman Sungai Long Campus	Interchange
Hulu Langat		T/P	Sungai Long Toll Plaza	Touch 'n Go SmartTAG MyRFID	
Hulu Langat		1803A	Sungai Long South I/C	East Klang Valley Expressway – Gombak, Ukay Perdana, Ulu Klang, Ampang, Hulu Langat	Trumpet interchange
Hulu Langat	16.6	1804	Kajang Perdana I/C	Kajang Bypass – Kuala Lumpur, Cheras; Kajang–Seremban Highway – Semenyih, Mantin, Seremban	Cloverleaf interchange
Hulu Langat		1805	Kajang Prima I/C	FT 1 Malaysia Federal Route 1 – Kajang town centre, Semenyih, Seremban	Half-diamond interchange
Hulu Langat		T/P	Bukit Kajang Toll Plaza	Touch 'n Go SmartTAG MyRFID	
Hulu Langat		RSA	Bukit Kajang RSA	Bukit Kajang RSA –	Eastbound
Hulu Langat			Taman Bukit Mewah	Jalan Bukit Mewah 9/1 – Taman Bukit Mewah, Science and Technology Research Institute for Defence (STRIDE)	Westbound
Hulu Langat			Taman Bukit Mewah	Jalan Bukit Mewah 41 – Taman Bukit Mewah	Eastbound
Hulu Langat		1805A	Kajang Utama I/C	Jalan Maju – Taman Kajang Utama	Half diamond interchange
Hulu Langat			MIROS	Malaysian Institute of Road Safety Research (MIROS)	Eastbound
Hulu Langat		BR	Railway crossing bridge		
Hulu Langat		1806	Jalan Reko I/C	B17 Jalan Reko – Kajang, Bangi, Bandar Baru Bangi, Universiti Kebangsaan Malaysia (UKM)	Parcelo interchange
Hulu Langat			Jalan Wan Siew I/C	Jalan Wan Siew	Parcelo interchange
Hulu Langat		T/P	Sungai Ramal (East) Toll Plaza	Touch 'n Go SmartTAG MyRFID	
Hulu Langat			Taman Putra Kajang	Jalan Taman Putra Kajang – Taman Putra Kajang	Westbound
Hulu Langat		T/P	Sungai Ramal (West) Toll Plaza	Touch 'n Go SmartTAG MyRFID	
Hulu Langat		L/B	Sungai Ramal L/B	Sungai Ramal L/B – Persiaran Sungai Chua – Pusat Perindustrian Sungai Chua	Eastbound
Hulu Langat		BR	Sungai Ramal bridge		
Hulu Langat	24.4	1807	Sungai Ramal I/C	Kajang Dispersal Link Expressway (Sungai Ramal–Sungai Balak Link) – Cheras, Kuala Lumpur, Kajang town centre	Directional-T interchange
Hulu Langat		L/B	Shell L/B	Shell	Westbound
Hulu Langat			Kampung Sungai Ramal Dalam	Kampung Sungai Ramal Dalam	Westbound
Hulu Langat		1808	Country Heights I/C	North–South Expressway Southern Route – Kuala Lumpur, Seremban, Malacca, Johor Bahru; Persiaran Jaya – Country Heights, Bandar Baru Bangi	Multi level stacked diamond interchange
Hulu Langat		L/B	Petronas L/B	Petronas	Westbound
Sepang			Malaysian Highway Authority	Malaysian Highway Authority Main Headquarters and Central Regional Office	Westbound
Sepang		1809	Uniten I/C	South Klang Valley Expressway – Putrajaya, Cyberjaya, Kuala Lumpur International Airport (KLIA), Puchong, Shah Alam, Bandar Saujana Putra, Banting, Telok Panglima Garang, Klang, Pulau Indah; B13 Jalan Uniten–Dengkil – Bangi,Universiti Tenaga Nasional (Uniten), Dengkil	Cloverleaf interchange
Sepang			Lebuh Silikon I/C	Lebuh Silikon – University of Putra Malaysia (UPM)	Diamond interchange
Sepang		1810 901	UPM I/C	B13 Jalan Serdang – University of Putra Malaysia (UPM), Seri Kembangan, Serdang; North–South Expressway Southern Route – Kuala Lumpur, Seremban, Malacca, Johor Bahru	Diamond interchange
Petaling	–	–	–		
Through to Sungai Besi Expressway

=== Sungai Ramal–Sungai Balak Link ===
The entire route is located in Hulu Langat District, Selangor.

km	Exit	Name	Destinations	Notes
	1807	Sungai Ramal I/C	Kajang Dispersal Link Expressway (Main Link) – Seremban, Putrajaya, Cyberjaya, Kuala Lumpur International Airport (KLIA), Bangi, Universiti Kebangsaan Malaysia (UKM), Semenyih	Directional-T interchange
		Kampung Sungai Ramal Luar	Kampung Sungai Ramal Luar, Masjid Sungai Ramal	Northbound
		Kampung Sungai Ramal Luar I/C	Kampung Sungai Ramal Luar, Sekolah Kebangsaan Leftenan Adnan (SKLA)	Diamond interchange
	BR	Sungai Ramal bridge		
	1812	Sungai Chua I/C	Jalan Bukit Angkat – Sungai Chua, Bukit Angkat; B11 Jalan Sungai Chua – Kajang town centre	Diamond interchange
	BR	Railway crossing bridge		
	T/P	Sungai Balak Toll Plaza	Touch 'n Go SmartTAG MyRFID	
		Simpang Balak I/C	Jalan Simpang Balak	Half diamond interchange
	BR	Sungai Balak bridge		
	BR	Sungai Langat bridge		
29.9A	707A	Sungai Balak I/C	Cheras–Kajang Expressway / FT 1 – Kuala Lumpur, Cheras, Kajang, Semenyih	Trumpet interchange
