= Selangor State Route B13 =

Road in Malaysia

Selangor Route 13

Major junctions
- North end: Uniten
- Kajang Dispersal Link Expressway; South Klang Valley Expressway; B11 State Route B11; FT 31 Federal Route 31
- South end: Bandar Baru Bangi

Location
- Country: Malaysia
- Primary destinations: Dengkil, Sungai Merab, Putrajaya

Highway system
- Highways in Malaysia; Expressways; Federal; State

Selangor State Route B13, Jalan Uniten–Dengkil or Jalan Ayer Hitam is a major highway in Selangor, Malaysia.

== Junction lists ==
The entire route is located in Selangor.

Legend:

- I/C - Interchange, I/S - Intersection, RSA - Rest and service area, OBR - Overhead bridge restaurant, R/R - Restaurant and rest plaza, L/B - Layby, V/P - Vista point, TN - tunnel, T/P - Toll plaza, BR - Bridge
- C - Cloverleaf, S - Stack, T-A - Trumpet-A, T-B - Trumpet-B, DT - Directional-T/Y, SDT - Semi-Directional-T/Y, P-Y - Partial-Y, D - Diamond, P-C - Partial cloverleaf, D-D - Diverging diamond, D-R - Direct ramp

District	Location	km	mi	Exit	Name	Destinations	Notes
Sepang	UPM				Seri Kembangan–UPM-Silk I/C	see also Jalan Serdang	
Sepang	UPM				UPM-Silk I/C–Uniten-Silk I/C	see also Kajang Dispersal Link Expressway	
Sepang	Uniten	0.0	0.0	2600; 1809	Uniten-SKVE-Silk I/C	South Klang Valley Expressway – Putrajaya, Cyberjaya, Kuala Lumpur International Airport (KLIA), Puchong, Shah Alam, Petaling Jaya; Kajang Dispersal Link Expressway – Universiti Putra Malaysia (UPM), Serdang, Seri Kembangan, Mines Resort City, Sungai Besi, Kuala Lumpur, Kajang, Semenyih, Sungai Long, Seremban, Malacca, Johor Bahru	Cloverleaf interchange
Sepang	Uniten				Uniten Roundabout	B11 Jalan Kajang–Puchong – Uniten Hostel, Malaysian Highway Authority Main Headquarters	Roundabout interchange
Sepang	Bangi Government and Private Training Centre Area				Uniten	Universiti Tenaga Nasional (Uniten)	T-junctions
Sepang	Bangi Government and Private Training Centre Area				CIMB Training Centre	CIMB Training Centre	T-junctions
Sepang	Bangi Government and Private Training Centre Area				Public Bank Training and IT Centre	Public Bank Training and IT Centre	T-junctions
Sepang	Bangi Government and Private Training Centre Area				Maybank Training Centre	Maybank Training Centre	T-junctions
Sepang	Bangi Government and Private Training Centre Area			Kampung Dato' Abu Bakar Baginda food court			
Sepang	Bangi Government and Private Training Centre Area				Bangi Government and Private Training Centre Area	Jalan Institusi – Malaysian Palm Oil Board Training Centre, Bank Simpanan Nasional (BSN) Training Centre	T-junctions
Sepang	Sungai Merab				Kampung Dato' Abu Bakar Baginda		
Sepang	Sungai Merab				Putrajaya	Jalan P 14/1 – Putrajaya	T-junctions
Sepang	Sungai Merab				U-Turn bridge	U-Turn	
Sepang	Sungai Merab				U-Turn	U-Turn	
Sepang	Sungai Merab	5.3	3.3		Kampung Tasik Baru	B13 Jalan Sungai Merab – Dengkil	Half-diamond interchange
Sepang	Sungai Merab				Kampung Sungai Merab		
Sepang	Sungai Merab				Sungai Merab	Jalan Maktab – Institut Latihan Islam Malaysia (ILIM), Institut Perguruan Islam Selangor (IPIS); Jalan Aman – Taman Damai	Junctions
Sepang	Sungai Merab				Pusat Latihan Perindustrian dan Pemulihan		
Hulu Langat	Bandar Baru Bangi				Bandar Baru Bangi	B88 Persiaran Pusat Bandar 1 – Bandar Baru Bangi town centre, Kajang, Bangi; North–South Expressway Southern Route – Kuala Lumpur, Seremban, Malacca, Johor Bahru	T-junctions
1.000 mi = 1.609 km; 1.000 km = 0.621 mi: Concurrency terminus
