= Taman Equine MRT station =

Metro station in Selangor, Malaysia

PY36 Taman Equine

General information
- Other names: Malay: تامن ايكوين (Jawi); Chinese: 怡观园; Tamil: தாமான் இக்குயின்
- Location: Jalan Seri Kembangan, Taman Pinggiran Putra, 43400 Seri Kembangan; Selangor; Malaysia
- System: Rapid KL
- Owner: MRT Corp
- Operator: Rapid Rail
- Line: 12 Putrajaya Line
- Platforms: 1 island platform
- Tracks: 2

Construction
- Parking: Available
- Accessible: Yes

Other information
- Status: Operational
- Station code: PY36

History
- Opened: 16 March 2023; 3 years ago

Services
Preceding station		Following station
UPM towards Kwasa Damansara	Putrajaya Line	Putra Permai towards Putrajaya Sentral
Location

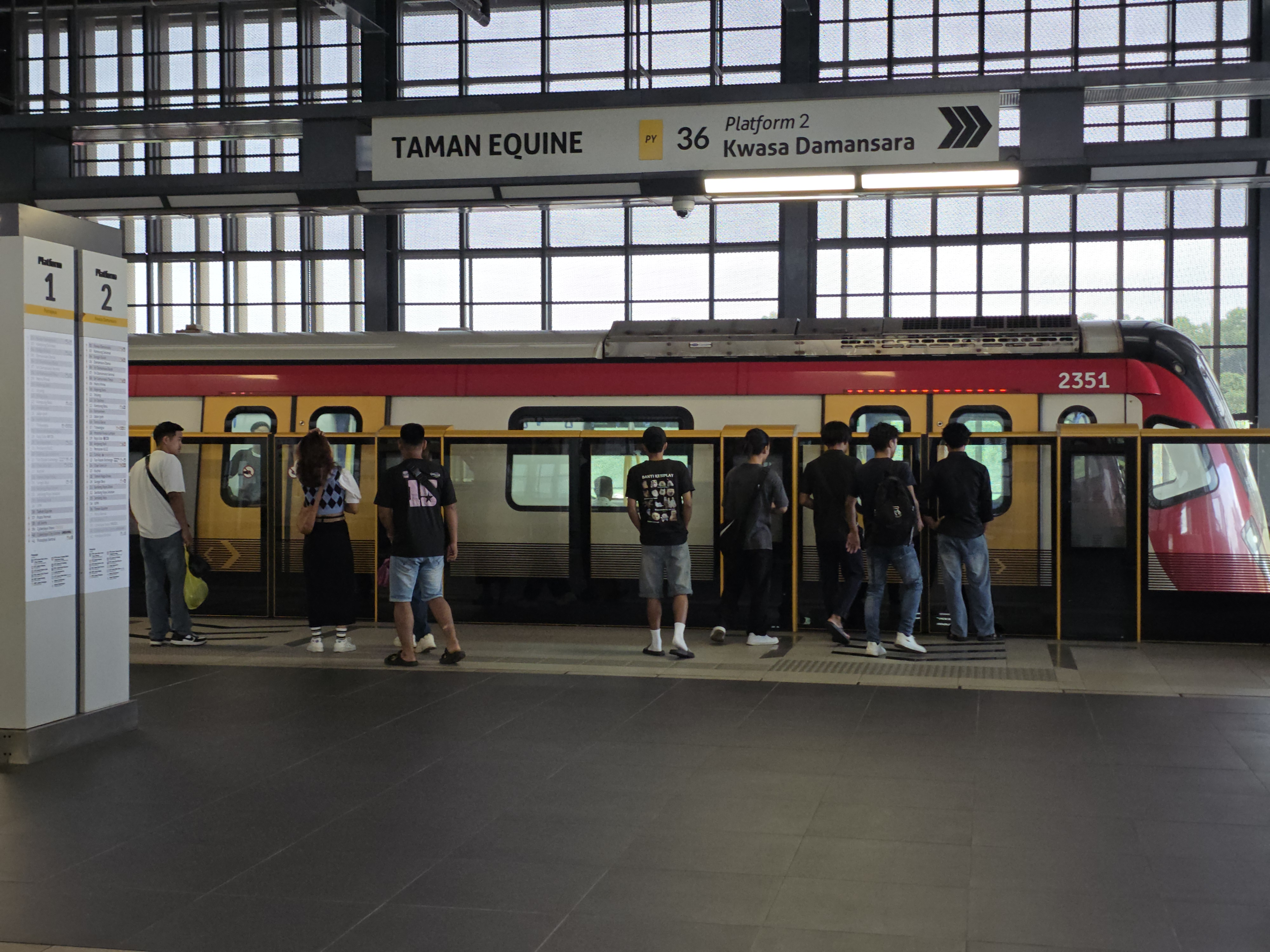
Station's platform level

The Taman Equine MRT station is a mass rapid transit (MRT) station serving the suburbs of Taman Equine and Taman Pinggiran Putra in Seri Kembangan, Selangor, Malaysia. It is one of the stations built as part of the Klang Valley Mass Rapid Transit (KVMRT) project on the MRT Putrajaya Line.

== Location ==
The station is located on Jalan Seri Kembangan near Pasar Borong Selangor and AEON Mall Equine Park, both accessible within walking distance from the station.

== Bus Services ==
=== Feeder buses ===
Route No.	Origin	Destination	Via	Connecting to	Images
T543	PY36 Taman Equine (Entrance B)	Taman Lestari Perdana; Puncak Jalil	Persiaran Lestari Perdana; Persiaran Puncak Jalil 2 Persiaran Puncak Jalil; Jalan Puncak Jalil 7 Jalan Puncak Jalil 8	540, 541, SJ05	MRT Feeder Bus T543

=== Other buses ===
Route No.	Operator	Origin	Destination	Via	Connecting to	Notes
541	Rapid KL	PY36 Taman Equine (Entrance B)	SP22 Kinrara BK 5		SJ03, T543, T581	
SJ05	Smart Selangor	Putra Permai, Equine Park	The Park, Bukit Serdang	Jalan Putra Permai; AEON Mall Equine Park; Jalan Indah; Jalan BS 3/1; Jalan Aman; Jalan SK 13/2; Jalan 14/3; Jalan Kasturi; Jalan Cemara; Jalan Pasar; PY33 Serdang Jaya (Entrance A) (Putra Permai-bound only); Jalan Raya 2 PKNS Apartments; Jalan Raya 4 Jalan SK 6/1	541, T561	700 meter Walking distance required via AEON Mall Equine Park.

=== Discontinued Lines ===
T542 was part of the 19 bus routes in the Klang Valley that were discontinued and replaced by Rapid KL on Demand routes on January 16, 2026. Low ridership was cited as the reason for their termination.

Route No.	Origin	Desitination	Via	Connected to	Terminated
540	KB05 Serdang	Putra Permai, Equine Park	Jalan Seri Kembangan; PY33 Serdang Jaya (Entrance A) (Putra Permai-bound only); Jalan SK 12/1; Jalan Putra Permai; Jalan Indah; Jalan Pinggiran Putra; PY36 Taman Equine; AEON Mall Equine Park; Persiaran Equine Perdana	541, SJ05, T565, T571	14 February 2026
T542	PY36 Taman Equine (Entrance A)	Taman Pinggiran Putra	Jalan Putra Permai; Jalan Prima Tropika; Persiaran Permai Sentosa; Persiaran Pinggiran Putra 2 Selangor Wholesale Market; AEON Mall Equine Park	540, SJ05	16 January 2026
