= Jalan Serdang =

Road in Malaysia

Selangor Route 13
- Jalan Serdang

Major junctions
- Northwest end: Seri Kembangan
- FT 3215 Jalan Seri Kembangan; Sungai Besi Expressway; Kajang Dispersal Link Expressway; North–South Expressway Southern Route / AH2
- Southeast end: UPM Interchange

Location
- Country: Malaysia
- Primary destinations: Serdang

Highway system
- Highways in Malaysia; Expressways; Federal; State

Jalan Serdang, consisting of Jalan Raya 5 and Jalan UPM (Selangor State Route B13) is a dual-carriageway state roads in Klang Valley region, Selangor, Malaysia.

== Junction lists ==
The entire route is located in Selangor.

Legend:

- I/C - Interchange, I/S - Intersection, RSA - Rest and service area, OBR - Overhead bridge restaurant, R/R - Restaurant and rest plaza, L/B - Layby, V/P - Vista point, TN - tunnel, T/P - Toll plaza, BR - Bridge
- C - Cloverleaf, S - Stack, T-A - Trumpet-A, T-B - Trumpet-B, DT - Directional-T/Y, SDT - Semi-Directional-T/Y, P-Y - Partial-Y, D - Diamond, P-C - Partial cloverleaf, D-D - Diverging diamond, D-R - Direct ramp

District	Location	km	mi	Exit	Name	Destinations	Notes
Petaling	Seri Kembangan				Seri Kembangan	FT 3215 Jalan Seri Kembangan – Puchong, Putrajaya, Cyberjaya, Petaling Jaya, Sungai Besi, Mines Resort City, Balakong, Kajang	T-junctions
Petaling	Seri Kembangan				Serdang Jaya	Jalan Raya 5	T-junctions
Petaling	Seri Kembangan				Seri Kembangan roundabout	Jalan Raya 1 – Seri Kembangan, Seri Kembangan Industrial Area	Roundabout
Petaling	Seri Kembangan				Sri Serdang	Jalan Sri Serdang Utara – Sri Serdang	T-junctions
Sepang	UPM				University of Putra Malaysia (UPM)	University of Putra Malaysia (UPM)	T-junctions
Sepang	UPM				UPM I/C	Sungai Besi Expressway – Kuala Lumpur, Sungai Besi, Mines Resort City, Balakong; Kajang Dispersal Link Expressway – Putrajaya, Cyberjaya, Dengkil, Universiti Tenaga Nasional (Uniten), Kajang, Kuala Lumpur International Airport (KLIA)	Diamond interchange
Sepang	UPM			UPM Toll Plaza			
Sepang	UPM			209	UPM-NSE I/C	North–South Expressway Southern Route / AH2 – Kuala Lumpur, Seremban, Malacca, Johor Bahru	Trumpet interchange
1.000 mi = 1.609 km; 1.000 km = 0.621 mi: Electronic toll collection
