= Malaysian Highway Authority =

Government agency in Malaysia

- Lembaga Lebuhraya Malaysia (LLM) 马来西亚大道局 لمباݢ لبوهراي مليسيا
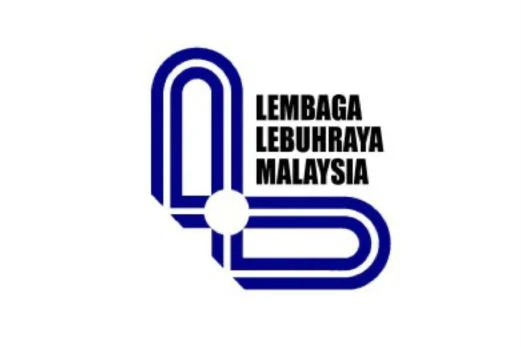

Agency overview
- Formed: 24 October 1980; 45 years ago
- Headquarters: Lembaga Lebuhraya Malaysia, B13 Jalan Serdang-Kajang KM6, Bangi, Selangor, Malaysia
- Minister responsible: Alexander Nanta Linggi, Minister of Works
- Deputy Minister responsible: Ahmad Maslan, Deputy Minister of Works
- Agency executives: Jalaluddin Alias, Chairman; Sazali Harun, Director General
- Parent department: Ministry of Works Malaysia
- Key document: Highway Authority Malaysia (Incorporation) Act 1980
- Website: www.llm.gov.my

The Malaysian Highway Authority (Malay: Lembaga Lebuhraya Malaysia; Chinese: 马来西亚大道局; Jawi: لمباݢ لبوهراي مليسيا; Abbreviation: LLM) is a statutory body under the Malaysian Ministry of Works (MOW). The agency was founded on 24 October 1980 by the Highway Authority of Malaysia (Incorporation) Act 1980 to monitor the works and administration of expressways. The establishment of the agency coincided with the construction of the North-South Expressway.

The agency operates the National Traffic Management Centre which links various toll concessionaires and provide traffic advisory and information to road users.

== Product ==
LLM Lettering is the typeface developed by Malaysian Highway Authority and used for road signage on expressways in Malaysia.

== Offices ==
Region	Location
Northern	Gelugor, Penang
Headquarters and Central	Bangi, Selangor
East Coast	Kuantan, Pahang and Ajil, Terengganu
Southern	Senai, Johor
