= Ab Hakim Borhan =

8th Mayor of Kuala Lumpur

Yang Berbahagia Datuk Seri Abdul Hakim Borhan SMW DSIS SSA AMN AMS PPT

8th Mayor of Kuala Lumpur
- In office 14 December 2006 – 13 December 2008
- Preceded by: Ruslin Hasan
- Succeeded by: Ahmad Fuad Ismail

Personal details
- Born: 1951 (age 74–75)

Abdul Hakim bin Borhan (born 1951) is a former Mayor of Kuala Lumpur.

== Honours ==
- Malaysia :
  - Member of the Order of the Defender of the Realm (AMN) (1999)
- Federal Territory (Malaysia) :
  - Grand Commander of the Order of the Territorial Crown (SMW) – Datuk Seri (2009)
- Selangor :
  - Knight Companion of the Order of Sultan Sharafuddin Idris Shah (DSIS) – Dato' (2003)
  - Companion of the Order of Sultan Salahuddin Abdul Aziz Shah (SSA) (1999)
  - Member of the Order of the Crown of Selangor (AMS) (1996)
  - Recipient of the Distinguished Conduct Medal (PPT) (1987)
