= Subang Jaya City Council =

City council of Subaya Jaya and south Petilang district

Subang Jaya City Council Majlis Bandaraya Subang Jaya
- Local Government Act 1976
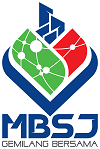
- Logo

Type
- Type: City council of Subang Jaya

Leadership
- Mayor: Amirul Azizan
- Deputy Mayor: Mohd Zulkurnain Che Ali

Structure
- Political groups: Councillors: DAP (13); PKR (6); Amanah (4); Vacant (1)

Motto
- Perbandaran Bestari, Kota Niaga Kediaman Idaman

Meeting place
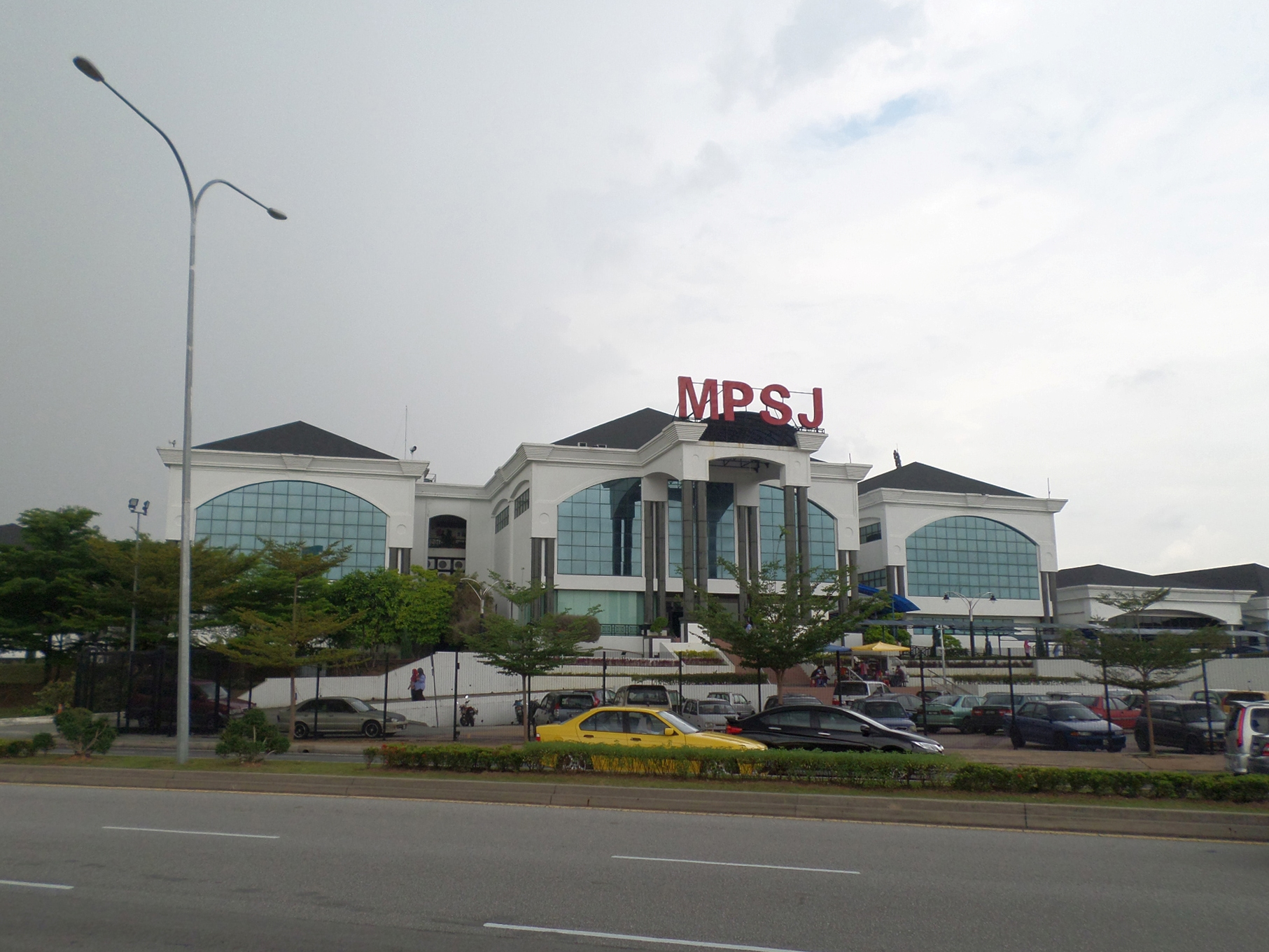
- MBSJ Headquarters, Persiaran Perpaduan, USJ 5, UEP Subang Jaya

Website
- portal.mbsj.gov.my

Footnotes
- Previously known as the Subang Jaya Municipal Council (until 20 October 2020)

Subang Jaya City Council (MBSJ; Malay: Majlis Bandaraya Subang Jaya) is the city council which is in charge of the Subang Jaya city and the southern parts of Petaling district. This agency is under Selangor state government of Malaysia. MBSJ are responsible for the public's health and sanitation, waste removal and management, town planning, environmental protection and building control, social and economic development and general maintenance functions of urban infrastructure. The MBSJ headquarters is located in UEP Subang Jaya.

== History ==
In the 1970s the Selangor state government established the Petaling District Council (Majlis Daerah Petaling, MDP) under section 4 of the Local Government Act 1976. In 1994, the state government decided to upgrade the authority to the status of a municipal council (majlis perbandaran), and rename it the Subang Jaya Municipal Council. The Subang Jaya Municipal Council was formed on 1 January 1997, by combining the existing Petaling District Council with several areas ceded from the Petaling Jaya Municipal Council (MPPJ) and Shah Alam Municipal Council (MPSA).

In December 2019, the Subang Jaya Municipal Council was granted the approval from the federal government to elevate its status from a City Council to become Subang Jaya City Council (MBSJ), which was gazetted on 20 October 2020.

== Organisation chart ==
=== Presidents and Mayors ===
No	President & Mayor	Term start	Term end
1	Tan Sri Datuk Seri Ahmad Fuad bin Ismail	1997	2003
2	Datuk Seri Abdul Hakim bin Borhan	2003	2005
3	Dato' Mohd Arif bin Ab. Rahman	2005	2007
4	Datuk Seri Adnan bin Md. Ikhsan	2007	2012
5	Dato' Asmawi bin Kasbi	2012	2014
6	Datuk Seri Nor Hisham bin Ahmad Dahlan	2015	2017
7	Noraini Roslan	2018	30 December 2021
8	Johary Anuar	8 February 2022	1 May 2023
9	Mohammad Fauzi Mohammad Yatim	2 May 2023	30 May 2024

== Current councillors ==
=== 2022/2023 Session ===
Zone No.	Member	Coalition (Party)
DAP 13 | PKR 7 | AMANAH 4 |
1	Chia Yew Ken	DAP
2	Tah Yap Keong	PKR
3	Lee Jen Uyin	DAP
4	Kamarul Hisham Hj. Yeop Hashim	AMANAH
5	Tanujah a/p Debulsingh	PKR
6	Khairol Basri M. Arif	AMANAH
7	Mohd Tarmizi Lazim	DAP
8	Kamarul Hafiz Kamarudin	DAP
9	Thomas Low Yew Sin	PKR
10	Ng Seow Chen	DAP
11	Pravin a/l Murali	PKR
12	Wan Shukri Wan Mustapha	AMANAH
13	Sarawati Mukhtar	PKR
14	Ahmad Danish Hairudin	PKR
15	Muhammad Fauzan Rosli	AMANAH
16	Yap Kok Weng	DAP
17	Parithi Vaanan a/l Ramasamy	DAP
18	Mehanathan Embamurthi	DAP
19	M. Anbarasan Murugesu	PKR
20	Mohan Singh Surtar Singh	DAP
21	Raymond Thong Kim Fatt	DAP
22	Teh Eng Teck	DAP
23	Wong Yii Seang	DAP
24	Thamilarusu Sandayan	DAP

== Departments ==
1. Top Management
2. Service Management Department
3. Corporate Planning & Strategic Management Department
4. Treasury Department
5. Revenue Department
6. Town Planning Department
7. Valuation & Property Management Department
8. Legal Department
9. License Department
10. Landscape Department
11. Enforcement Department
12. Building Department
13. Engineering Department
14. Health Department
15. Community Development Department
16. Environment Management Department
17. Information Technology Department
18. Commissioner Of Building Department
19. One Stop Centre Department
20. Internal Audit Department
21. Quantity Surveying And Contract Department
22. Integrity Unit

== Administrative area ==
In parliamentary terms, MBSJ administrative area covers the parliamentary constituency of Puchong and Subang in its entirety, as well as parts of Kota Raja which mainly cover USJ 23–27, Putra Heights and Kampung Bukit Lanchong. Subang Jaya city itself, most part of USJ (USJ 1-22), Kinrara, and northern part of Puchong lies within the Subang constituency, while Seri Kembangan, and southern part of Puchong falls within the Puchong constituency.

The gazetted decision defined the authority's area of 16,180 hectares and divided it into seven Planning Blocks in accordance with the Subang Jaya Municipal Council Local Plan 2035 (RTMPSJ 2035):

1. Planning Block 1 - Subang Jaya (SS 12 - SS 19), Bandar Sunway (PJS 7/PJS 9/PJS 11) & UEP Subang Jaya (USJ 1 - USJ 22);
2. Planning Block 2 - USJ 3A, Tropicana Metropark, Subang Hi-Tech & Batu Tiga;
3. Planning Block 3 - UEP Subang Jaya (USJ 23 - USJ 28), Putra Heights, Kampung Batu 13 1/2, Kampung Tengah, Kampung Bukit Lanchong;
4. Planning Block 4 - Kinrara, Bandar Puchong Jaya;
5. Planning Block 5 - Pusat Bandar Puchong, Bandar Puteri, Puchong Perdana, Puchong Utama, Batu 14, Puchong Hartamas, Kampung Baru Puchong, Bandar Bukit Puchong;
6. Planning Block 6 - Putra Permai, Equine Park, Saujana Puchong, Puncak Jalil, Lestari Perdana, Lestari Putra, Pinggiran Putra, Universiti Putra Malaysia (UPM) and
7. Planning Block 7 - Seri Kembangan New Village, Bukit Serdang, Universiti Indah, Serdang Jaya, Sri Serdang, Serdang Raya, Serdang Perdana, Serdang Lama, The Mines, Sungai Besi Indah, Belimbing Indah

Apart from this, the administration area for MBSJ was further breakdown into 24 zones.

ZONE 1

- SS 12
- SS 13
- SS 14
- SS 15
- SS 16
- SS 17
- SS 18
- SS 19
- Taman Wangsa Baiduri

ZONE 2

- PJS 7
- PJS 9
- PJS 11
- Bandar Sunway

ZONE 3

- USJ 7
- USJ 8
- USJ 9
- USJ 10 (USJ Taipan)
- USJ 11
- USJ 12
- USJ 13
- USJ 14
- USJ 15 (Sekolah Wawasan)
- USJ 16
- USJ 17
- USJ 18
- USJ 19
- USJ 20
- USJ 21
- USJ 22
- Taman Tanamera

ZONE 4

- USJ 1
- USJ 2
- USJ 3
- USJ 4
- USJ 5
- USJ 6
- Taman Perindustrian USJ 1
- Perumahan TP 1 & 2

ZONE 5

- Taman Batu Tiga
- Taman Mutiara Subang
- Taman Perindustrian Subang Hi-Tech
- Taman Perindustrian UEP (TP 7)
- Taman Pinggiran USJ
- Taman Subang Heights
- Taman Subang Mas
- Taman USJ Heights
- Tropicana Metropark

ZONE 6

- USJ 23
- USJ 24
- USJ 25 (One City)
- USJ 26
- USJ 27

ZONE 7

- Taman Putra Heights
- Kampung Bukit Lanchong

ZONE 8

- Kampung Kenangan
- Kampung Batu 13 ½
- Kampung Tengah A
- Kampung Tengah B
- Kampung Kuala Sungai Baru

ZONE 9

- Bandar Metro Puchong
- Lake Side
- Taman Perindustrian Puchong Seksyen 1, 5 & 6
- Taman Sri Puchong
- Taman Denai Puchong

ZONE 10

- Bukit Tandang
- Bandar Puchong Jaya
- Kampung Lembah Kinrara
- Pusat Perdagangan One Puchong
- Taman Bukit Kinrara
- Taman Puncak Kinrara
- Taman Perindustrian Kinrara Seksyen 1 & 2

ZONE 11

- Taman Kinrara Seksyen 1 – 5 & 7
- Taman Paik Siong
- Taman Bukit Kuchai
- Aman Sari
- Taman Tenaga
- Taman Kandan Baru
- Taman Kandan Lama
- Kompleks Suria Kinrara
- Pusat Perniagaan Kinrara

ZONE 12

- Kampung Sri Puchong Batu 13
- Kampung Bersatu
- Kampung Sri Langkas
- Kampung Sri Langkas Tambahan
- Kampung Sri Andalas
- Kampung Sri Aman Luar
- Kampung Sri Aman Tengah
- Kampung Sri Aman Dalam
- Kampung Sri Aman Hilir
- Puchong Horizon

ZONE 13

- Taman Puchong Intan
- Taman Puchong Indah
- Taman Puchong Perdana

ZONE 14

- Taman Puchong Permai
- Taman Desa Millenia
- Taman Puchong Prima
- Taman Tasik Prima
- Taman Puchong Tekali
- Taman Pinggiran Prima

ZONE 15

- Taman Perindustrian Puchong Utama
- Taman Puchong Utama

ZONE 16

- Taman Mutiara Puchong
- Lake Edge
- Pusat Bandar Puchong
- Puchong Batu 12
- Bandar Puteri Puchong

ZONE 17

- Taman Industri Pusat Bandar Puchong
- PKNS Puchong Batu 13 ½
- Taman Puchong Hartamas
- Puchong Batu 14
- Kampung Baru Puchong
- Bandar Puchong Utama
- Bandar Bukit Puchong
- Taman Saujana Puchong
- Taman Mutiara Indah
- Taman Puchong Impian

ZONE 18

- Bandar Kinrara
- Kem Tentera Kinrara
- Taman Puncak Jalil
- Taman Damai Utama

ZONE 19

- Taman Lestari Putra
- Pusat Perniagaan Suria Puchong
- Taman Desaminium, Kota Perdana
- Pusat Bandar Putra Permai
- Taman Dato Demang
- Taman Pinggiran Putra
- Taman Equine
- Taman Lestari Perdana
- Bandar Puchong South
- Pusat Perniagaan D’alpinia
- Pusat Perniagaan The Atmosphere
- Hutan Simpan Ayer Hitam (UPM)
- Taman Pertanian Universiti (UPM)

ZONE 20

- Taman Serdang Jaya
- Taman Perindustrian Serdang
- Taman Sri Serdang
- Universiti Putra Malaysia (UPM)

ZONE 21

- Taman Bukit Serdang Seksyen 1 – 3
- Taman Serdang Heights (Sungai Kuyoh) Seksyen 1 – 7
- Taman Universiti Indah
- Pusat Perdagangan Seri Kembangan

ZONE 22

- Taman Bukit Serdang Seksyen 4 - 11
- Taman Perindustrian Bukit Serdang Seksyen 14
- Kampung Baru Seri Kembangan
- Taman Jinma
- Taman Teknologi Malaysia
- Taman Perindustrian Putra Permai

ZONE 23

- Taman Serdang Raya
- Taman Serdang Perdana Seksyen 1 – 6
- Taman Muhibbah

ZONE 24

- Taman Sungai Besi Indah
- Taman Belimbing Indah
- Taman Serdang Lama
- The Mines Southern Lake
- The Mines Resort City

== Offices ==
- UEP Subang Jaya (Headquarters)
- Puteri Puchong
- Serdang Jaya
