= SMK Seri Kembangan =

School in Seri Kembangan, Selangor, Malaysia

Sekolah Menengah Kebangsaan Seri Kembangan 史里肯邦安国民中学

Location
- Jalan Sekolah; Seri Kembangan, Selangor, Petaling District 43300; Malaysia
- Coordinates: 3°2′0″N 101°43′42.67″E

Information
- Former name: SMJK (Inggeris) Serdang Bharu
- School type: Public school, government-owned
- Motto: Make Impossible Possible; Usaha Tangga Kejayaan ("Practice Makes Perfect")
- Established: February 19, 1965
- Founder: Mr T. Thiruaman
- Status: 1965 - Present
- School district: Petaling Perdana
- School code: BEB8659
- Chairman of Parent-Teacher Assosciation: Datuk Teo Geck Heng P.J.N, P.M.C.
- Principal: En. Lean Kee Fong
- Assistant Headmistress for Administrative Affairs: Pn. Rosyatina bt A Razak
- Assistant Headmistress for Co-Curicullum Affairs: Pn. Tunsiah bt Rahis
- Assistant Headmistress for Afternoon Session Affairs: Pn Lee Min Lin
- Teaching staff: 165 (2023/24)
- Age range: 13-17
- Enrollment: 3226 (2023/24)
- Language: English, Chinese, Malay, Tamil
- Houses: Merpati (Reds), Bangau (Blues), Helang (Greens), Kenyalang (Yellows), Jentayu (Orange)
- Colors: Blue, White
- Slogan: "SKrians Sehati Sejiwa"
- Song: "Usaha Tangga Kerjayaan"
- Athletics: Yes
- Nickname: "SMKSK", "SK"
- Team name: Merpati, Bangau, Helang, Kenyalang, Jentayu
- Yearbook: The "Kembangan" Book

SMK Seri Kembangan is a secondary school located in Seri Kembangan, Selangor, Malaysia, on top of a hill in Bukit Serdang. It was built in 1966 and officially opened on 19 November 1968 by the late Tunku Abdul Razak. It has 3,600 students and 200 staff.

The school is one of the 13 schools part of the Multimedia University foster schools.

== History ==
Originally, the school was named SMJK (Inggeris) Serdang Bharu. The reason for the name is attributed to the government policy of changing English secondary schools to national schools, with Bahasa Melayu as the medium of language.

In 2014, the school celebrated its golden jubilee.

The then principal of the school Tay Keng Lee, won the overseas teacher award by the Haihua Foundation and the Overseas Community Affairs Council of Taiwan after changing the schools disciplinary problems.

The school raised over RM1 million for a new auditorium.

Tay Keng Lee retired after serving as the school's principal for many years. While Mr Tay's position was succeeded by Madam Teo Boon Hwa on July 8, 2020.

On March 26, 2023, it was reported that the school might have been damaged due to continuous flooding in Seri Kembangan.

On December 14, 2024, the then-Headmistress, Madam Teo Boon Hwa retired. The school was then reported facing shortages of administratives including the positions of Headmistress, Assistant Headmistress for Administration, and three GKMPs (Guru Ketua Mata Pelajaran).

== SK Winds ==
SK Winds is the school's wind orchestra which simultaneously is also a marching band. The decades old band have taken part in many competitions in various states, including once in Singapore. Occasionally they would host their very own concerts and participate in festivals within Seri Kembangan. Recently, they have been proudly selected to perform at the 2017 SEA Games Opening Ceremony and the national-level Independence Day parade in Putrajaya.

== Achievements ==
- New Era University College 2018 Tian Xing Jian Chinese Award finalist

== Facilities ==
=== Blocks A and B ===
- Block A is located beside the main school hall. It serves mainly as the venue of the living skills department (kemahiran hidup). It also houses the prayer room (Surau) and the Tamil language class room.
- Block B includes the administrative building, disciplinary department, printing room, book shop, student's toilet and nine classrooms.
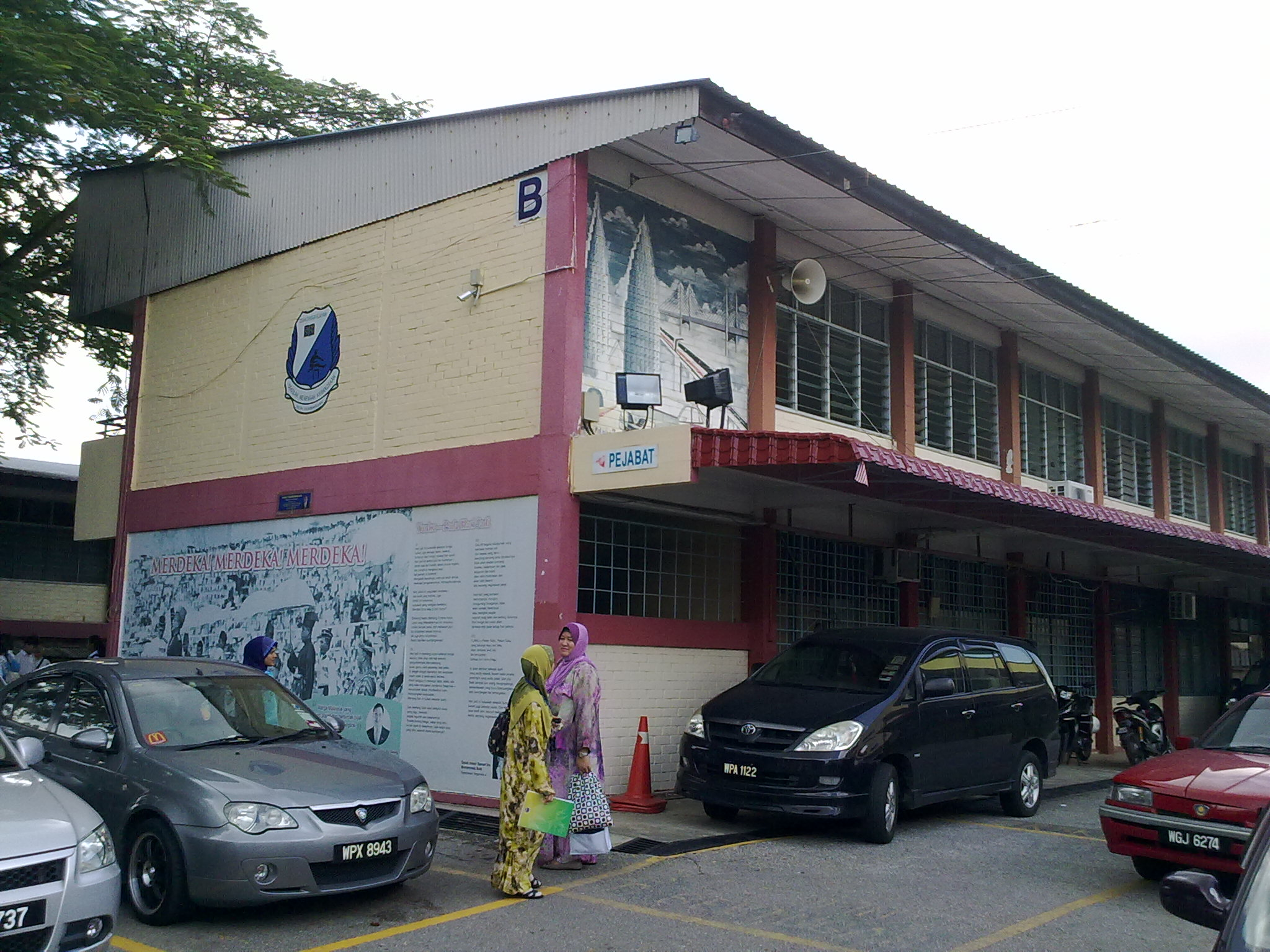
Block B (left wing)

=== Blocks D and E ===
- Block D houses the library, computer lab, living skills class room (ERT), data room, two science labs and 5 class rooms.
- Block E houses two science labs and eight classrooms.
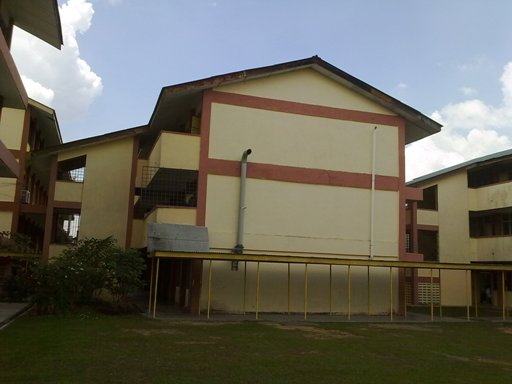
Block E

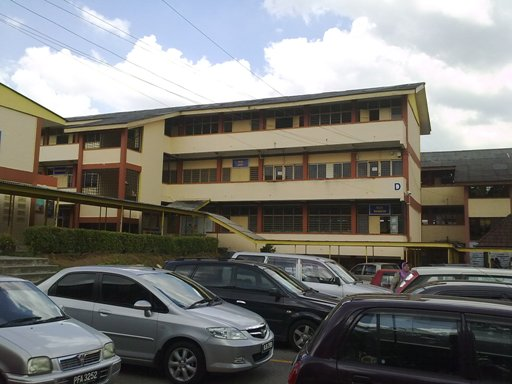
Block D

=== Blocks C and F ===
- Block C serves as the school mini hall. It also houses the co-op (Koperasi), school band room and also the Counseling Room.
- Block F houses nine classrooms and a students' toilet.
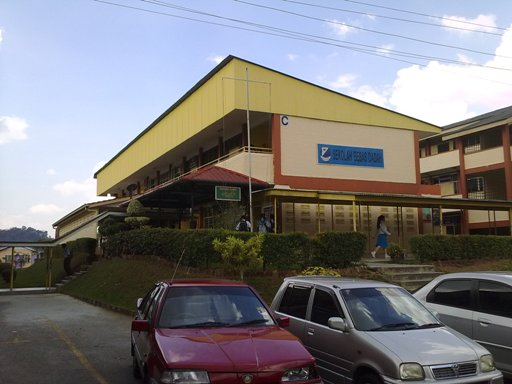
Block C

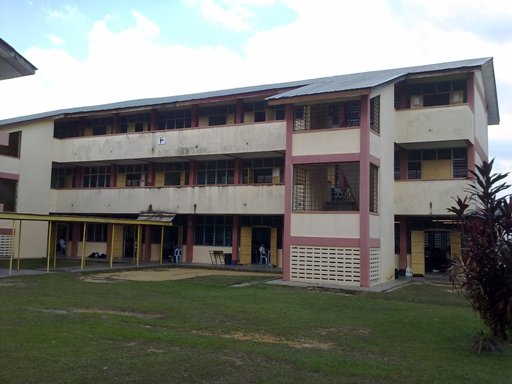
Block F

=== Block G and H ===
- Block G houses the teaching staff room, Resource Room and staff toilet.
- Block H has two classrooms and a religious study room (Islamic).
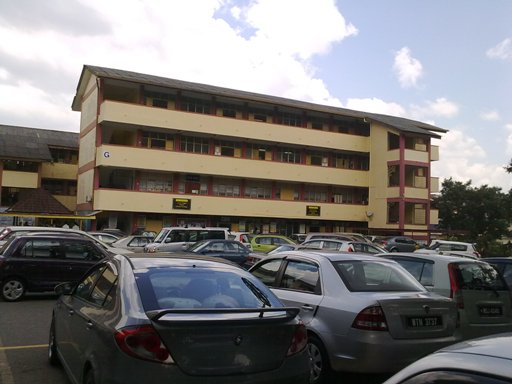
Block G

=== Other infrastructure ===
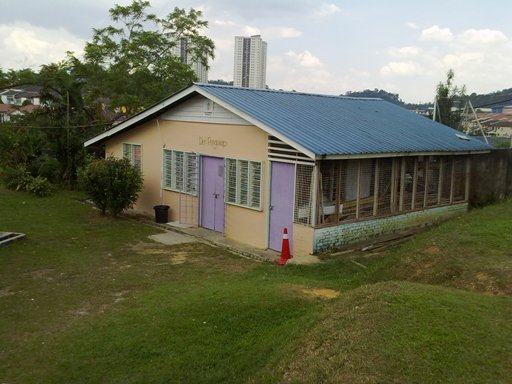
Scouts' den

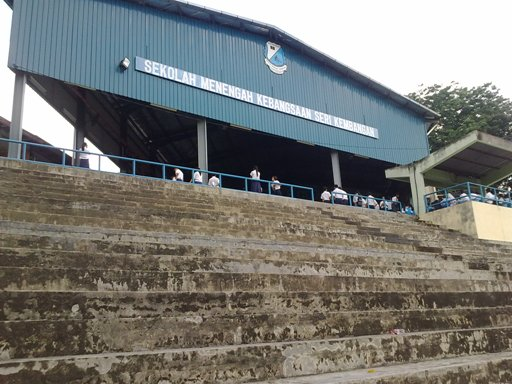
Main hall

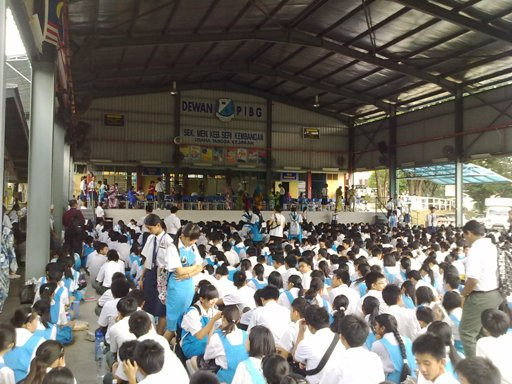
Main hall (interior)

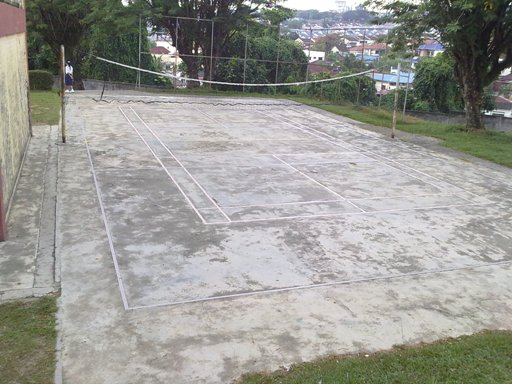
Volleyball court

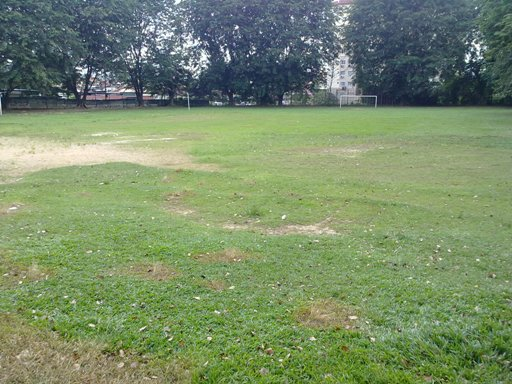
School field

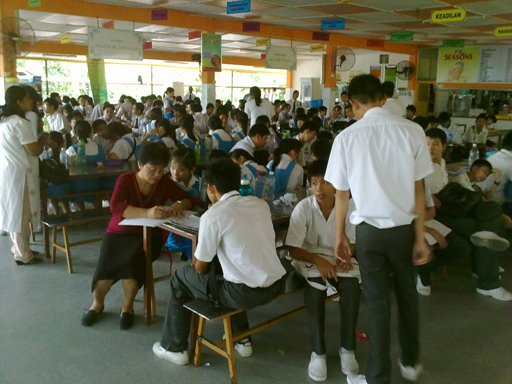
Cafeteria

== Uniforms ==
There are 10 co-curricular uniforms in the school. They are:

- St. John
- Red Crescent Society
- Police Cadet
- School Youth Cadet
- Firefighter Cadet
- Scouts
- Marching band
- Chinese Orchestra
