= Serdang Jaya MRT station =

Metro station in Selangor, Malaysia

PY33 Serdang Jaya
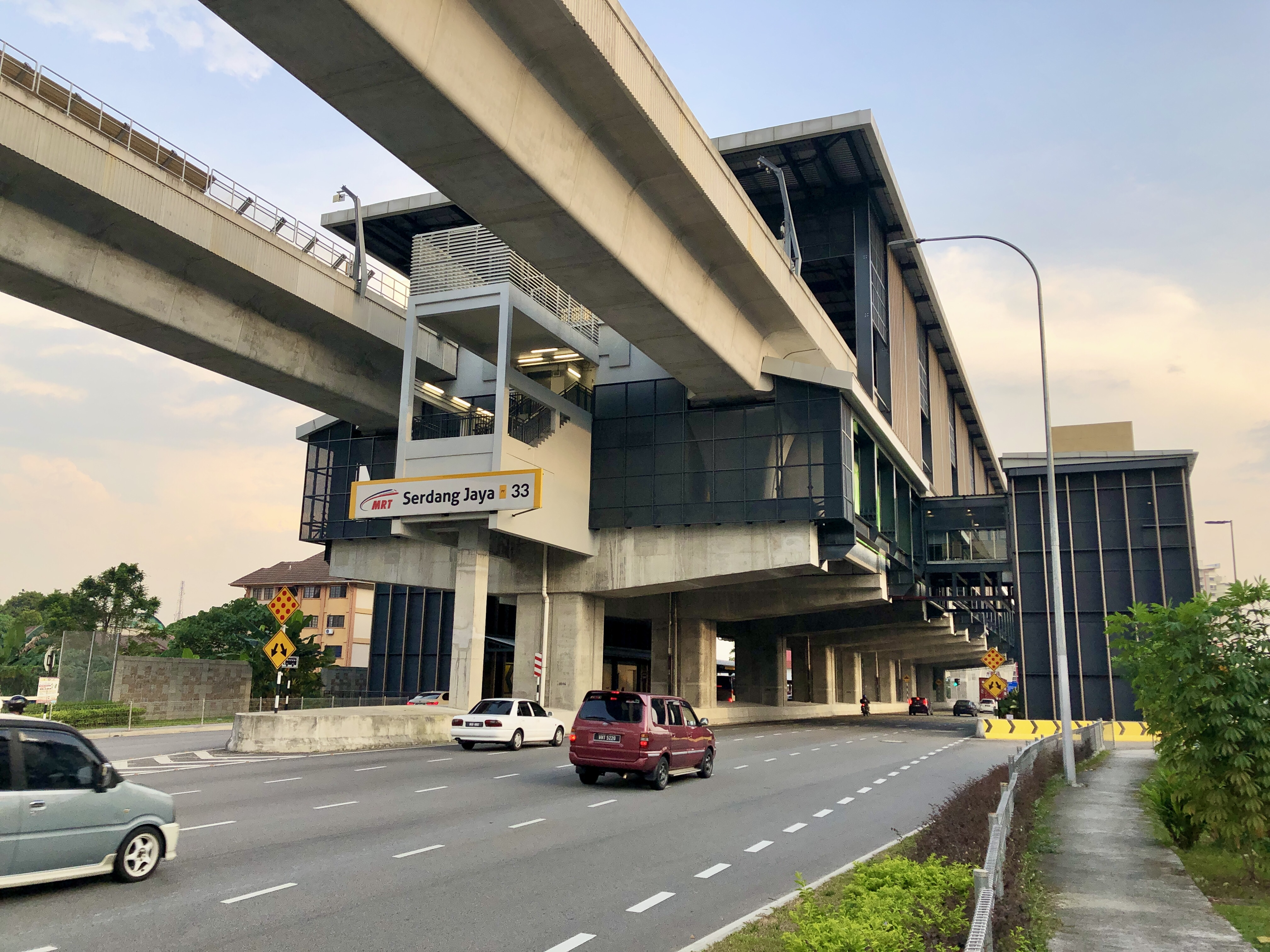

General information
- Other names: Malay: سردڠ جاي (Jawi); Chinese: 沙登再也; Tamil: செர்டாங் ஜெயா
- Location: Jalan Sri Serdang, 43400 Seri Kembangan; Selangor; Malaysia
- System: Rapid KL
- Owner: MRT Corp
- Operator: Rapid Rail
- Line: 12 Putrajaya Line
- Platforms: 1 island platform
- Tracks: 2

Construction
- Accessible: Yes

Other information
- Status: Operational
- Station code: PY33

History
- Opened: 16 March 2023; 3 years ago

Services
Preceding station		Following station
Serdang Raya Selatan towards Kwasa Damansara	Putrajaya Line	UPM towards Putrajaya Sentral
Location

The Serdang Jaya MRT station is a mass rapid transit (MRT) station serving Seri Kembangan in Selangor, Malaysia. It is one of the stations being built as part of the Klang Valley Mass Rapid Transit (KVMRT) project on the MRT Putrajaya Line.

== Location ==
The station is located on Jalan Sri Serdang near the Seri Kembangan Fire and Rescue station.

== Connection with KTM Komuter ==
This station is about 2 km (1 ¼ mile) east of the Serdang Komuter station, the closest approach between the Putrajaya Line and Batu Caves–Pulau Sebang Line in the south. The Putrajaya Line does connect directly with the Batu Caves-Pulau Sebang Line at Kampung Batu station which is 16 stations to the north of Serdang Jaya.

Passengers from the Serdang Komuter station can connect to this MRT station via bus routes 540 and SJ04 and stop at Serdang Fire Station. For passengers coming in the opposite direction, they have to board the feeder bus T565 and stop at the bus stop in Taman Muhibbah (the feeder bus does not stop at Serdang Komuter station) and then walk through an overhead bridge to the Komuter station. Alternatively, buses T565 or T569 stop at The Mines shopping mall, which is about 10 minutes walk via the Taman Sungai Besi Indah Section 4 commercial area to the Komuter station.

Passengers can also instead ride the Putrajaya Line to Sungai Besi station and interchange with LRT Sri Petaling Line to Bandar Tasik Selatan station where the station connects with Batu Caves-Pulau Sebang Line, KLIA Transit and the Southern Integrated Terminal (TBS) bus hub.

== Bus Services ==
=== Feeder buses ===
Route No.	Origin	Desitination	Via	Connecting to
T565	PY33 Serdang Jaya (Entrance A)	Taman Sungai Besi Indah	Jalan SK 12/1; Jalan Seri Kembangan; The Mines Mall; Jalan SB Indah 4 Jalan SB Indah 2 Kajang Dispersal Link Expressway; Jalan Muhibbah	T571, T569, 590, SJ04, SJ05
T569	PY33 Serdang Jaya (Entrance A)	KG30 Batu 11 Cheras	Taman Taming Jaya; Jalan Seri Kembangan; The Mines Mall; Balakong; Taman Bukit Belimbing; Kajang Dispersal Link Expressway; Taman Sungai Besi Indah	T571, T569, T416, T417 590, SJ04, SJ05

=== Other buses ===
Certain bus drivers especially Smart Selangor buses may skip entering MRT Serdang Jaya bus stop unless requested by the passenger. Passengers may board the bus near the Seri Kembangan Police Station, which is 100m walk away from station to avoid any missed trips.

Route No.	Operator	Origin	Desitination	Via	Connecting to
540	Rapid KL	KB05 Serdang	Putra Permai, Equine Park	Jalan Seri Kembangan; PY33 Serdang Jaya (Entrance A) (Putra Permai-bound only); Jalan SK 12/1; Jalan Putra Permai; Jalan Indah; Jalan Pinggiran Putra; PY36 Taman Equine; AEON Mall Equine Park; Persiaran Equine Perdana	541, SJ05, T542, T543, T571
SJ04	Smart Selangor	KB05 Serdang	Serdang Hospital	Jalan Seri Kembangan; PY33 Serdang Jaya (Entrance A) (Serdang Hospital-bound only); Jalan SK 12/1; Jalan Raya 5 Jalan Raya 6 Jalan Sri Serdang; UPM Mosque; Universiti Putra Malaysia; MARDI	540, T568, SPG04
SJ05	Smart Selangor	Putra Permai, Equine Park	The Park, Bukit Serdang	Jalan Seri Kembangan; AEON Mall Equine Park; Jalan Indah; Jalan BS 3/1; Jalan Aman; Jalan SK 13/2; Jalan 14/3; Jalan Kasturi; Jalan Cemara; Jalan Pasar; PY33 Serdang Jaya (Entrance A) (Putra Permai-bound only); Jalan Raya 2 PKNS Apartments; Jalan Raya 4 Jalan SK 6/1	541, T543, T561
