= Serdang railway station =

Railway station in Serdang, Malaysia

Coordinates: 3°01′24″N 101°42′58″E

Serdang

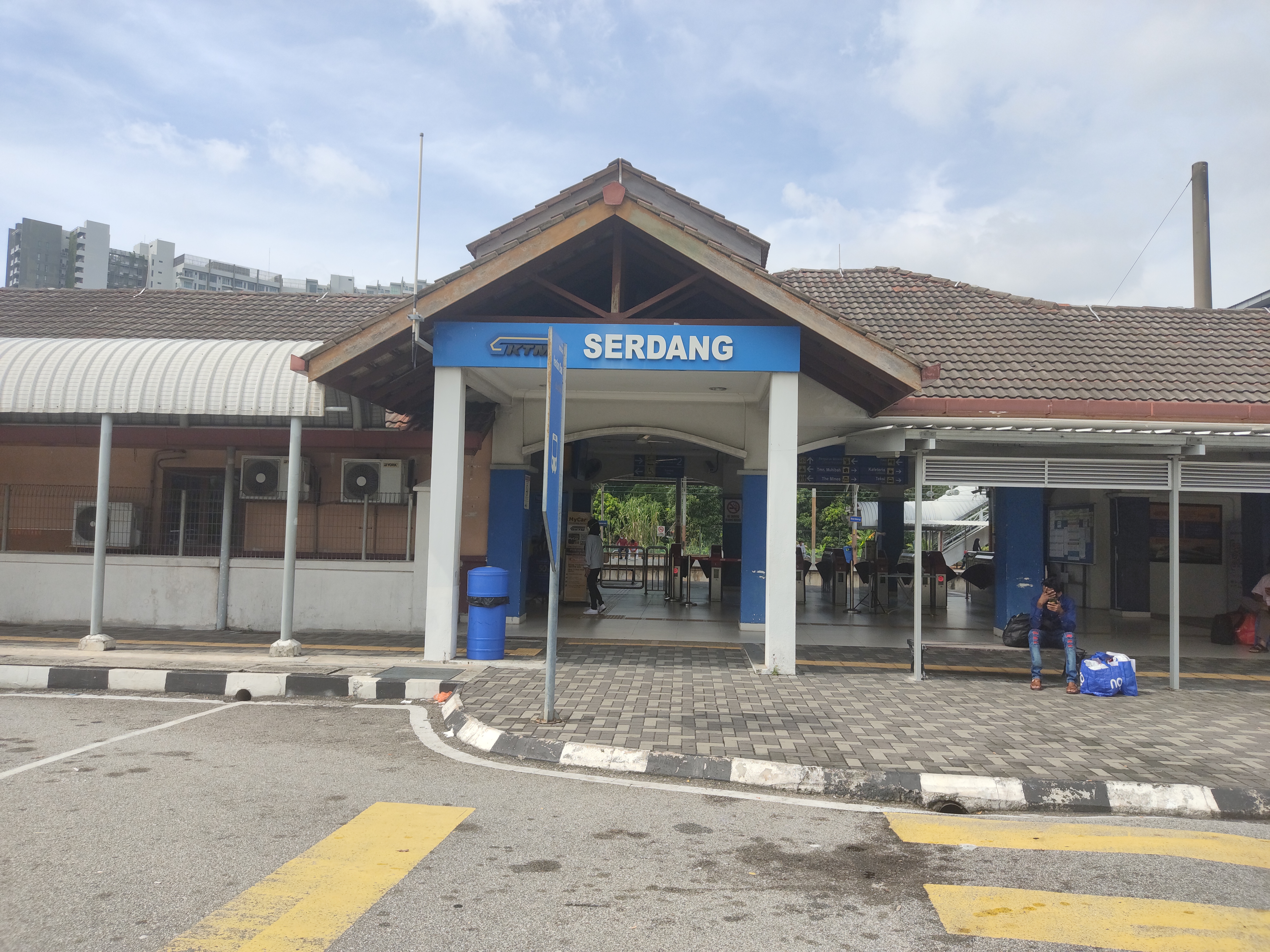
- Serdang railway station

General information
- Other names: Malay: سردڠ (Jawi); Chinese: 沙登; Tamil: செர்டாங்
- Location: Serdang, Selangor, Malaysia.
- System: KB05 | Commuter rail station
- Owner: Railway Assets Corporation
- Operator: Keretapi Tanah Melayu
- Line: West Coast Line
- Platforms: 2 side platforms
- Tracks: 4
- Connections: RapidKL: T571590540; KR Travel & Tours: 523; Smart Selangor: SJ04

Construction
- Structure type: At-grade
- Parking: Available
- Accessible: Yes

Other information
- Station code: KB05

History
- Rebuilt: 1995
- Electrified: 1995

Services
Preceding station	Keretapi Tanah Melayu (Komuter)	Following station
Bandar Tasik Selatan towards Batu Caves	Batu Caves–Pulau Sebang Line	Kajang towards Pulau Sebang/Tampin
Location

The Serdang Komuter station is a KTM Komuter train station located in Serdang, Selangor, Malaysia.

The station serves KTM Komuter's Seremban Line and also previously KTM Intercity. It is located along the Besraya Expressway.

== Connection with MRT Putrajaya Line ==
This station is near, but does not interchange with, the Serdang Jaya station on the MRT Putrajaya line which is located 2 km (1.25 mile) west of this Komuter station.

Feeder bus routes T565 and T569 from MRT station do not stop at this station. Passengers from MRT Serdang Jaya station can board the bus T565 and stop at Flat Taman Muhhibah which has a link bridge to Serdang Komuter station, while from the Komuter station they can either board the Smart Selangor bus SJ04 or Rapid KL 540 and stop at Serdang Fire Station bus stop which is nearby the MRT Serdang Jaya station.

== Bus Routes ==
Serdang Komuter station is a major bus hub.

Route No.	Operator	Origin	Desitination	Via	Connecting to
T 523	KR Travel & Tours	KT3 PY41 Putrajaya Sentral	Mydin Sinar Kota, Kuala Lumpur (Hub Lebuh Pudu) ( AG7 SP7 KJ13 LRT Masjid Jamek)	Jalan Enggang P9; Jalan Tempua P9B; Lebuh Perdana Barat; Dataran Putra; Alamanda Putrajaya; IOI City Mall; Serdang Hospital; Sungai Besi Expressway; KB05 Serdang KTM station KJ14 KG16 LRT/MRT Pasar Seni	100, 103, 107, 120, 121, 122, 150, 151, 153, 400; 450, 503, 506, P107, P108, T508, T509, T510, T511, T512; BET2, BET5, BET6, BET8, BET13
540	Rapid KL	KB05 KTM Komuter Serdang	Putra Permai, Equine Park	Jalan Seri Kembangan; PY33 Serdang Jaya MRT Station Gate A (bound to Putra Permai only); Jalan SK 12/1; Jalan Putra Permai; Jalan Indah; Jalan Pinggiran Putra; PY36 Taman Equine MRT station AEON Mall Equine Park; Persiaran Equine Perdana	541, SJ05, T542, T543, T565, T571
590	Rapid KL	Bandar Sungai Long	Mydin Sinar Kota, Kuala Lumpur (Hub Lebuh Pudu) ( AG7 SP7 KJ13 LRT Masjid Jamek)	Jalan Sungai Long; Persiaran Mahkota Cheras 2 (Sungai Long bound only); Jalan Temenggung (Sungai Long bound only); Jalan Balakong; Kajang Dispersal Link Expressway; The Mines Mall; KB05 Serdang KTM station Sungai Besi Expressway; PY27 Kuchai MRT station (KL bound only); Jalan Chan Sow Lin; AG11 SP11 PY24 Chan Sow Lin LRT/MRT station Jalan Pudu	100, 103, 107, 120, 121, 122, 150, 151, 153, 400, 450, T585; T586, T587, T588, BET2, BET5, BET6, BET8
SJ04	Smart Selangor	KB05 KTM Komuter Serdang	Serdang Hospital	Jalan Seri Kembangan; PY33 Serdang Jaya MRT station Gate A (bound to Serdang Hospital only); Jalan SK 12/1; Jalan Raya 5 Jalan Raya 6 Jalan Sri Serdang; UPM Mosque; Universiti Putra Malaysia; MARDI	540, T568, SPG04
T571	Rapid KL	KB05 KTM Komuter Serdang (opposite)	Taman Sri Pulai		T565

== Around the station ==
- Mines Wellness City

== Gallery ==
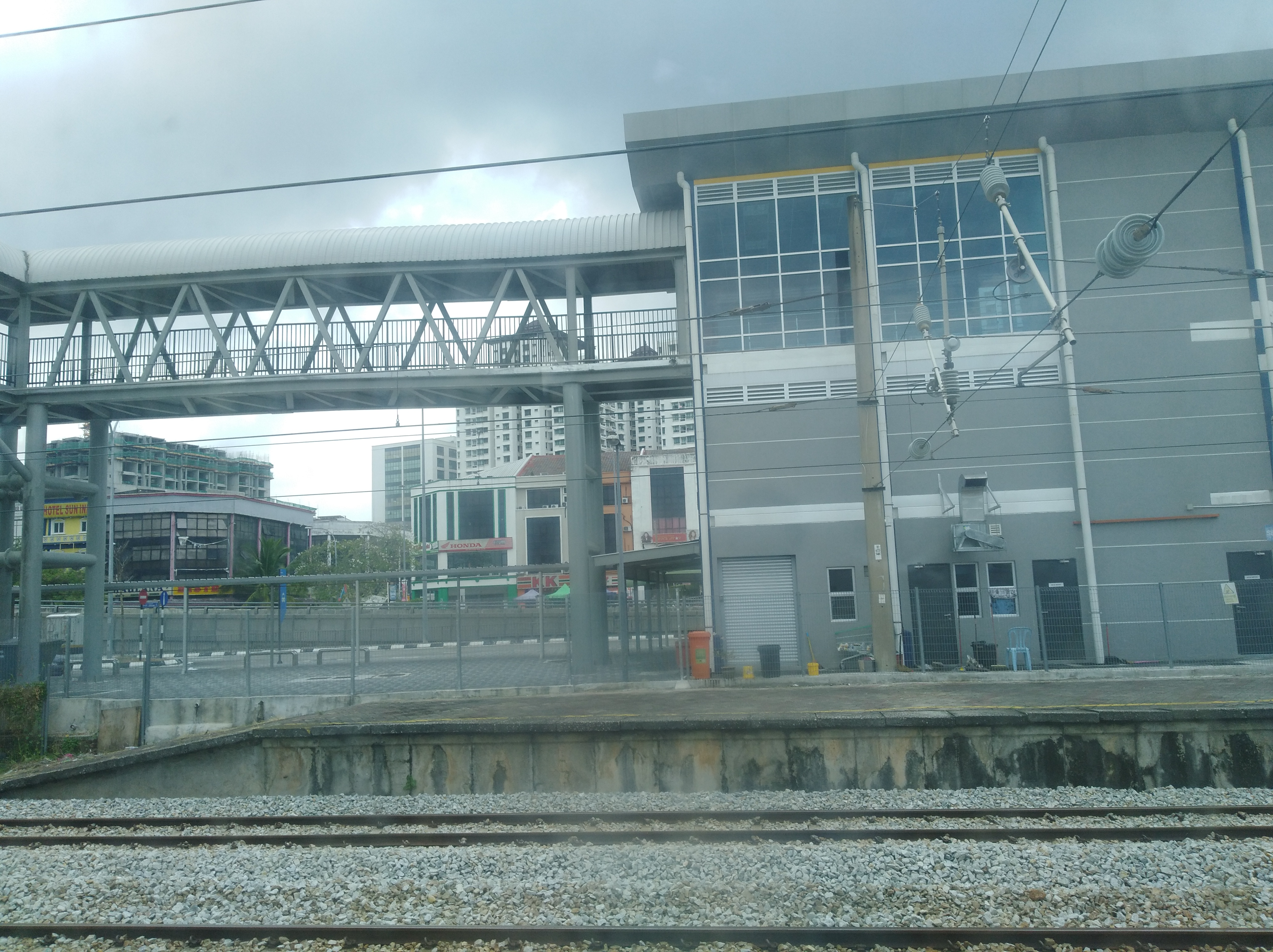
New station building

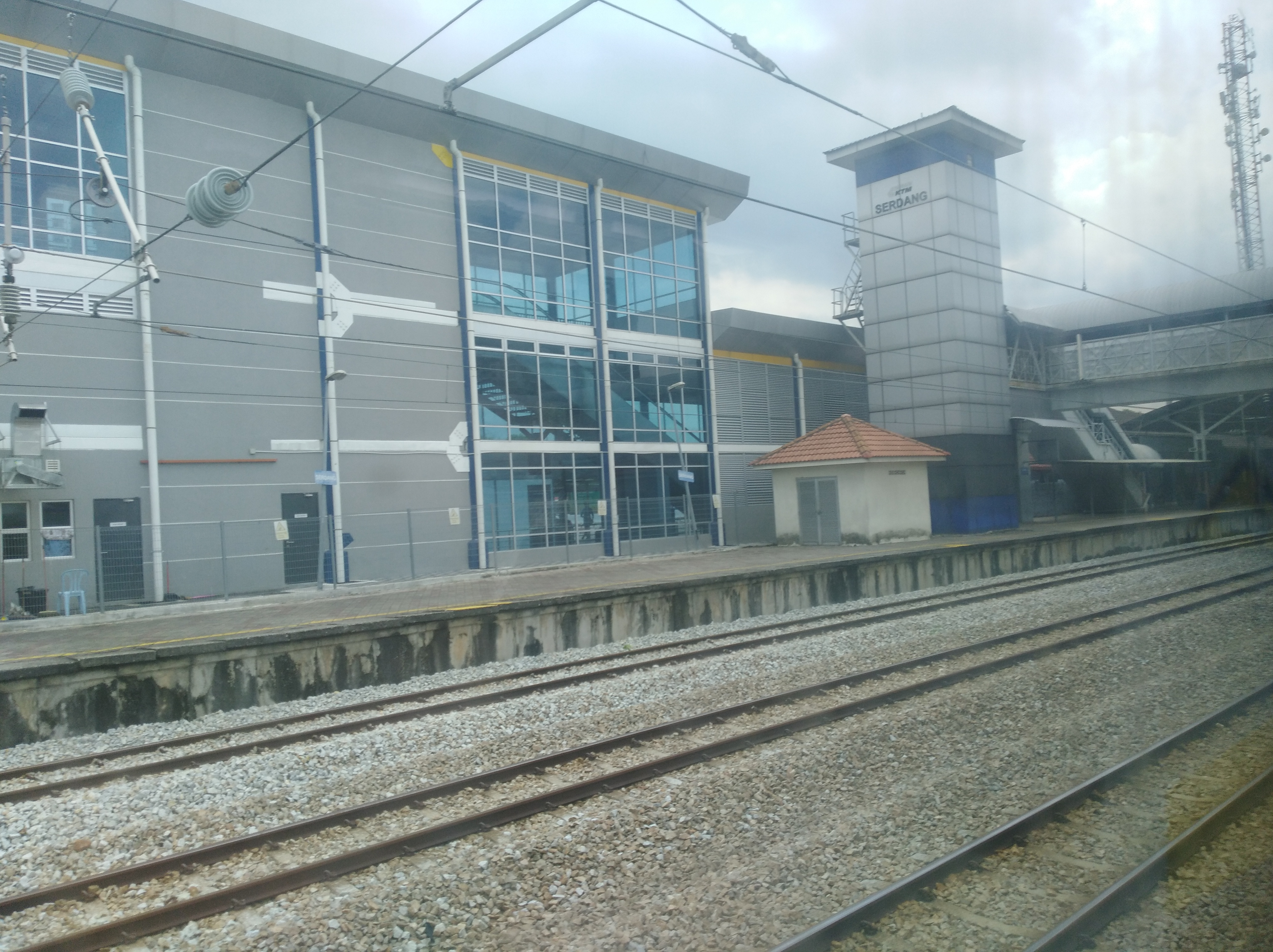
New station platform

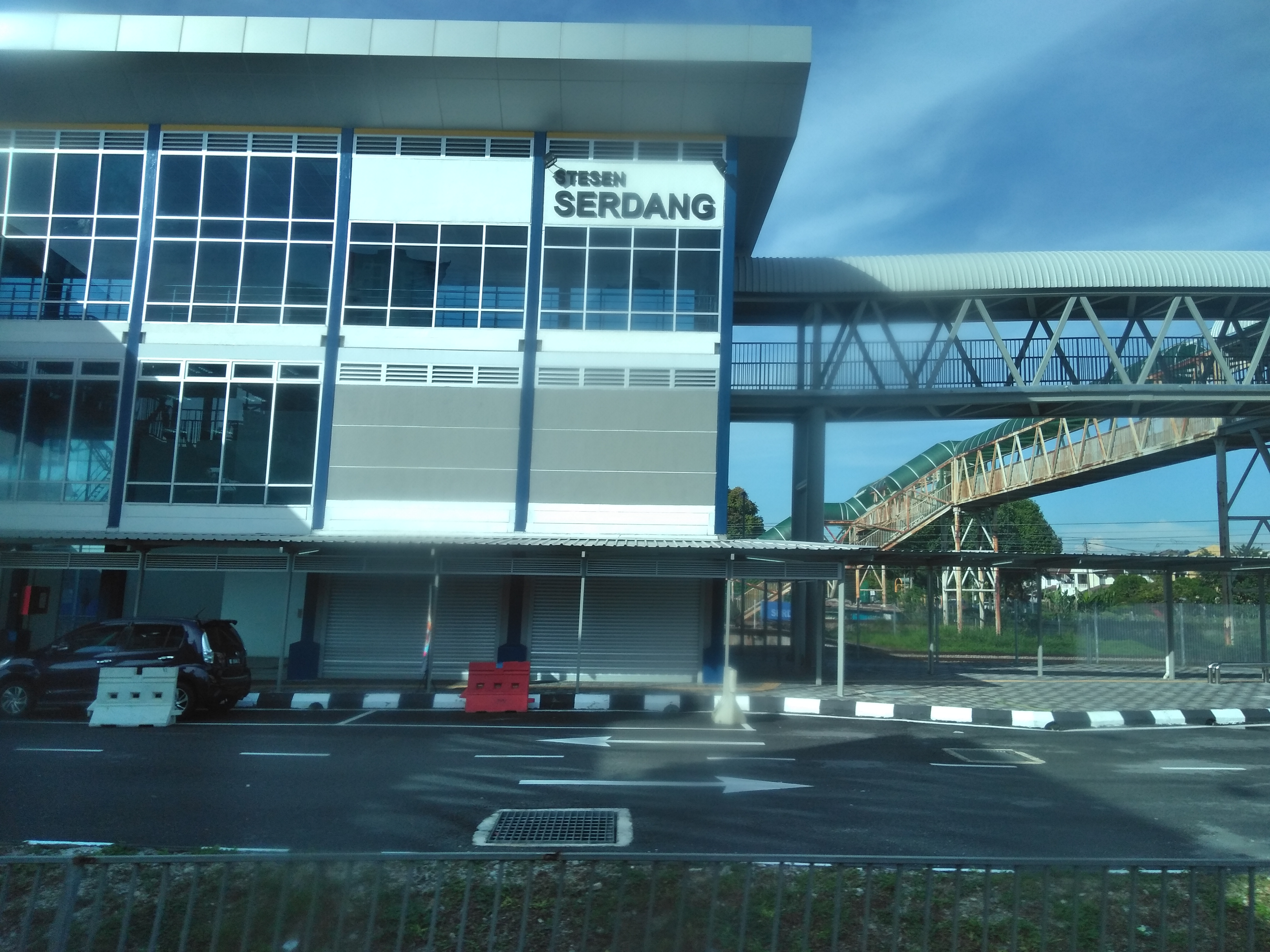

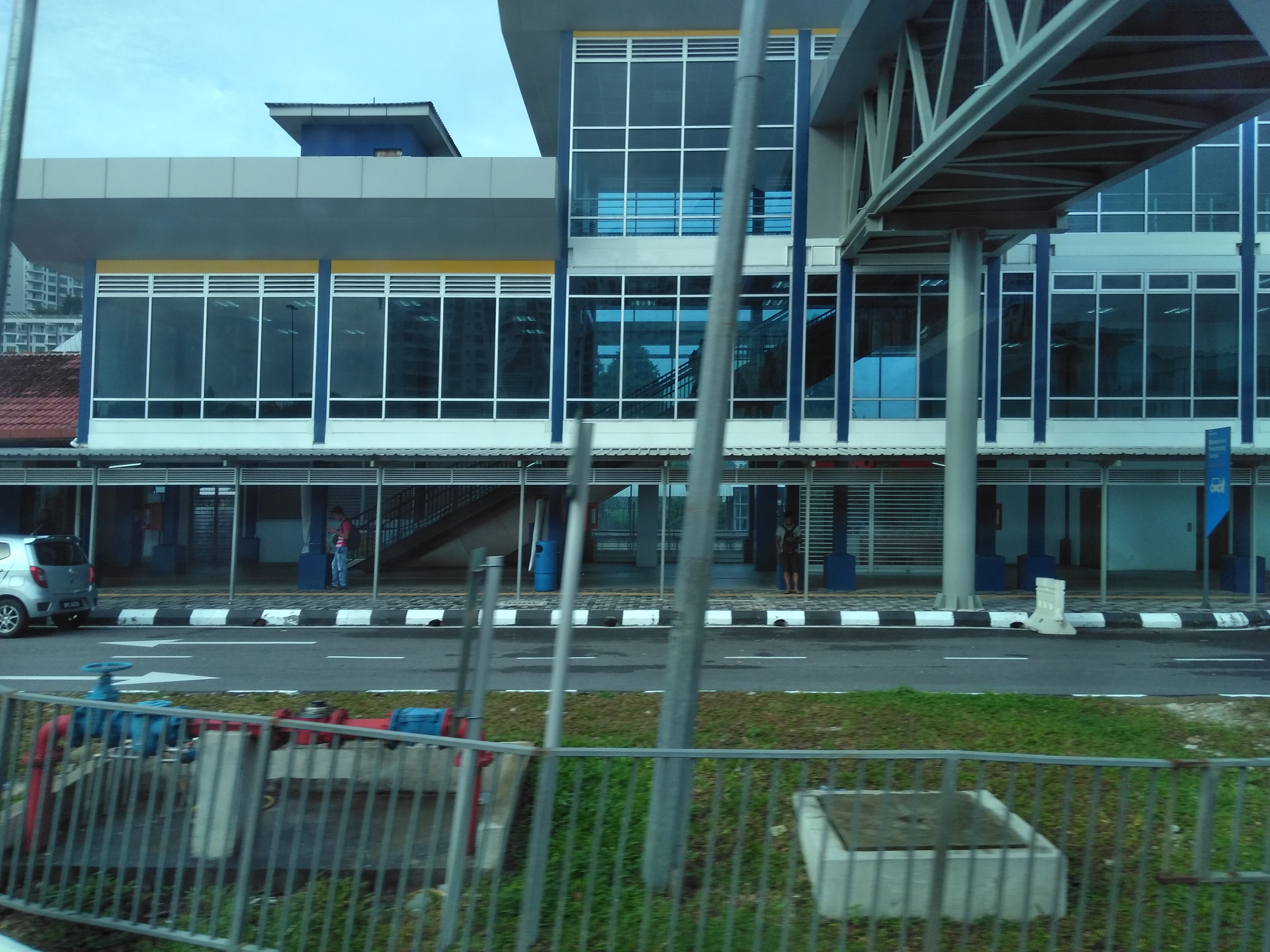

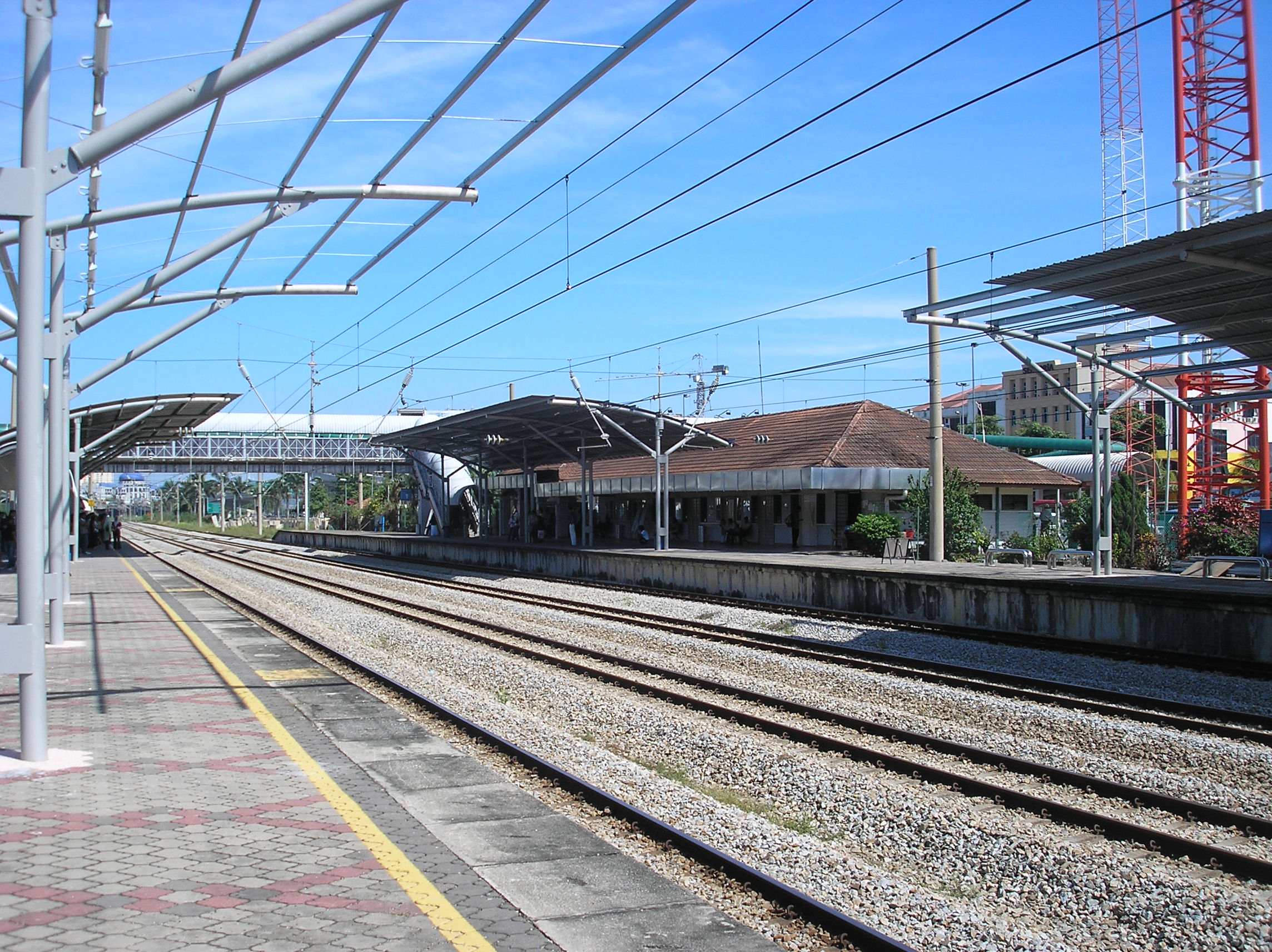
Old station platform
