= Seri Kembangan =

- Town
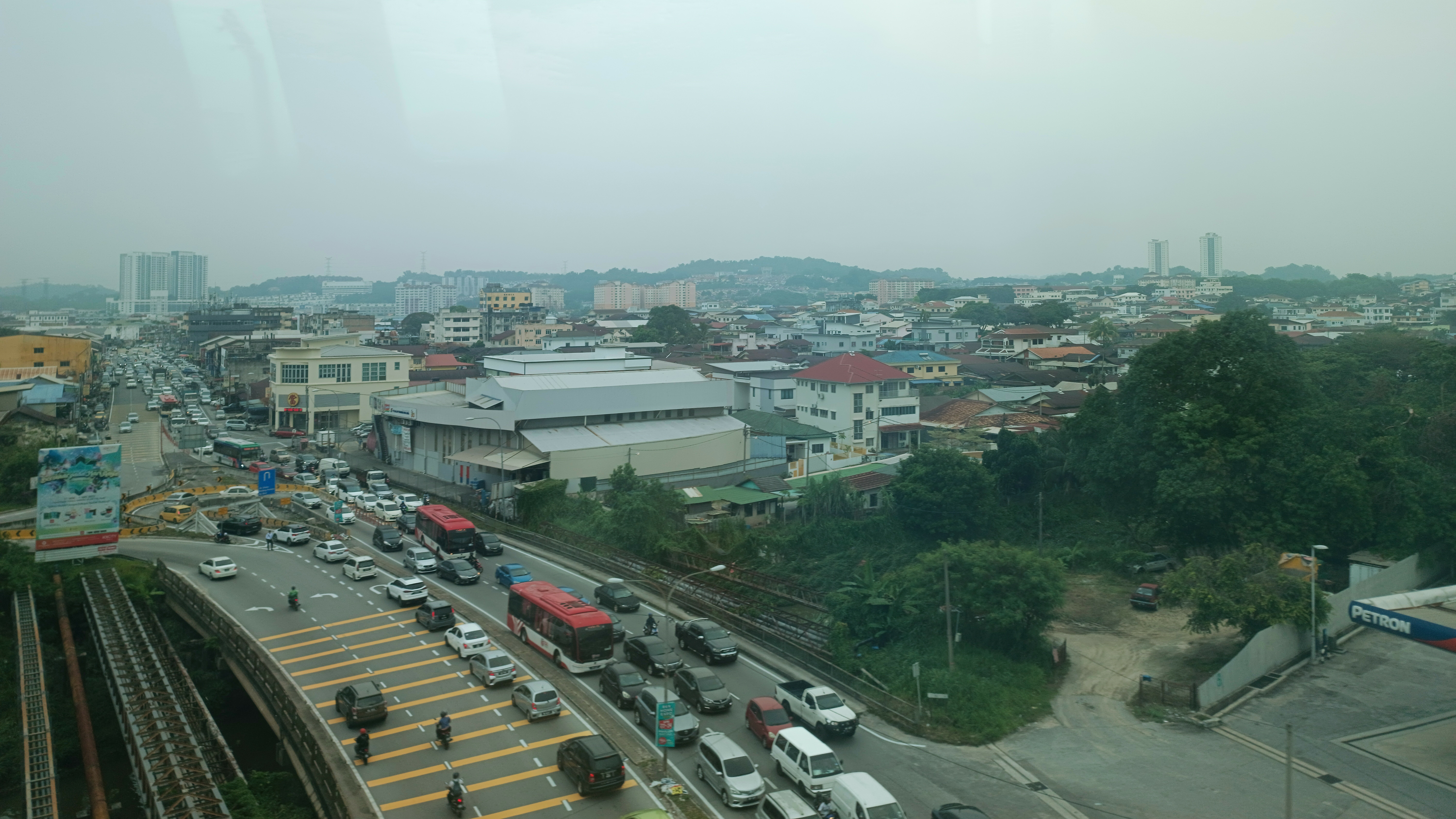
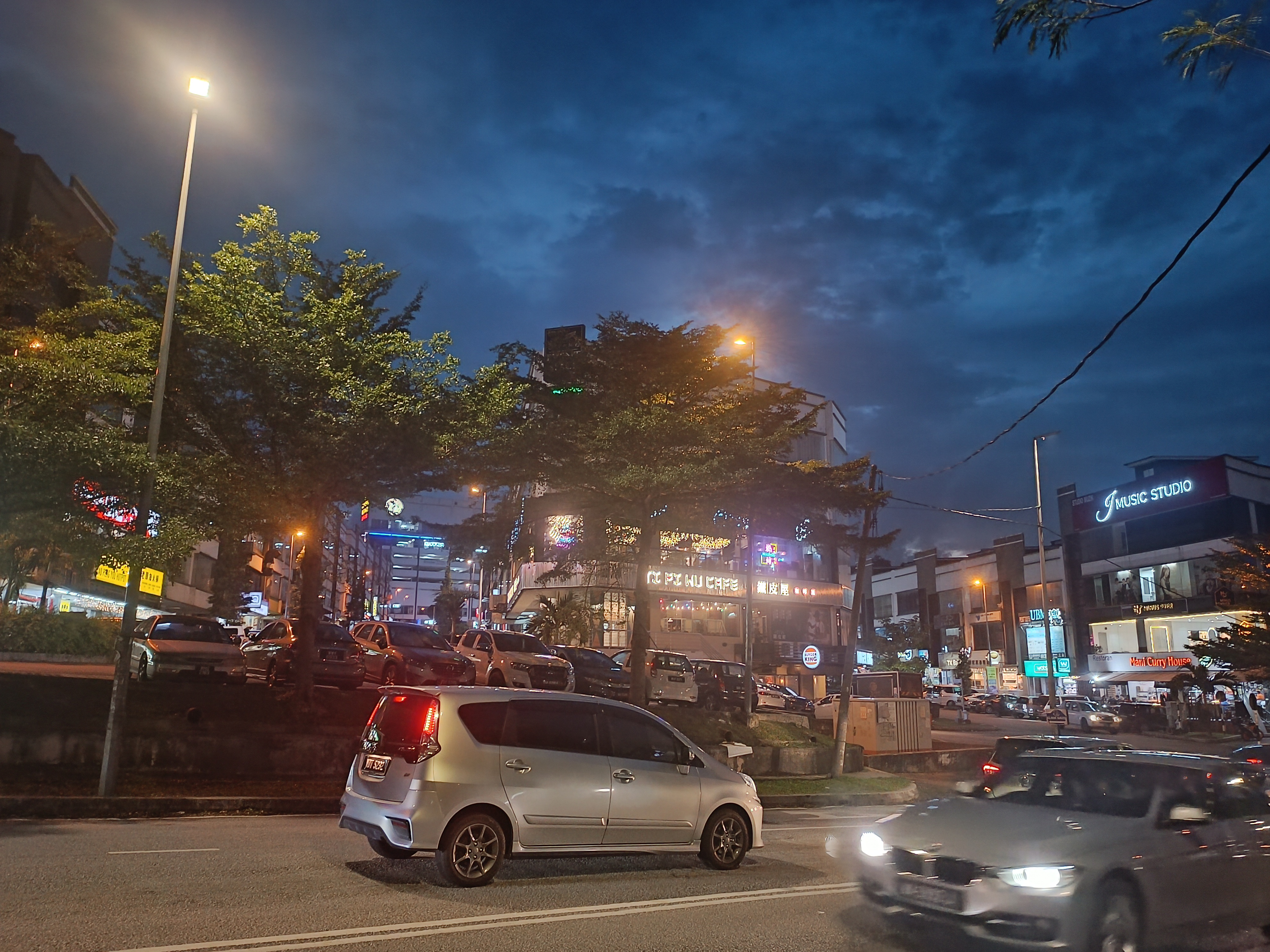
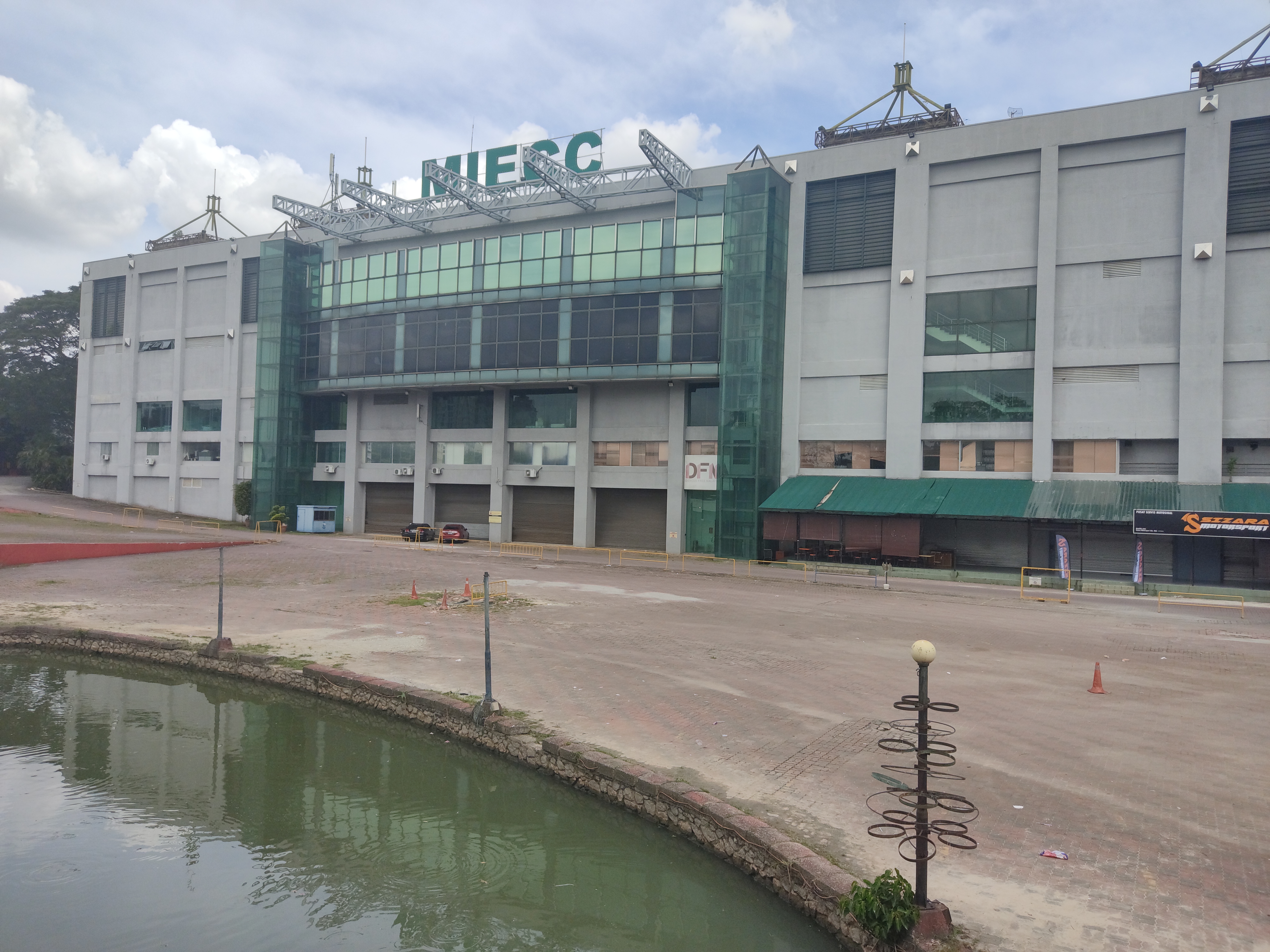
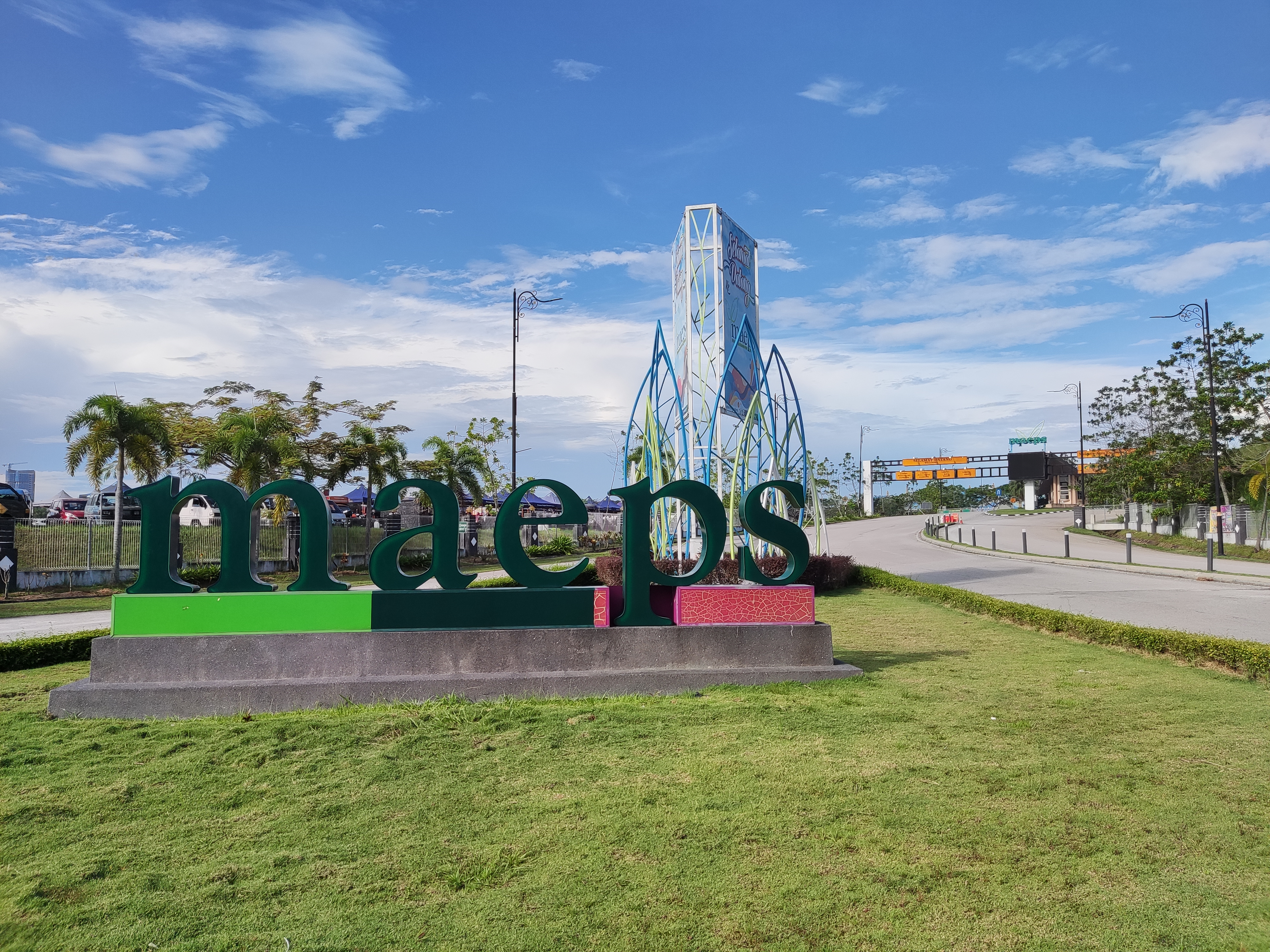
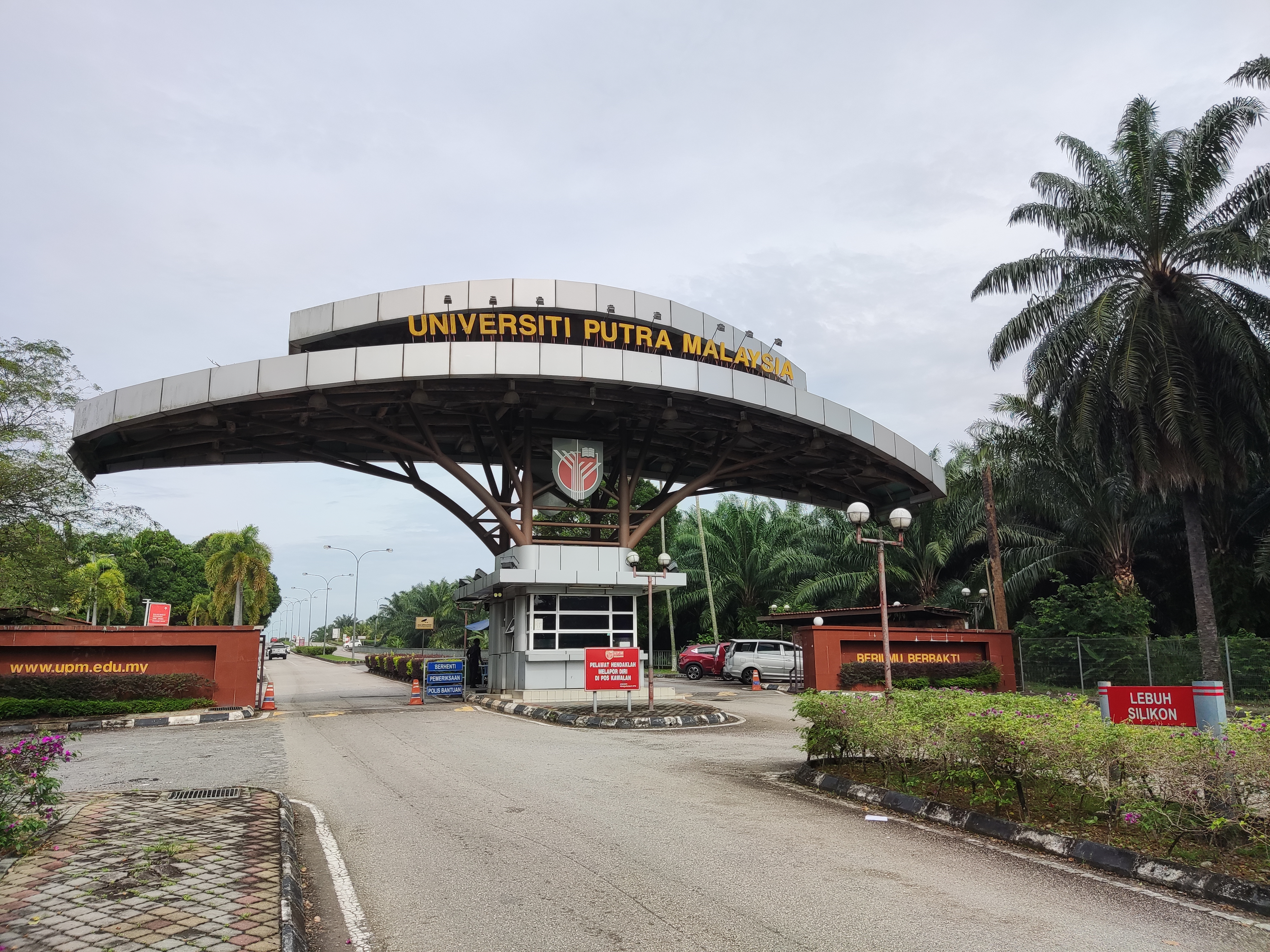

- Location of Seri Kembangan in Malaysia Seri Kembangan (Malaysia)
- Coordinates: 3°00′57″N 101°42′02″E
- Country: Malaysia
- State: Selangor
- District: Petaling; Hulu Langat; Sepang

Government
  - Subang Jaya Municipal Council President: Dato' Nor Hisham Ahmad Dahlan
  - Member of Parliament: Y.B. Yeo Bee Yin (DAP) - Puchong
  - Assemblyman: Y.B Ean Yong Hian Wah (DAP) - Seri Kembangan
- Time zone: UTC8 (MST)
- ZIP Code: 43300 (Seri Kembangan); 43400 (Serdang)
- Area code: +6-03-89

Seri Kembangan is a suburb located in Petaling District, Selangor, Malaysia. It is located in between Kuala Lumpur and Putrajaya. The town is now a considerable city in size. It is located near the northern end of the PLUS Expressway Southern Route.

== History ==
Serdang New Village was the first town to be established in Seri Kembangan in 1950 when the British moved Malaysian Chinese villagers living around Sungai Besi to a centralised location due to the Communist threat during the Malayan Emergency as part of the Briggs Plan.

In its early days, the village had 50 houses and all were built from scratch because the British only provided empty plots of land. The area was close to rubber estates and the jungle posed dangers of a different kind. Most of the 15,000 inhabitants earned meagre incomes as mining workers and rubber tappers.

At one point, the Serdang New Village was known for cottage industries like shoe-making and type settings services but this has been overtaken by more profitable ventures.

There are now 2,500 houses with only a smattering of the original wooden houses left and the population is estimated to be 150,000, largely made up of entrepreneurs, businessmen, professionals, government servants who are working in Putrajaya and other multinational corporations employees located in Cyberjaya.

The only form of entertainment around the vicinity in the 1950s until the 1970s was a cinema.

After the 1998 Commonwealth Games, more developments took place from 2000 onwards and other prominent developments includes AEON Equine Park, McDonald's, Pasar Borong Selangor (wholesale market), Maybank, Giant Hypermarket and other businesses transformed this area into a business hub.

== Climate and weather ==
Protected by the Titiwangsa Mountains in the east and Indonesia's Sumatra Island in the west, Seri Kembangan has a tropical rainforest climate (Köppen climate classification Af) which is warm and sunny, along with abundant rainfall, especially during the northeast monsoon season from October to March. Temperatures tend to remain constant. Maximums hover between 31 and 33 °C (88 and 91 °F) and have never exceeded 39.3 °C (102.7 °F), while minimums hover between 22 and 23.5 °C (71.6 and 74.3 °F) and have never fallen below 14.4 °C (57.9 °F). Seri Kembangan typically receives minimum 2,600 mm (100 in) of rain annually; June and July are relatively dry, but even then rainfall typically exceeds 133 millimetres (5.2 in) per month.

Climate data for Subang Jaya (Approximation 5 km distance from Seri Kembangan)
Month	Jan	Feb	Mar	Apr	May	Jun	Jul	Aug	Sep	Oct	Nov	Dec	Year
Record high °C (°F)	36 (97)	37 (99)	37 (99)	36 (97)	36 (97)	36 (97)	36 (97)	36 (97)	35 (95)	35 (95)	35 (95)	35 (95)	37 (99)
Mean daily maximum °C (°F)	32.1 (89.8)	32.9 (91.2)	33.2 (91.8)	33.1 (91.6)	32.9 (91.2)	32.7 (90.9)	32.3 (90.1)	32.3 (90.1)	32.1 (89.8)	32.1 (89.8)	31.6 (88.9)	31.5 (88.7)	32.4 (90.3)
Mean daily minimum °C (°F)	22.5 (72.5)	22.8 (73.0)	23.2 (73.8)	23.7 (74.7)	23.9 (75.0)	23.6 (74.5)	23.2 (73.8)	23.1 (73.6)	23.2 (73.8)	23.2 (73.8)	23.2 (73.8)	22.9 (73.2)	23.2 (73.8)
Record low °C (°F)	18 (64)	20 (68)	20 (68)	21 (70)	21 (70)	20 (68)	19 (66)	20 (68)	20 (68)	21 (70)	21 (70)	19 (66)	18 (64)
Average rainfall mm (inches)	192 (7.6)	181 (7.1)	251 (9.9)	292 (11.5)	191 (7.5)	133 (5.2)	136 (5.4)	155 (6.1)	197 (7.8)	258.5 (10.18)	297 (11.7)	246.9 (9.72)	2,530.4 (99.62)
Average rainy days (≥ 1.0 mm)	11	12	14	16	13	9	10	11	13	16	18	15	158
Mean monthly sunshine hours	186.0	194.9	207.7	198.0	207.7	195.0	201.5	189.1	165.0	170.5	153.0	161.2	2,229.6
Source 1: Jabatan Meteorologi Malaysia – Subang 1961–2010
Source 2: World Meteorological Organisation (UN, 1971–2000) — Source #3: Hong Kong Observatory (sun only, 1961–1990)

== Governance ==
=== Local authority ===
Seri Kembangan is under the jurisdiction of three local authorities;

- The central area of Seri Kembangan, like Bandar Putra Permai, Taman Equine, Taman Lestari Perdana, Taman Puncak Jalil, Taman Bukit Serdang, Taman Serdang Raya, Taman Serdang Jaya, Taman Sungai Besi Indah, Universiti Putra Malaysia (UPM), and Mines Wellness City, is under the Subang Jaya City Council (MBSJ) in Petaling District (Petaling subdistrict),
- The eastern part of Seri Kembangan, like Taman Desa Serdang, Taman Taming Jaya, Taman Desa Karunmas, Taman Impian Ehsan, and Kampung Baru Balakong, is under the Kajang Municipal Council (MPKj) in Hulu Langat District (Cheras subdistrict) and
- The southern part of Seri Kembangan, like Taman Prima Tropika, Taman Lestari Permai, Taman Suria Tropika, Malaysia Agro Exposition Park Serdang (MAEPS), Sultan Idris Shah Serdang Hospital, and Faculty of Agriculture UPM, is under the Sepang Municipal Council (MPSepang) in Sepang District (Dengkil subdistrict).

=== Politics ===
The early Community leaders of the village since 1952 who had greatly contributed towards the development of Serdang New Village were Mr Hee Kon Swee, JP, PPN and Mr Chow Pak Fah, PJK, PPM. Various Government dignitaries were invited by them to assist in improving the conditions and developing the infrastructure of the village. In 1964, the first Prime Minister, Tunku Abdul Rahman visited the village to have the first hand knowledge about the village. This was followed by Assistant Education Minister, Mr Lee Siok Yew. On 12 November 1968, Deputy Prime Minister Tun Abdul Razak came to open ceremony of the Serdang New Village Secondary School. In 1969, Deputy Prime Minister, Tun Abdul Razak came again for the groundbreaking of Serdang New Village Clinic. On 10 March 1972, Minister of Health, Mr Lee Siok Yew and Minister of Finance, Tun Tan Siew Sin visited the village. The village also saw the visit of the Chief Minister of Selangor, Dato Harun Idris. These two pioneers Mr Hee and Mr Chow never thought their efforts in improving the lives of the village residents would one day turn this backwater village to become a bustling city today.

At the national level, Seri Kembangan is part of the Puchong parliamentary constituency, currently represented by Yeo Bee Yin from DAP. Meanwhile, Seri Kembangan forms its own constituency in the Selangor State Legislative Assembly. The incumbent assemblyperson is Wong Siew Ki, also from DAP. Earlier in 1959 till 1964, it was known as Damansara Constituency before it was called Serdang and later Puchong Constituency. The first MP was Karam Singh Veriah from Socialist Front and won the Damansara Constituency twice.

== Demographics ==
As of 2020, Seri Kembangan has a population of 130,252 residents. Close to 60% of the population are Chinese followed by Malays at 21%, Indians at 6% and others at 1%.

Chinese	57.02%
Malay	21.26%
Other Bumiputeras	0.41%
Indians	6.19%
Others	1.12%
Non-Malaysians	14.0%

== Leisure ==
=== Shopping ===
The Mines Shopping Mall

Seri Kembangan has three major malls: the aforementioned The Mines Shopping Mall, an AEON store in Taman Equine, Giant Hypermarket, and South City Plaza.

=== Food ===
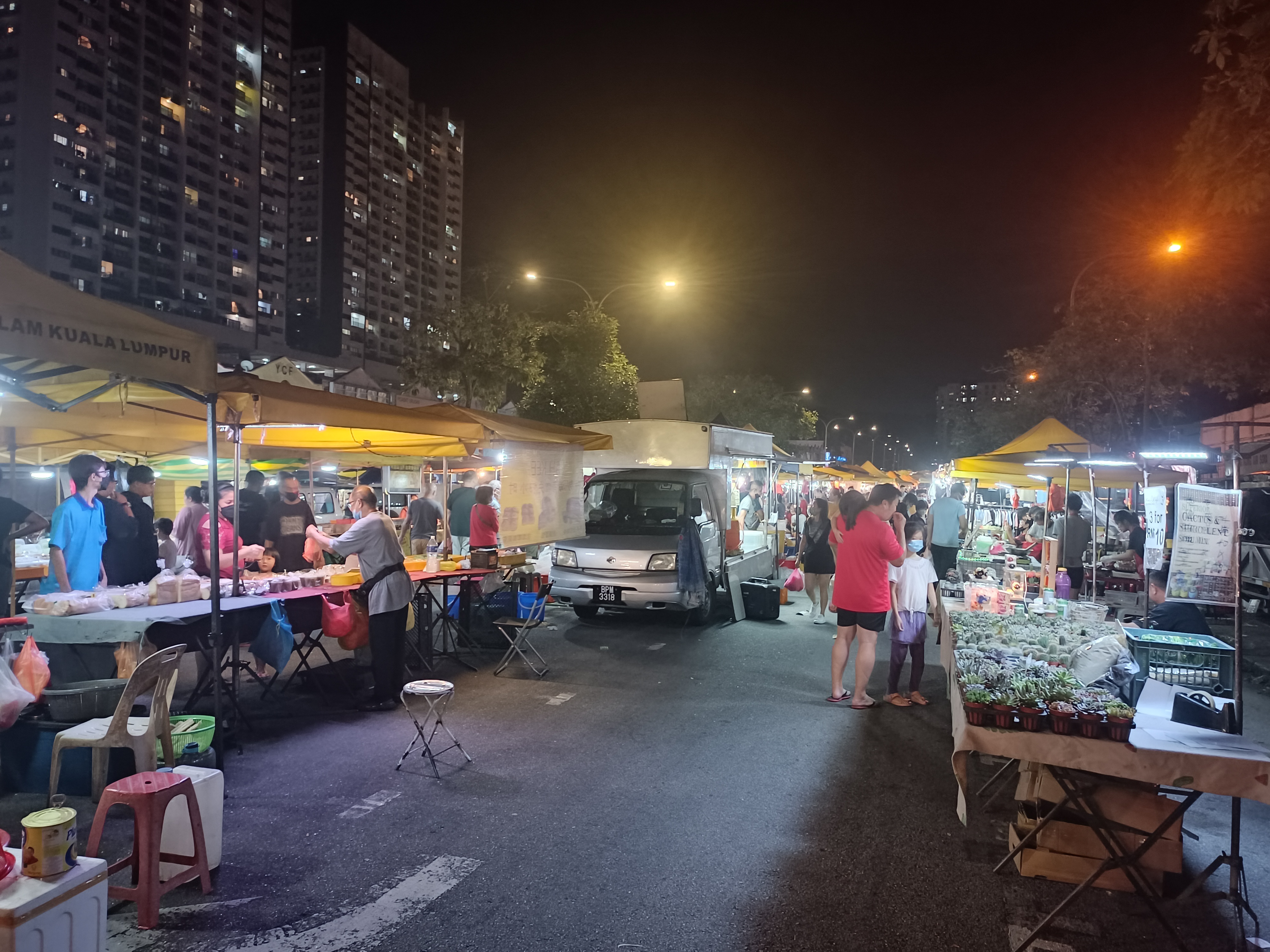
night market

Seri Kembangan is known for its varied street food, incorporating Chinese, Malay, Indian and other races' influences into its literal melting pot. The places to savour street cuisine include Seri Kembangan Night Market and Seri Serdang Night Market (opens every Monday and Friday nights). The more prominent local dishes include nasi lemak, asam laksa, char kway teow, curry noodle, mamak fried mee, rojak and cendol.

=== Tourism ===
Seri Kembangan is home to the Mines Wellness City, a healthcare-oriented resort city. There used to be a theme park known as Mines Wonderland, which operated between 1997 and 2011.

== Transportation ==
=== Car ===
Seri Kembangan is located at the intersection of three tolled highways - the North–South Expressway Southern Route, the Sungai Besi Expressway and the East–West Link Expressway.. The Damansara–Puchong Expressway, the Maju Expressway and the South Klang Valley Expressway run near the western fringe of this township. The interchange between Shah Alam Expressway, Kajang Dispersal Link Expressway, Sungai Besi–Ulu Klang Elevated Expressway, MRR2 and Federal Route 28 lies nearby.

Consequently, Seri Kembangan is regarded as the southern gateway into Kuala Lumpur for motorists travelling from southern Selangor, Negeri Sembilan, Malacca or Johor.

=== Public transportation ===
The main rail station serving Seri Kembangan is KTM Serdang, part of the KTM Komuter network operated by state railway operator KTMB.

The MRT Putrajaya line Phase 2 project that was completed and opened on March 16, 2023, features six stations that are located in Seri Kembangan which are Serdang Raya Utara, Serdang Raya Selatan, Serdang Jaya, UPM, Taman Equine and Putra Permai.

Alternately there is the Sungai Besi MRT station which is about 4 km north.

== Education ==
- Universiti Putra Malaysia
- PORTMAN College
- SK Taman Universiti
- SK Seri Serdang
- SK Serdang
- SK Desaminium
- SK Taman Sungai Besi Indah
- Sekolah Menengah Universal Hua Xia
- S.J.K.(C) Bukit Serdang
- S.J.K.(C) Serdang Baru 1
- S.J.K.(C) Serdang Baru 2
- S.J.K.(C) Kung Man
- S.J.K.(T) Serdang
- SMK Seri Serdang
- SMK Seri Indah
- SMK Seri Kembangan
- SMK Desaminium
- SMK Bandar Puncak Jalil
- Hua Xia International School
- Kingsgate International School
- Alice Smith School, Secondary Campus (International & Private School)
- Australian International School Malaysia - located in MINES Resort City.
- Rafflesia International & Private School

== Notable people ==
- Aidil Aziz (born 1987), actor
