= Mines Wellness City =

Township in Selangor, Malaysia

- Integrated Health and Wellness resort township
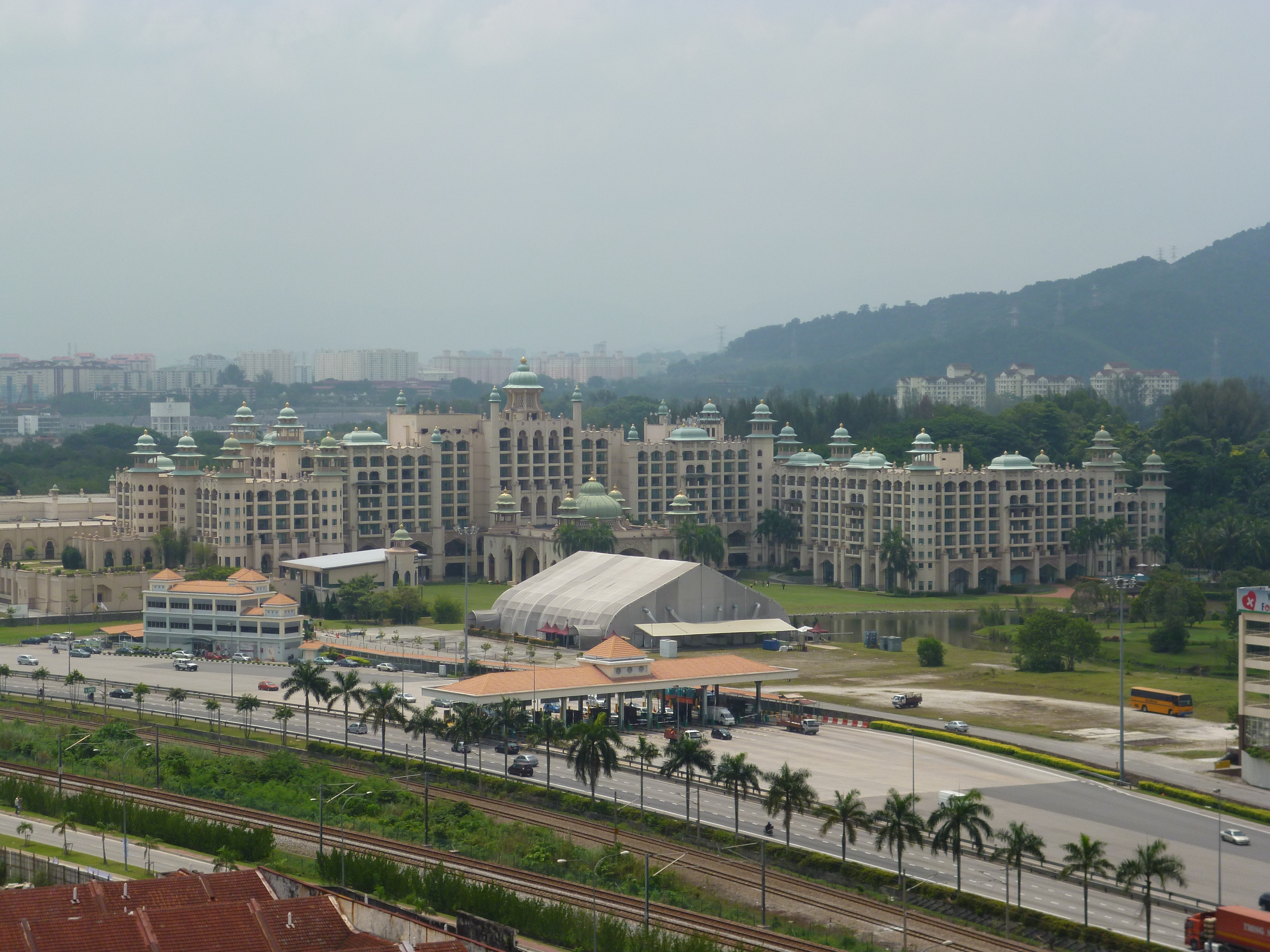
- Palace of the Golden Horse, a five star luxury hotel at Mines Wellness City, Seri Kembangan
- Interactive map of Mines Wellness City
- Coordinates: 3°02′24″N 101°43′00″E
- Country: Malaysia
- State: Selangor
- District: Seri Kembangan
- Established: 1988
- Founder: Country Heights Holdings Bhd
- Website: Mines Wellness City Official website

Mines Wellness City, formerly known as Mines Resort City, is an integrated Health and Wellness resort township in Seri Kembangan, Selangor, Malaysia.

== Background ==
The land was formerly the world's largest open cast tin mine. Currently the development consists of:

- Palace of the Golden Horses - a five-star luxury hotel;
- Mines Beach Resort Hotel & Wellness - healthcare-oriented hotel;
- The Australian International School Malaysia (AISM);
- Golden Horses Health Sanctuary;
- The Mines Shopping Mall;
- Mines Waterfront Business Park;
- Mines Resort & Golf Club;
- Mines International Exhibition Convention Centre (MIECC); and
- The Heritage Residences and Retail
- Philea

It is both an expansion and transformation of the former Mines Resort City. The expansion of the city is part of the government's Economic Transformation Plan (ETP) which is spearheaded by PEMANDU (Performance Management and Delivery Unit), under the Prime Minister's Department.

It was announced on 11 January 2011 by the prime minister of Malaysia Datuk Seri Najib Tun Razak.

== History ==
The current Mines Wellness City was formerly the site of the Hong Fatt Mine, which was the largest opencast tin mine in the world, covering 1,300 acres (530 ha), including the lakes. The Malaysian Government alienated the land to Country Heights Holdings Bhd (CHHB) on 30 March 1988 for recreational and tourism purposes. Country Heights Holdings Berhad is founded by Y.Bhg. Tan Sri Dato' Paduka Lee Kim Yew and incorporated officially on 10 May 1984 under a private limited company with the name of Kurniata Sdn Bhd.

== Facilities ==
In order to complement the tourism theme, a five-star hotel, the Palace of the Golden Horses with a distinctive architectural design and Mines Wellness Hotel (formerly known as The Mines Beach Resort and Spa) with a man-made beach and swimming lagoon were built. A leading Health Screening Centre and Traditional Chinese Medicine Centre was also located in Mines Wellness City.

Other components of development completed to date within the Mines Wellness City are the Tronoh Mines shopping mall and a former theme park named Mines Wonderland (operated between 1997 and 2011). In March 2010, CapitaMalls Asia has re-branded Mines Shopping Fair to a contemporary neighborhood shopping mall with a major upgrading work, including additional retail space, revamping the carpark system, changing new wash rooms, creating additional link bridges and new sets of escalators inside the mall.

=== Economic Transformation Programme ===
The transformation of Mines Wellness City into the nation's very first Wellness City is part of the government's Economic Transformation Plan (ETP) which is spearheaded by PEMANDU (Performance Management and Delivery Unit), under the Prime Minister’s Department. By the year 2020, the City is envisioned to be a RM 5.5 billion development, playing a central role in tourism and becoming the foremost wellness destination in the country.

== Access ==
=== Public transport ===
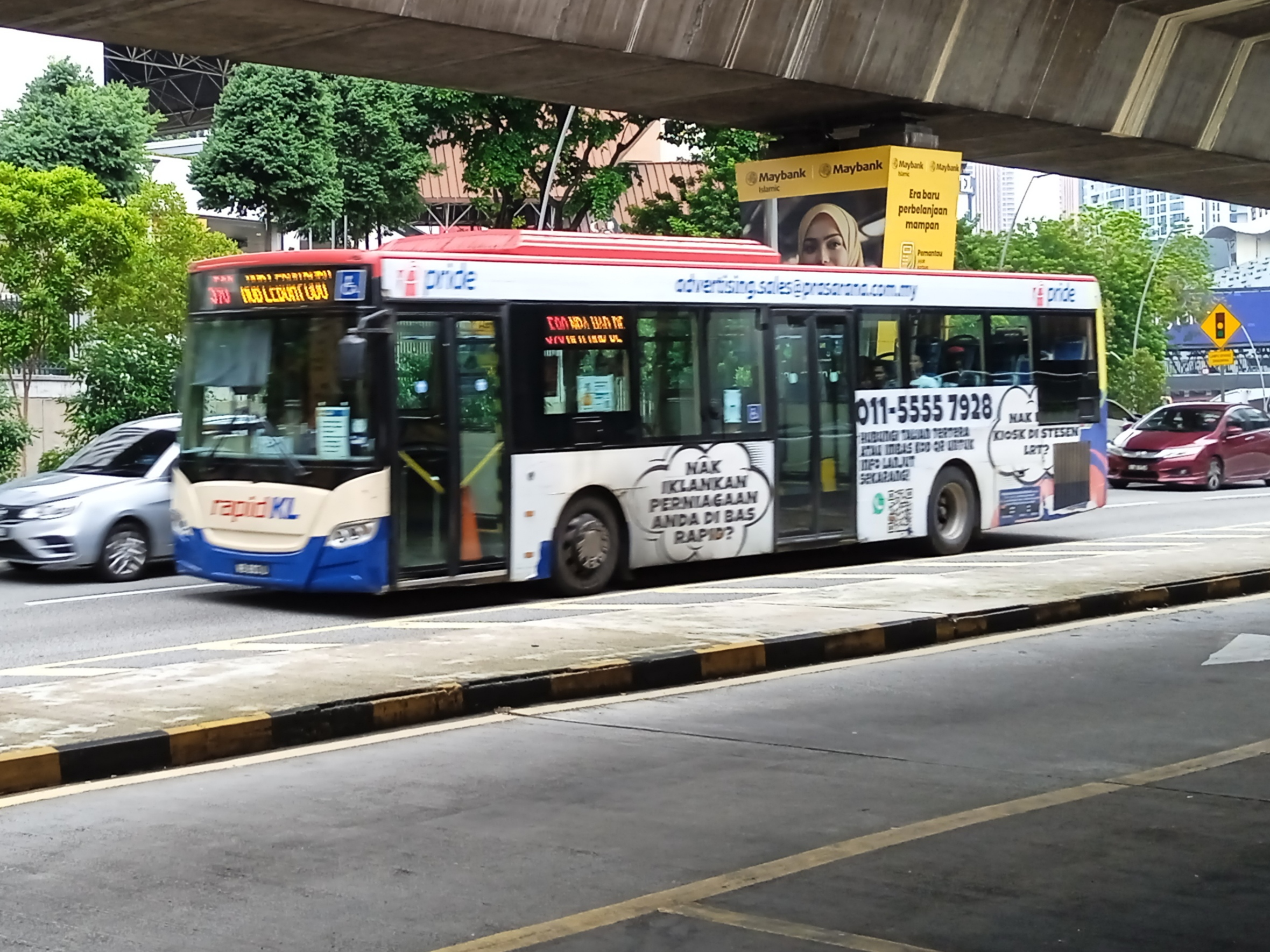
Rapid KL bus route 590 at Lebuh Pudu bus hub, 2023.

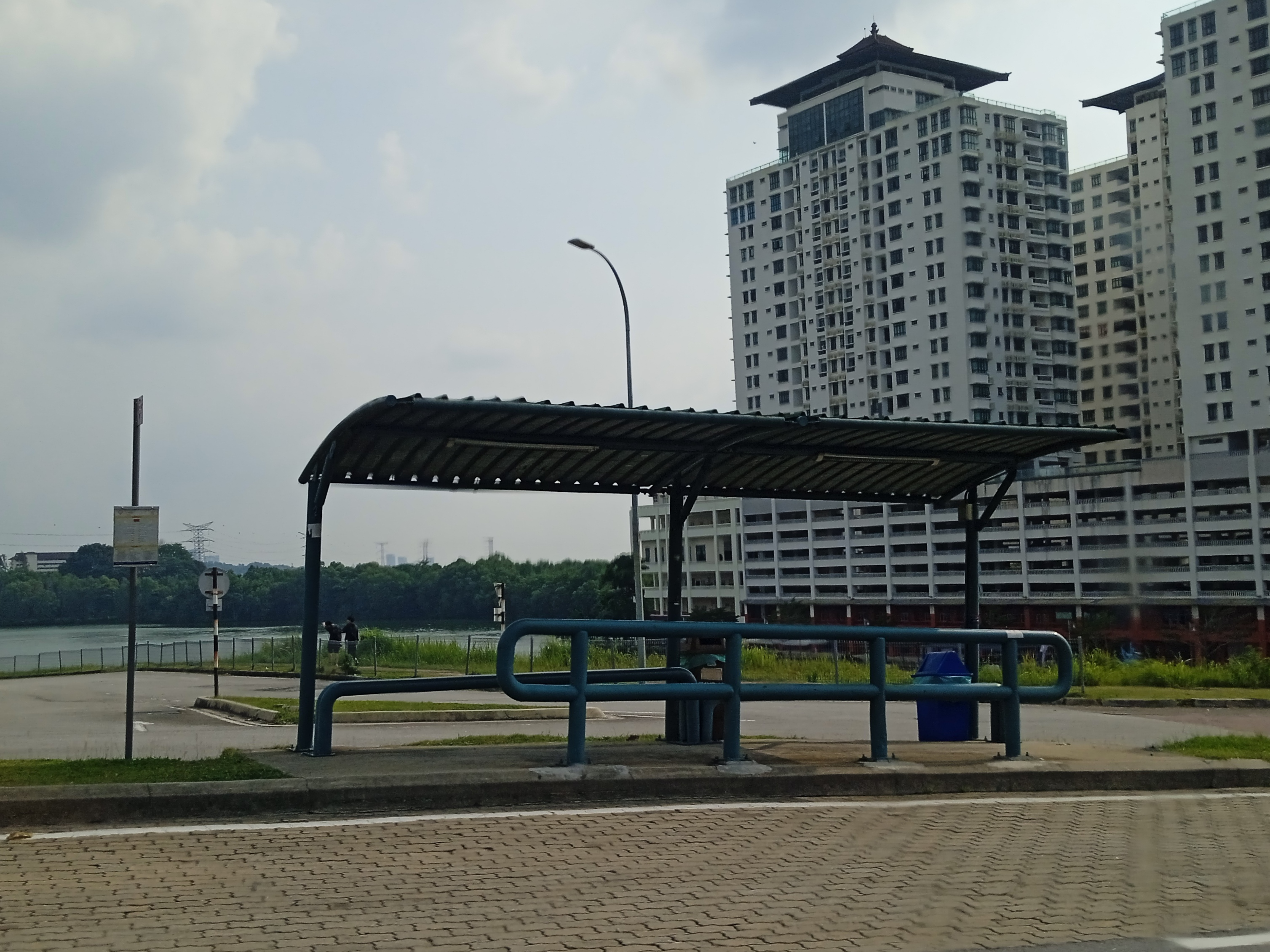
The Mines (Opp) bus stop (SJ598), 2023.

KTM Serdang is the nearest railway station. Although it is possible to pedestrian walk from the station via the overhead bridge of the expressway to the majority areas such as Tronoh Mines mall via 10 minute walk, some of the areas like Palace of Golden Horses are still require to use own transport to go there. The KLIA Express tracks also run near here, parallel to the KTM tracks, but does not stop here.

Mines Wellness City accessible by Rapid KL trunk bus route 590 from Lebuh Pudu bus hub at Jalan Tun Tan Siew Sin, Kuala Lumpur via Jalan Chan Sow Lin, Sungai Besi Expressway, Kajang Dispersal Link Expressway, Jalan Sungai Long and end at Hab UTAR near Universiti Tunku Abdul Rahman (UTAR) Sungai Long Campus building. This area also served by Rapid KL MRT feeder bus (Bas Perantara MRT) route T565 from Serdang Jaya MRT station to Taman Sungai Besi Indah via Mines Wellness City and T569 from Serdang Jaya MRT station to Batu 11 Cheras MRT station via Mines Wellness City. Bus route T569 was introduced on 25 September 2023. Bus route T571 from Serdang railway station to Taman Sri Pulai also serve Mines Wellness City area. The Mines bus stop (SJ640) and The Mines (Opp) bus stop (SJ598) serves Rapid KL bus route 590, T565, T569 and T571.

=== Car ===
Besraya Expressway is the most direct route into Tronoh Mines. BESRAYA interchanges into SILK at the southern boundary of the project.

Tronoh Mines sits next to the southern gateway into Kuala Lumpur from Negeri Sembilan, Malacca or Johor for motorists coming from PLUS.

== Gallery ==
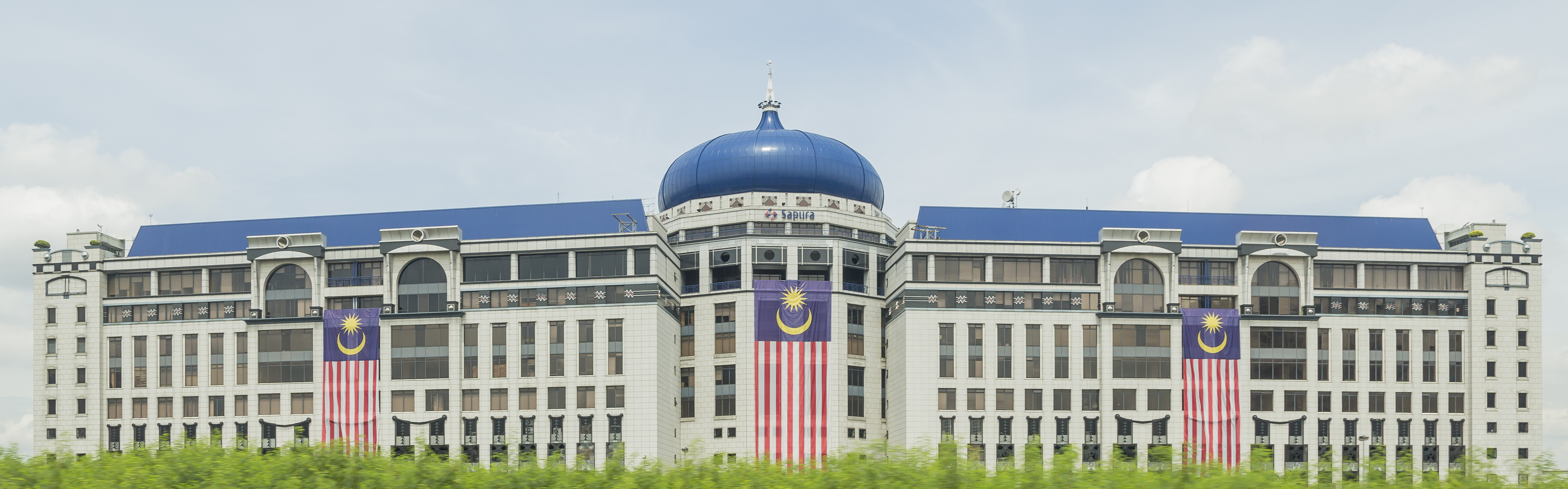
Sapura Building beside The Mines Lakes

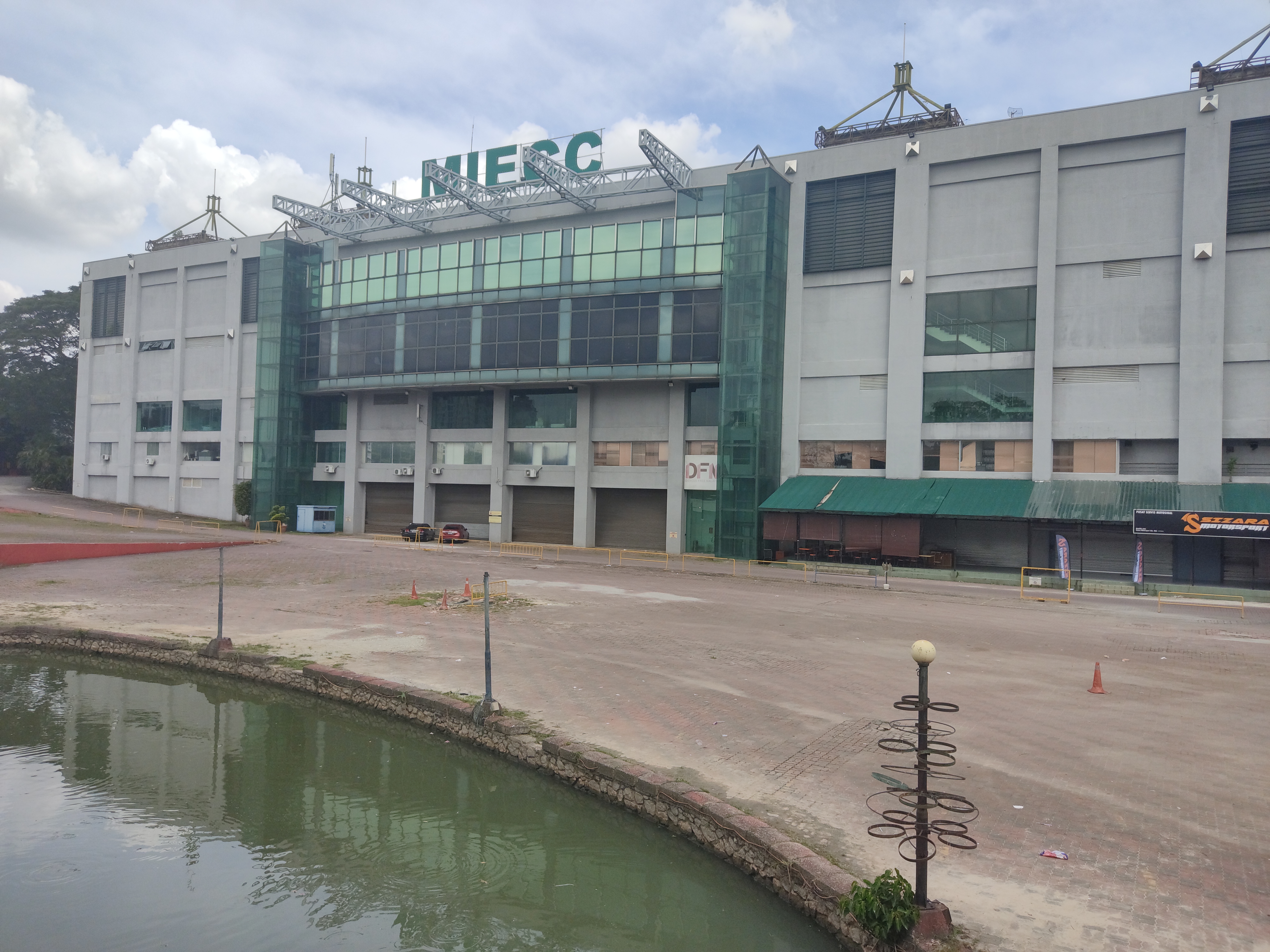
The MINES International Exhibition & Convention Centre

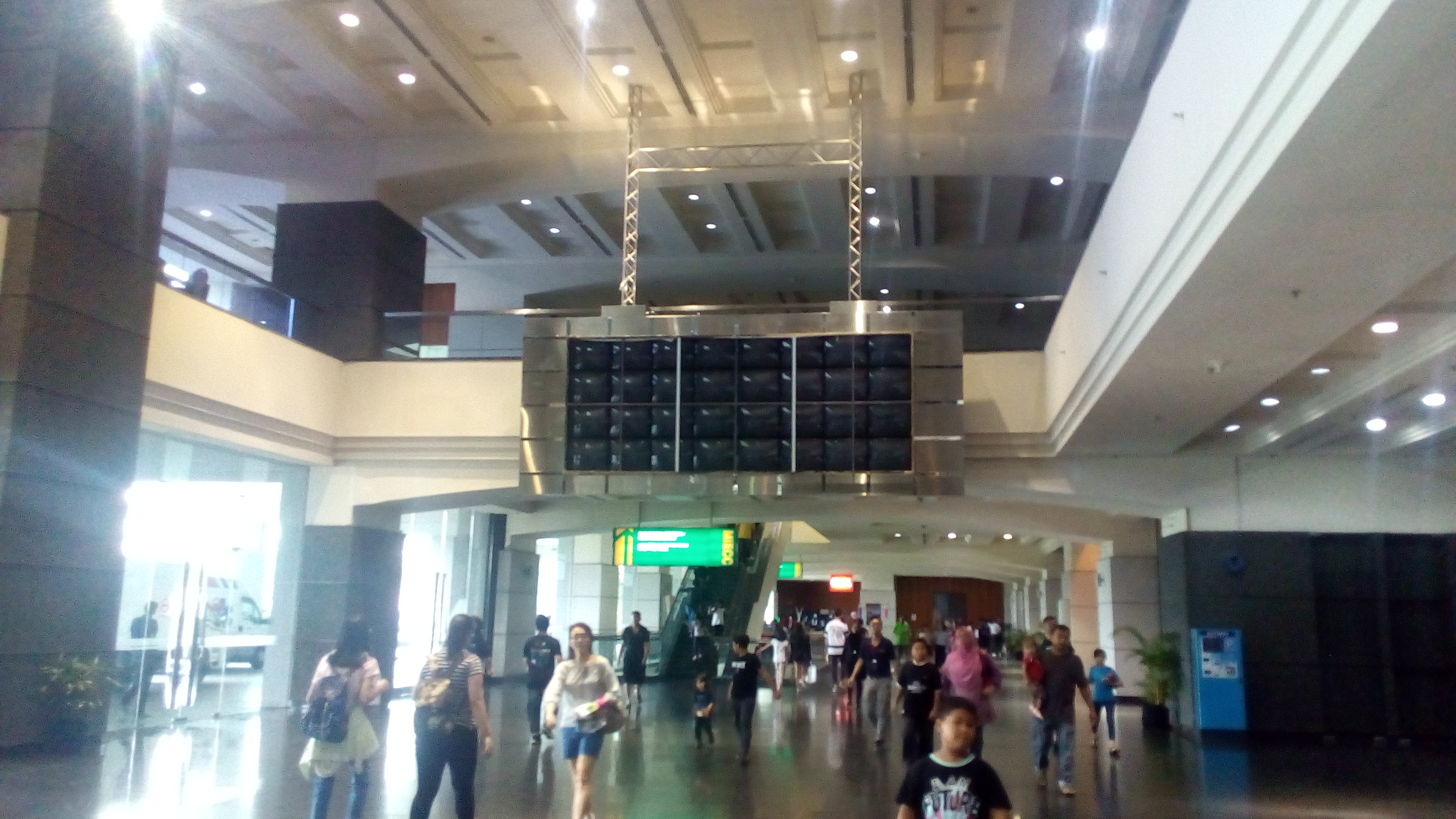
Interior of MIECC

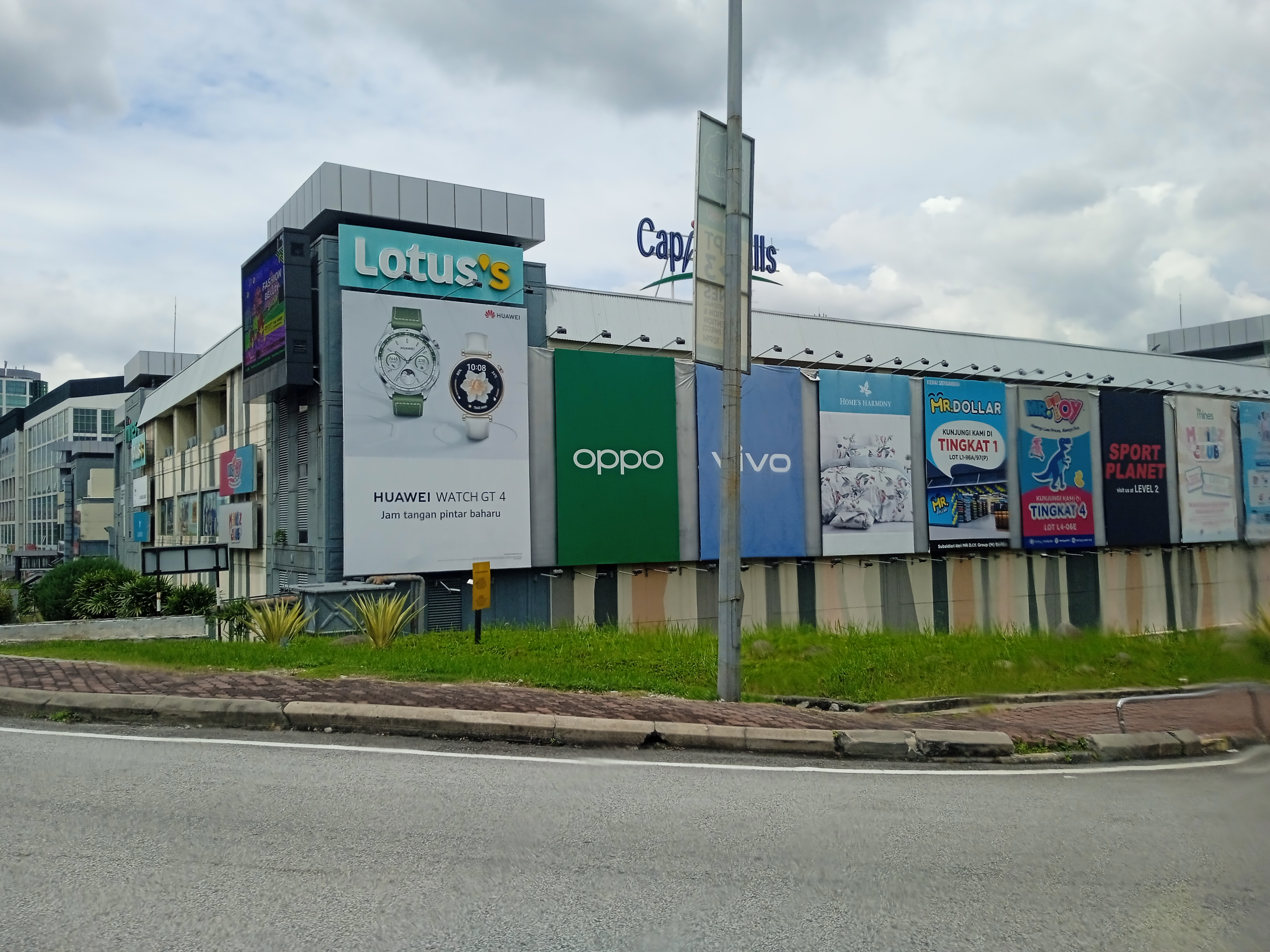
The Mines

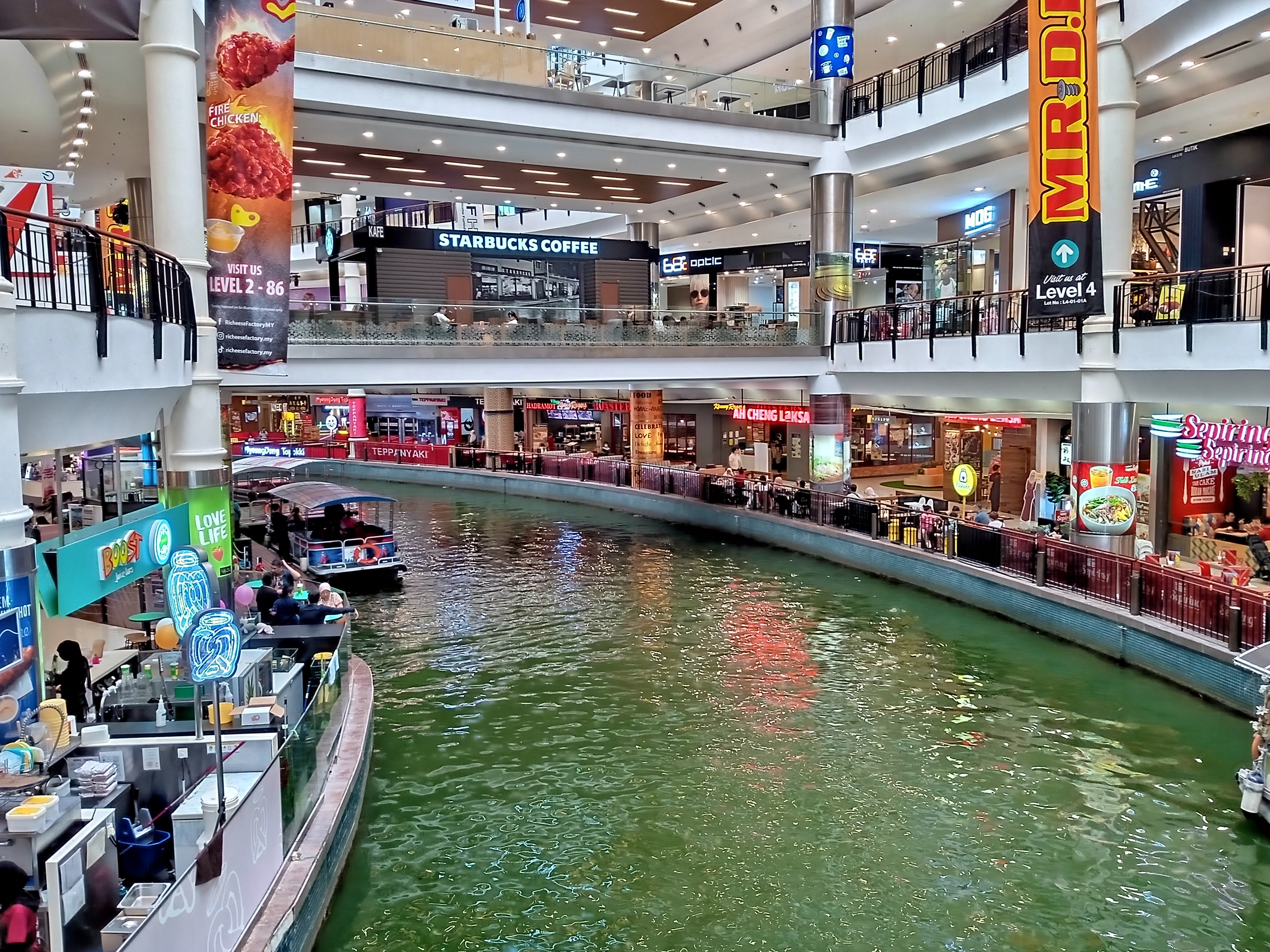
Interior of The Mines

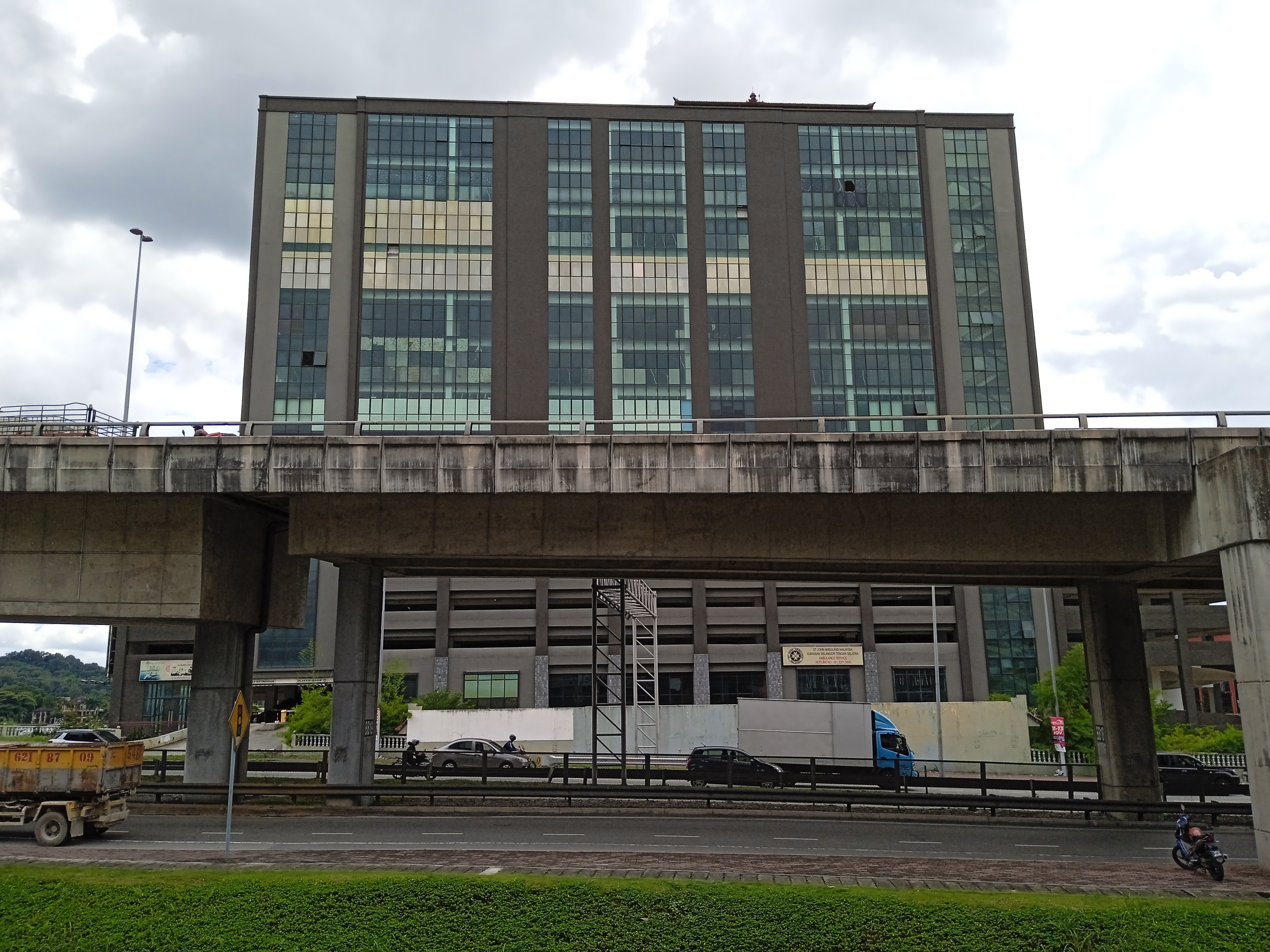
Heritage Residence, 2023

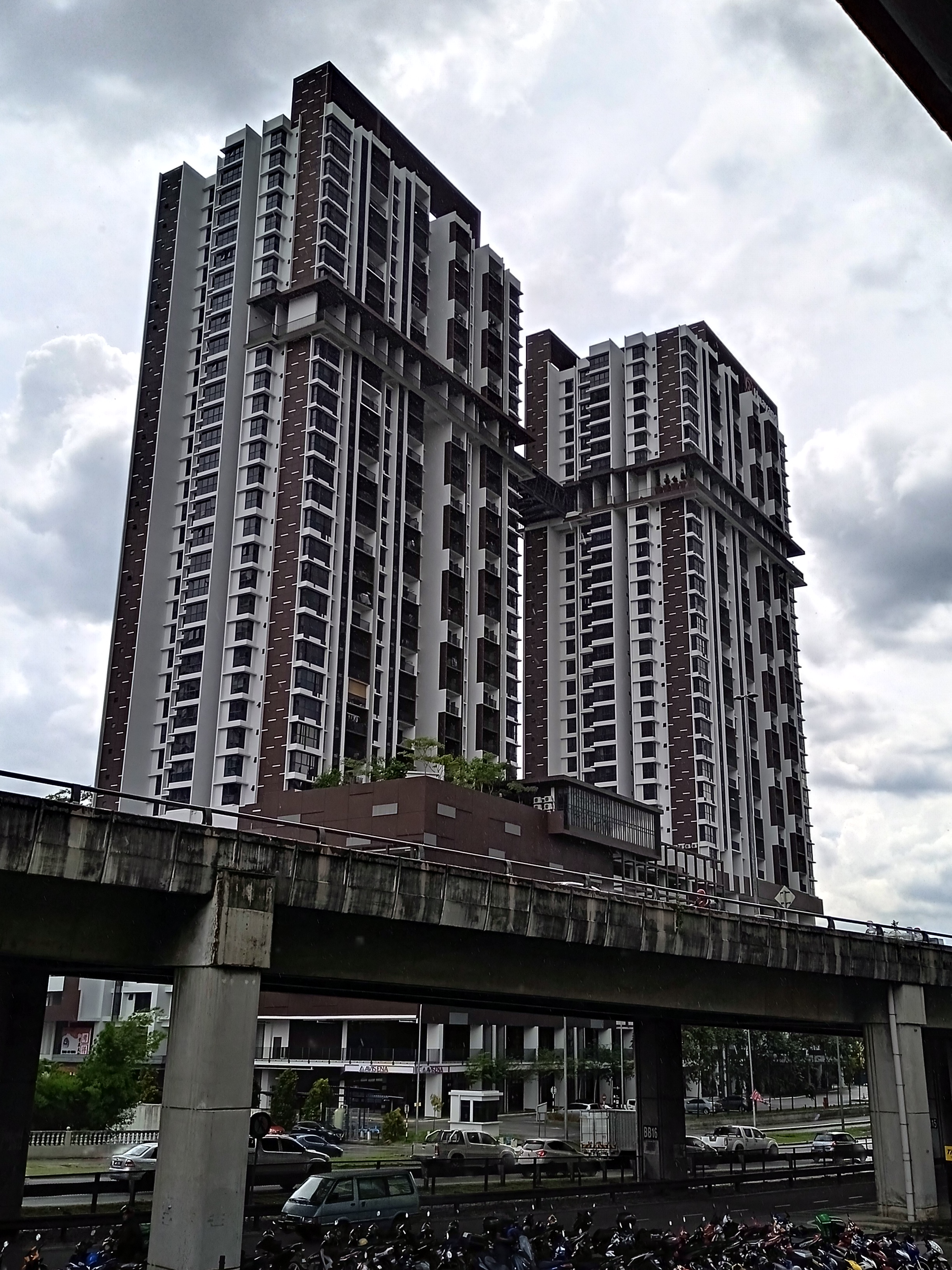
Residensi Estetika, 2023
