= Serdang Raya Selatan MRT station =

Metro station in Selangor, Malaysia

PY32 Serdang Raya Selatan

General information
- Other names: Malay: سردڠ راي سلاتن (Jawi); Chinese: 沙登拉也南; Tamil: செர்டாங் ராயா செலாத்தான்
- Location: Jalan Utama, Taman Serdang Raya, 43300 Seri Kembangan; Malaysia
- Coordinates: 3.0284°N 101.7074°E
- System: Rapid KL
- Owner: MRT Corp
- Operator: Rapid Rail
- Line: 12 Putrajaya Line
- Platforms: 1 island platform
- Tracks: 2

Construction
- Parking: Available
- Accessible: Yes

Other information
- Status: Operational
- Station code: PY32

History
- Opened: 16 March 2023; 3 years ago

Services
Preceding station		Following station
Serdang Raya Utara towards Kwasa Damansara	Putrajaya Line	Serdang Jaya towards Putrajaya Sentral
Location

The Serdang Raya Selatan MRT station is a mass rapid transit (MRT) station serving the suburbs of Taman Serdang Raya and Taman Serdang Perdana in Seri Kembangan, Selangor, Malaysia. It is one of the stations that was built as part of the Klang Valley Mass Rapid Transit (KVMRT) project on the MRT Putrajaya Line.

== Location ==
The station was built near the site of Vision Home Expo, along the North–South Expressway Southern Route. The station is within walking distance of Seri Kembangan New Village, via a bridge over the Kuyoh River.

Rainbow bridge across the Kuyoh River

== Bus Services ==
=== Discontinued lines ===
T564 was part of the 19 bus routes in the Klang Valley that were discontinued and replaced by Rapid KL on-Demand routes on 16 January 2026. Low ridership was cited as a reason for the line's termination.

Route No.	Origin	Desitination	Via	Connected to	Terminated
T564	PY32 Serdang Raya Selatan (Gate A)	Seri Kembangan New Village	Jalan Utama; Jalan SB 2/2; Jalan Pasar; Jalan Aman; Jalan SK 6/1; Jalan Besar	540, SJ04, SJ05	January 16, 2026
