= Twentyfive.7 =

Township in Selangor, Malaysia

Twentyfive.7 Gamuda Kemuning 25.7
- Township
- Twentyfive7
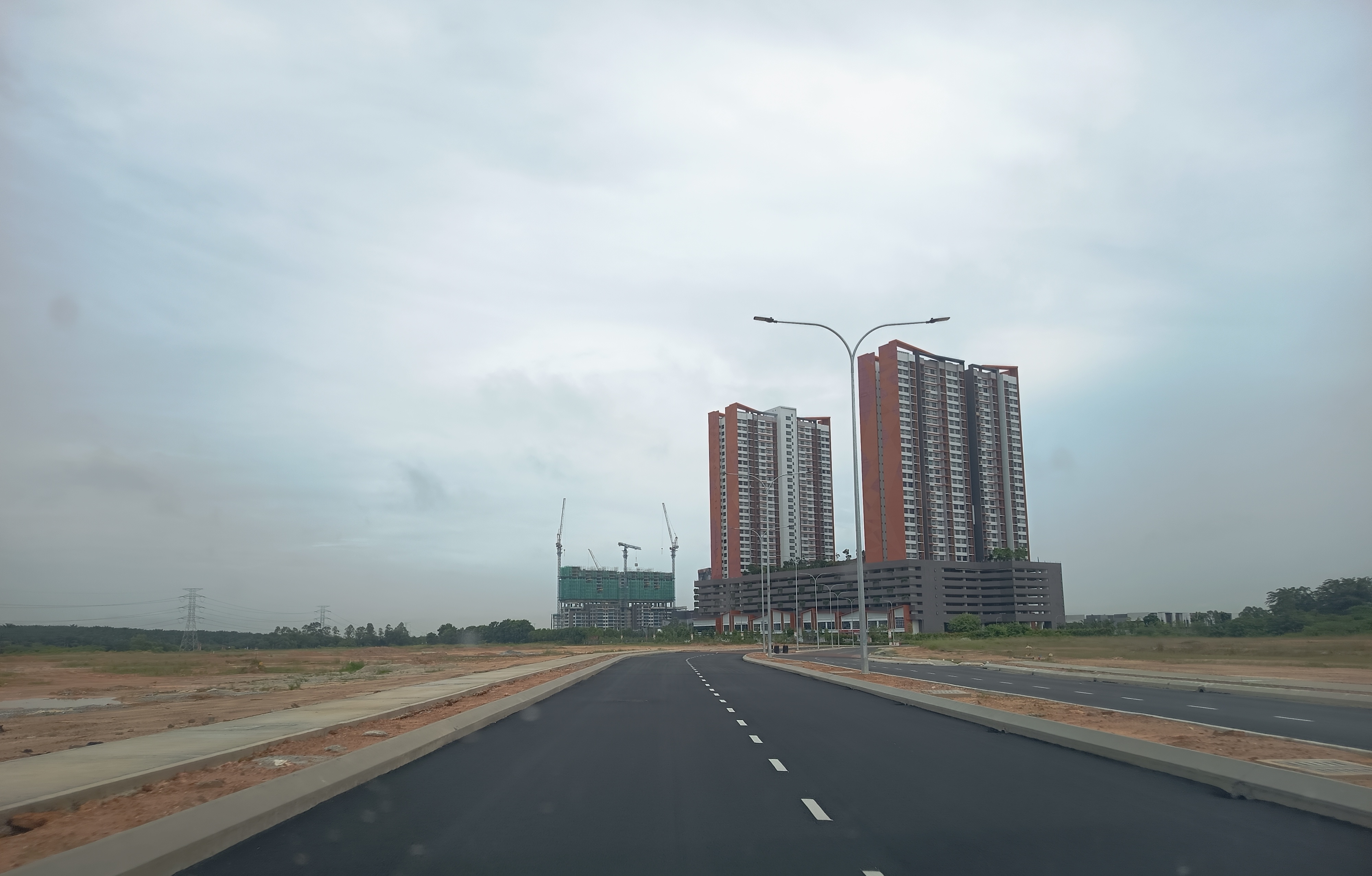
- Twentyfive.7 from Bandar Rimbayu

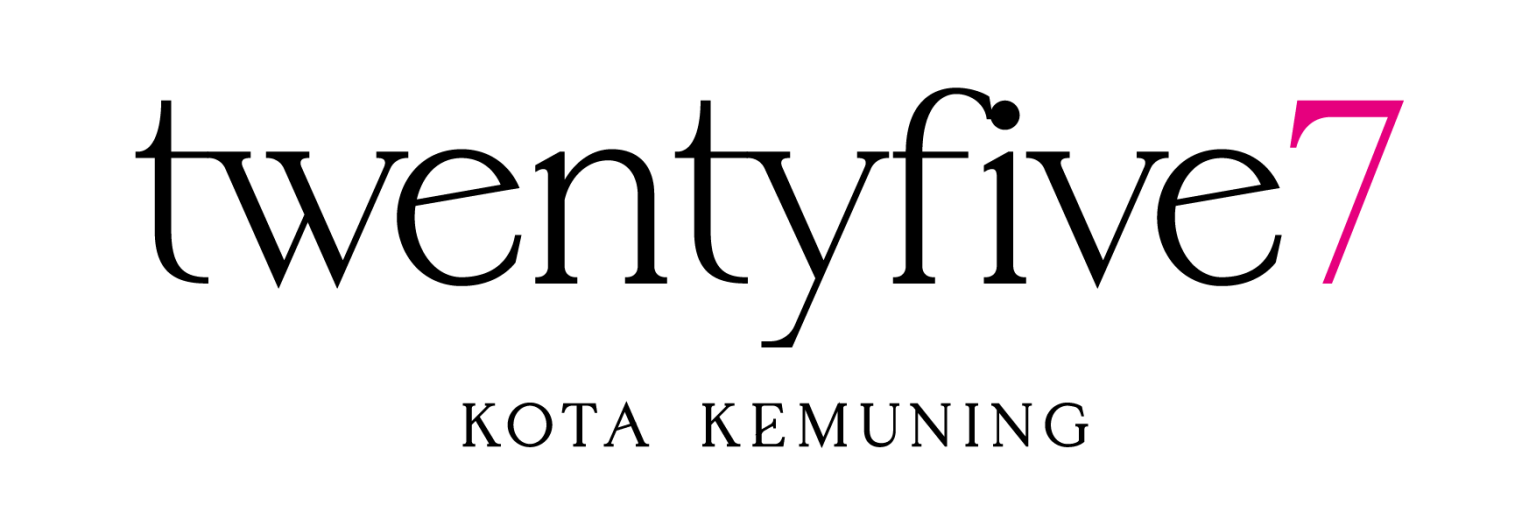
- Logo
- Interactive map of Twentyfive.7
- Coordinates: 2°57′21.6″N 101°33′03.3″E
- Country: Malaysia
- State: Selangor
- District: Kuala Langat
- Mukim: Tanjong Duabelas
- Launched: 2017
- Founder: Gamuda Land

Government
  - Local government: Kuala Langat Municipal Council

Area
  - Total: 104 ha (257 acres)
- Time zone: UTC+8 (MST)
  - Summer (DST): Not observed
- Postcode: 42500
- Website: Official website

Twentyfive.7, officially Twentyfive7 (stylized with a lowercase "T"; also known as Gamuda Kemuning 25.7) is a 257 acres (104 ha) township located in the Kuala Langat district, Selangor, Malaysia. The township was launched in 2017 by Gamuda Land.

The postcode used in Twentyfive.7 is 42500 Telok Panglima Garang.

== Administration ==
Twentyfive.7 is located within Mukim Tanjong Duabelas, which is one of the seven mukims in the Kuala Langat district. Apart from that, Twentyfive.7 is located under the administration of the Kuala Langat Municipal Council (MPKL), where it is in the 7th Zones of MPKL.

== Features ==
Twentyfive.7 has a 330,000 sq ft (7.6 acres) shopping mall, namely Quayside Mall. It was opened to the public on 19 December 2020.

Other than that, Twentyfive.7 has a central park that is located next to the mall. The central park has an area of 7 acres (2.8 ha).

== Transport ==
=== Expressways/Highways ===
Twentyfive.7 is accessible through these 5 main expressways/highways.

- North–South Expressway Central Link (ELITE)
- South Klang Valley Expressway (SKVE)
- Shah Alam Expressway (KESAS)
- Kemuning–Shah Alam Highway (LKSA)
- West Coast Expressway (WCE)

=== Public transportation ===
SP31 KJ37 Putra Heights LRT station is the closest rail station to Twentyfive.7 by distance via North–South Expressway Central Link (ELITE).
