= Taman Desa Kemandol =

Human settlement in Selangor, Malaysia

Taman Desa Kemandol Desa Kemandol, Kampung Orang Asli Bukit Kemandul
- Temuan Orang Asli neighbourhood
- Taman Desa Kemandol from South Klang Valley Expressway
- Interactive map of Taman Desa Kemandol
- Coordinates: 2°56′19.0″N 101°33′51.0″E
- Country: Malaysia
- State: Selangor
- District: Kuala Langat
- Mukim: Tanjong Duabelas
- Parliamentary area: Kuala Langat
- State area: Sijangkang

Government
  - Local government: Kuala Langat Municipal Council
  - Tok Batin: Kelat Budin

Area
  - Total: 47.39 ha (117.1 acres)

Population (mid-2023)
  - Total: 923
  - Sex percentage: 52.1% male 47.9% female
- Time zone: UTC+8 (MST)
  - Summer (DST): Not observed
- Postcode: 42610

Taman Desa Kemandol (also known as Desa Kemandol or Kampung Orang Asli Bukit Kemandul) is a neighbourhood of the Temuan Orang Asli located in the Kuala Langat district, Selangor, Malaysia. Its population was 923 people in mid-2023.

The postcode used in the neighbourhood is 42610 Jenjarom. Another place that uses the postcode is Bandar Saujana Putra.

== Administration ==
Taman Desa Kemandol is located within Mukim Tanjong Duabelas, which is one of the seven mukims in the Kuala Langat district. Apart from that, Taman Desa Kemandol is located under the administration of the Kuala Langat Municipal Council (MPKL), where it is in the 7th Zones of MPKL.

Politically, Taman Desa Kemandol is located in the Sijangkang state area, which is one of the three state areas within the parliamentary constituency of Kuala Langat.

The current Tok Batin (headman) for Taman Desa Kemandol is Kelat Budin.

== Geography ==
Taman Desa Kemandol is a human settlement located in a rural area. The settlement pattern observed in Taman Desa Kemandol is a nucleated settlement.

The neighbourhood has an area of 47.39 ha (117.1 acres).

There is a retention pond in Taman Desa Kemandol which is managed by the Kuala Langat Department of Irrigation and Drainage. Fishing activities are carried out at the pond by the residents of this neighbourhood.

== Demographic ==
=== Ethnicity ===
The Temuan ethnicity makes up the majority of the neighbourhood's population.

=== Religion ===
Residents of the neighbourhood are followers of Islam and traditional beliefs.

=== Population ===
In mid-2023, a total of 923 people lived in Taman Desa Kemandol. Males constitute 52.1% of the population and females 47.9%.

== Amenities ==
Taman Desa Kemandol has one primary school, namely Sekolah Kebangsaan Bukit Kemandol. There is also an Al-Quran and Fardhu Ain Integration Class (KAFAI) in the neighbourhood.

In addition, it also has a community hall located next to the primary school. KAFAI that been said is to be located right next to the community hall.

Other than that, there is a surau in the neighbourhood, namely Surau Al-Hidayah. Next to Surau Al-Hidayah, there is a Muslim cemetery.
