= UPM MRT station =

Metro station in Selangor, Malaysia

PY34 UPM

General information
- Other names: Malay: اونيۏرسيتي ڤوترا مليسيا (Jawi); Chinese: 马来西亚博特拉大学; Tamil: மலேசிய புத்ரா பல்கலைக்கழகம்
- Location: Universiti Putra Malaysia (UPM), 43400 Seri Kembangan; Selangor; Malaysia
- System: Rapid KL
- Owner: MRT Corp
- Operator: Rapid Rail
- Line: 12 Putrajaya Line
- Platforms: 1 island platform
- Tracks: 2

Construction
- Parking: Available
- Accessible: Yes

Other information
- Status: Operational
- Station code: PY34

History
- Opened: 16 March 2023; 3 years ago

Services
Preceding station		Following station
Serdang Jaya towards Kwasa Damansara	Putrajaya Line	Taman Equine towards Putrajaya Sentral
Location

The UPM MRT station is a mass rapid transit (MRT) station at Universiti Putra Malaysia (UPM) in Seri Kembangan, Selangor, Malaysia. It is one of the stations on the MRT Putrajaya Line.

== Location ==
The station is located near UPM's Agriculture Field 2 (Ladang 2) of the Faculty of Agriculture and the University Housing Complex (UHC), formerly known as International Transit House, all of which are accessible to the UPM main campus within walking distance.

== Nearby places ==
In addition to UPM's main campus, the MRT station also serves the nearby attractions and places of interest within a 5 km radius from the station. The Farm Fresh @ UPM is accessible via MRT feeder bus T568, while the rest of the areas can be reached via Rapid Bus On-Demand demand-responsive transport service from 30 June 2025 (previously operated by Trek Rides - UPM-Serdang area - under Selangor Mobility from February 2024 to June 2025).

- Farm Fresh @ UPM
- Sultan Idris Shah Serdang Hospital
- Malaysian Agricultural Research and Development Institute (MARDI)
- Malaysia Agro Exposition Park Serdang (MAEPS)
- IOI City Mall

== Bus services ==
=== Feeder buses ===
Route no.	Origin	Destination	Via	Connecting to
T566	PY34 UPM (Entrance A)	Taman Bukit Serdang; Taman Universiti Indah	Jalan Seri Kembangan; Jalan Indah 1 Jalan BS 3/1; Jalan BS 5/37; Jalan Bersatu; Jalan BS 5/3; Jalan BS 5/26	540, SJ05
T567	PY34 UPM (Entrance A)	Taman Sri Serdang; Faculty of Engineering, Universiti Putra Malaysia	Jalan Raya 3 Jalan Raya 2 Persiaran Universiti 2 Jalan 18/45; Jalan Sri Serdang Selatan; Jalan 18/28	SJ04, SJ05
T568	PY34 UPM (Entrance A)	Faculty of Agriculture, Universiti Putra Malaysia	Persiaran Universiti 1 Jalan Satelit; Jalan Maklumat; UPM-MTDC; Farm Fresh @ UPM; Lebuh Silikon; De Centrum Mall; Universiti Tenaga Nasional (UNITEN)	SJ04

=== On-Demand Routes ===
Route No.	Origin	Destination	Via	Booking App
T568B	PY34 UPM (Entrance A)	IOI City Mall	Taman Sri Serdang; Sultan Idris Shah Serdang Hospital; Universiti Putra Malaysia; Malaysia Agro Exposition Park Serdang	Rapid on-Demand

== See also ==
- Universiti LRT station for the University of Malaya (UM)
- UKM Komuter station for the National University of Malaysia (UKM)
- UiTM Shah Alam LRT station for Universiti Teknologi MARA (UiTM) Shah Alam campus
