= Malaysia Federal Route 345 =

Road in Malaysia

Federal Route 345
- Jalan Hospital Serdang

Route information
- Maintained by Malaysian Public Works Department
- Length: 2.8 km (1.7 mi)

Major junctions
- West end: Serdang Hospital (West)-SKVE interchange
- South Klang Valley Expressway
- East end: Serdang Hospital (East)-SKVE interchange

Location
- Country: Malaysia
- Primary destinations: Serdang Hospital, University of Putra Malaysia (UPM)

Highway system
- Highways in Malaysia; Expressways; Federal; State

Federal Route 345, Jalan Hospital Serdang, is an institutional facilities federal road in Selangor, Malaysia. It is a main route to Sultan Idris Shah Serdang Hospital (Serdang Hospital) from the South Klang Valley Expressway (SKVE) and acts as an emergency route to the hospital.

The Kilometre Zero is located at the Serdang Hospital (West)-SKVE interchange.

At most sections, the Federal Route 345 was built under the JKR R5 road standard, with a speed limit of 90 km/h (56 mph).

== Junction lists ==
The entire route is located in Sepang District, Selangor.

Legend:

- I/C - Interchange, I/S - Intersection, RSA - Rest and service area, OBR - Overhead bridge restaurant, R/R - Restaurant and rest plaza, L/B - Layby, V/P - Vista point, TN - tunnel, T/P - Toll plaza, BR - Bridge
- C - Cloverleaf, S - Stack, T-A - Trumpet-A, T-B - Trumpet-B, DT - Directional-T/Y, SDT - Semi-Directional-T/Y, P-Y - Partial-Y, D - Diamond, P-C - Partial cloverleaf, D-D - Diverging diamond, D-R - Direct ramp

Location	km	mi	Exit	Name	Destinations	Notes
Serdang	0.0	0.0	2603	Serdang Hospital (West)-SKVE	South Klang Valley Expressway – Pulau Indah, Banting, Putrajaya, Cyberjaya, Puchong, Shah Alam, Kuala Lumpur International Airport (KLIA)	Interchange with one ramp to SKVE
Serdang				University Veterinary Hospital	University Veterinary Hospital (Hospital Veterinar UPM)	
Serdang				UPM South Gate	University of Putra Malaysia (UPM) (South Gate) – Persiaran MARDI-UPM, Malaysia Agro Exposition Park Serdang (MAEPS)	T-junctions
Serdang				Serdang Hospital	Sultan Idris Shah Serdang Hospital	T-junctions
Serdang	2.8	1.7	2603	Serdang Hospital (East)-SKVE	South Klang Valley Expressway – Kajang, Bangi, Kuala Lumpur, Seremban	Interchange with one ramp from SKVE
1.000 mi = 1.609 km; 1.000 km = 0.621 mi
