= Bandar Tropicana Aman =

Township in Selangor, Malaysia

- Township
- Tropicana Aman

Other transcription(s)
  - Jawi script: باندر تروڤيكنا امان
  - Chinese: 丽阳丰逸城
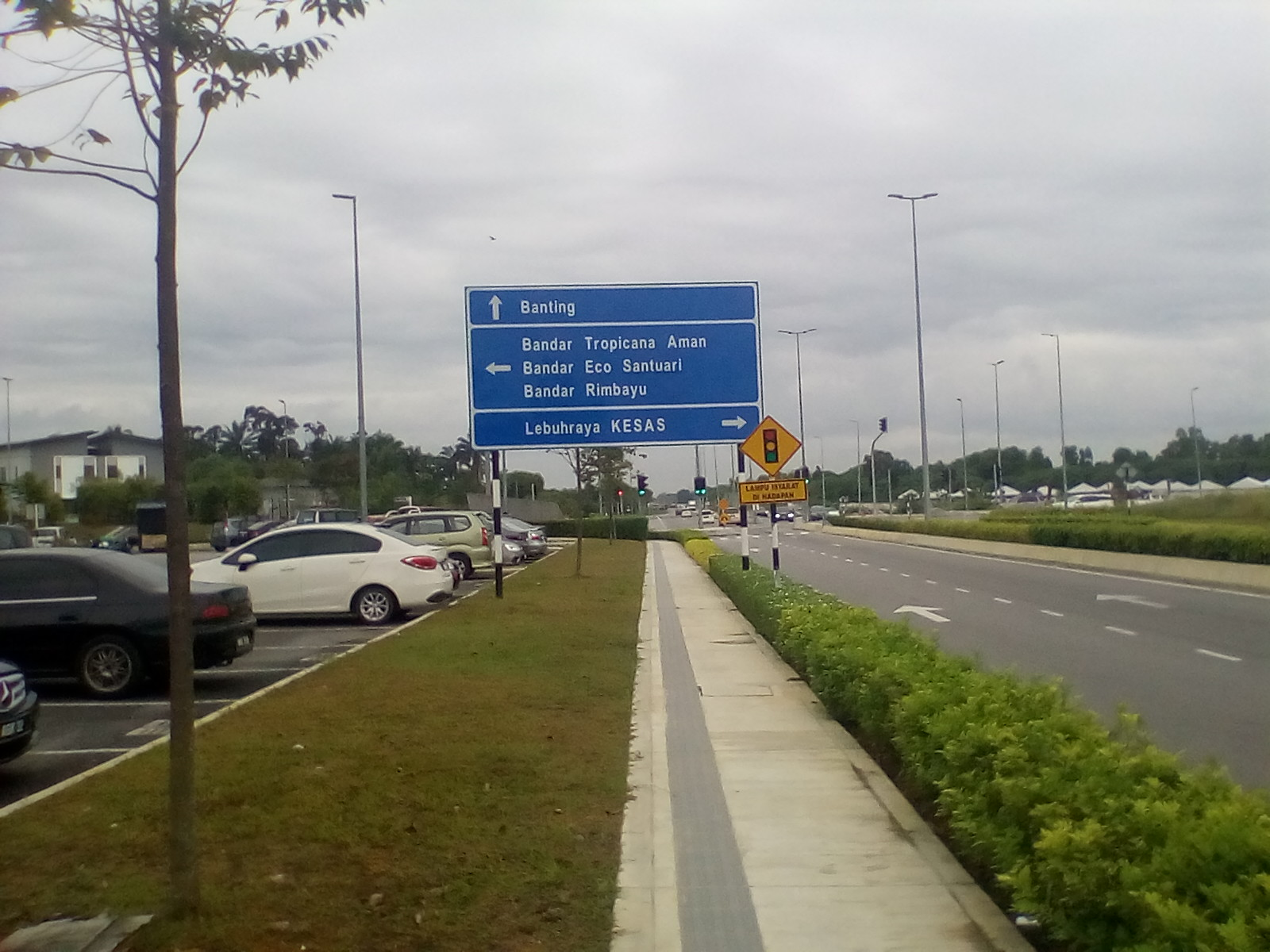
- Bandar Tropicana Aman in 2021

- Logo
- Interactive map of Bandar Tropicana Aman
- Coordinates: 2°56′45.8″N 101°31′34.1″E
- Country: Malaysia
- State: Selangor
- District: Kuala Langat
- Mukim: Tanjong Duabelas
- Launched: May 2015
- Founder: Tropicana Corporation Berhad

Government
  - Local government: Kuala Langat Municipal Council

Area
  - Total: 349 ha (863 acres)
- Time zone: UTC+8 (MST)
  - Summer (DST): Not observed
- Postcode: 42500
- Website: Official website

Bandar Tropicana Aman, or simply Tropicana Aman is a 863 acres (349 ha) township located in the Kuala Langat district, Selangor, Malaysia. The township was launched in May 2015 by Tropicana Corporation Berhad.

The postcode used in Bandar Tropicana Aman is 42500 Telok Panglima Garang.

== Administration ==
Bandar Tropicana Aman is located within Mukim Tanjong Duabelas, which is one of the seven mukims in the Kuala Langat district. Apart from that, Bandar Tropicana Aman is located under the administration of the Kuala Langat Municipal Council (MPKL), where it is in the 3rd Zones of MPKL.

== Amenities ==
=== Recreation ===
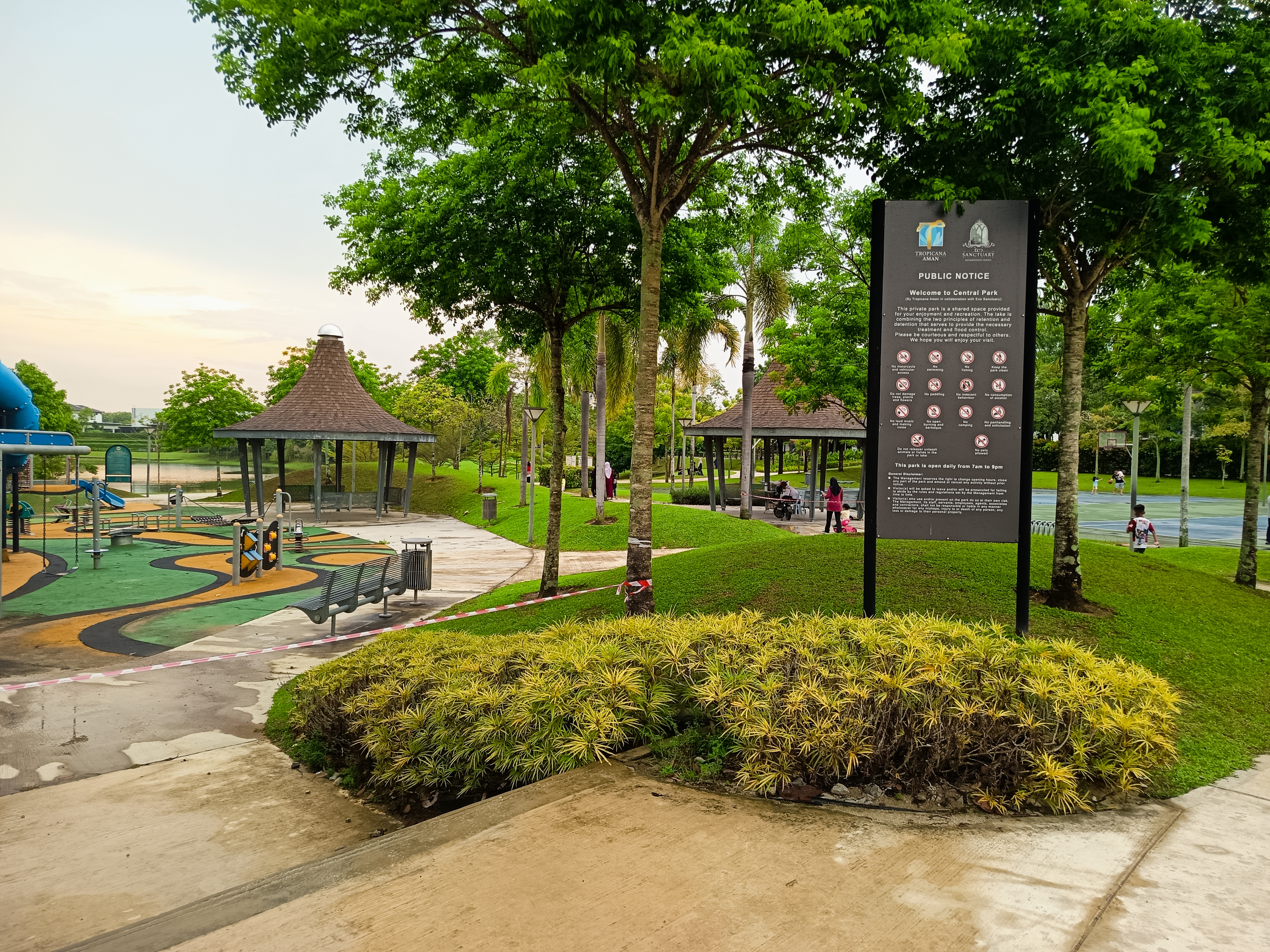
Bandar Tropicana Aman Central Park

Bandar Tropicana Aman has a central park covering an area of 85 acres (34 ha). The central park is divided into two parts: Eastlake Park and Westlake Park.

In addition, Bandar Tropicana Aman has a recreation centre located near the central park.

=== Education ===
There are two main schools in Bandar Tropicana Aman: SJK (C) Bukit Fraser and Tenby International School.

== Transport ==
=== Expressways/Highways ===
Bandar Tropicana Aman is accessible through these 5 main expressways/highways.

- North–South Expressway Central Link (ELITE)
- South Klang Valley Expressway (SKVE)
- Shah Alam Expressway (KESAS)
- Kemuning–Shah Alam Highway (LKSA)
- West Coast Expressway (WCE)

=== Public transportation ===
SP31 KJ37 Putra Heights LRT station is the closest rail station to Bandar Tropicana Aman by distance via North–South Expressway Central Link (ELITE).
