= Bandar Rimbayu =

Township in Selangor, Malaysia

- Township
- Rimbayu
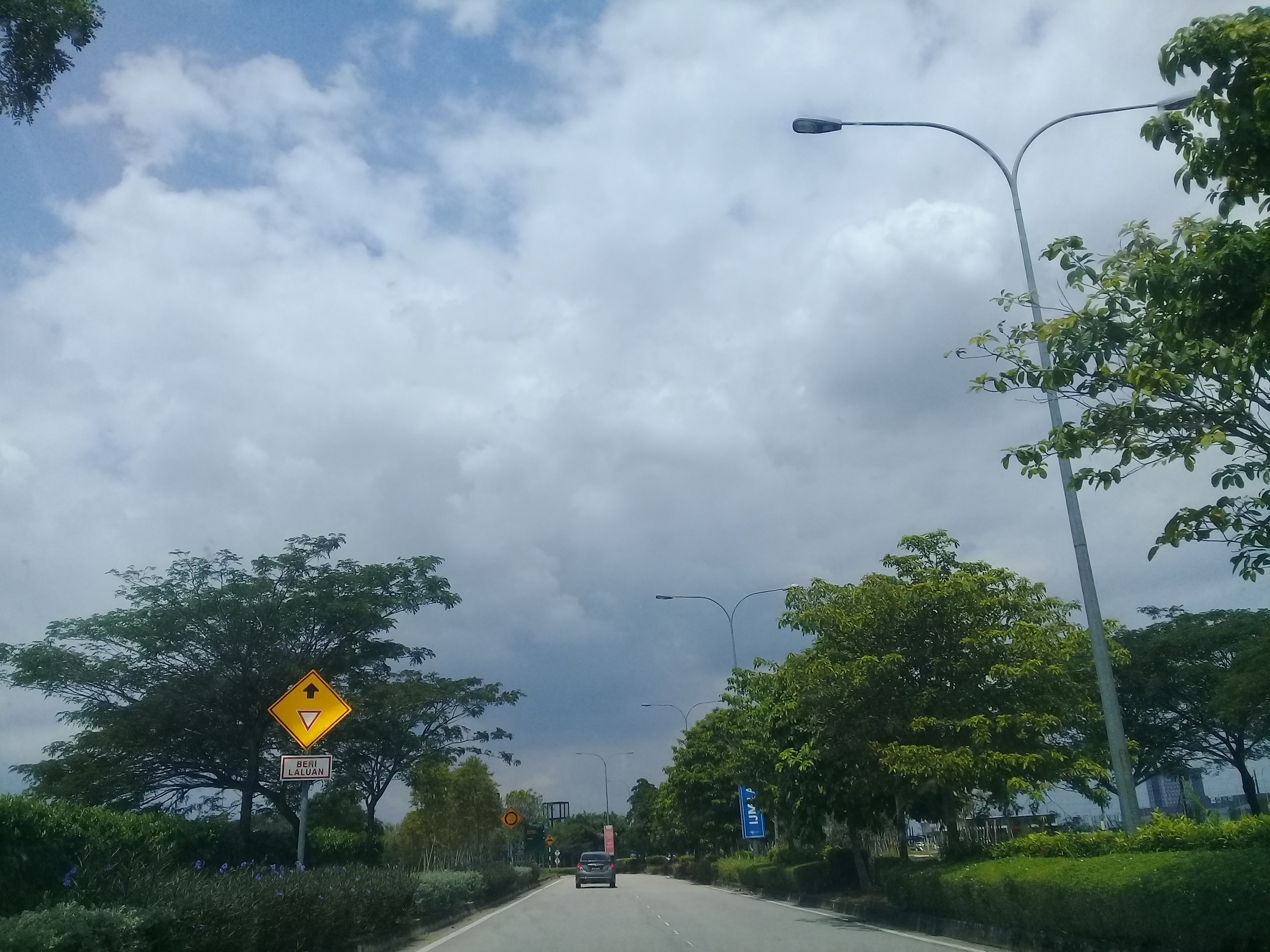
- Road in Bandar Rimbayu

- Logo

- Location within Selangor Location within Peninsular Malaysia Location within Malaysia
- Coordinates: 2.940898°N 101.5462473°E
- Country: Malaysia
- State: Selangor
- District: Kuala Langat
- Established: 2013
- Founder: IJM Land

Area
  - Total: 7.6 km^{2} (2.9 sq mi)
- Time zone: UTC+8 (MYT)
- Postal code: 42500

Bandar Rimbayu is a 1,879 acre township developed by IJM Land. It is nearby Bandar Saujana Putra, Tropicana Aman and Kampung Lombong. It was launched in 2013 with the development costing RM11 billion. The postal code for Bandar Rimbayu is 42500 Telok Panglima Garang.

== Place of interest ==
- Lotus's
- McDonald's
- Quayside Mall
- Oasis International School Kuala Lumpur
- Sanctuary Mall
- Triana Pitstop
- Rimbayu Linear Park
- The Club
- Ancubic Pickle Club
- Tropicana Aman Central Park

== Transport ==
=== Car ===
Rimbayu is accessible to 4 highways/expressways.

- Kemuning–Shah Alam Highway
- South Klang Valley Expressway
- North–South Expressway Central Link
- Shah Alam Expressway

=== Public transportation ===
SP31 KJ37 Putra Heights LRT station is the closest rail station to Bandar Rimbayu by distance via North–South Expressway Central Link (ELITE).
