= Bandar Saujana Putra =

Bandar Saujana Putra BSP
- Township

Other transcription(s)
  - Jawi script: باندر ساوجان ڤوترا
  - Chinese: 太子城
  - Tamil: சௌஜனா புத்ரா நகரம்
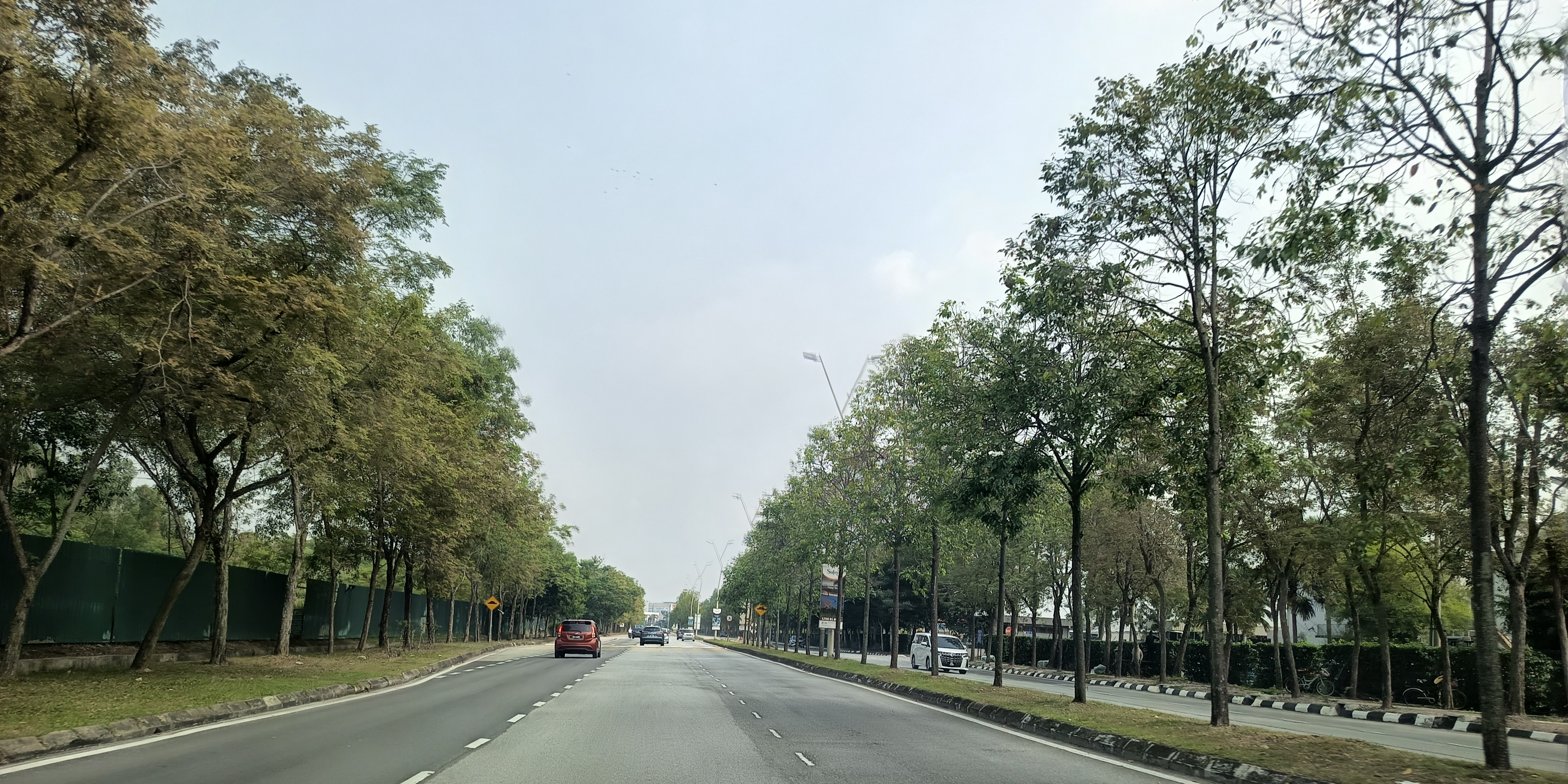
- Main road of Bandar Saujana Putra in 2026
- Interactive map of Bandar Saujana Putra
- Coordinates: 2°57′08.1″N 101°34′47.1″E
- Country: Malaysia
- State: Selangor
- District: Kuala Langat
- Established: 2003
- Founder: LBS Bina Berhad
- Kuala Langat Branch: Bandar Saujana Putra Branch, Kuala Langat Municipal Council (MPKL)

Government
  - Administered by: Kuala Langat Municipal Council

Population
  - Total: 30,000 (approximately)
- Time zone: UTC+8 (MST)
- Postcode: 42610
- Area codes: +603-51, +603-5614
- Website: www.mpkl.gov.my

Bandar Saujana Putra is a township in Mukim Tanjong Duabelas, northeast of Kuala Langat District, state of Selangor, Malaysia. It is located across the Klang River from Putra Heights, and across the ELITE toll road from Cyberjaya. This township was established in 2003 by LBS Bina Berhad. The postal code for Bandar Saujana Putra is 42610 Jenjarom.

It is also under the administration of Zone 7 of the Kuala Langat Municipal Council (MPKL).

== Location, Area Description and Demographic ==
Bandar Saujana Putra is an 850 acres township developed by LBS Bina Berhad in 2003. It is estimated that 20,000 residents live in the township following the completion of 6,000 units.

Saujana Business Park, BSP Village and Saujana Avenue are the only commercial developments that have many amenities to serve the residents of Bandar Saujana Putra, while hospitals, hypermarkets and shopping malls are currently under construction.

As of 2019, Bandar Saujana Putra consists of 13,000 housing units with a density of 65,000 people.

== Areas in Bandar Saujana Putra ==
Bandar Saujana Putra has area zones, from Persiaran Saujana Putra, to Jalan SP7. Also, SP 11 is an area of BSP even though it is far from the town center.

- Persiaran Saujana Putra:
  - SP 1
  - SP 2
  - SP 3
- Persiaran Saujana Putra Utama:
  - SPU (shop lot)
  - SP 4
  - SP 5 (BSP Village)
  - SP 6
- Jalan SP7:
  - SP 7
  - SP 8
  - SP 9 & SP 10 (BSP Avenue)
- Jalan SP 11/1:
  - SP 11 (BSP Sutera, Idaman BSP)

== Education ==
MAHSA International School and MAHSA University, as well as SK & SMK Bandar Saujana Putra are the only educational institutions serving in this township. However, there are nearby schools and universities in Bandar Rimbayu, Puchong, Shah Alam, UEP Subang Jaya, Kuala Langat, Putra Heights, Putrajaya and Cyberjaya, a 15 to 20 minute drive from the township.

=== Universities ===
- MAHSA University (SP2, Bandar Saujana Putra)
- Multimedia University (Cyberjaya)
- Limkokwing University of Creative Technology (Cyberjaya)
- Heriot-Watt University (Putrajaya)
- Management & Science University (Shah Alam)

=== Government schools ===
- SMK Bandar Saujana Putra
- SK Bandar Saujana Putra
- SK Alam Megah 1, 2 & 3 (Section 27 & 28, Shah Alam)
- SMK Alam Megah 1 & 2 (Section 27 & 28, Shah Alam)
- SK Seksyen 27 (Section 27 & 28, Shah Alam)
- SK Taman Putra Perdana 1 & 2 (Puchong)
- SMK Putra Perdana (Puchong)
- SK USJ 2, 6 & 20 (UEP Subang Jaya)
- SMK USJ 4, 8, 12, 13 & 23 (UEP Subang Jaya)
- Sekolah Wawasan USJ 15 (UEP Subang Jaya)
- SJK (C) Chee Wen, USJ 1 (UEP Subang Jaya)
- SK Jenjarom (Jenjarom)
- SMK Jenjarom (Jenjarom)
- SMK Puchong Utama 1 & 2 (Puchong)
- SK Pulau Meranti (Puchong)
- SMK Puchong Batu 14 (Puchong)
- Sekolah Rendah Agama Desa Ayer Hitam (Puchong)
- SMK Cyberjaya (Cyberjaya)
- SRJK (C) Tun Tan Siew Sin (Putra Heights)
- SK Putra Heights 2 (Putra Heights)

=== International schools ===
- Taylor's International School (Puchong)
- Kingsley International School (Putra Heights)
- Nexus International School (Putrajaya)
- Korean School of Malaysia (Cyberjaya)
- MAHSA International School (SP1, Bandar Saujana Putra)
- Oasis International School (Bandar Rimbayu)
- Sau Seng Lum International School (Bandar Rimbayu)

== Transport ==
=== Car ===
Bandar Saujana Putra is served by the ELITE toll road (E6) and the South Klang Valley Expressway (SKVE, E26).

Bandar Saujana Putra is about 30 km from the Kuala Lumpur International Airport (IATA: KUL), 18 km to Cyberjaya, and 6 km to Putra Heights via the ELITE toll road.

Telok Panglima Garang is 21 km from Bandar Saujana Putra via the SKVE toll road. Regional centre Banting is accessible from Telok Panglima Garang via highway 5.

=== Public transportation ===
Until 30 April 2025, public transportation connections from Bandar Saujana Putra are limited. Previously there was a bus route T760, operated by Nadi Putra, connecting Bandar Saujana Putra to Putra Heights LRT station. The route was ceased operation due to COVID-19 pandemic lockdown in spring 2020.

In December 2020, there was a tour bus operator serving the Bandar Saujana Putra-Putra Heights route which only ran on weekdays. However, shortly after an announcement in the media, the service was also cancelled. There is also no plan in sight to ease the lack of bus connection to MRT and LRT which are on time, trackable and frequent enough to service an entire township which are now, completely dependent on their own personal vehicles.

From 30 April 2025, Rapid KL introduced a demand-responsive transit (DRT) route known as Rapid on-Demand connecting Bandar Rimbayu and Bandar Saujana Putra to Putra Heights LRT station. Passengers can book the ride through the Kummute app with promotional fare of RM1 per trip.

== Recent developments in Bandar Saujana Putra ==
- 2003 - The launch of township and started with medium low cost homes and shops.
- 2009 - Bandar Saujana Putra township expanded with the launch of urban single and double-storey homes. And to cater to the expansion, LBS also launched Saujana Business Park to cater to the residences.
- 2010 - BSP launched Saujana Putra Avenue, medium high-end cluster link and semi-detached homes in a guarded community.
- 2012 - BSP launched their last landed development in the township, Royal Ivory 2 & Royal Garden.
- 2012 - The Malaysian Health Sciences Academy (MAHSA) announced the launch of the new university campus in Bandar Saujana Putra.
- 2013 - LBS launch of its first high-rise development in Saujana Putra - Saujana Putra Skypark. A 24-storey serviced residence complete with retail facilities.
- 2014 - LBS launched its second high-rise development, BSP21.
- 2015 - The completion of BSP Skypark and MAHSA University Saujana Putra campus.
- 2016 - TCS Group launched the TCS Arcadia condominium.
- 2017 - The completion of BSP Village.
- 2019 - The construction of the flyover to connect SKVE to ELITE has been signed by Seribu Baiduri Sdn Bhd (LBS Bina Group Berhad) with Permodalan Negeri Selangor Berhad (PNSB)
- 2020 - The construction of Bandar Saujana Putra Mosque starts
- 2022 - The completion of SMK Bandar Saujana Putra
- 2022 - The construction of BSP Arcadia Condominium starts
- 2022 - The construction of SK Bandar Saujana Putra starts
- 2024 - The completion of Bandar Saujana Putra Mosque
- 2024 - The completion and opening of SKVE - ELITE flyover
- 2024 - Completion and opening of SK Bandar Saujana Putra

== Improvements ==
- Jalan SP10 was temporary access road for construction vehicles to Saujana Putra Avenue. After project completed, premix road is done to serve as alternative road to Saujana Putra Avenue.
- Beautifying the lake near Camellia Cottage. Not only will we design the landscaping around the lake, we will also provide a pedestrian walkway and outdoor gym facilities.
- Upon approval from authority, the night market will be relocated from Jalan SP4/26 to SP10. This will be a dedicated area that will be better organized for residents’ convenience.
- A new flyover were built from 2019 to replace the roundabout connecting between ELITE and SKVE highways and completed in July 2024. This will improve the traffic flow from the area.
