= Selat Lumut-SKVE Bridge =

Selat Lumut-SKVE Bridge Jambatan Selat Lumut-SKVE
- Coordinates: 2°53′41″N 101°20′51″E
- Carries: Motor vehicles
- Crosses: Lumut Straits
- Locale: E26 South Klang Valley Expressway
- Official name: Selat Lumut-SKVE Bridge
- Maintained by: SKVE Holdings Sdn Bhd

Characteristics
- Design: viaduct box girder
- Total length: 1.67 km
- Width: 350m
- Longest span: 500m (0.500 km)

History
- Designer: Government of Malaysia; Malaysian Highway Authority (LLM); SKVE Holdings Sdn Bhd
- Constructed by: SKVE Holdings Sdn Bhd
- Opened: 2013

Location
- Interactive map of Selat Lumut-SKVE Bridge

Selat Lumut-SKVE Bridge is an expressway bridge across Lumut Straits in Klang Valley, Selangor, Malaysia. It is the second longest straits bridge in the Klang Valley after Selat Lumut Bridge. It connects Pulau Carey to Pulau Indah on the South Klang Valley Expressway. A runaway truck ramp is provided on both ends of the bridge because of a 4% steep grade on the bridge. The bridge is 25 metres in height and was designed to accommodate cruise lines and the shipping and maritime industries.

== History ==
Construction of Section 3 of the South Klang Valley Expressway was completed on 1 October 2013. Construction was led by SKVE Holdings Sdn Bhd, a privately held company.

== See also ==
- E26 South Klang Valley Expressway
