= SMK Bandar Saujana Putra =

Secondary school in the state of Selangor, Malaysia

Sekolah Menengah Kebangsaan Bandar Saujana Putra
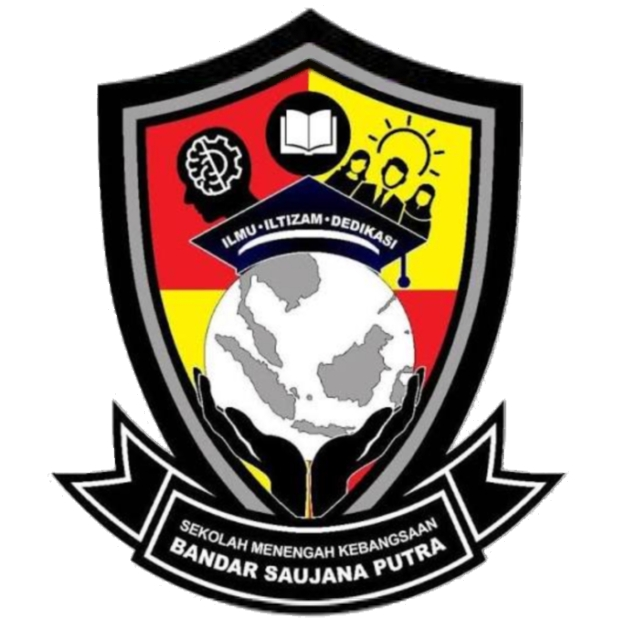

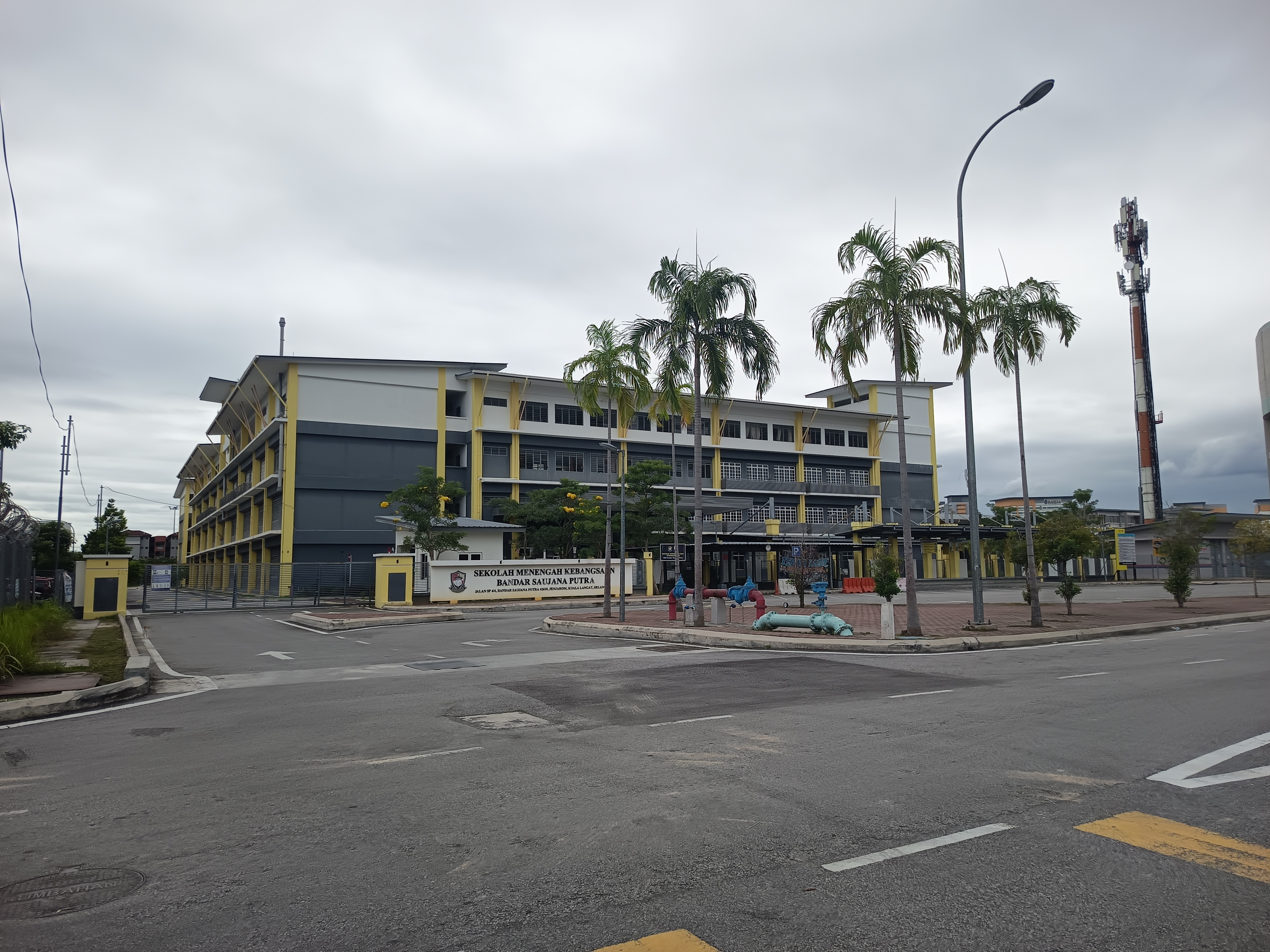
- The school building

Location
- Jalan SP 4/4, Bandar Saujana Putra, 42610 Jenjarom, Kuala Langat, Selangor, Malaysia
- 2.9563725°N 101.5829664°E

Information
- Other name: SAPUTRA
- School type: National secondary school, government school
- Motto: Ilmu, Iltizam, Dedikasi (Knowledge, Commitment, Dedication)
- Established: 2022; 4 years ago
- Status: Operating
- Authority: Kuala Langat District Education Office (PPD Kuala Langat)
- Session: Morning (Form 3–5); Afternoon (Form 1–2)
- School code: BEA1075
- Principal: Hjh. Shamsihani binti Hj. Ab. Rahim Halimi
- Grades: Form 1–5
- Gender: Mixed
- Age range: 13–17 years old
- Song: Persada SAPUTRA
- Telephone number: 03-51038917
- Website: SMK Bandar Saujana Putra on Facebook

Sekolah Menengah Kebangsaan Bandar Saujana Putra (Note: Can be written in English as "Bandar Saujana Putra National Secondary School".) (shorten to SMK Bandar Saujana Putra or SAPUTRA) is a national secondary school located in Bandar Saujana Putra, Selangor, Malaysia. This school is located under the authority of the Kuala Langat District Education Office.

The school code for SMK Bandar Saujana Putra is BEA1075.

== History ==
After 19 years of Bandar Saujana Putra being established (2003), SMK Bandar Saujana Putra was opened in March, 2022.

== School amenities ==
=== Main blocks/building ===
There are 5 main building at SMK Bandar Saujana Putra: the Knowledge block (Blok Ilmu), the Commitment block (Blok Iltizam), the Dedication block (Blok Dedikasi), the Leadership block (Blok Kepimpinan), and the Workshop block (Blok Bengkel). These buildings have 4 floors with workshop facilities, laboratories, rooms, etc. Notable facilities/rooms were KOSAPUTRA (school cooperative, koperasi sekolah) and bookshop in the Dedication block, while school musalla, discipline room, and the school office in the Leadership block.

=== Other amenities ===
- Hall: This school hall is used for assemblies, gymnasiums, etc. At the back of this hall, there are also toilets and water taps for male students to perform ablution (wudu).
- Canteen: The canteen located next to the hall provides a variety of food and drinks at reasonable prices. There is also a cafeteria for teachers located next to the canteen.
- Field: Located behind the Workshop block, this field is used for physical education activities and other sports activities. This field has a small pavilion. This field is also shared with the school located next to it, namely SK Saujana Putra.

== School song ==
Title: Persada SAPUTRA Composer: Muzaiful Dani Lyrics: Nurul Aina Sofia binti Azman
Lyrics in Malay (original)
Putera Puteri SAPUTRA
Generasi celik harapan bangsa
Di medan ilmu berakhlak jaya
Insan berilmu nadi negara

Putera Puteri SAPUTRA
Generasi celik harapan bangsa
Nasihat pujangga pedoman jiwa
Iltizam berpanji agama
Mendidik, Dididik, Terdidik
Mencurah keringat dedikasi

Putera Puteri generasi celik
Mara menggenggam
Ilmu dijulang
Menjunjung mandat negara tercinta
Impian dan harapan pasti dicapai
Ilmu Iltizam Dedikasi
Di Persada SAPUTRA terbilang

== Co-curricular activities ==
=== Sports ===
==== Sports houses ====
There are 5 sports houses in this school:

- Challenger Red
- Columbia Yellow
- Discovery Green
- Atlantis Blue
- Endeavour Purple

==== Sports and games ====
1. Badminton
2. Handball
3. Netball
4. Football
5. Volleyball
6. Tenpin bowling
7. Chess
8. Hockey
9. Athletics
10. Sepak takraw

=== Clubs and associations ===
1. English language
2. Malay language
3. Young Doctors (Doktor Muda)
4. Photographer
5. ICT
6. Career
7. Entrepreneurship
8. Crime Prevention (Pencegahan Jenayah)
9. Islamic education
10. Rukun Negara
11. Arts and Culture (Note: Also known as the Arts of Music Club)
12. SPBT (Skim Pinjaman Buku Teks; in English: Textbook Loan Scheme)
13. STEM

=== Uniformed unit ===
1. Scouts
2. BSMM (Bulan Sabit Merah Malaysia; in English: Malaysian Red Crescent)
3. Fire & Rescue Cadets
4. Police Cadets
5. Girl Guides (Pandu Puteri)
6. Islamic Princess (Puteri Islam)
7. Civil Defense School Cadets
8. School Youth Cadet Corps (Kadet Remaja Sekolah)
