= IOI City Mall =

Shopping mall in Sepang, Selangor, Malaysia

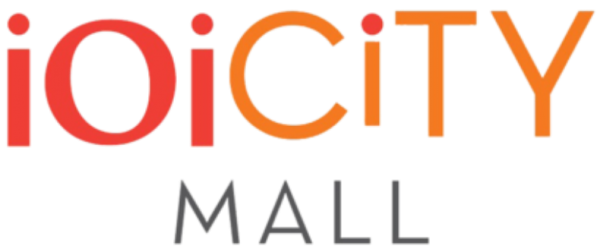

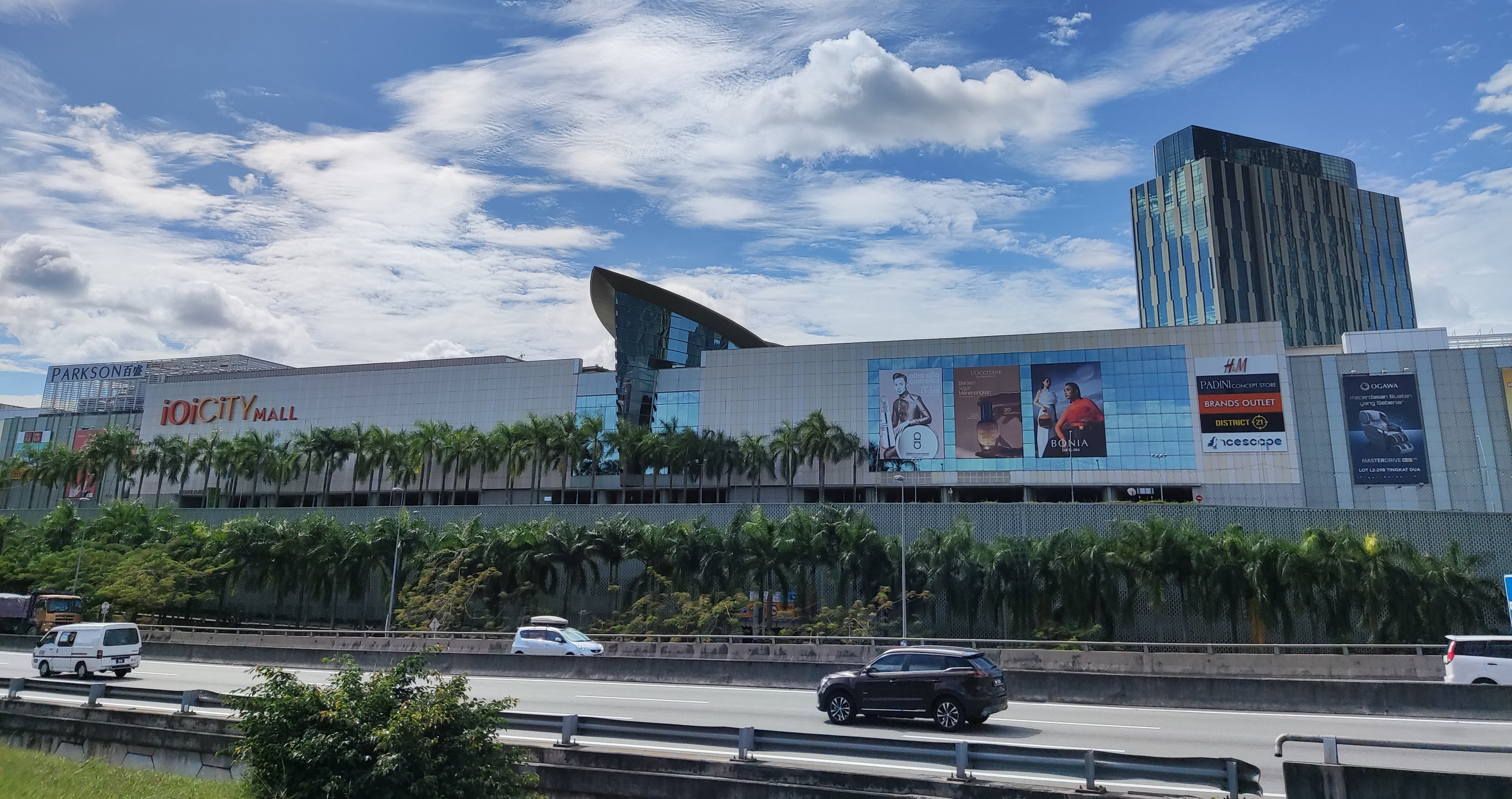
- Exterior view from north side
- Alternative names: IOI Putrajaya, ICM

General information
- Status: Completed (Phase 1 & 2) Upcoming (Phase 3)
- Type: Shopping mall
- Architectural style: Contemporary, Modern
- Location: IOI Resort City, Lebuh IRC, Sepang District, Selangor, Malaysia
- Coordinates: 2°58′12″N 101°42′54″E
- Current tenants: GSC Cinemas, Parkson, Lotus's, HomePro, Harvey Norman, Food Junction, All IT Hypermarket, IOI City Farm, Wangsa Bowl, District 21, Icescape Ice Rink (phase 1); AEON, Nitori, GSC Cinemas, Jollibee, Maju Home Concept, PROTON Premium Outlet, FOOD EMPIRE, Kiddytopia, BELIEVE FITNESS, Best Denki, Objet, IOI Sports Centre, IOI Grand Hall Exhibition Centre (phase 2)
- Opened: November 20, 2014; 11 years ago
- Renovated: August 25, 2022; 4 years ago
- Cost: RM 2 billion
- Renovation cost: RM 300 Million
- Owner: IOI Properties

Technical details
- Size: 8,840,000 sq ft (821,000 m^{2})
- Floor area: 2,500,000 sq ft (230,000 m^{2})

Design and construction
- Awards: FIABCI-Malaysia Property Award 2016
- Known for: Winner of Retail Company

Other information
- Number of stores: 700+
- Number of anchors: 13
- Parking: 16,600
- Public transit: KT3 PY41 Putrajaya Sentral & KB05 Serdang KTM (via bus route T 523); PY34 UPM (via Trek Rides DRT)

Website
- www.ioicitymall.com.my

IOI City Mall is a shopping mall located in Sepang District, Selangor, Malaysia, which was developed by IOI Properties Group Berhad and opened on 20 November 2014.

The second phase of the mall opened on 25 August 2022, making it the largest shopping mall in Malaysia surpassing 1 Utama, as well as the largest mall in Southeast Asia and third largest mall in the world as of April 2026.

== Features ==
IOI City Mall contains 2,500,000 sq ft (230,000 m^{2}) of retail space for both phases, with over 650 stores.

Phase 1 of IOI City Mall opened in November 2014 with a net lettable area of 1,500,000 sq ft (140,000 m^{2}) across three levels with 350 tenants. The Phase 1 section of the mall also features District 21, a post-apocalypse themed recreational park, two ice skating rinks, an edutainment exhibition space with an “indoor living planet” concept, and Golden Screen Cinemas with GSC Maxx and 4DX halls.

Phase 2 of IOI City Mall opened in August 2022, adding an additional net lettable area of 1,000,000 sq ft (93,000 m^{2}) and over 300 new retail stores, luxury brands, and new restaurants and cafés, along with a fitness centre, a multi-purpose sports hall with badminton and futsal courts, an exhibition hall, Proton Premium Outlet, and a Golden Screen Cinemas expansion branch featuring Malaysia's first IMAX hall with laser projection, GSC BIG, Play+, & ONYX hall.

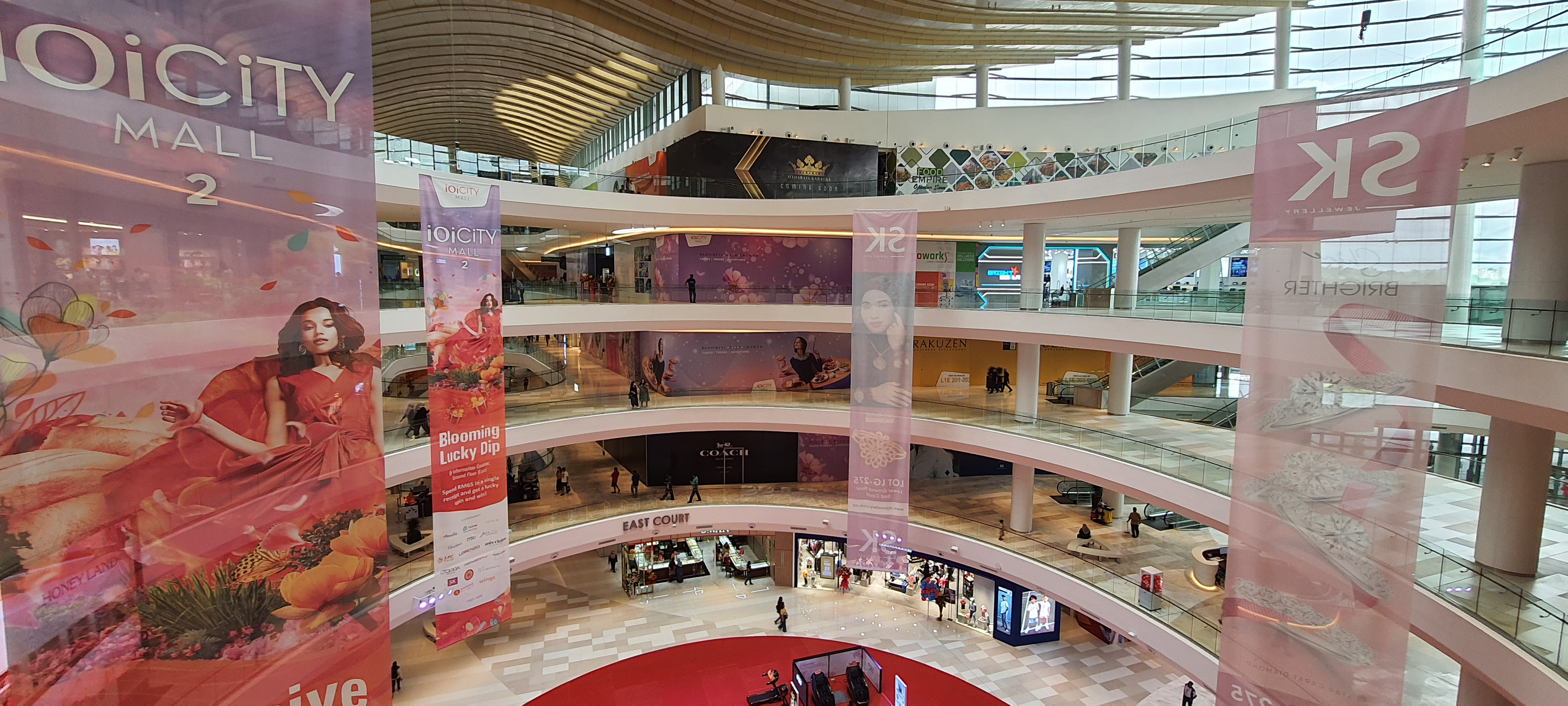
IOI City Mall 2 atrium in August 2022, days after its opening.

== Access ==
=== Car ===
IOI City Mall is located near the South Klang Valley Expressway (SKVE) with over 16,600 parking bays provided. Despite the mall being branded for the administrative capital, Putrajaya, it is actually located in the Sepang District of Selangor, while Putrajaya itself is located 9km from the mall. The mall is 35km from Kuala Lumpur International Airport and reachable within 30 minutes.

=== Rail ===
The nearest rail stations to serve IOI City Mall are KB05 Serdang KTM and PY34 UPM MRT station. Currently there are no direct feeder buses from MRT stations to the mall, including the mall's own shuttle bus service which have ceased operation during pandemic from May 2020 onwards (they provide the shuttle bus service from the Serdang KTM and KB06 KG35 Kajang station).

=== Bus ===
IOI City Mall Bus Terminal

Currently, no Rapid KL or MRT feeder bus services are available to serve IOI City Mall, however it is instead served by the stage bus route 523 by KR Travel & Tours from KT3 PY41 Putrajaya Sentral MRT/ERL station, KB05 Serdang KTM station and Lebuh Pudu bus hub in Kuala Lumpur with trips running every hour. The free bus route SPG 04 by Smart Selangor MPSepang from Taman Seroja Bandar Baru Salak Tinggi and Hospital Serdang is available until 31 March 2025. All the bus routes stop at the terminal hub located in P3 floor of Phase 1, which is shared with the motorcycle parking.

Since February 2024, IOI City Mall and the nearby locations in IOI Resort City is also accessible via Trek Rides demand-responsive transport (DRT) service powered by Selangor Mobility under the UPM-Serdang zone, with PY34 MRT UPM station is the nearest public transport stop for the service.

== See also ==
- IOI Mall Puchong
