= Malaysia Agro Exposition Park Serdang =

Convention center in Selangor, Malaysia

Coordinates: 2.9796515°N 101.6961694°E

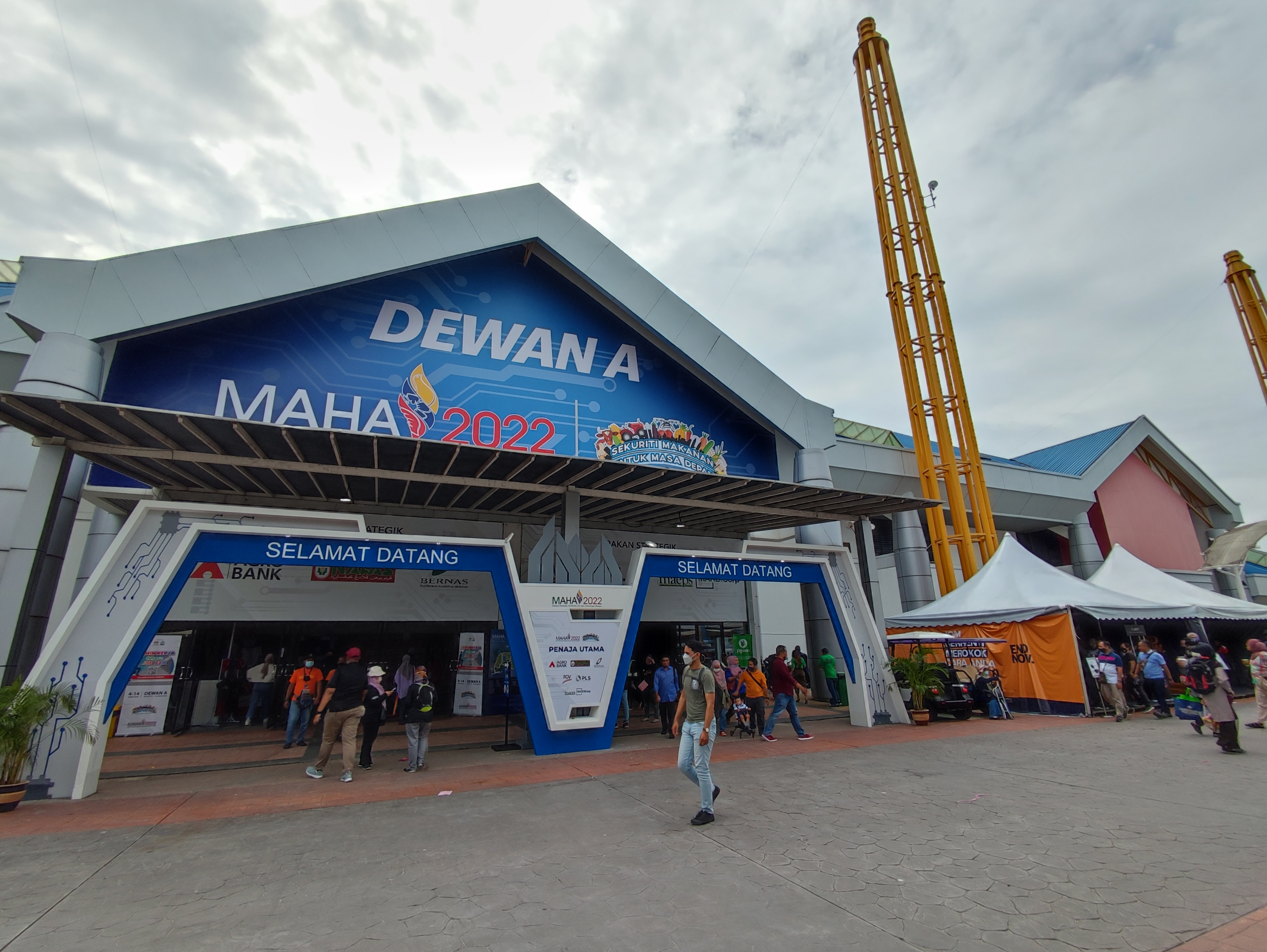
MAEPS on the first day of MAHA 2022

The Malaysia Agro Exposition Park Serdang (MAEPS; Malay: Taman Ekspo Pertanian Malaysia Serdang) is an agro park in Sepang District, Selangor, Malaysia. It is the largest agro park in Malaysia and Asia. It was created under an initiative by the Malaysian Ministry of Agriculture to be a venue for meetings, incentives, conferences and exhibitions (MICE), especially for those catering towards the agriculture, horticulture and agrotourism field.

== Geography and facilities ==
MAEPS is situated to the south of the Malaysian Agricultural Research and Development Institute. It is accessible via the South Klang Valley Expressway.

The convention centre has four halls (Halls A to D), which are situated on 368 acres (149 hectares) of land. The buildings and outdoor spaces were designed to bring out the best of the surrounding landscape.

== History ==
The Malaysia Agriculture, Horticulture and Agrotourism Show (MAHA) is held here once every two years except year 2020 which is cancelled due to COVID-19 pandemic. The

During the COVID-19 pandemic in Malaysia, MAEPS was converted into makeshift hospital to treat the infected patients. The hospital location is called the COVID-19 Quarantine and Low-Risk Treatment Centre. MAEPS is expected to receive its first patient with low risk one week after its conversion process is complete. It has started to operation since 23 April with 12 patients.

== Events ==
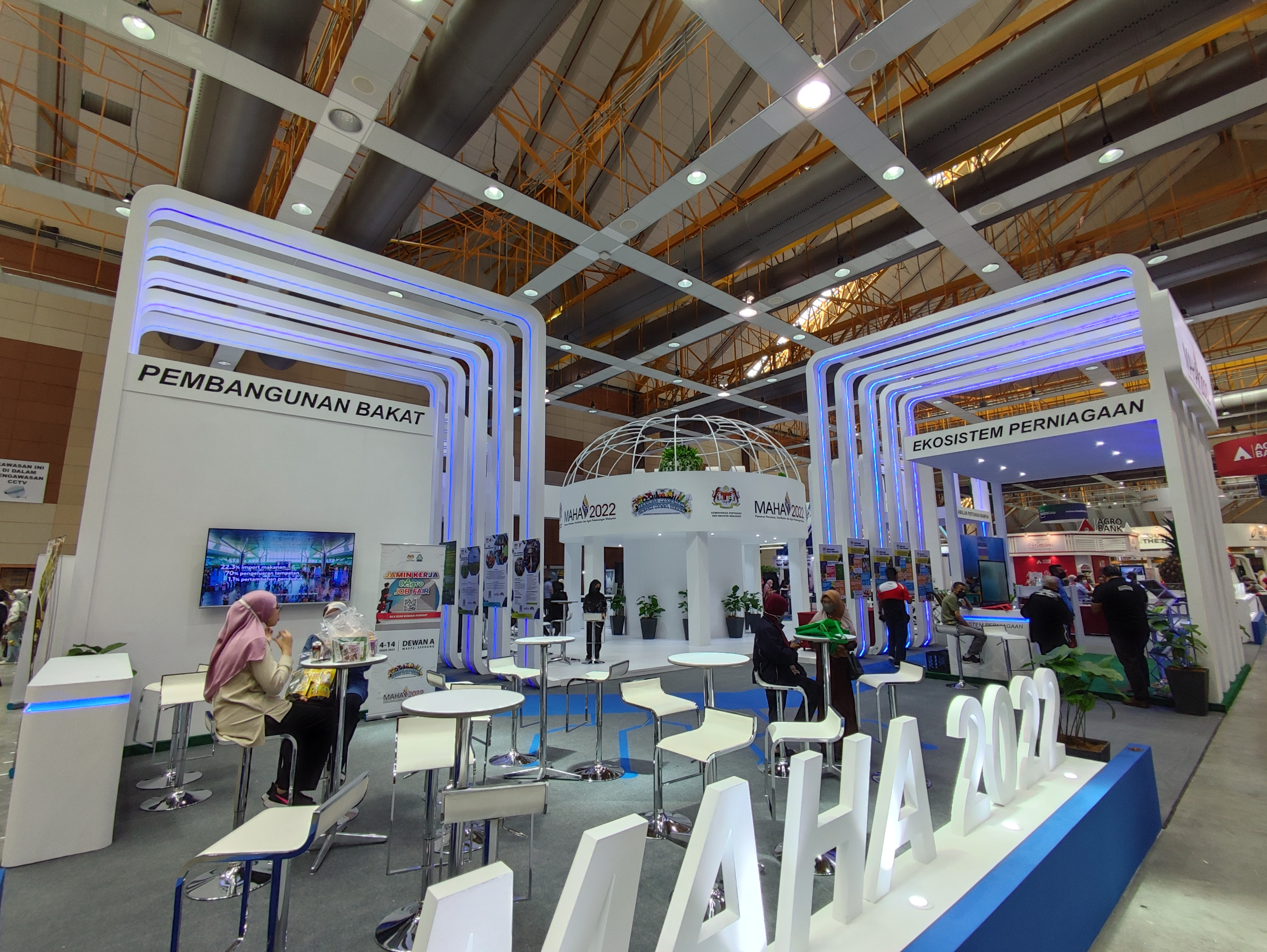
The MAFI's booth in MAHA 2022

- 21 – 26 November 2006: Malaysia Agriculture, Horticulture and Agrotourism Show (MAHA 2006)
- 11 – 23 August 2008: Malaysia Agriculture, Horticulture and Agrotourism Show (MAHA 2008)
- Export Furniture Exhibition, 2009
- 29 November – 12 December 2010: Malaysia Agriculture, Horticulture and Agrotourism Show (MAHA 2010)
- 23 November – 2 December 2012: Malaysia Agriculture, Horticulture and Agrotourism Show (MAHA 2012)
- Malaysia International Tourism Exchange, 2012
- Karnival & Ekspo Kemahiran Kebangsaan, 2013
- Urbanscapes 2013
- 20 – 30 November 2014: Malaysia Agriculture, Horticulture and Agrotourism Show (MAHA 2014)
- 1 – 11 December 2016: Malaysia Agriculture, Horticulture and Agrotourism Show (MAHA 2016)
- 22 November – 2 December 2018: Malaysia Agriculture, Horticulture and Agrotourism Show (MAHA 2018)
- 4 – 14 August 2022: Malaysia Agriculture, Horticulture and Agrotourism Show (MAHA 2022)
- Malaysia Autoshow
- 11 – 22 September 2024: Malaysia Agriculture, Horticulture and Agrotourism Show (MAHA 2024)
- 28 August – 6 September 2026: Malaysia Agriculture, Horticulture and Agrotourism Show (MAHA 2026)

== Transportation ==
Currently there are no bus services are available to serve MAEPS Serdang. The nearest train station to MAEPS are MRT UPM located 6 km away and Serdang KTM located 13 km away.

Only during certain events such as MAHA expo (except MAHA 2022) will provide shuttle bus services from train stations or locations of interest to MAEPS Serdang.
