= South Klang Valley Expressway =

Road in Malaysia

Expressway 26
- South Klang Valley Expressway; Lebuhraya SKVE 南巴生谷大道

Route information
- Maintained by SKVE Holdings Sdn Bhd
- Length: 51.7 km (32.1 mi) Section 1: 19.99 km (12.42 mi); Section 2: 12.96 km (8.05 mi); Section 3: 18.81 km (11.69 mi)
- Existed: 1998–present
- History: Initially completed in 2000, Phase 2 built in 2007–2011 and Phase 3 built in 2010–2013

Major junctions
- East end: Uniten Interchange
- Kajang Dispersal Link Expressway; B13 Jalan Uniten–Dengkil; FT 345 Jalan Hospital Serdang; Persiaran Persekutuan; Persiaran Utara; FT 29 Putrajaya–Cyberjaya Expressway; Damansara–Puchong Expressway; North–South Expressway Central Link / AH2; West Coast Expressway; FT 5 Klang–Banting Highway; FT 347 Persiaran Pulau Lumut
- West end: Pulau Indah, Klang

Location
- Country: Malaysia
- Primary destinations: Kajang, Putrajaya, Cyberjaya, Bandar Saujana Putra, Teluk Panglima Garang, Banting, Carey Island, Pulau Indah

Highway system
- Highways in Malaysia; Expressways; Federal; State

The E26 South Klang Valley Expressway, or SKVE (Malay: Lebuhraya Lembah Klang Selatan; Chinese: 南巴生谷大道), is an dual-carriageway expressway in the southern part of Klang Valley, Malaysia's most densely populated region. Since Dec 2000, this 51.7 km (32.1 mi) expressway directly links Klang Ports in the west coast to Putrajaya, one of the federal territories of Malaysia.

South Klang Valley Expressway is the fifth east–west-oriented expressway in the Klang Valley after the FR2 Federal Highway, the E1 New Klang Valley Expressway (NKVE), the E25 Kuala Lumpur–Kuala Selangor Expressway (LATAR) and the E5 Shah Alam Expressway (KESAS).

== Route background ==
The zeroeth kilometre of the expressway is located right after the Uniten Interchange at the E18 Kajang Dispersal Link Expressway (SILK).

== History ==
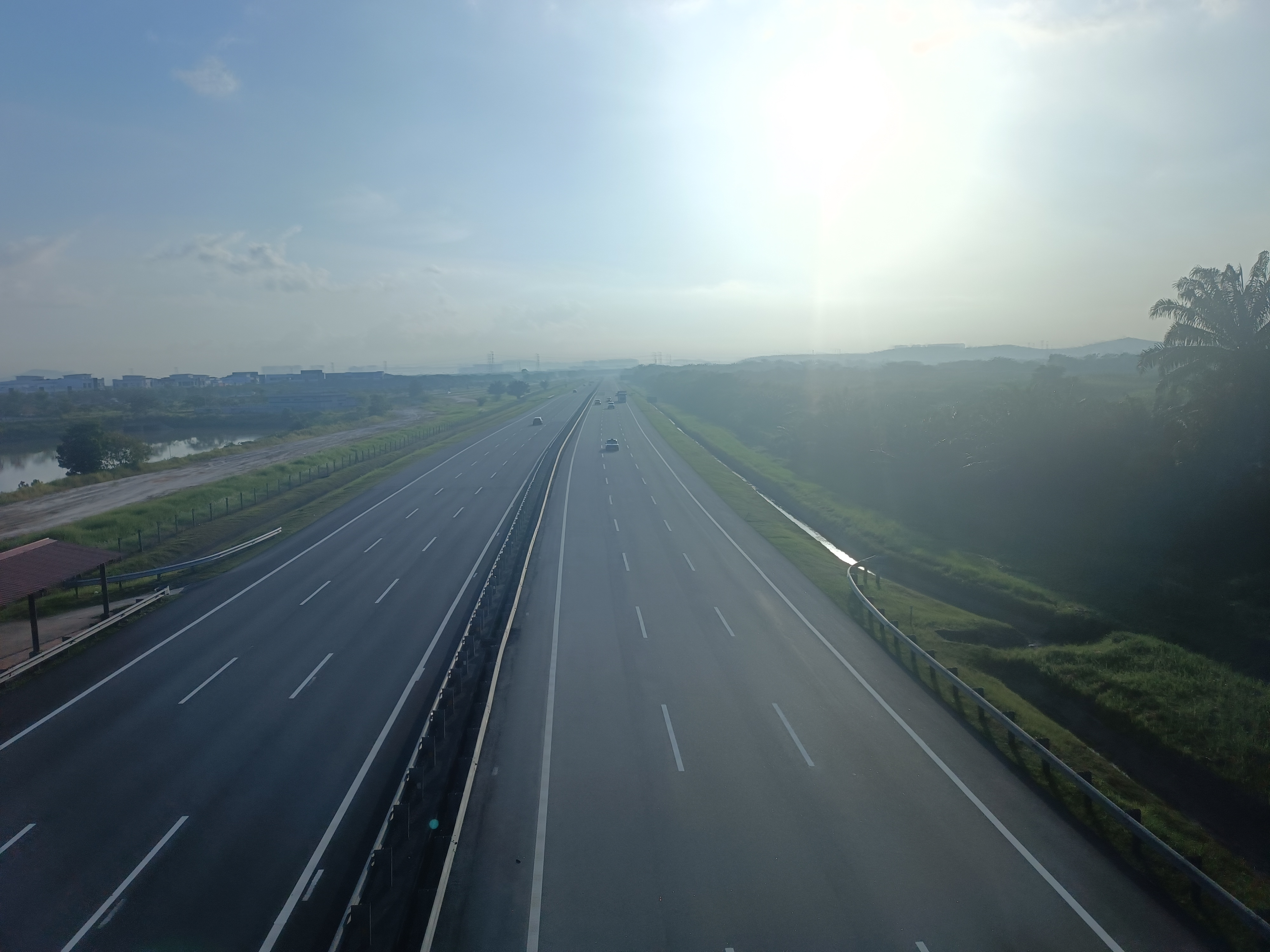
SKVE near Rimbayu

The first 7.95 km (section 1A) stretch that starts at the UNITEN interchange in Bangi is toll free, and had been open for several years. It was built by the Malaysian Public Works Department (JKR). The section 1B, 2 and 3 stretch of SKVE are to be built by SKVE Holdings Sdn Bhd. The section 1B stretch of the expressway between Cyberjaya to Bandar Saujana Putra was completed in June 2010.

The section 2 stretch of the expressway from Bandar Saujana Putra towards Telok Panglima Garang measuring 12.96 km long would have been completed in 2011. SKVE’s last stretch is the 18.81 km long section 3 and connects to Pulau Carey before terminating at the Pulau Indah interchange, serving as a direct link between Putrajaya and Westports in Port Klang.

Section 1B of this expressway between Cyberjaya to Bandar Saujana Putra was opened to traffic on 1 July 2010. Meanwhile, the section 2 stretch of the expressway between Bandar Saujana Putra to Telok Panglima Garang was opened on 29 May 2012 and the final stretch, section 3 of the expressway between Telok Panglima Garang to Pulau Indah was opened on 1 October 2013.

Phase	Project Start Date	Completion Date	Distance Covered (km)	Location (by exits)	Number of Lane*
Section 1A	-	Dec 2020	7.95	HSA (2601) - SKVE (2606)	3-4
Section 1B	Feb 2008	Jun 2010	12.04	SKVE (2606) - SSP (2607)	2
Section 2	Feb 2008	May 2012	12.96	SSP (2607) - TPG (2608)	2-3
Section 3	Feb 2008	Sep 2013	18.81	TPG (2608) - PIN (2611)	1-2

*The number of lane on each side, excluding emergency lanes.

== Features ==
The section between Telok Panglima Garang towards Pulau Carey and Pulau Indah is built as a two-lane expressway while retaining the full access control, making the section as the first true two-lane expressway with full access control in the Klang Valley and also the second in Malaysia after the Senai–Desaru Expressway (Cahaya Baru–Penawar sections) in Johor Bahru.

There are three main bridge along the expressway, the Jalan Puchong-Sungai Rasau bridge, the Pulau Carey-Sungai Langat bridge and the Selat Lumut-SKVE Bridge, a major landmark.

A runaway truck ramp, to stop vehicles unable to brake, is provided on both ends of the Selat Lumut-SKVE Bridge.

There are two Malaysian Road Transport Department (JPJ) Enforcement Stations at Pulau Carey, one on each side.

IOI City Mall, the largest shopping mall in Putrajaya along with the whole township of IOI Resort City, is accessible by taking the exit E2602/E2602A.

=== Lane numbers ===
Number	Sections
Six	Ayer Hitam Toll Plaza–Uniten Interchange
Six	Tanjung Dua Belas Interchange–Bandar Saujana Putra Interchange
Four	Bandar Saujana Putra Interchange–Ayer Hitam Toll Plaza
Four	Telok Panglima Garang Interchange–Tanjung Dua Belas Interchange
Four	Pulau Indah Interchange–Selat Lumut-SKVE Bridge
Two	Selat Lumut-SKVE Bridge–Pulau Carey-Sungai Langat bridge

=== Speed limits ===
The highway imposes several speed limits at different segment, including:

- 80 km/h (50 mph) - Section 1A
- 90 km/h (56 mph) - Selat Lumut-SKVE Bridge–Sungai Rasau bridge
- 60 km/h (37 mph) - within Pulau Indah and before every toll plaza
- 1 km before every toll plaza: 60 km/h (37 mph) or 50 km/h (31 mph)

== Toll systems ==
The South Klang Valley Expressway (SKVE) uses the closed toll systems. Since 1 June 2016, all toll transactions have been conducted electronically using Touch 'n Go and SmartTAGs. Since 2024, users can also make payment with bank card (MyDebit, VISA, Mastercard) or MyRFID.

=== Toll rates ===
Class	Type of vehicles	Rate (in Malaysian Ringgit (RM)) up to
0	Motorcycles, ~~bicycles or vehicles with 2 or less wheels*~~	Free
1	Vehicles with 2 axles and 3 or 4 wheels excluding taxis	8.10
2	Vehicles with 2 axles and 5 or 6 wheels excluding buses	12.20
3	Vehicles with 3 or more axles	16.30
4	Taxis	4.10
5	Buses	5.00

*Despite the classification, only motorcycles in the class can use the highway.

=== Toll plaza abbreviations ===
Abbreviation	Exit Code	Interchange	Toll Booth
HSA	2601	Hospital Serdang 1	
PUT	2602	Putra	
HSB	2603	Hospital Serdang 2	
WET	2604	Wetland	
MDI	2605	MARDI	
SKVE	2606	SKVE	
SSP	2607	SKVE Saujana Putra	Yes
TDB	2608	Tanjung Dua Belas	Yes
TPG	2609	Telok Panglima Garang	Yes
PCY	2610	Pulau Carey	Yes
PIN	2611	Pulau Indah	Yes

== Interchange lists ==
Legend:

- I/C - Interchange, I/S - Intersection, RSA - Rest and service area, OBR - Overhead bridge restaurant, R/R - Restaurant and rest plaza, L/B - Layby, V/P - Vista point, TN - tunnel, T/P - Toll plaza, BR - Bridge
- C - Cloverleaf, S - Stack, T-A - Trumpet-A, T-B - Trumpet-B, DT - Directional-T/Y, SDT - Semi-Directional-T/Y, P-Y - Partial-Y, D - Diamond, P-C - Partial cloverleaf, D-D - Diverging diamond, D-R - Direct ramp

State/territory	District	Location	km	mi	Exit	Name	Destinations	Notes
Selangor	Klang	Pulau Indah	51.7	32.1	2611	Pulau Indah I/C	FT 347 Malaysia Federal Route 347 – Pulau Indah, Westports, Port Klang Free Zone (PKFZ); FT 181 Pulau Indah Expressway – Port Klang, Southport, Northport, Klang	Directional-T
Selangor	Klang	Pulau Indah			Pulau Indah RSA (westbound; planned)			
Selangor	Klang	Pulau Indah			Pulau Indah Toll Plaza			
Selangor	Klang	Pulau Indah			Pulau Indah RSA (eastbound; planned)			
Selangor	Klang	Pulau Indah			Runaway truck ramp (westbound)			
Selangor	Klang–Kuala Langat District border		50.0	31.1	Selat Lumut-SKVE Bridge (Length: 1.7 km (1.1 mi))			
Selangor	Kuala Langat	Carey Island			Runaway truck ramp (eastbound)			
Selangor	Kuala Langat	Carey Island			2610	Pulau Carey I/C	Jalan Pulau Carey – Carey Island, Mah Meri Orang Asli Village	Trumpet; Planned
Selangor	Kuala Langat	Carey Island			JPJ Enforcement Station (both bounds; separated)			
Selangor	Kuala Langat	Carey Island			Pulau Carey-Sungai Langat bridge Sungai Langat bridge			
Selangor	Kuala Langat	Telok Panglima Garang			2609	Telok Panglima Garang I/C	FT 5 Klang–Banting Highway – Telok Panglima Garang, Klang, Banting, Sepang, Port Dickson, Bandar Jugra, Morib Beach, Bagan Lalang	Trumpet
Selangor	Kuala Langat	Telok Panglima Garang			Sungai Jarom bridge			
Selangor	Kuala Langat	Tanjung Dua Belas			2608	Tanjung Dua Belas I/C	West Coast Expressway – Ipoh, Kuala Lumpur, Shah Alam, Klang, Banting, Morib, Kuala Lumpur International Airport (KLIA), Dengkil	Trumpet; Toll system integrated with WCE
Selangor	Kuala Langat	Tanjung Dua Belas			Tanjung Dua Belas RSA (both bounds; separated) and SKVE operation office (eastbound)			
Selangor	Kuala Langat	Bandar Saujana Putra	19.8	12.3	2607	Bandar Saujana Putra I/C	Persiaran Saujana Putra – Bandar Saujana Putra, Bandar Rimbayu, Kampung Lombong; North–South Expressway Central Link / AH2 – Ipoh, Kuala Lumpur, Shah Alam, USJ, Kuala Lumpur International Airport (KLIA), Seremban, Johor Bahru	Trumpet
Selangor	Sepang	Serdang			Jalan Puchong-Sungai Rasau bridge Sungai Rasau bridge			
Selangor	Sepang	Serdang			Ayer Hitam Toll Plaza			
Selangor	Sepang	Serdang				16 Sierra I/C	Persiaran Sierra Utama – 16 Sierra	Interchange; From / to Kajang only
Selangor	Sepang	Serdang			2606	SKVE I/C	FT 29 Putrajaya–Cyberjaya Expressway – Seri Kembangan, Cyberjaya, Putrajaya, Dengkil; Damansara–Puchong Expressway – Puchong, Shah Alam, Petaling Jaya, Damansara, Kepong; North–South Expressway Central Link / AH2 – Kuala Lumpur International Airport (KLIA), Johor Bahru	Cloverleaf
Selangor	Sepang	Serdang			Petronas L/B (westbound)			
Selangor	Sepang	Serdang				Serdang Power Station Exit	Serdang Power Station, KVDT depot	Westbound only
Selangor	Sepang	Serdang			Shell L/B (eastbound)			
Selangor	Sepang	Serdang			2605	Mardi I/C	Mardi Serdang – Malaysia Agro Exposition Park Serdang (MAEPS) V	Trumpet
Selangor	Sepang	Serdang			2604	Wetland I/C (Persiaran Persekutuan I/C)	Persiaran Persekutuan – Putrajaya	Trumpet
Putrajaya	Presint 13	Wetlands Park			Putrajaya Wetlands Lake Bridge			
Selangor	Sepang	Serdang				IOI Resort City Exit Ramp	Lebuh IRC – IOI Resort City, IOI City Mall, Le Meridien Putrajaya, Marriott Hotel Putrajaya, Palm Garden Hotel Putrajaya	From eastbound only
Selangor	Sepang	Serdang	3.0	1.9	2603	Hospital Serdang I/C B	FT 345 Malaysia Federal Route 345 – Serdang Hospital, MARDI Serdang, Malaysia Agro Exposition Park Serdang (MAEPS)	Interchange; From / to Cyberjaya only
Selangor	Sepang	Serdang				IOI Resort City I/C	Lebuh IRC – IOI Resort City, IOI City Mall, Le Meridien Putrajaya, Marriott Hotel Putrajaya, Palm Garden Hotel Putrajaya	Diamond
Selangor	Sepang	Serdang	2.0	1.2	2602	Putra I/C (Persiaran Utara I/C)	Persiaran Utara – Putrajaya	Trumpet
Selangor	Sepang	Serdang	1.0	0.62	2601	Hospital Serdang I/C A	FT 345 Malaysia Federal Route 345 – Serdang Hospital, MARDI Serdang, Malaysia Agro Exposition Park Serdang (MAEPS)	Interchange; From / to Kajang only
Selangor	Sepang	Serdang	0.0	0.0	2600; 1809	Uniten I/C	Kajang Dispersal Link Expressway – Universiti Putra Malaysia (UPM), Seri Kembangan; Sungai Besi Expressway – Sungai Besi, Mines Resort City; B13 Jalan Uniten-Dengkil – Bangi, Universiti Tenaga Nasional (Uniten), Dengkil	Cloverleaf
Selangor	Sepang	Serdang	0.0	0.0	Through to Kajang Dispersal Link Expressway			
1.000 mi = 1.609 km; 1.000 km = 0.621 mi: Electronic toll collection; Proposed; Incomplete access; Route transition
