= Sultan Idris Shah Serdang Hospital =

Hospital in Sepang, Selangor, Malaysia

Coordinates: 2°58′36″N 101°43′13″E

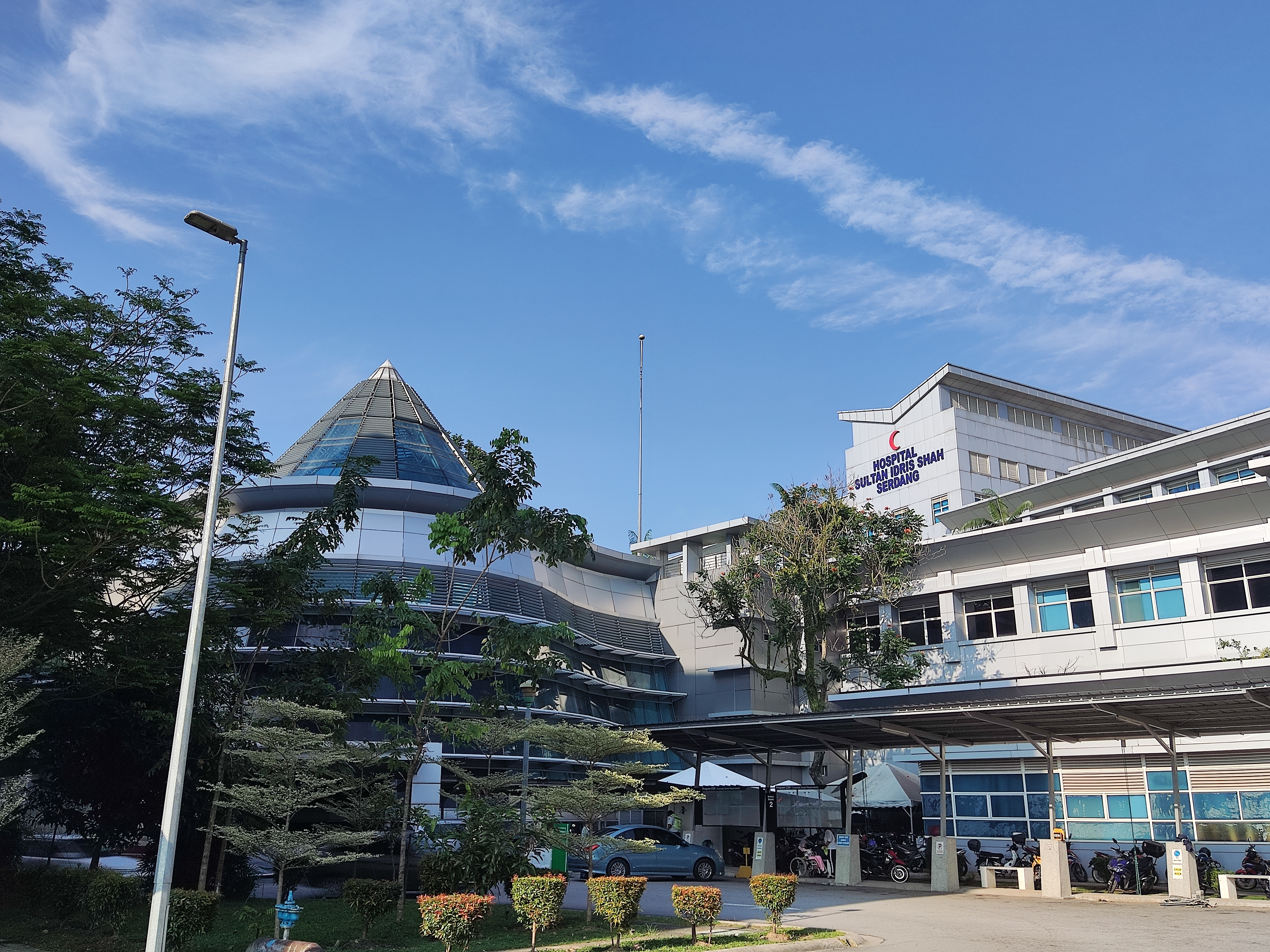

Geography
- Location: Sepang, Selangor, Malaysia

Organisation
- Care system: Public
- Type: District General

Services
- Emergency department: Yes
- Beds: 763

History
- Founded: 2006

Links
- Website: Official website
- Lists: Hospitals in Malaysia

Sultan Idris Shah Serdang Hospital, previously known as the Serdang Hospital, is a government-funded multi-specialty tertiary district general hospital located in Sepang District, Selangor, Malaysia. The location of the hospital borders the South Klang Valley Expressway (SKVE) to the east and the Faculty of Medicine and Health Sciences, Universiti Putra Malaysia (UPM) and the UPM own teaching hospital to the west. It is clearly seen from the North–South Expressway at the Kajang Interchange.

== Design ==
From planning to construction, the hospital was built on the concept of 'hospital of the future'. Sultan Idris Shah Serdang Hospital is the first hospital in Malaysia to use aluminium coating to give it a shiny exterior. It is also the first hospital in Malaysia to use a futuristic cooling system to maintain the hospital temperature and reduce electricity usage.

Other unique features of this hospital are:

- Steel structure (total 6100 tonnage)
- Modular OT
- Rooftop garden (5 acres of the 45-acre (180,000 m^{2}) total landscape area)
- Application of autoclave light concrete block (ALC)

The hospital is surrounded by a park measuring 45 acres (180,000 m^{2}). The landscape of the hospital is also known to be therapeutic to the patients.

== Services ==
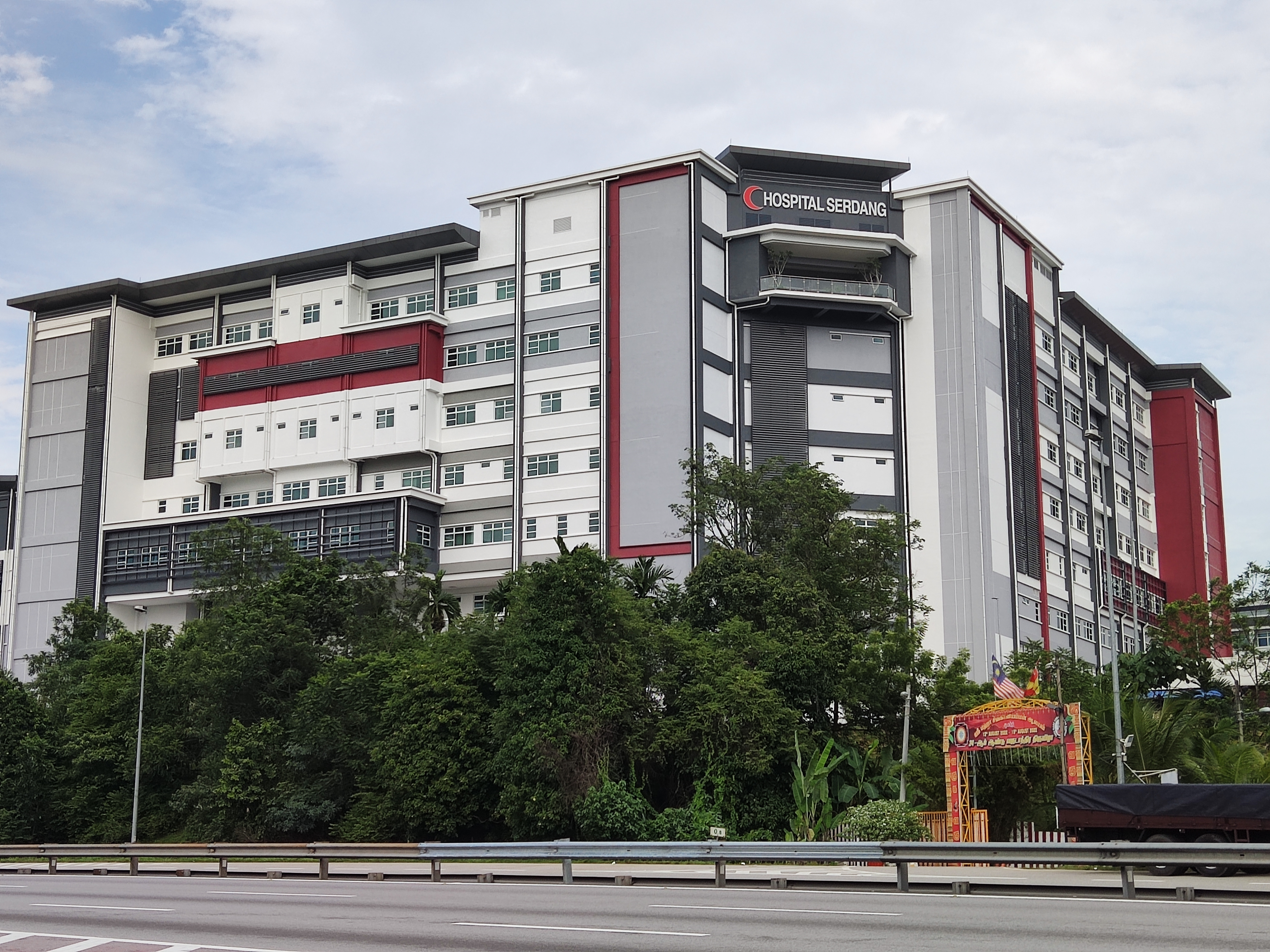
The newly built Heart Centre of Sultan Idris Shah Serdang Hospital

The management of Sultan Idris Shah Serdang Hospital heavily relies on information technology and uses the 'Total Hospital Information System'.

It is designated as the reference center for cardiology, cardiothoracic, urology and nephrology surgery. The hospital will provide affordable, quality treatment for heart patients from the lower income group. The center will co-operate with the Hospital Selayang, which specialises in renal care and liver transplants.

In total, the hospital has 20 operating theatres, 19 wards and 620 beds.

== Heart Centre ==
The Heart Centre building of Sultan Idris Shah Serdang Hospital began operations on 12 December 2022. It was officiated by then Health Minister Dr. Zaliha Mustafa. With the centre's opening, the hospital became the national referral centre for all complex heart cases.

== Teaching Hospital ==
The hospital also serves as a teaching hospital for medical students from the Faculty of Medicine and Health Sciences, Universiti Putra Malaysia (UPM) and also University of Cyberjaya (UoC). Some students from other universities such as Universiti Kuala Lumpur Royal College of Medicine Perak (UniKL RCMP), Pusrawi International College Of Medical Science and UCSI University School of Nursing also do their elective posting attachments here.

== Renaming ==
On 8 May 2023, Serdang Hospital was renamed to Sultan Idris Shah Serdang Hospital after the Sultan of Selangor Sultan Sharafuddin Idris Shah.
