= Malaysian Agricultural Research and Development Institute =

Malaysian research institute

- Institut Penyelidikan dan Kemajuan Pertanian Malaysia (MARDI)

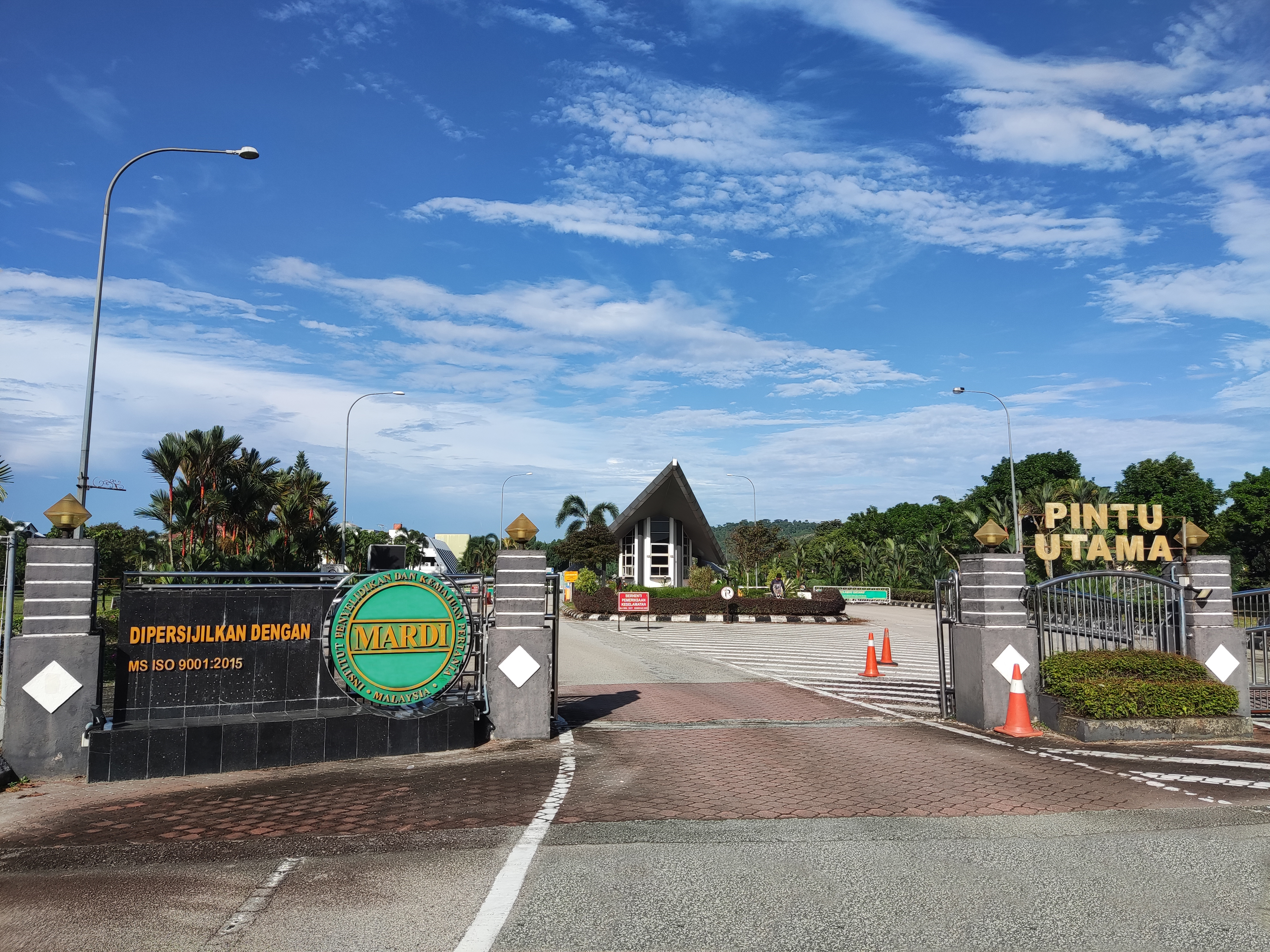
- Main entrance of MARDI

Agency overview
- Formed: 28 October 1969; 56 years ago
- Jurisdiction: Government of Malaysia
- Headquarters: Ibu Pejabat MARDI, Persiaran MARDI-UPM, 43400 Serdang, Selangor, Malaysia.
- Minister responsible: Datuk Seri Haji Mohamad Sabu, Minister of Agriculture and Food Security
- Deputy Minister responsible: Datuk Arthur Joseph Kurup, Deputy Minister of Agriculture and Food Security
- Agency executive: Dato' Dr Mohammad Zabawi B. Abd Ghani, Director General
- Parent department: Minister of Agriculture and Food Security (MAFS)
- Child agency: MARDI Corporation Sdn. Bhd
- Key document: MARDI Act 1969
- Website: portal.mardi.gov.my

Footnotes
- Malaysian Agricultural Research and Development Institute on Facebook

The Malaysian Agricultural Research and Development Institute (Malay: Institut Penyelidikan dan Kemajuan Pertanian Malaysia), abbreviated MARDI, is a government body in Malaysia under Ministry of Agriculture and Agro-based Industry (MOA).

== Malaysia Agro Exposition Park Serdang (MAEPS) ==
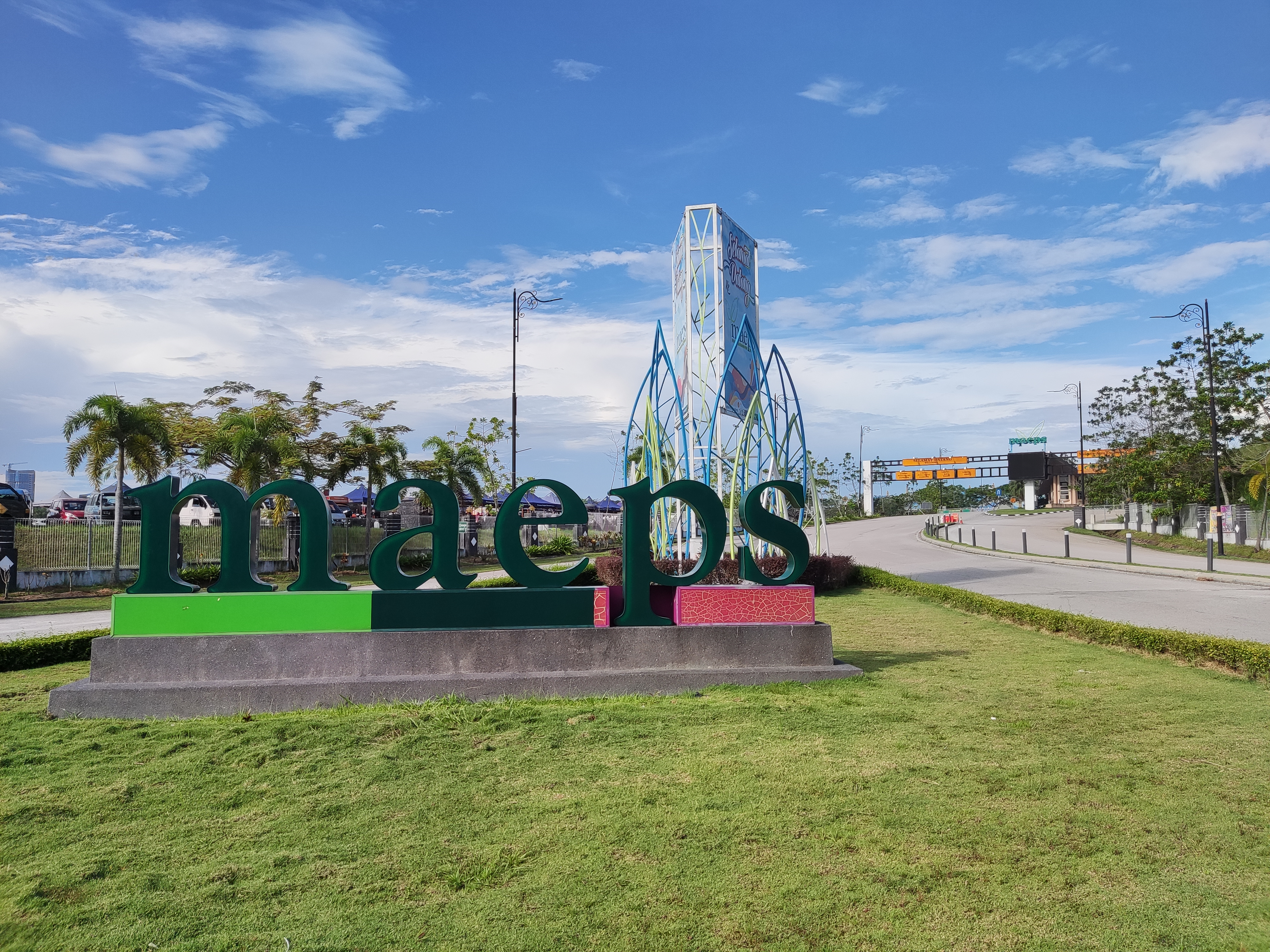
Main entrance

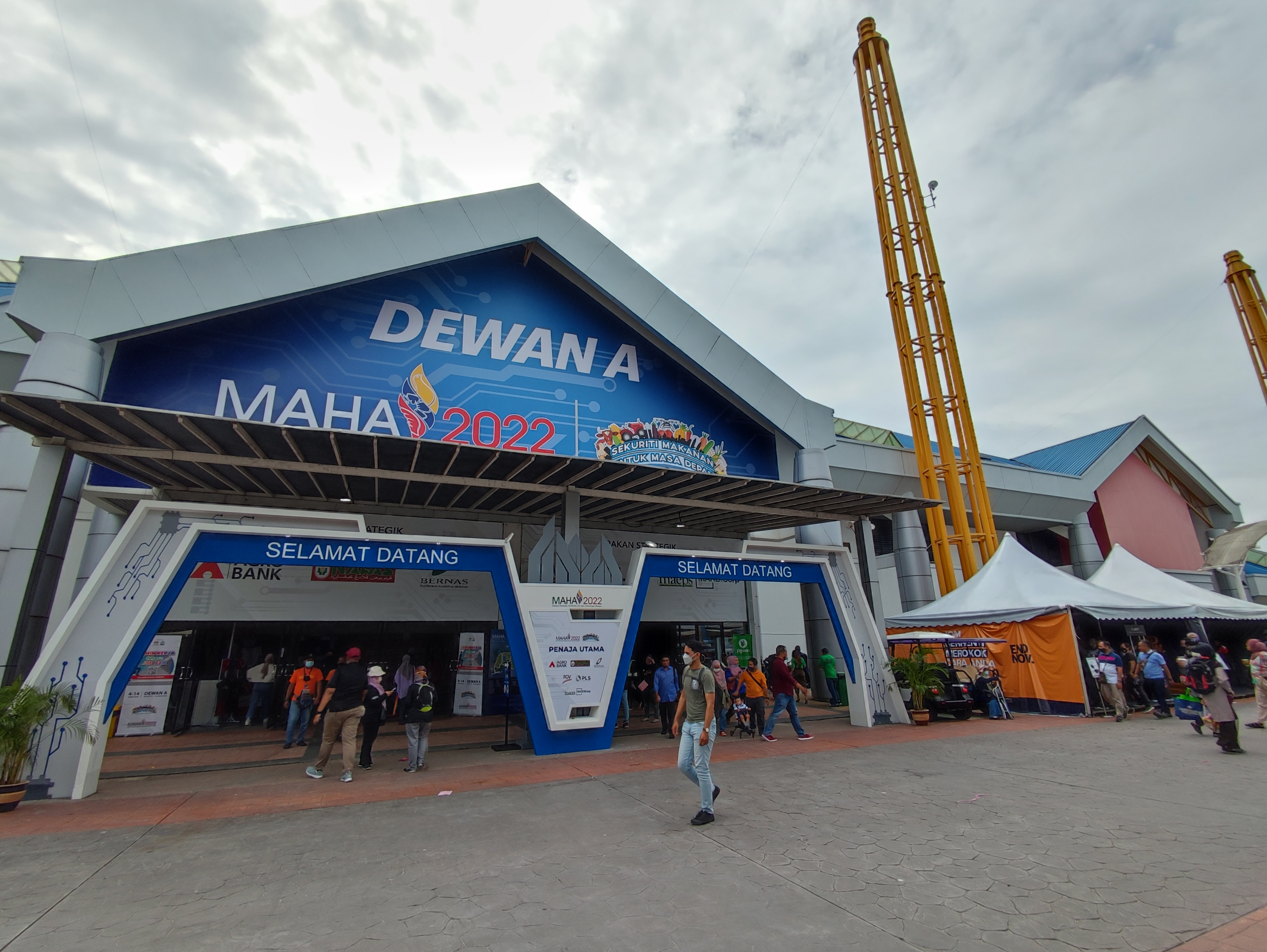
Hall A

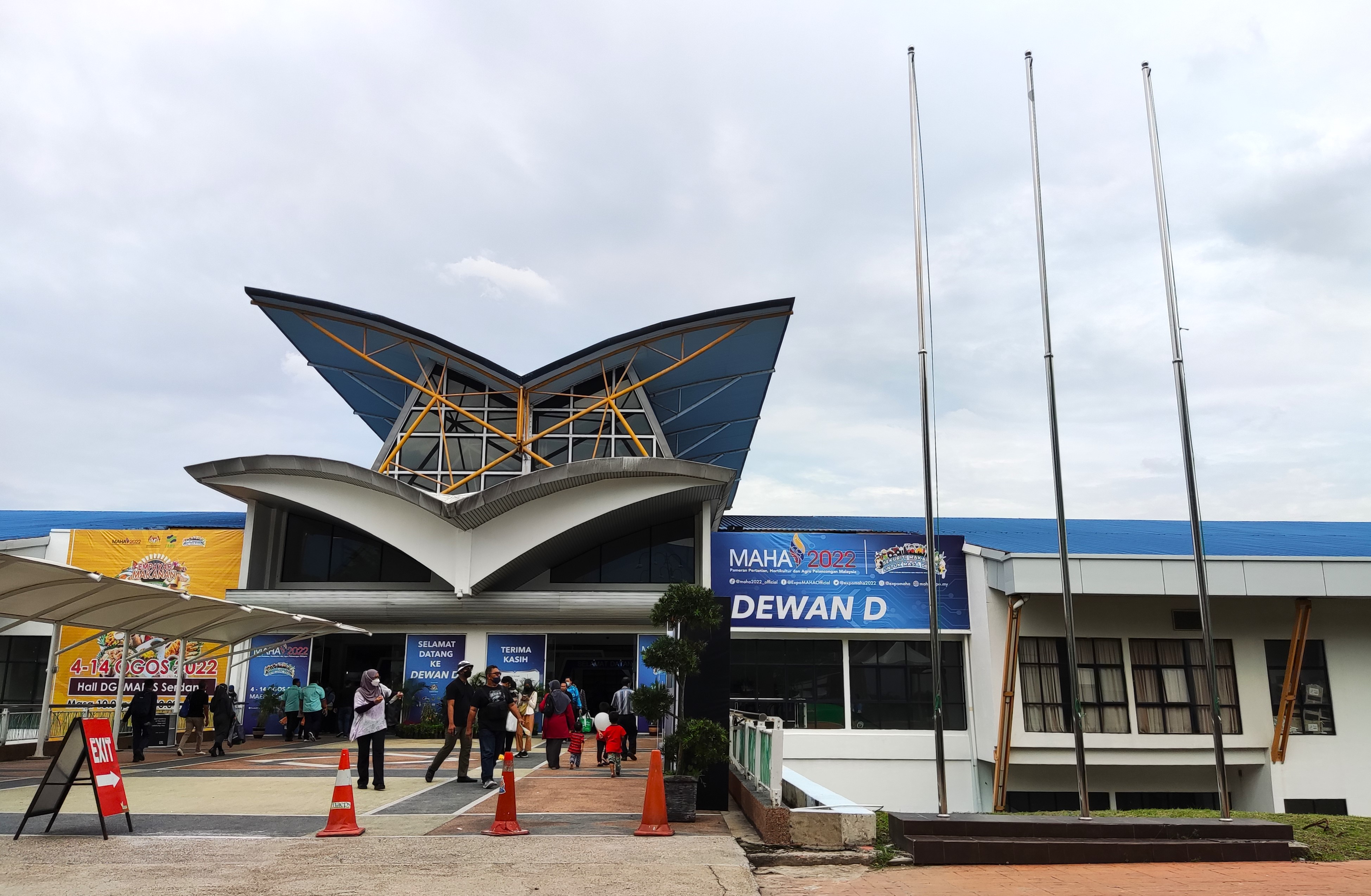
Hall D

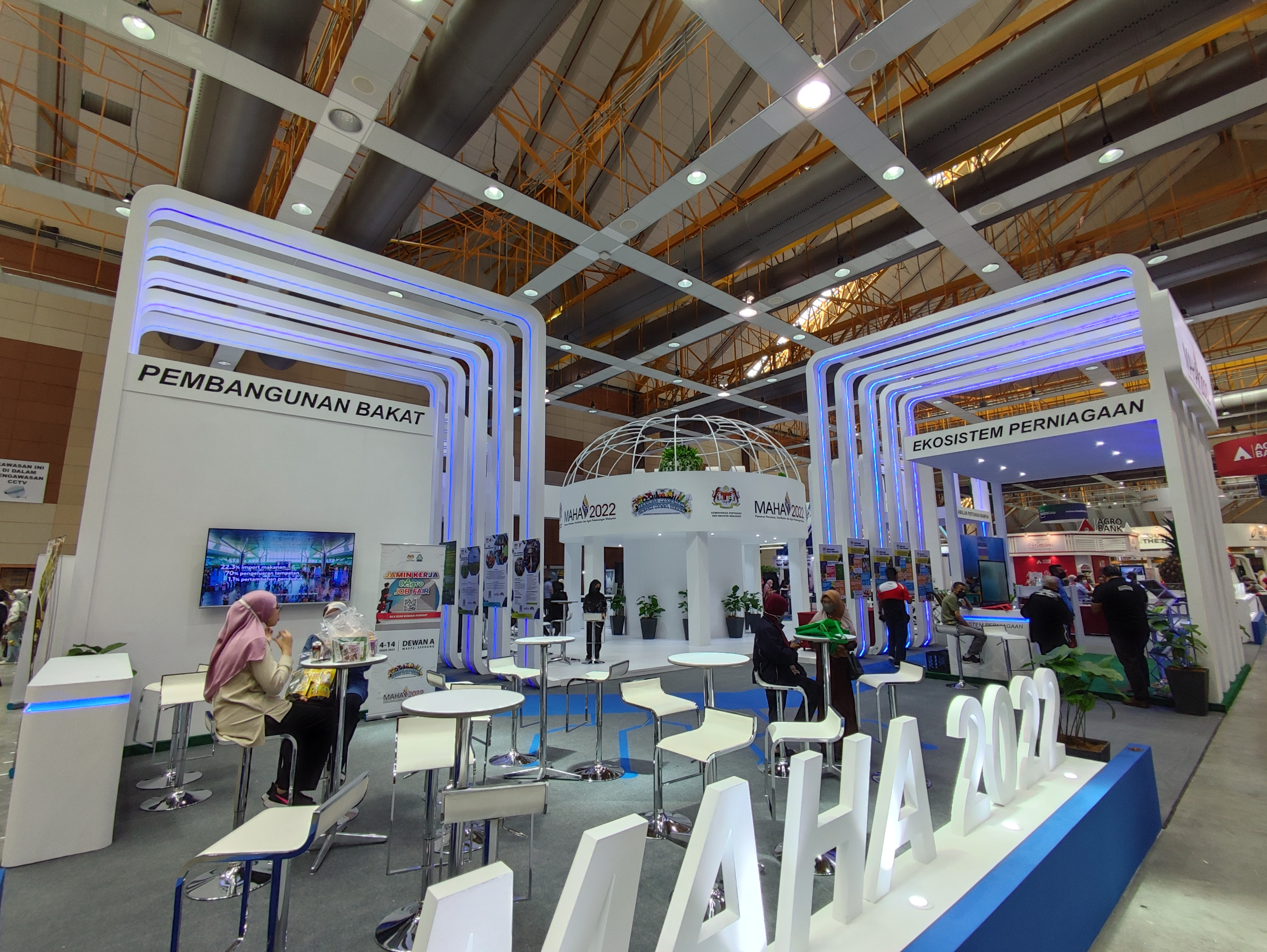
Booth of MAFI in MAHA 2022
