= Tanjong Duabelas =

Human settlement in Malaysia

Tanjong Duabelas is a mukim (commune/subdistrict) and a small village in Kuala Langat District, Selangor, Malaysia.
