= Sunway Lagoon BRT station =

Bus station in Subang Jaya, Malaysia

Coordinates: 3.070727°N 101.610622°E

SB3 Sunway Lagoon
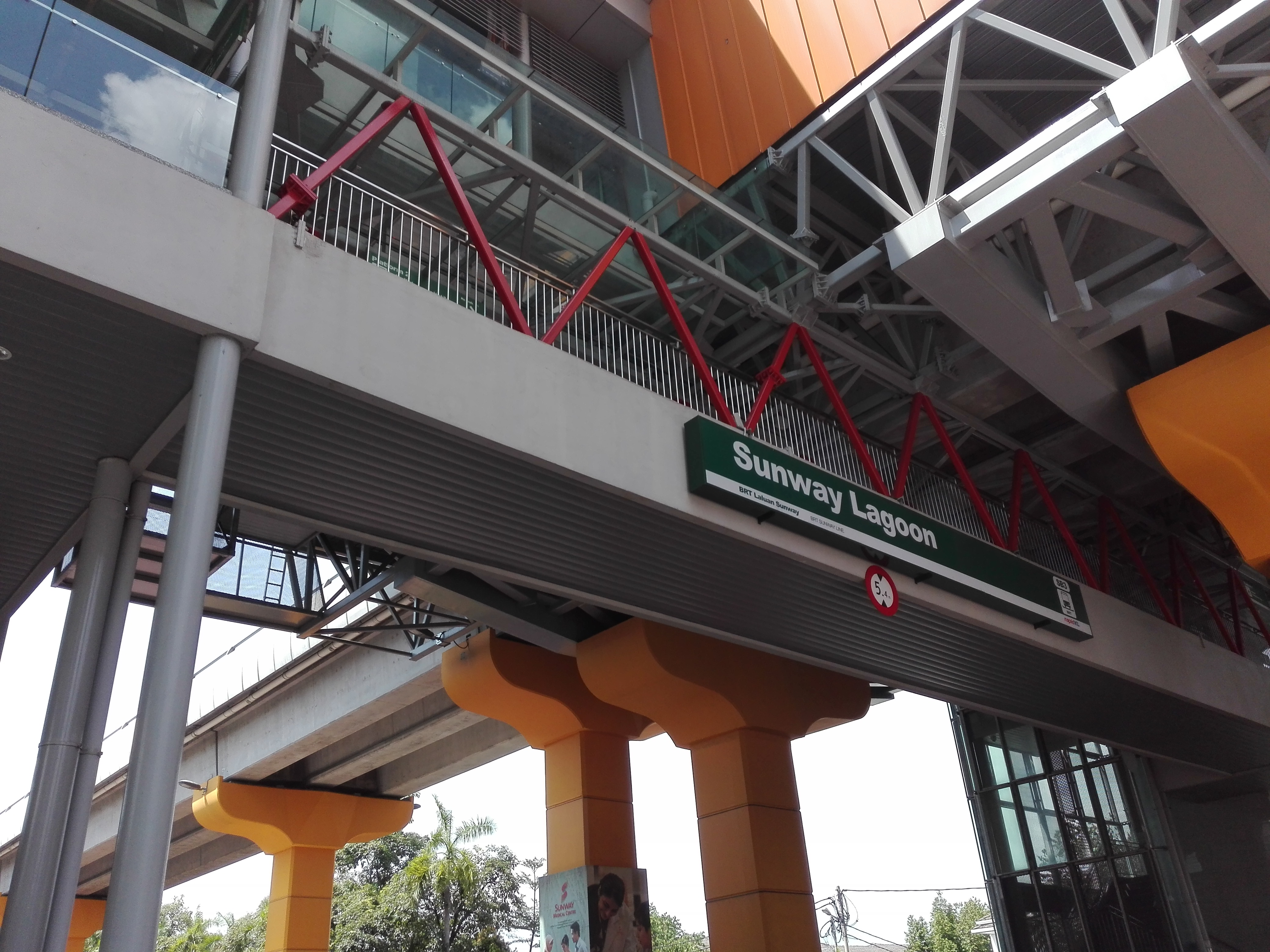
- The road signboard placed under the station

General information
- Other names: Malay: سنوي لݢون (Jawi); Chinese: 双威水上乐园; Tamil: சன்வே லகூன்
- Location: Jalan Lagoon Timur (9/1), Bandar Sunway, 47500 Subang Jaya; Selangor; Malaysia
- System: | BRT station
- Owner: Prasarana Malaysia, Sunway Group
- Platforms: 2 side platforms
- Bus routes: B1 BRT Sunway Line
- Bus operators: Rapid Bus

Construction
- Structure type: Elevated
- Parking: Not available

Other information
- Station code: SB3

History
- Opened: 2 June 2015

Services
Preceding station		Following station
SunMed towards USJ 7	BRT Sunway Line	Mentari towards Sunway-Setia Jaya
Location

Sunway Lagoon is a bus rapid transit station in Bandar Sunway, Subang Jaya, Selangor, Malaysia on the BRT Sunway Line. Like other stations, this station is elevated. However, it is painted differently, in orange, to fit in with the surroundings.

The station is located nearby and connected to the water theme park, Sunway Lagoon which it is named after, and Sunway Pyramid, a shopping mall, both of which are connected through a 300-meter skyway. The station is also surrounded by hotels and shoplots. The station helps to serve this area.

== Gallery ==
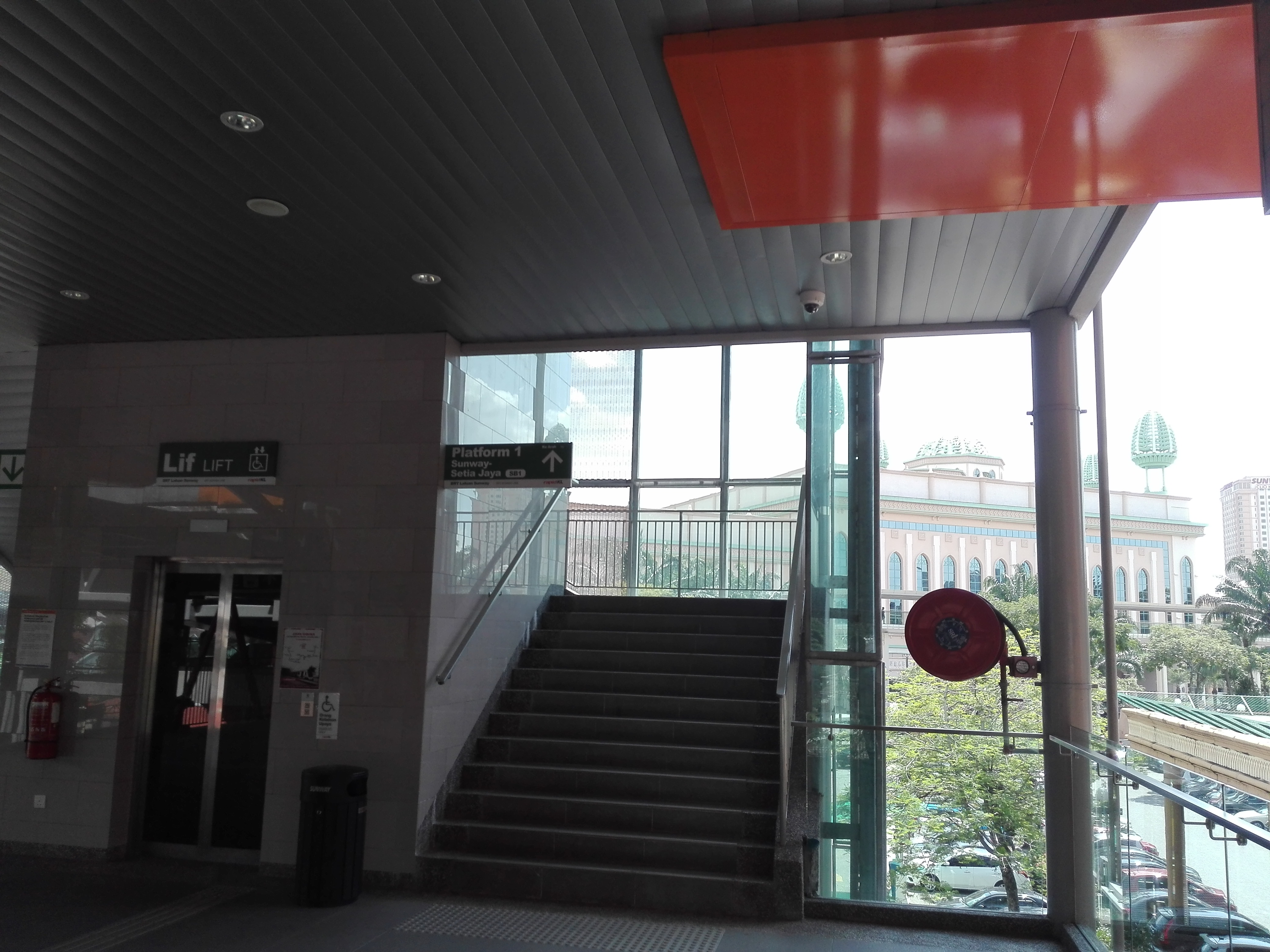
Staircase and a lift to the station. All of the BRT stations are OKU-friendly. Sunway Lagoon can be seen in the background.

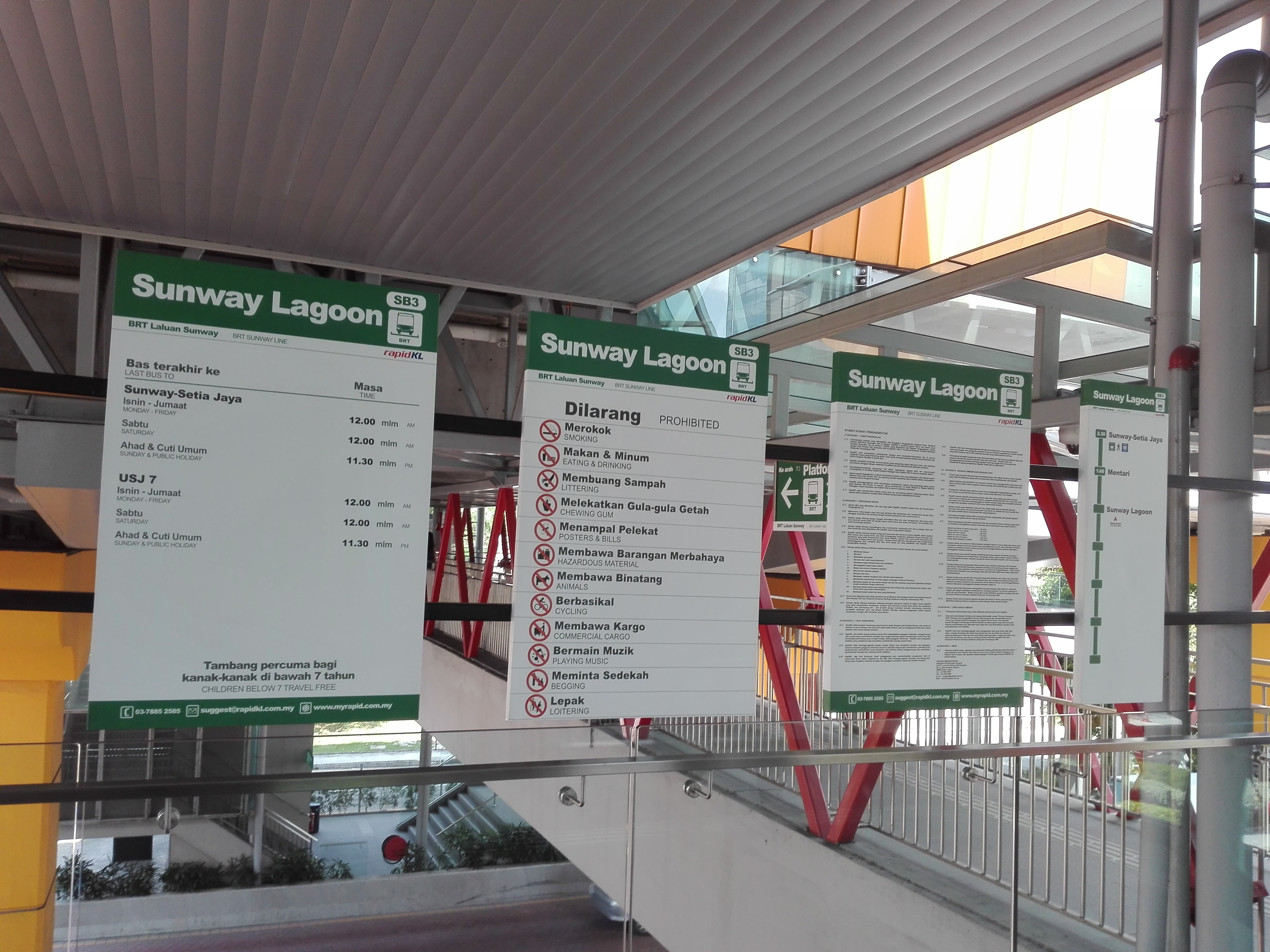
The information signage at the station

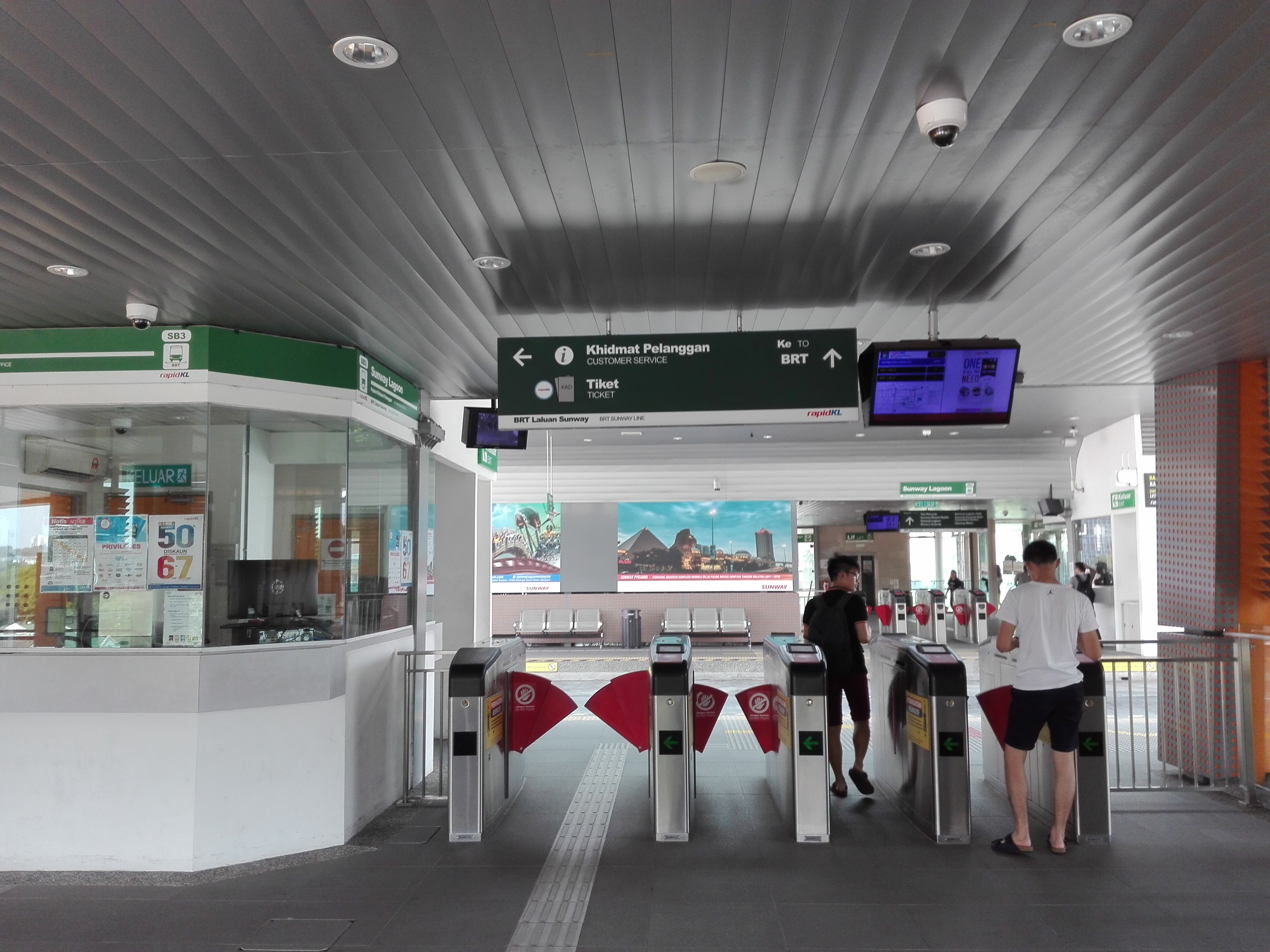
Faregates at the BRT station

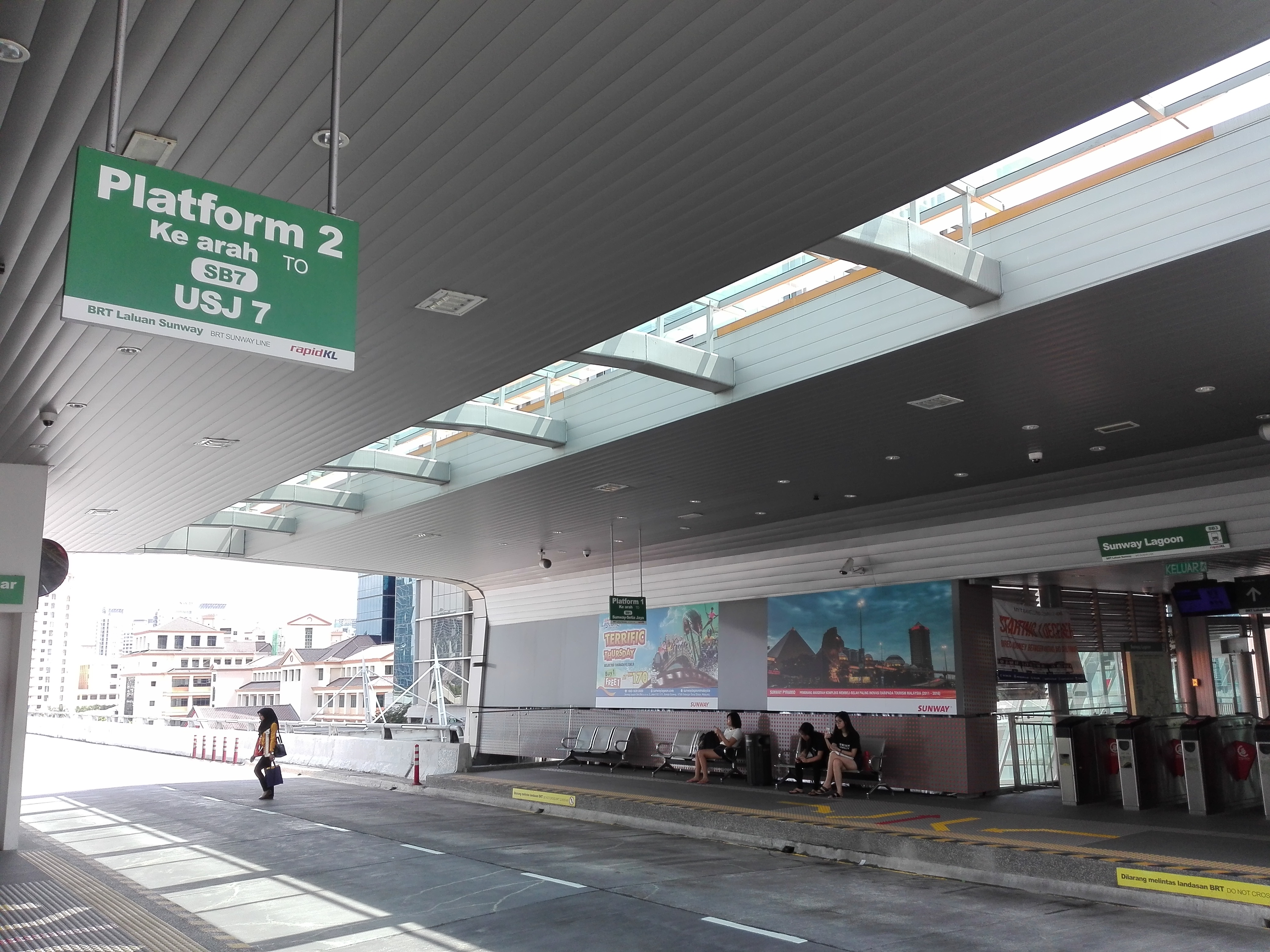
The platform of the BRT station. People are not allowed to walk through the road to the other platform.
