= SunU-Monash BRT station =

Bus station in Subang Jaya, Malaysia

Coordinates: 3.065329°N 101.601527°E

SB5 SunU-Monash

General information
- Other names: Malay: سن يو-موناش (Jawi); Chinese: 双威大学－蒙纳士; Tamil: சன்யூ-மொனாஷ்
- Location: Jalan Lagoon Selatan, Bandar Sunway, 47500 Subang Jaya, Selangor
- System: | BRT station
- Owner: Prasarana Malaysia
- Operator: Rapid Bus
- Line: B1 BRT Sunway Line
- Platforms: 2 side platforms

Construction
- Structure type: Elevated
- Parking: Available with payment

Other information
- Station code: SB5

History
- Opened: 2 June 2015

Services
Preceding station		Following station
South Quay-USJ 1 towards USJ 7	BRT Sunway Line	SunMed towards Sunway-Setia Jaya
Location

The SunU-Monash BRT station is located in Bandar Sunway, Subang Jaya, Selangor and is served by the BRT Sunway Line.

The station is located besides the Monash University Malaysia Campus and nearby Sunway University; both universities which this station is named after and serves. The station is also adjacent to SunMed BRT station which is on the same road. The station is also located beside the BRT depot, and has a multi-storey parking lot. Like other BRT stations on the line, this BRT station is elevated.

== Gallery ==
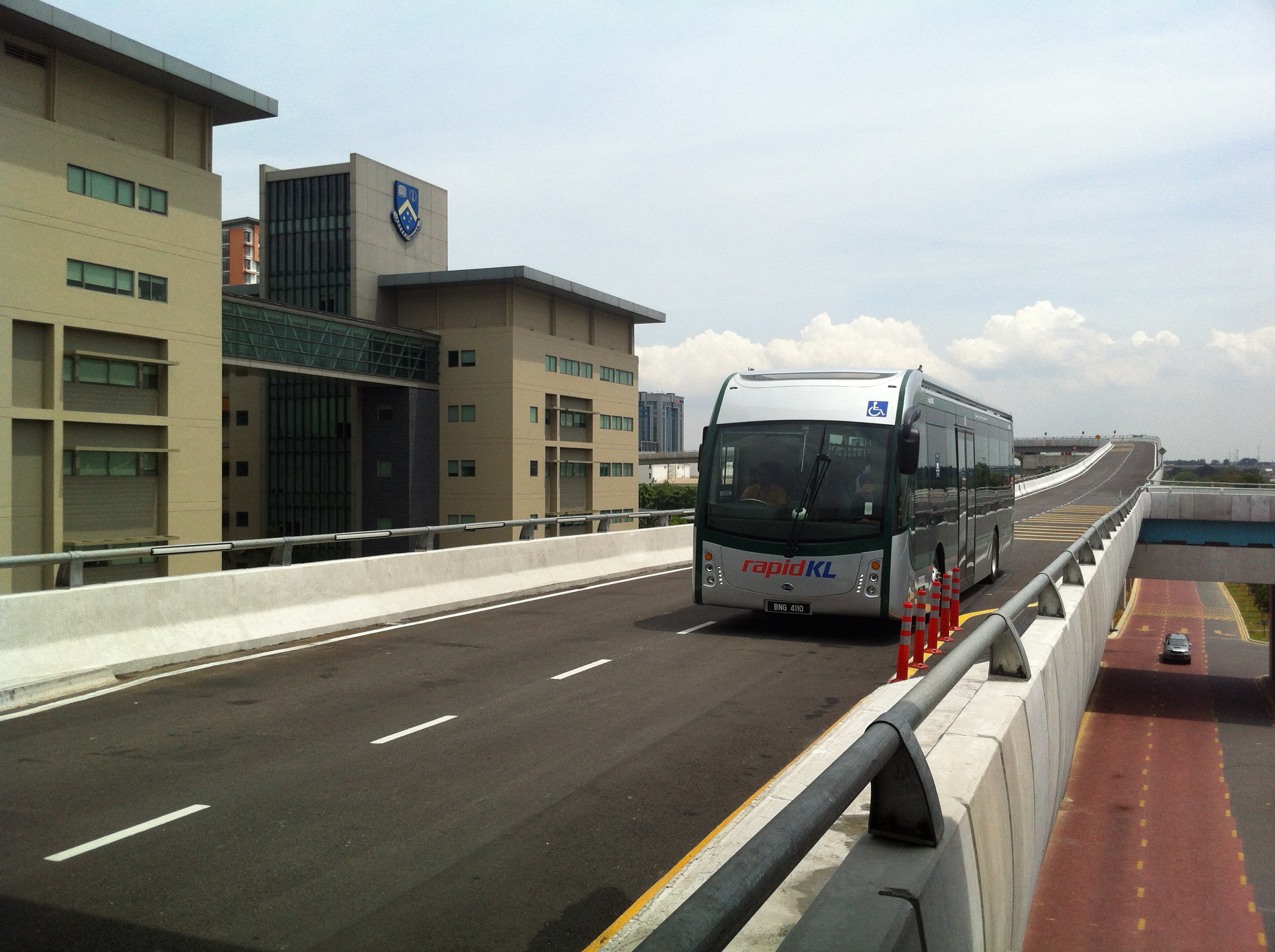
A BRT Sunway Line bus approaching SunU-Monash BRT station. The Monash University campus can be seen.
