= SunMed BRT station =

Bus station in Subang Jaya, Malaysia

Coordinates: 3.065537°N 101.608595°E

SB4 SunMed
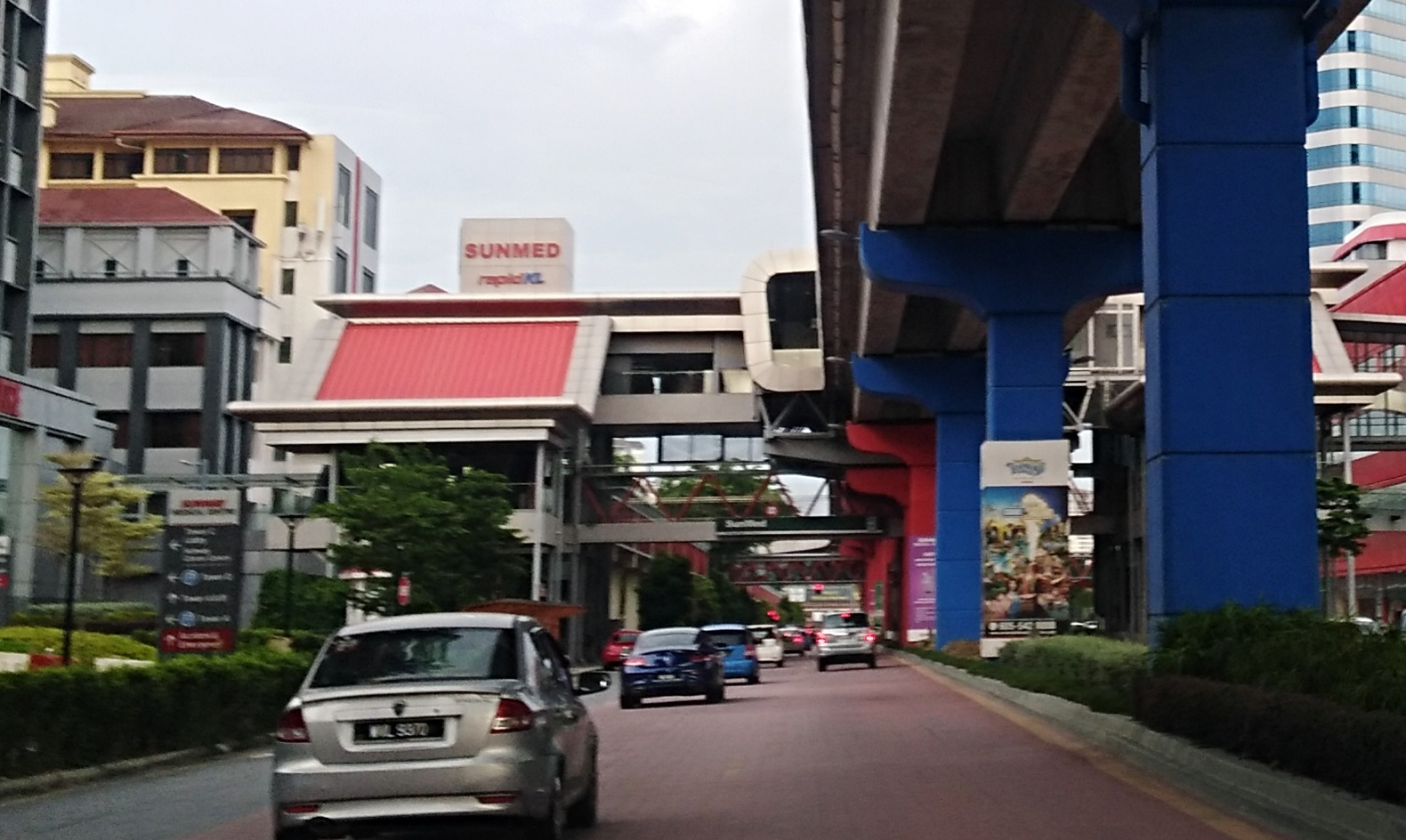
- The road signboard placed under the station

General information
- Other names: Malay: سانميد (Jawi); Chinese: 双威医疗中心; Tamil: சன்மெட்
- Location: 5, Jalan Lagoon Selatan, Bandar Sunway, Subang Jaya; Selangor; Malaysia
- System: | BRT station
- Owner: Prasarana Malaysia
- Platforms: 2 side platforms
- Bus routes: B1 BRT Sunway Line
- Bus operators: Rapid Bus

Construction
- Structure type: Elevated
- Parking: Not available

Other information
- Station code: SB4

History
- Opened: 2 June 2015

Services
Preceding station		Following station
SunU-Monash towards USJ 7	BRT Sunway Line	Sunway Lagoon towards Sunway-Setia Jaya
Location

The SunMed BRT station is located on Jalan Lagoon Selatan, Bandar Sunway, Subang Jaya, Selangor, Malaysia, and is served by the BRT Sunway Line. Like other BRT stations on this line, it is elevated.

The station is located beside Sunway Medical Centre, and is connected to Taylor's University through an 800-metre (2,600 ft) skyway. The station serves both of the institutions.

== Gallery ==
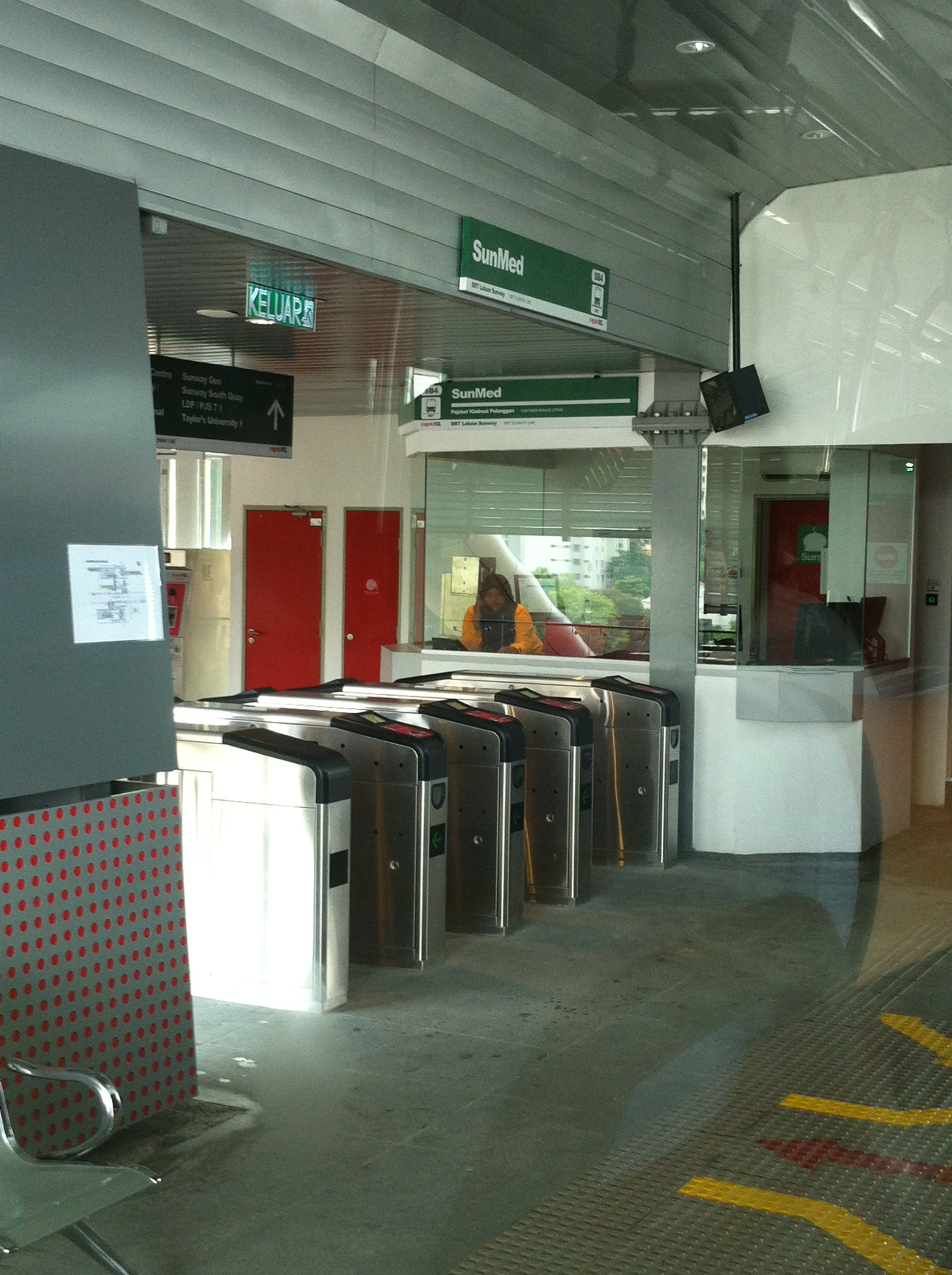
The faregates at SunMed BRT station
