= BRT Sunway Line =

Bus line in Petaling Jaya, Malaysia

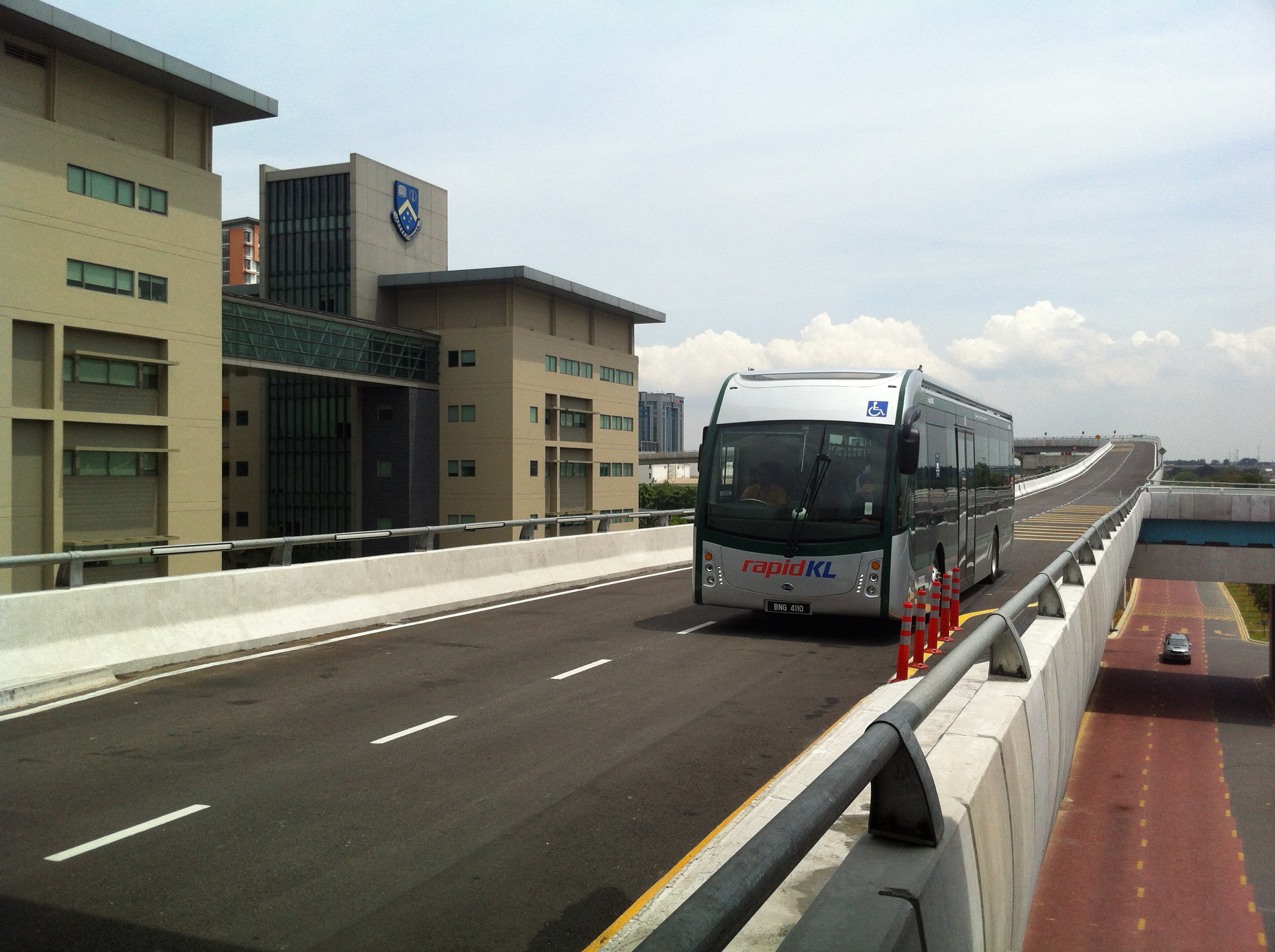
- BYD battery-powered electric bus approaching SunU-Monash station

Overview
- Native name: BRT Laluan Sunway
- Status: Operational
- Owner: Prasarana Malaysia
- Line number: B1 (dark green)
- Locale: Bandar Sunway
- Termini: SB1 Sunway-Setia Jaya; SB7 USJ 7
- Stations: 7
- Website: myrapid.com.my

Service
- Type: Elevated bus rapid transit
- System: Rapid KL; Klang Valley Integrated Transit System
- Services: Sunway-Setia Jaya – USJ 7
- Operator: Rapid Bus
- Daily ridership: 21,693 (2025) (▲17.0%)
- Ridership: 6.71 million (2025) (▲15.0%)

History
- Opened: 2 June 2015; 11 years ago

Technical
- Line length: 5.4 km (3 mi)

Location of BRT Sunway line

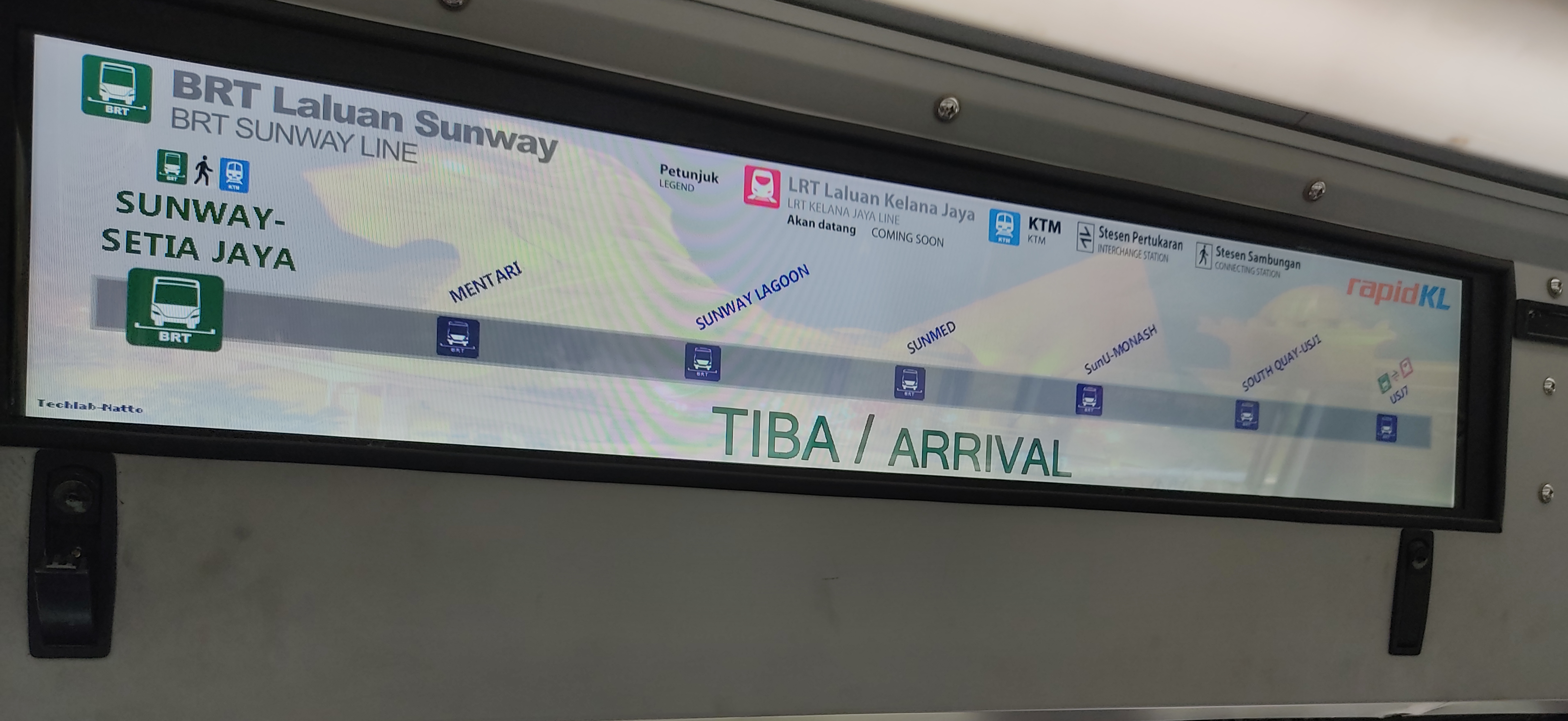
A dynamic route display showing the bus at the current stop.

The BRT Sunway Line is a bus rapid transit (BRT) line that is part of the Klang Valley Integrated Transit System servicing the southeastern suburbs of Petaling Jaya, Malaysia. It is the world's first all-electric Bus Rapid Transit system.

This line is operated by Rapid Bus and was introduced in 2015 to service the high-density areas of Bandar Sunway and Subang Jaya, replacing an earlier proposal plan for the now defunct Sunway Monorail extension. The BRT line also replaced another earlier plan to extend the KL Monorail Line from KL Sentral to Bandar Sunway via Jalan Klang Lama.

The BRT buses have an exclusive right-of-way on an elevated guideway that is not shared with normal road traffic. This specially-dedicated and grade separated guideway for BRT Sunway Line buses is almost similar to rapid transit elevated railways. However, bus operators other than Rapid Bus, do not have the rights to use it and there is no ramp available from at-grade roads to the elevated guideway.

This closed system is dedicated for a high volume of commuters to avoid congestion. However, this system can only be used along the 5.4 km (3.4 mi) BRT guideway between the Setia Jaya and USJ 7 terminals that allow for passengers' interchange to rail transit.

In August 2026, the Selangor state government announced that it is actively evaluating proposals to expand the existing 5.4 km Sunway Bus Rapid Transit (Sunway BRT) Line into high-density corridors like Puchong, Glenmarie, and Kwasa Damansara.

The BRT system has received Bronze rating by BRT Standard score from Institute for Transportation and Development Policy (ITDP).

== Line information ==
=== Stations ===
Station code	Station name	Images	Interchange station	Notes
SB1	Sunway-Setia Jaya		Terminus. Connecting station with KD08 KTM Tanjung Malim-Port Klang Line.	A footbridge connects the station to KTM's Setia Jaya station
SB2	Mentari			In front of Sunway Mentari Business Park and walking distance to Makmur Apartments on Jalan PJS 8/9.
SB3	Sunway Lagoon			Walking distance to Sunway Lagoon theme park, Sunway Pyramid shopping centre, Menara Sunway, Sunway Pinnacle, Sunway Resort Hotel, Sunway Pyramid Hotel and Sunway Lagoon Hotel
SB4	SunMed			In front of Sunway Medical Centre, Sunway Geo Mall, Sunway Square Mall and connected with Taylor's University through an 800-metre (2,624 ft 8 in) pedestrian walkway.
SB5	SunU-Monash			In front of Monash University Malaysia and connected to Sunway College and Sunway University via an elevated walkway. The BRT Depot and Multilevel Car Park are located beside the station.
SB6	South Quay-USJ 1			Behind Mydin USJ 1. Near Casa Subang Apartment and Impian Meridian.
SB7	USJ 7		Terminus. Interchange station with KJ31 Kelana Jaya Line	

== Fleet ==
In February 2014, BYD won the bid to supply 15 new battery-run electric bus for Prasarana Malaysia. The buses use a lithium iron phosphate battery - which are non-toxic and have increased fire safety, in-wheel hub motors and regenerative braking. There are no caustic materials contained in the battery and no toxic electrolytes or heavy metals and the battery can be completely recycled. The source said that the buses are very quiet and ensures a comfortable ride without vibrations, jerks or noise associated with the conventional buses and combustion engines. The bus can also drive for more than 250 kilometres (160 mi) even in heavy city traffic on a single charge. In September 2022, a driverless bus trial has been started that will run after hours. While initially not carrying any passengers, the aim is to allow for increased efficiency.

Since 2024, the BRT service sometimes uses Rapid KL normal bus fleets like the Scania K250UB and the Higer KLQ6129G for the SH01 BRT Shuttle.

In November 2026, all 15 original BYD K9 units were taken out of service following final retirements and a breakdown incident near the Sunway-Setia Jaya U-turn area on November 11–12, 2026. As a result, Rapid KL has transitioned the line to newer electric bus models, such as the Foton AUV C12 BJ6129EVCA and other supplemental interim buses.

== Other information ==
=== Background ===
Bus rapid transit (BRT) is a transit system that uses dedicated bus lanes, universal access stations, integrated pedestrian access, rapid boarding and high service frequency. It is a fairly new concept in Malaysia although it has been implemented successfully in cities such as Bogotá, Colombia; Jakarta, Indonesia, and Curitiba, Brazil.

BRT Sunway is a public-private partnership project between Prasarana Malaysia and Sunway Group to provide a better and integrated transit service for the residents and commuters of Bandar Sunway and USJ. The line costs RM634 million and is 70% funded by Prasarana Malaysia, 15% by Sunway and the rest by Unit Kerjasama Awam Swasta (UKAS), a facilitation fund. The system uses eco-friendly electric bus services on elevated tracks and connects major areas within the areas such as hospital, commercial areas, shopping centres and universities. The system is expected to provide services for 500,000 residents. The elevated bus lane is said to be the first elevated BRT in Southeast Asia.

=== Features ===
The dedicated elevated busway runs isolated from traffic congestion from the Sunway-Setia Jaya Station, which is located near KTM Komuter's Setia Jaya (linked by covered pedestrian walkways), and ends at the USJ 7 station of the LRT Kelana Jaya Line extension, where there is paid-area integration between the LRT and BRT lines by virtue of the BRT platform sharing the paid area of the concourse of the LRT station.

There are 15 environmentally-friendly buses as they are electrical-powered and travel on a speed of 30 and 40 km/h (19 and 25 mph) on average. The electric buses will not have any gas emission and can operate for 12 hours before the next charging cycle with a range of 250 km (155 mi) or 23 trips per day. The electric buses are designed to look almost like trains.

The BRT stations are built with a modern and contemporary design, which include universal access facilities the disabled community such as tactiles for the blind, ramps as well as low ticket counters. Safety features at the stations consist of closed-circuit TV cameras as well as pedestrian bridges so that commuters can cross from one platform to another with ease. SunU-Monash halt has park-and-ride facilities with a total of 1,153 car parking bays, which includes 102 special bays for lady drivers and 23 for the handicapped group, and another 121 bays for motorcycles.

According to Prasarana, the ridership for the entire line is forecasted to be at 2,400 riders per hour for 2015 and is expected to reach 5,200 people every hour in 2035.

=== Services ===
The BRT service was officially launched to the public on 2 June 2015. Rides on the BRT are free for the first two months beginning 2 June 2015. A flat rate of RM4.00 will be charged at the SunU-Monash station park and ride facility from 2 June to 1 August 2015. The electric buses will be available every four minutes. The ebus service takes around 30 minutes on full loop journey between BRT halts of Sunway-Setia Jaya to USJ 7 round-trip.

The latest fare has been announced on 1 December 2018 as:

Station	Sunway-Setia Jaya	Mentari	Sunway Lagoon	SunMed	SunU Monash	South Quay	USJ 7
Sunway-Setia Jaya	RM 0.90	RM 1.30	RM 1.80	RM 2.40	RM 2.90	RM 3.60	RM 4.30
Mentari	RM 1.30	RM 0.90	RM 1.30	RM 1.80	RM 2.40	RM 3.10	RM 3.80
Sunway Lagoon	RM 1.80	RM 1.30	RM 0.90	RM 1.40	RM 1.80	RM 2.60	RM 3.20
SunMed	RM 2.40	RM 1.80	RM 1.40	RM 0.90	RM 1.30	RM 2.00	RM 2.60
SunU Monash	RM 2.90	RM 2.40	RM 1.90	RM 1.30	RM 0.90	RM 1.40	RM 2.20
South Quay	RM 3.60	RM 3.10	RM 2.60	RM 2.00	RM 1.40	RM 0.90	RM 1.40
USJ 7	RM 4.30	RM 3.80	RM 3.20	RM 2.60	RM 2.20	RM 1.40	RM 0.80

== Ridership ==
BRT Sunway Line Ridership
Year	Ridership	Change (%)	Remarks
2026	6,493,290		As of October 2026
2025	6,711,597	▲15	
2024	5,835,458	▲14.7	
2023	5,087,921	▲40.7	
2022	3,615,899	▲179.4	
2021	1,293,943	▼ -40.7	Total lockdown
2020	2,182,299	▼ -51.1	COVID-19 pandemic
2019	4,461,096	▲23.8	
2018	3,603,510	▲56.1	
2017	2,307,838	-	

== Criticism ==
=== Affordability ===
Since the new fare was announced in August 2015, the BRT Sunway Line has been heavily criticised by passengers for its steep and unaffordable prices compared with other public transport services operated by Prasarana. For instance, travelling on the BRT from one end to another (USJ 7 to / from Sunway-Setia Jaya) would cost passengers RM5.40 (cashless ticket), traversing 5.4 km (3.4 mi) in distance. In comparison, for a similar fare, one would be able to travel from USJ 7 to Gombak on the Kelana Jaya Line, covering a distance of more than 30 km (19 mi). The National Public Transport Users Association (4PAM) went as far as to call the rates "shocking".

It has been reported that 13,000 people rode the BRT when it was free during its initial months in June and July 2015, but the number of passengers has since drastically number declined to 4,000 when the fare was introduced.

However, Prasarana has repeatedly maintained that its fare is relatively low, given the high maintenance and initial cost involved, in addition to various cashless payment options available with discounted fares.

== Gallery ==
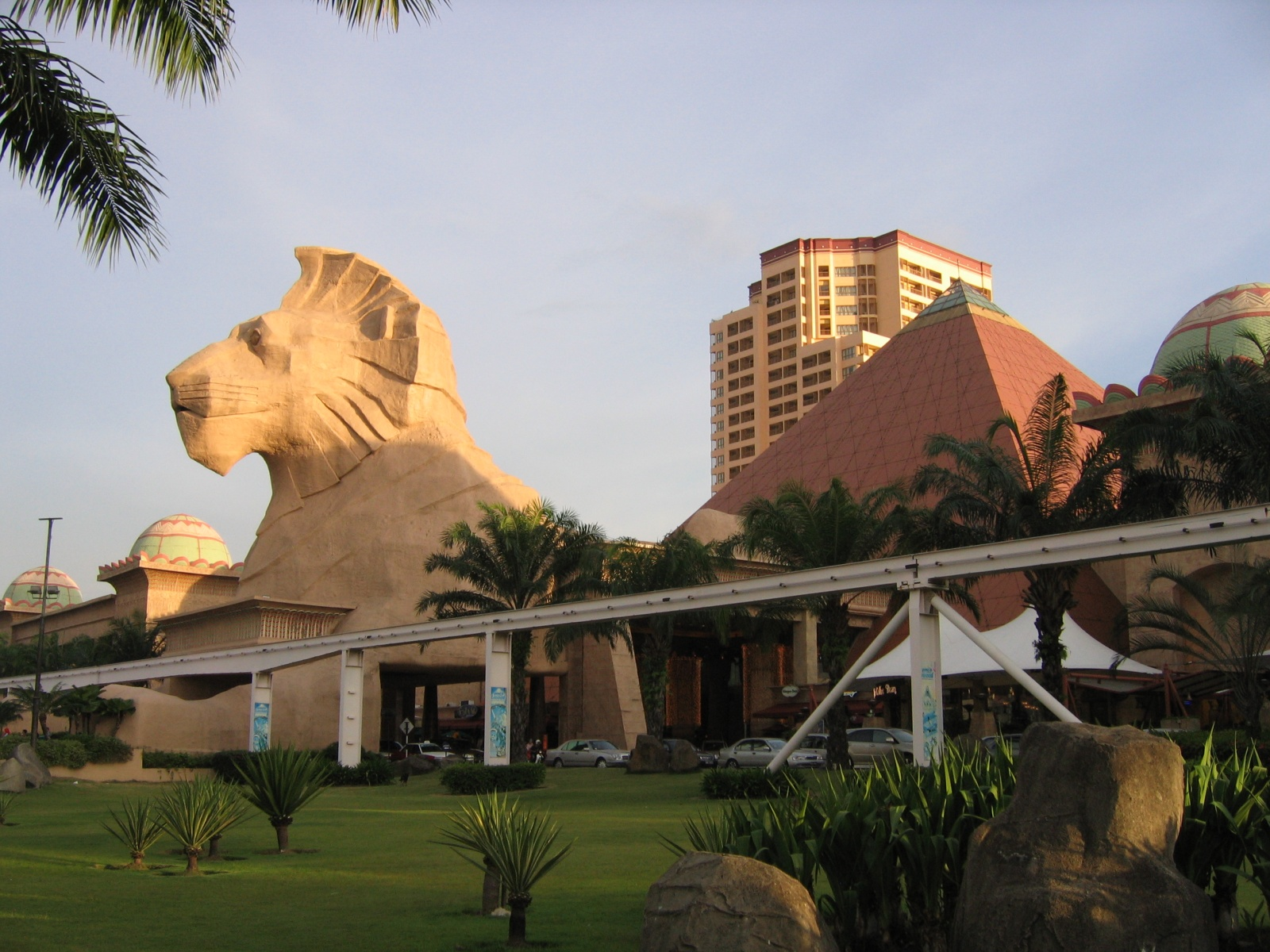
Sunway Pyramid is one BRT Sunway Line route. Photo showed the defunct Sunway Monorail 3 km steel-tracked loop system.

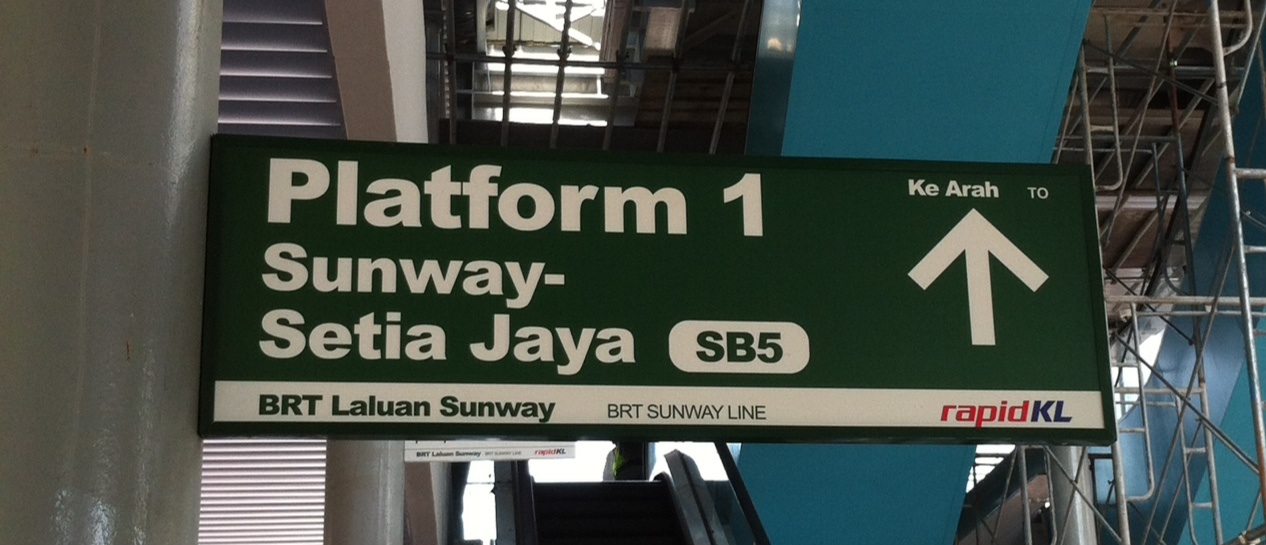
Platform 1 signage at SB5 SunU-Monash station towards SB1 Sunway-Setia Jaya station.

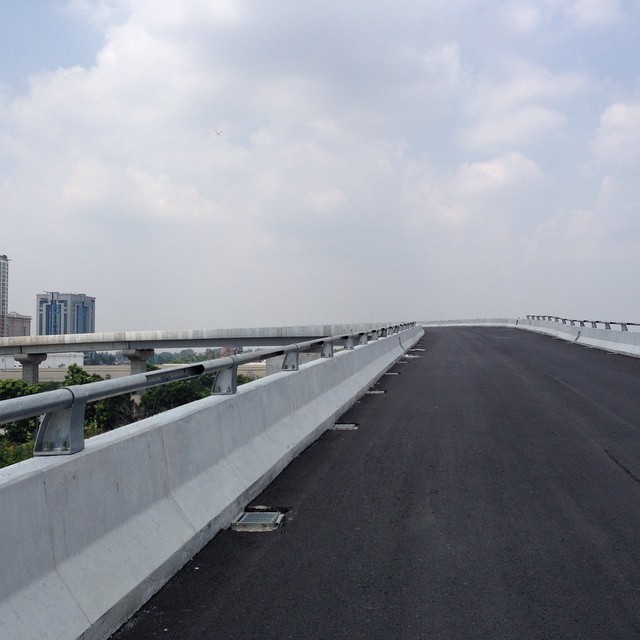
BRT Sunway Line elevated busway

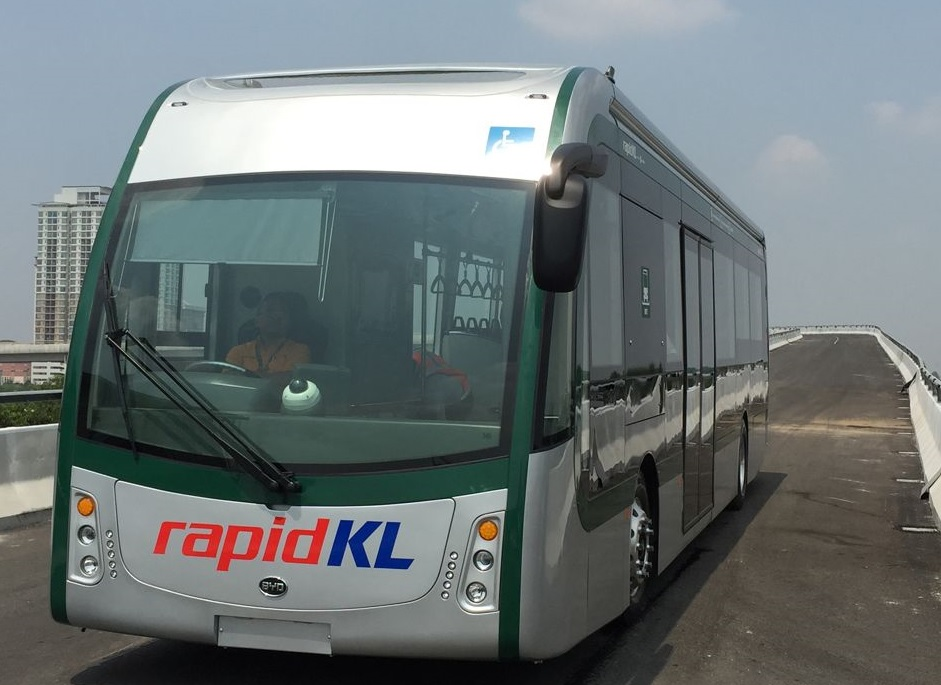
A BYD battery-run electric bus on dedicated elevated busway.

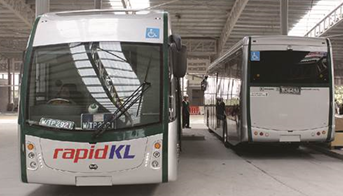
Rapid Bus's battery-run electric bus for BRT Sunway Line at Sunway Depot

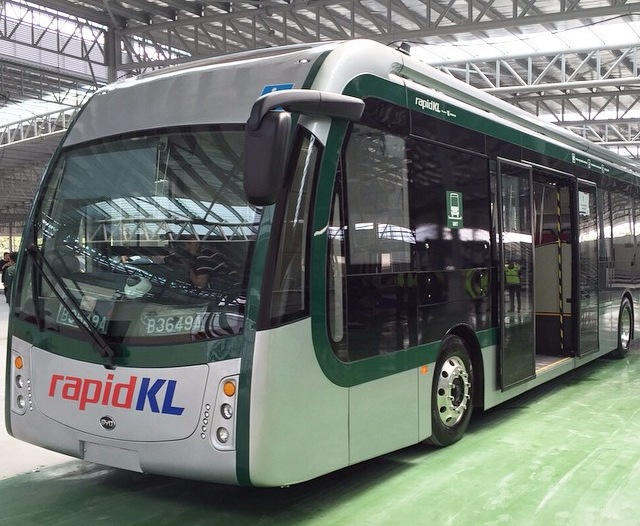
Rapid Bus's battery-run electric bus at BRT Depot

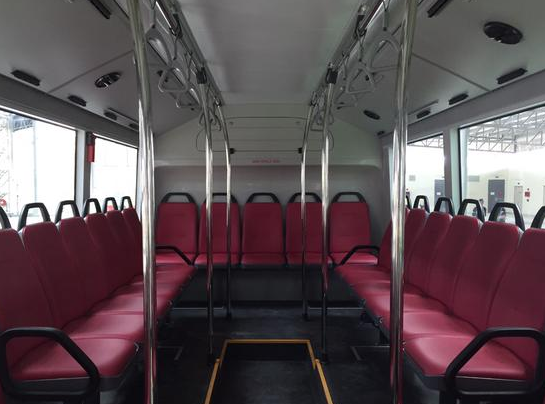
Rapid Bus's battery-run electric bus interior for BRT Sunway Line

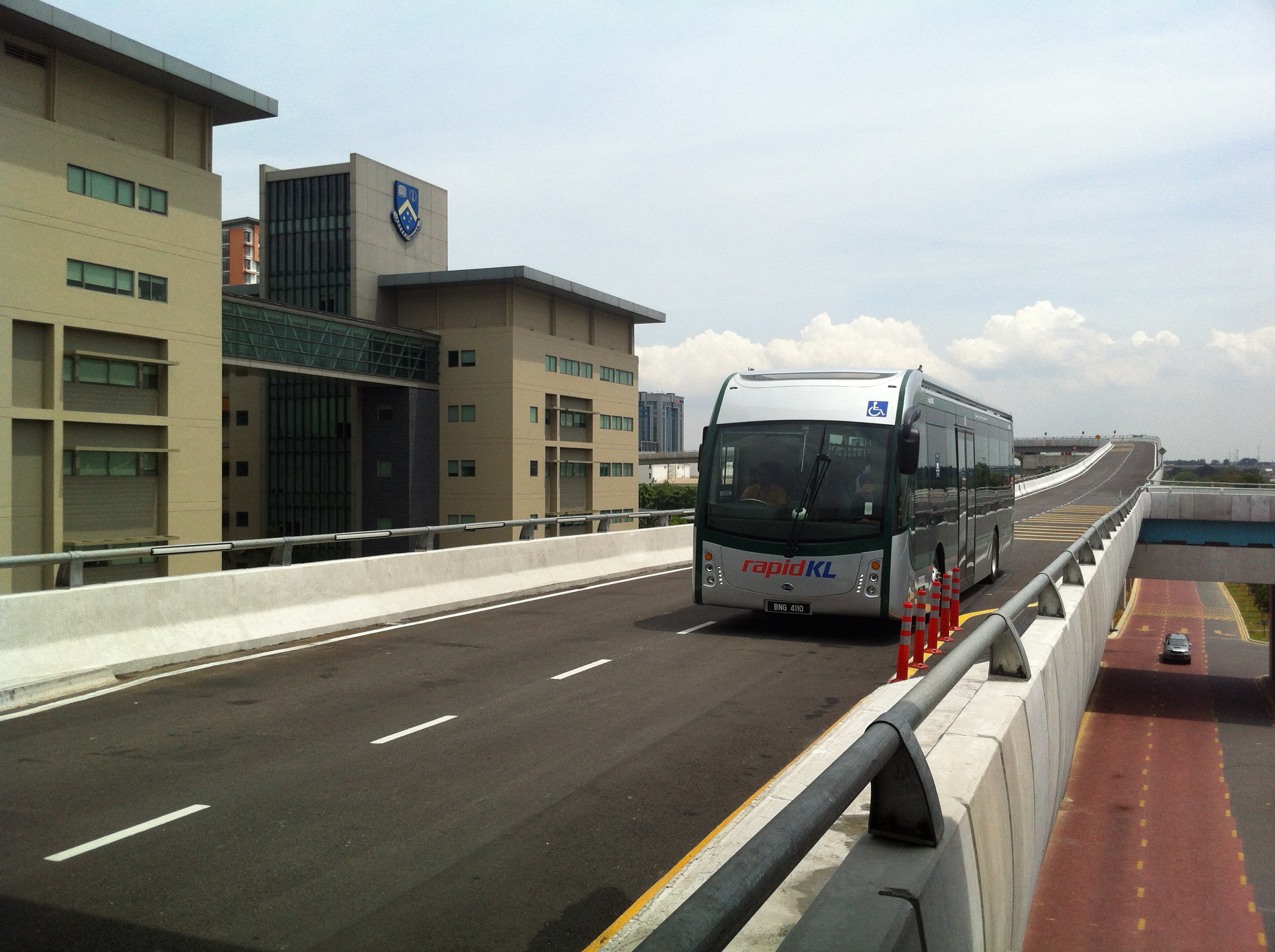
BRT Sunway ebus approaching SunU-Monash halt.

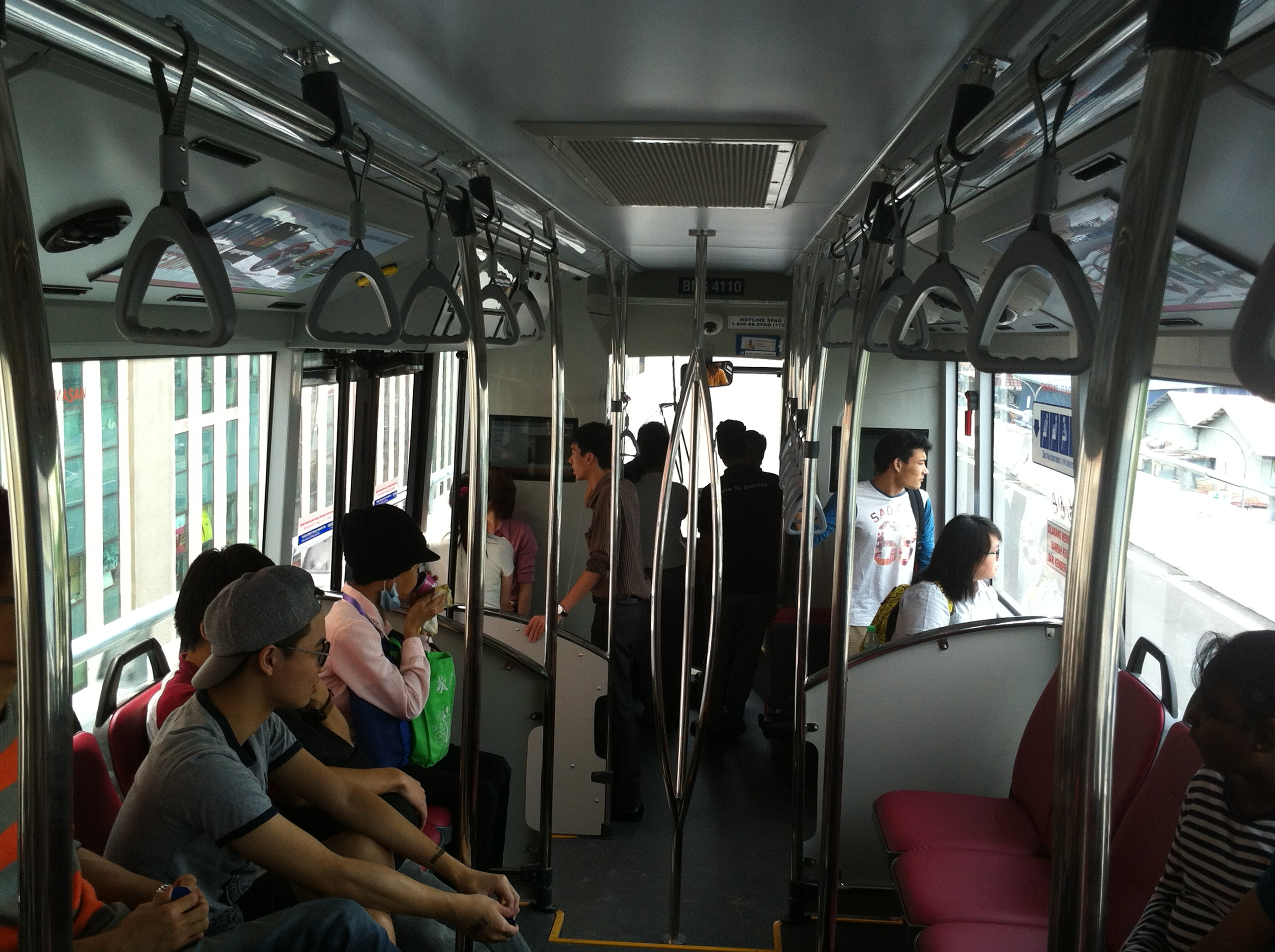
The BRT Sunway ebus interior on operation.

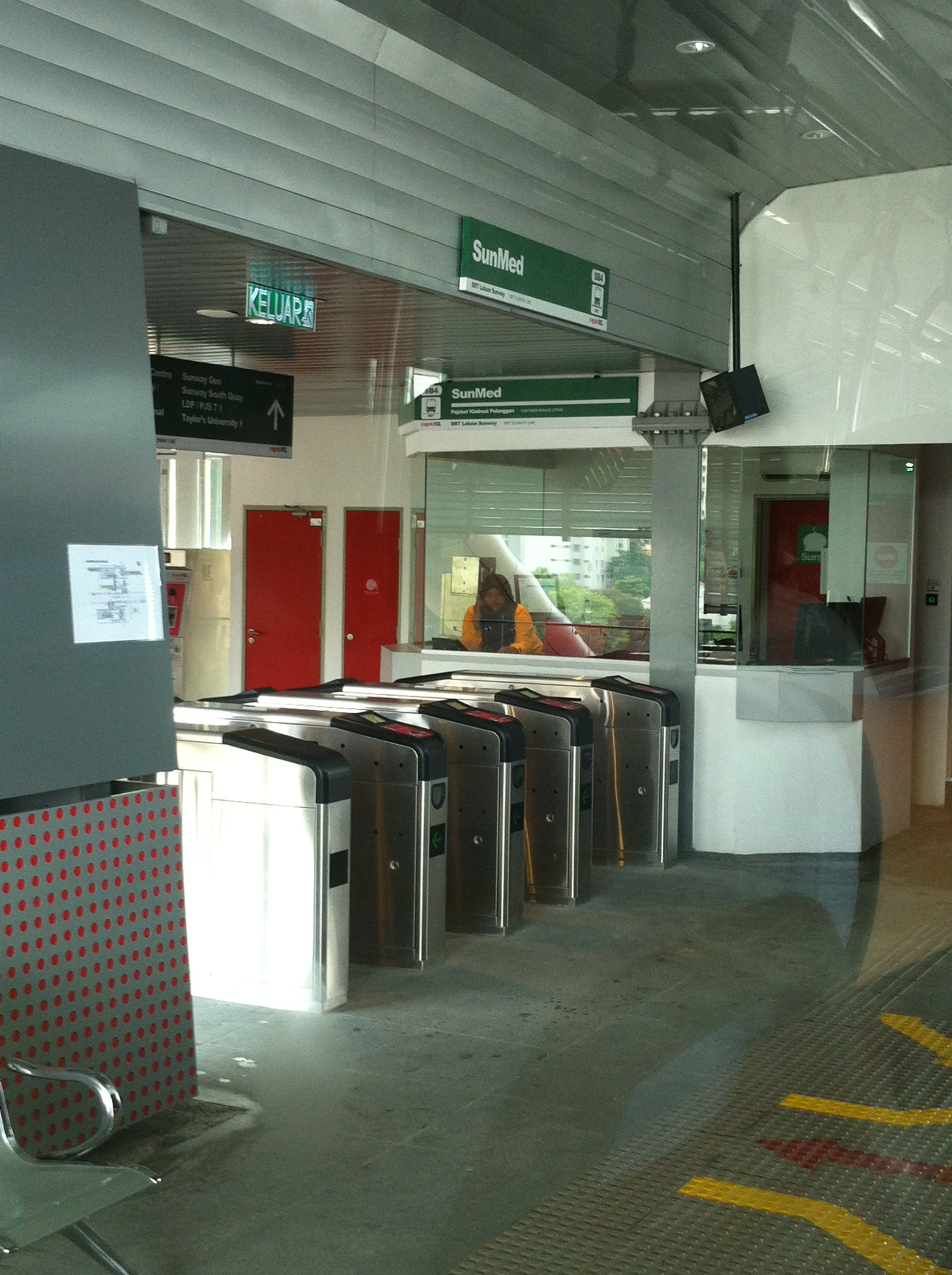
The BRT SunMed halt is identical to all 6 halts.

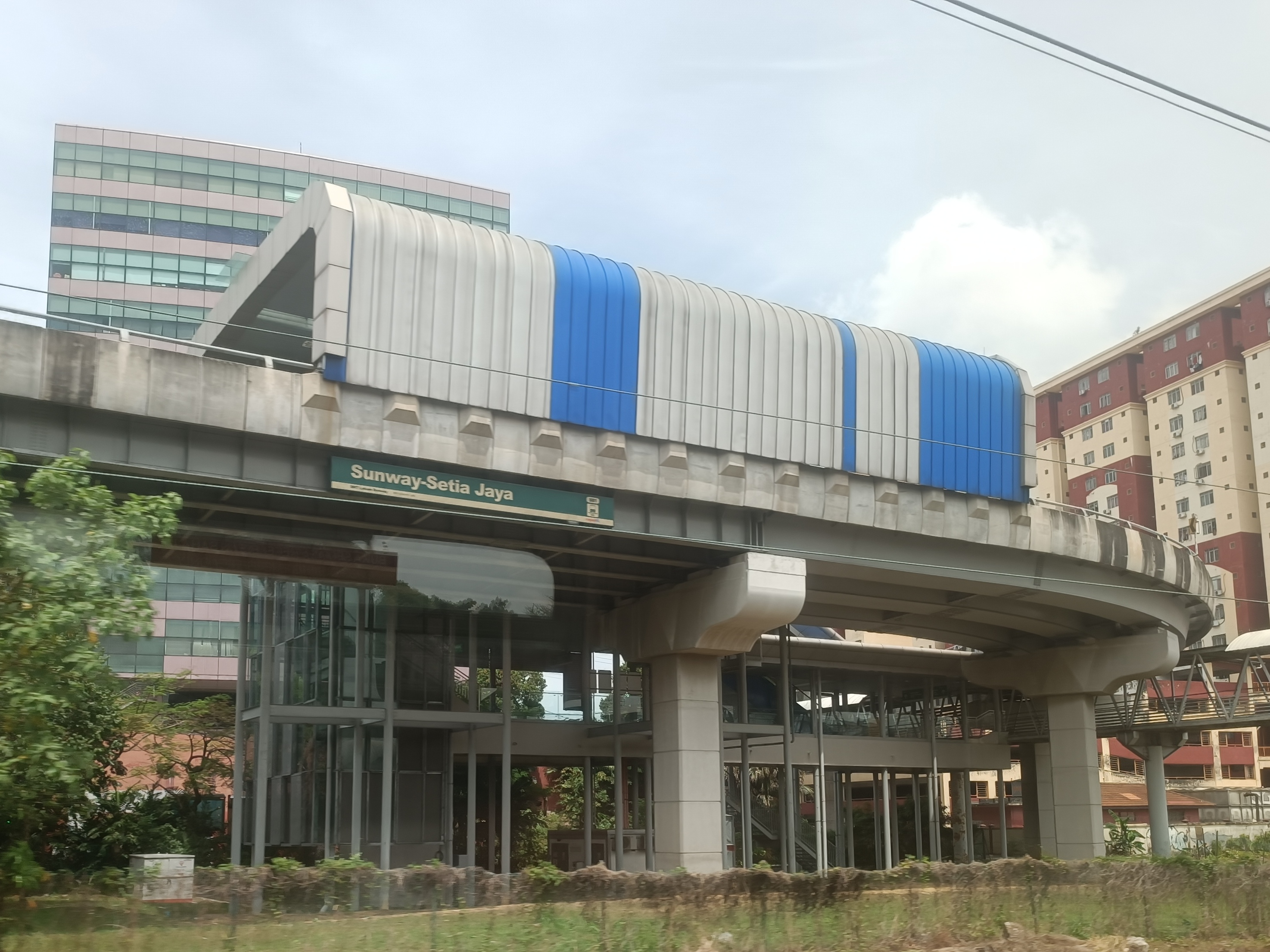
The BRT Sunway-Setia Jaya halt is identical to all 6 halts.

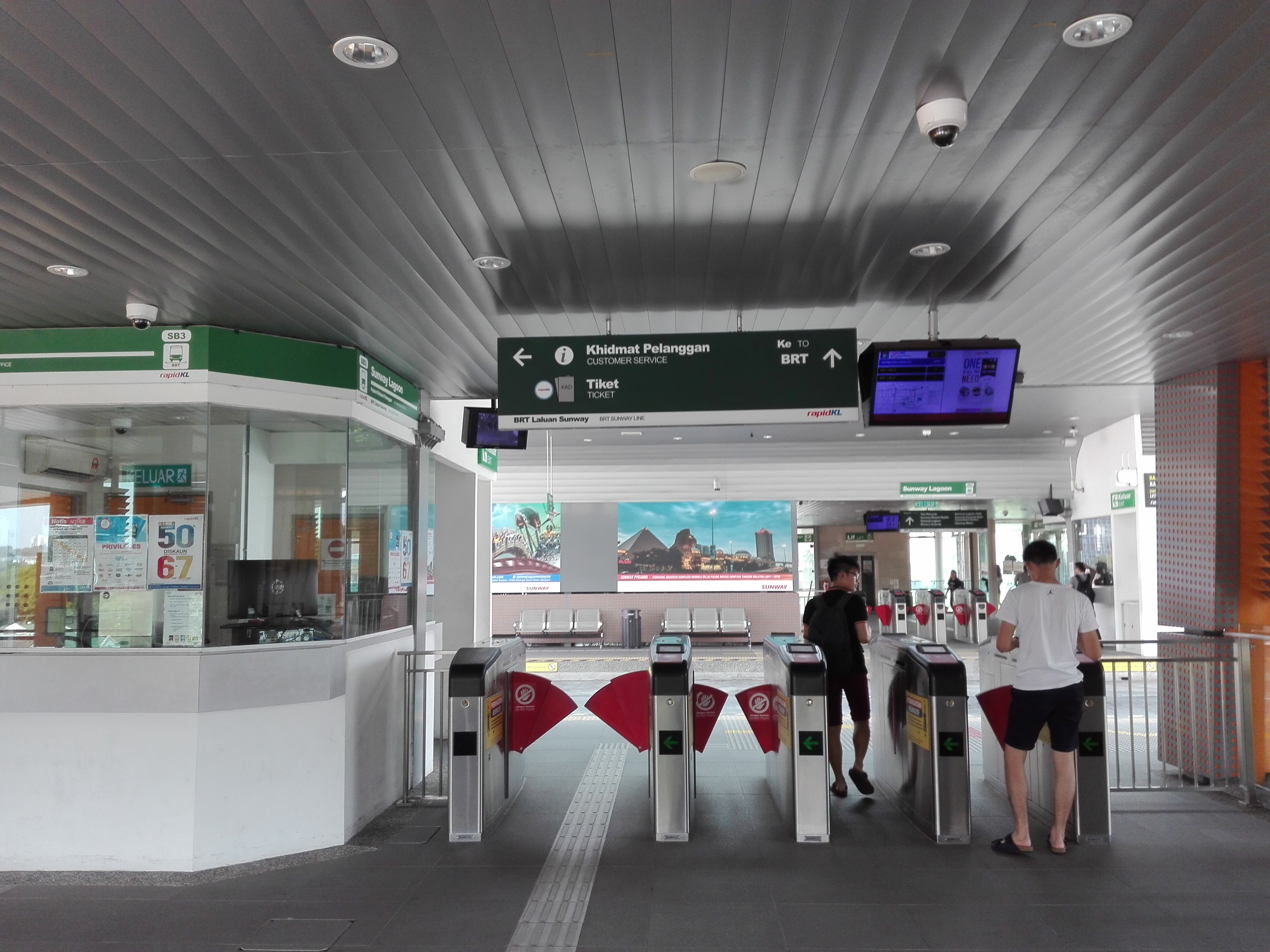
Faregates of Sunway Lagoon BRT.

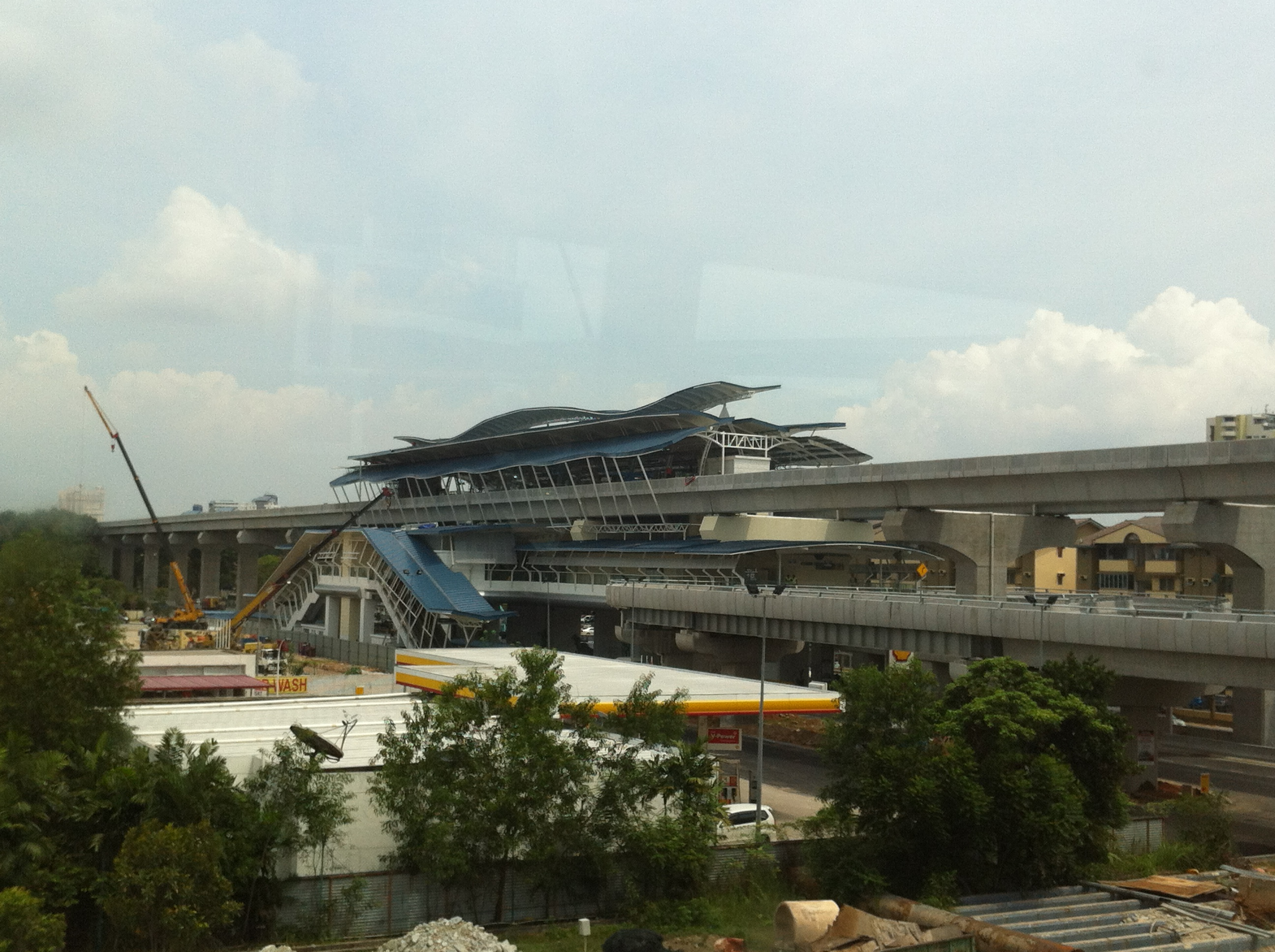
The BRT USJ 7 halt and Kelana Jaya Line station.

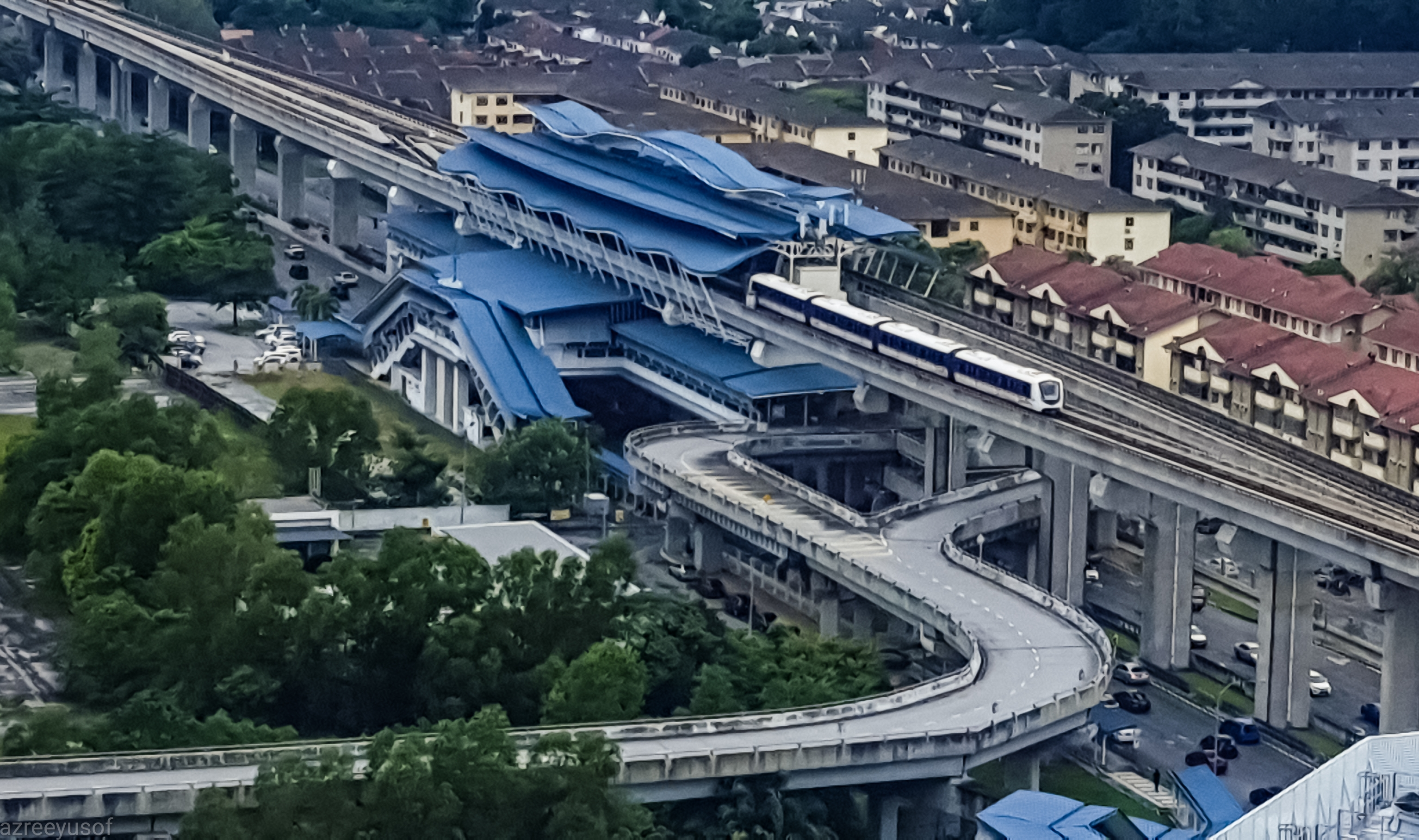
An aerial view of the USJ 7 LRT Station, with the Sunway BRT Line beneath it.

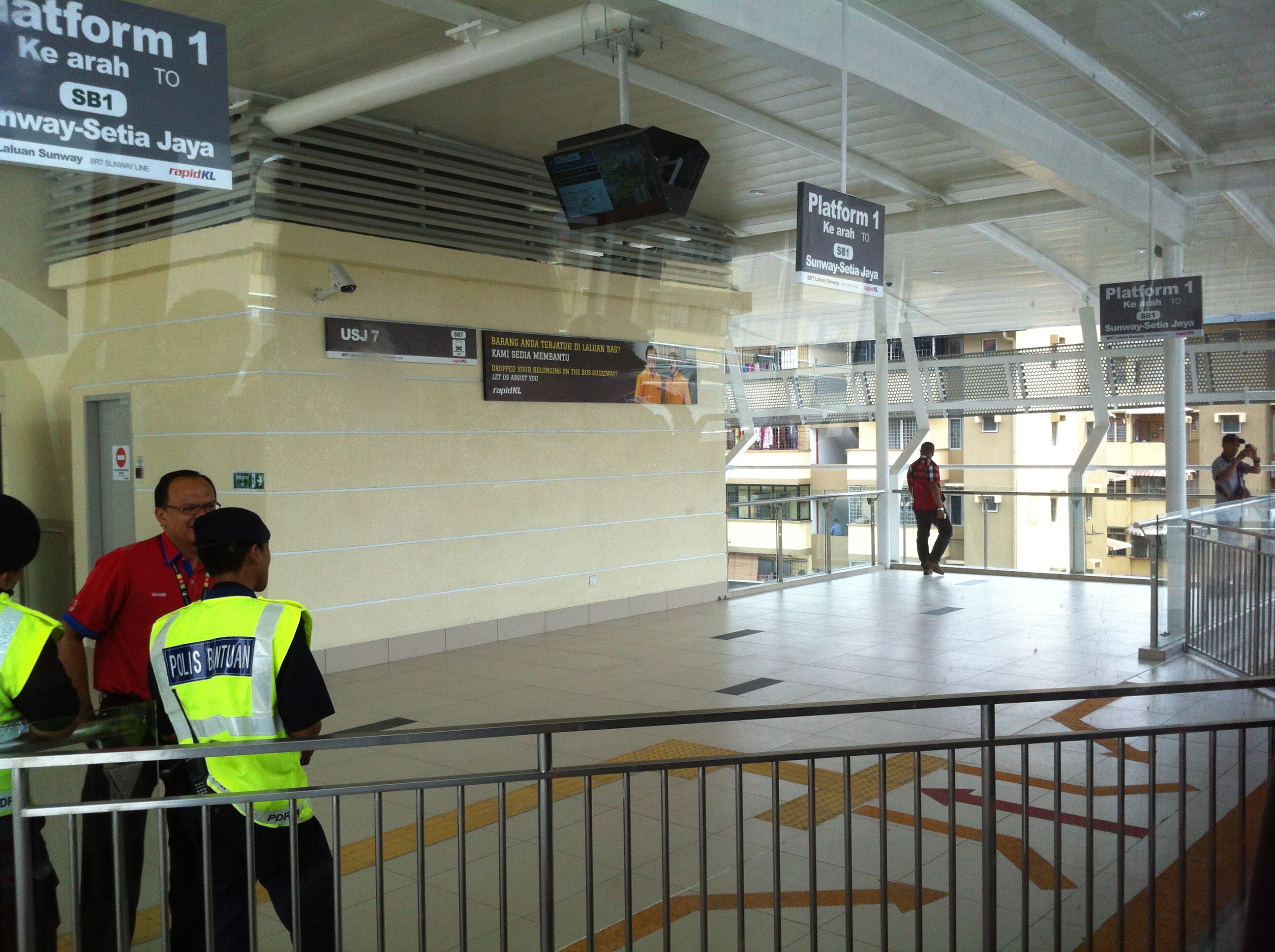
The BRT USJ 7 platform/halt.

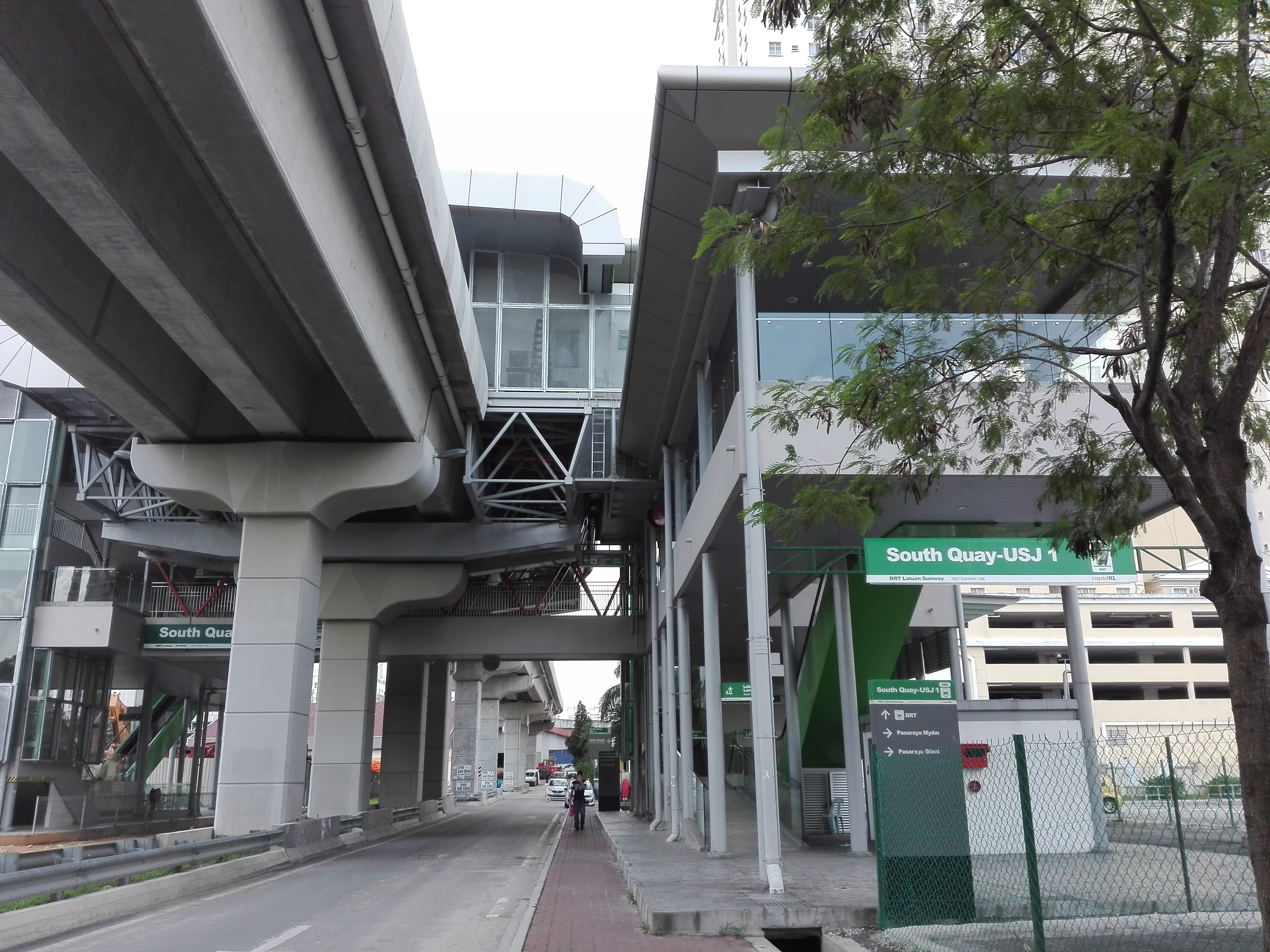
South Quay-USJ 1 BRT station from the front.

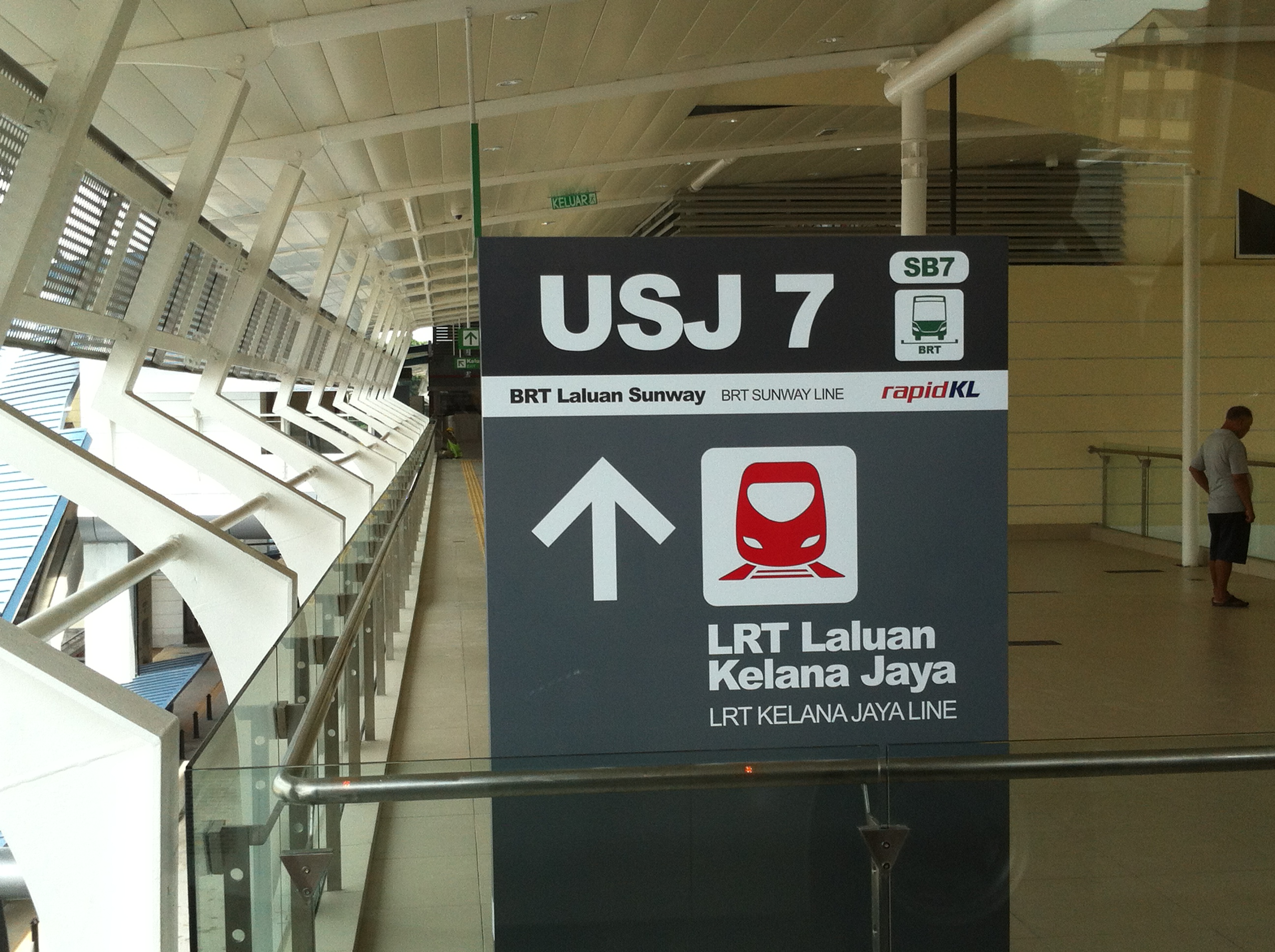
The BRT USJ 7 halt signage interchange to upcoming Kelana Jaya Line.

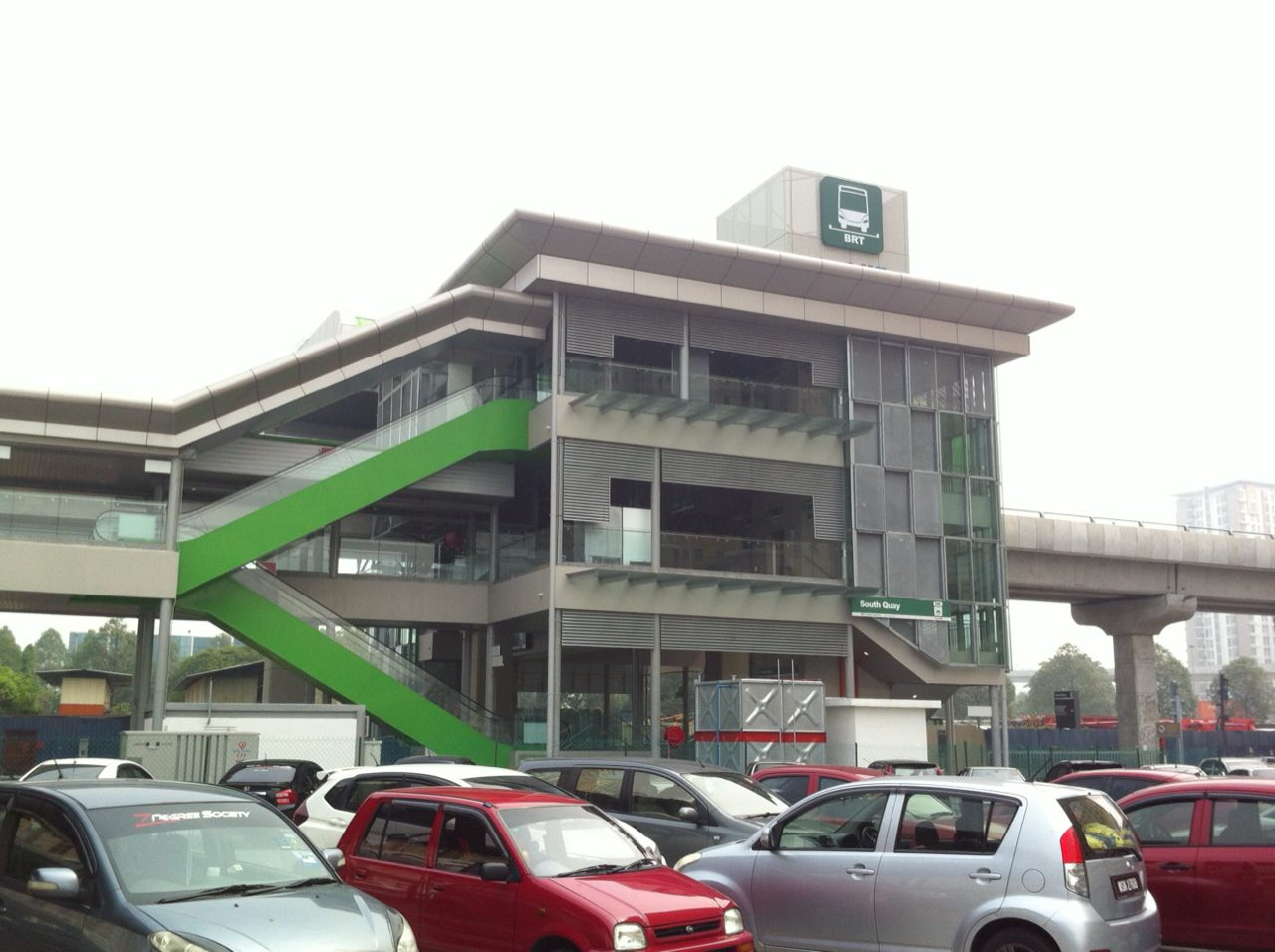
BRT South Quay-USJ 1 halt from the ground level.

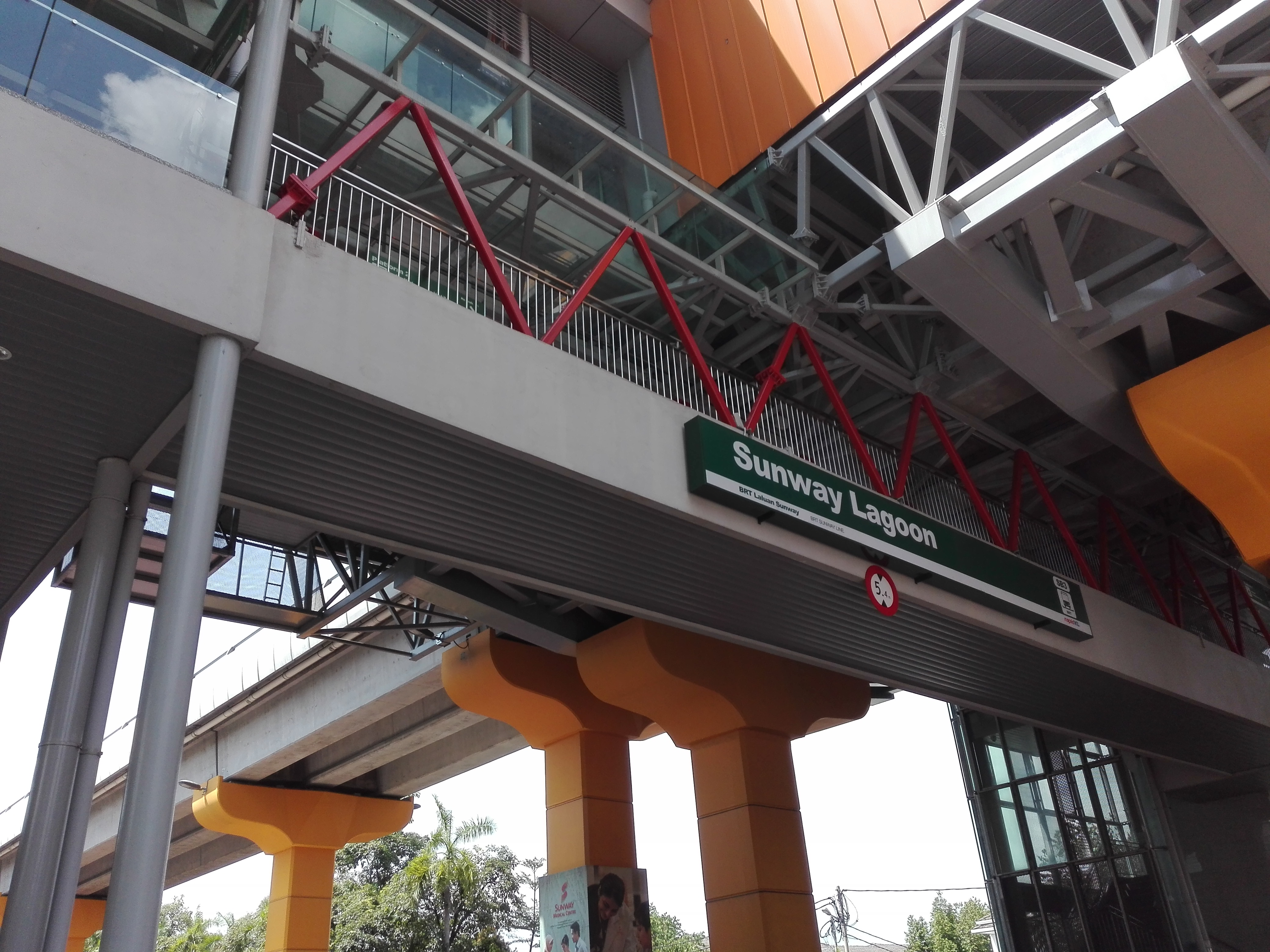
The road signboard for Sunway Lagoon BRT station.

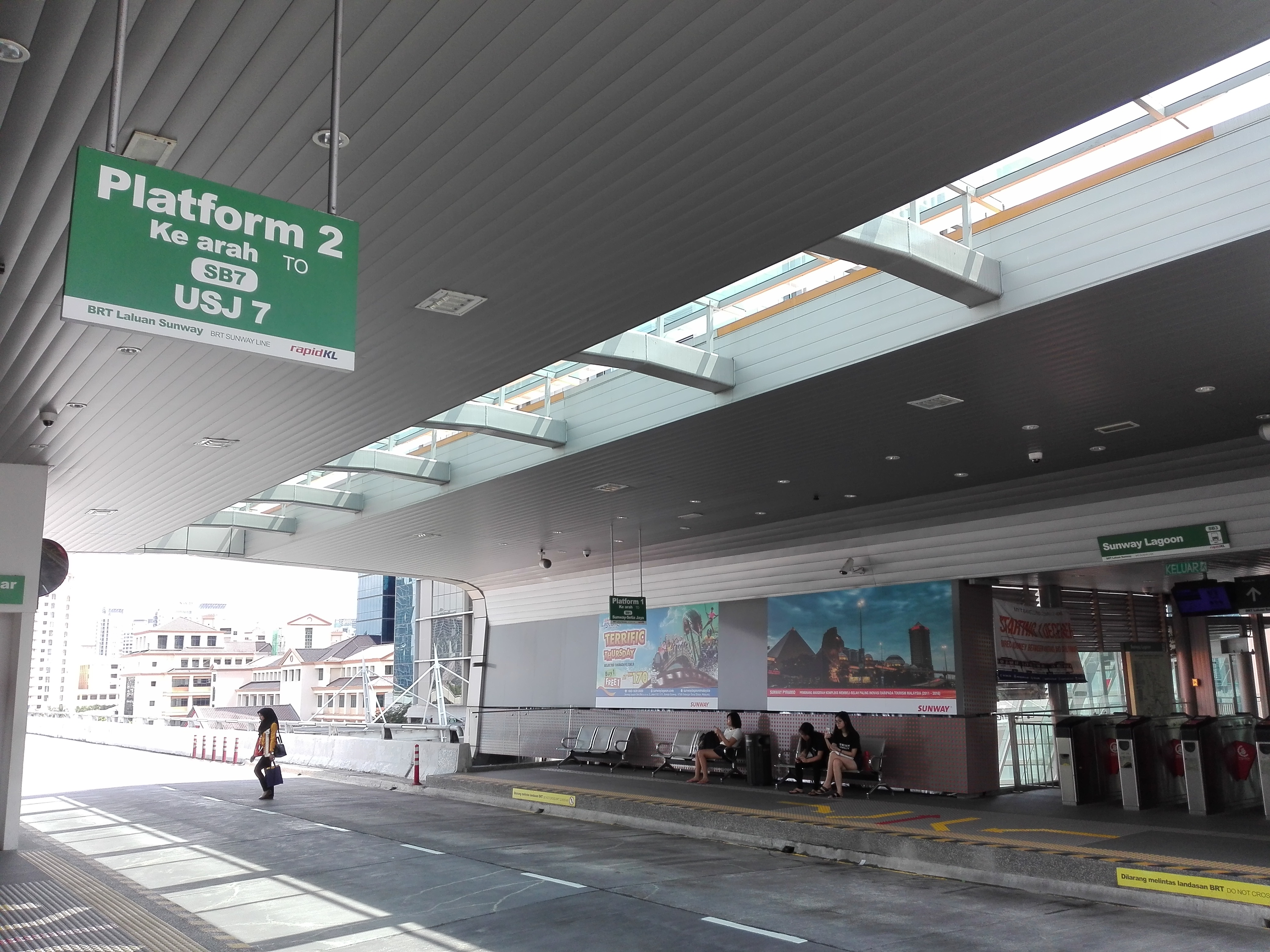
The platform at BRT Sunway Lagoon. Commuters must not cross the busway directly.

== See also ==
- List of bus rapid transit systems
- Public transport in Kuala Lumpur
- Buses in Kuala Lumpur
- Prasarana Malaysia Berhad
  - Rapid Bus Sdn Bhd
    - Rapid KL
      - BRT Sunway Line
      - BRT Federal Line
    - Rapid Penang
    - Rapid Kuantan
- Land Public Transport Commission (SPAD)
- Sunway Group
