= The One Academy =

Art school in Petaling, Selangor, Malaysia

The One Academy of Communication Design
- Motto: Masters Train Masters
- Type: Private college
- Established: 1991
- Founders: Tatsun Hoi & Veronica Ho
- Location: Sunway, Petaling Jaya, Selangor, Malaysia George Town, Penang, Malaysia
- Website: www.toa.edu.my

The One Academy of Communication Design (commonly known as The One Academy) is a private arts and design institute. Its main campus is located in Bandar Sunway, Selangor, with a northern campus in George Town, Penang.

== History ==
One of the previous logos of The One Academy

The One Academy was founded in 1991 by Tatsun Hoi and Veronica Ho.

Tatsun Hoi, Principal and Managing Director of The One Academy, is the Honorary President of the Young Entrepreneurs Association of Malaysia. The late Veronica Ho was a Dean's List Scholar from New York's Parsons School of Design. She served as Joint Managing Director and Dean of Studies at The One Academy from 1991 until 2009. Ali Mohamed, former chairman of Leo Burnett Malaysia, is the current chairman of The One Academy.

== Academic Structure ==
The One Academy offers academic programs at both diploma and bachelor's degree levels. The academy comprises the following eight schools:

- School of Visual Communication Design
- School of Digital Animation
- School of Digital Media Design
- School of Illustration
- School of Interior Design
- School of Fine Arts
- School of Visual Effects
- School of Fashion Design & Pattern Making (ESMOD Kuala Lumpur)

=== University of Hertfordshire - The One Academy Design Degree Program ===
In 2008, The One Academy partnered with the University of Hertfordshire in the United Kingdom to provide several Bachelor of Arts (Honors) degree programs. Students can complete the courses and earn degrees either at its Bandar Sunway campus or in the United Kingdom:

- Bachelor of Arts (Hons) in Digital Media Design
- Bachelor of Arts (Hons) in Graphic Design
- Bachelor of Arts (Hons) in Interior Architecture and Design

=== ESMOD Kuala Lumpur ===
In 2012, The One Academy collaborated with ESMOD Paris to establish a fashion design institute in Kuala Lumpur, aiming to meet the growing demand for an international design school in the region. ESMOD has 20 schools in 13 countries worldwide, offering the same fashion design syllabus. Upon completing the 3-year course, which combines creativity in fashion design and practical skills in pattern making, students receive a Diploma in Fashion Design and Pattern Making.

== Publications ==
- Astonishing Digital Art II
- Astonishing Digital Art IV
