= South Quay-USJ 1 BRT station =

Bus station in Selangor, Malaysia

Coordinates: 3.061569°N 101.596649°E

SB6 South Quay-USJ 1
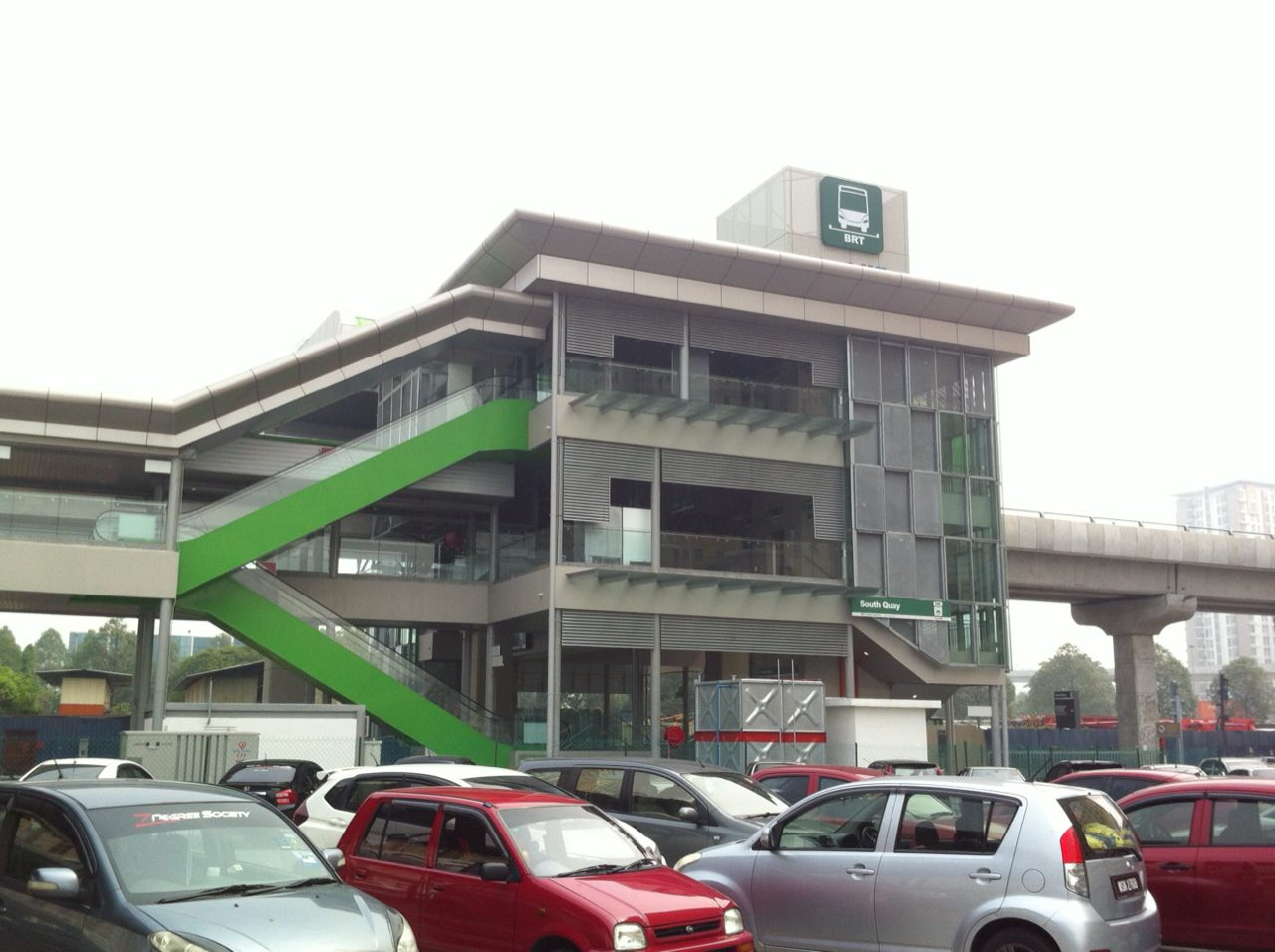
- The station from the Mydin parking lot

General information
- Other names: Malay: ساوث کي-يو.ايس.جيه. ساتو (Jawi); Chinese: 南湖－USJ 1; Tamil: சவுத் கீ-யூஎஸ்ஜே 1
- Location: Jalan Subang 1, Subang Light Industrial Park, 47500 Subang Jaya, Selangor
- System: | BRT station
- Owner: Prasarana Malaysia
- Operator: Rapid Bus
- Line: B1 BRT Sunway
- Platforms: 2 side platforms

Construction
- Structure type: Elevated
- Parking: Available

Other information
- Station code: SB6

History
- Opened: 2 June 2015

Services
| Preceding station | | Following station |
|---|---|---|
| USJ 7 Terminus | BRT Sunway Line | SunU-Monash towards Sunway-Setia Jaya |
Location

South Quay-USJ 1 BRT station is a bus rapid transit (BRT) station on the BRT Sunway Line. The station is located behind Mydin USJ 1 and serves the nearby Casa Subang apartments and the shopping malls around it.

Like other BRT stations on this line, the station is elevated.

== Gallery ==
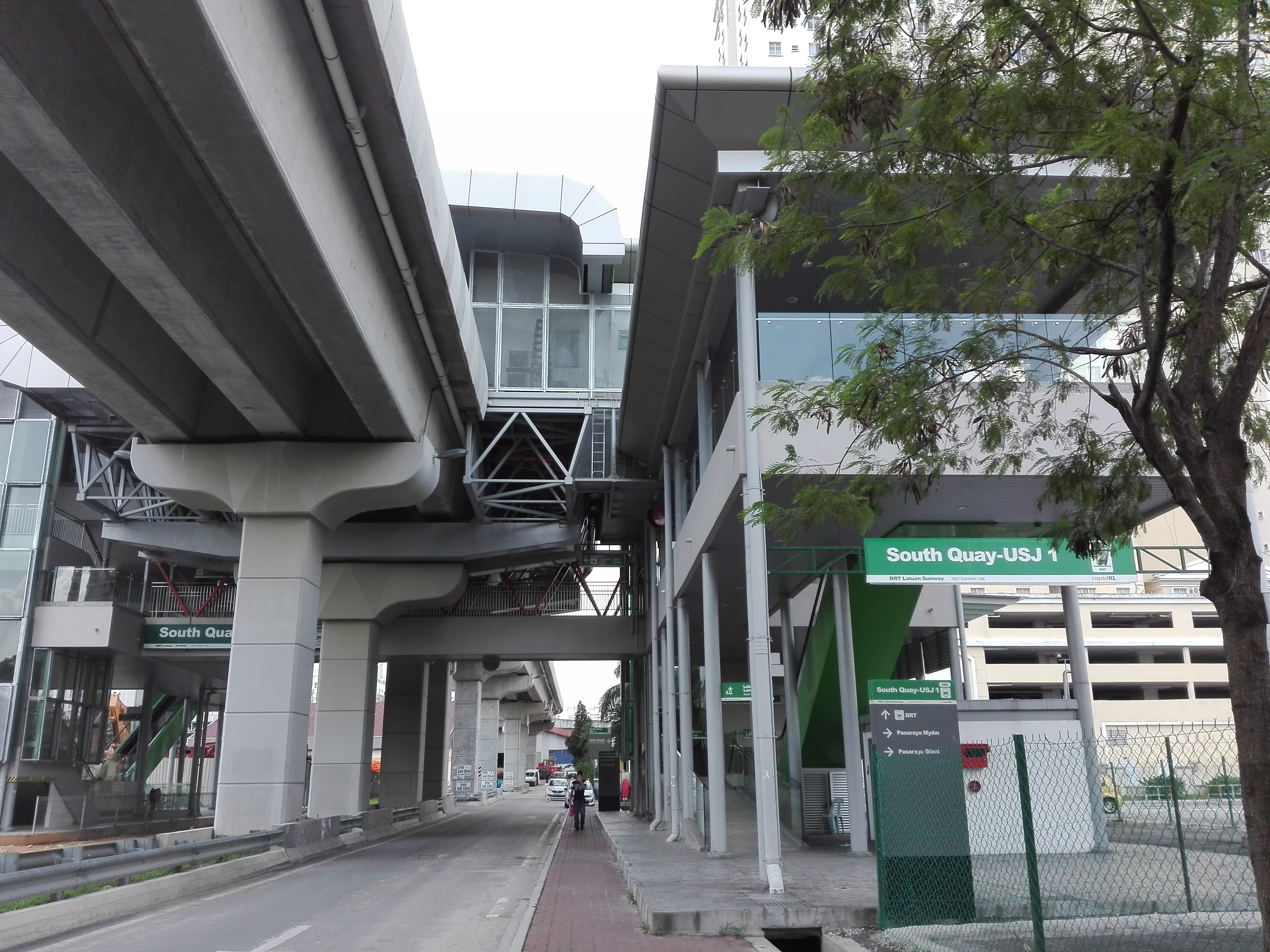
The station from street level

== Around the station ==
- Mydin Wholesale Hypermarket
- Giant Subang Jaya
- USJ Wholesale City
