= Sunway City =

Township in Subang Jaya, Selangor, Malaysia

Sunway City Kuala Lumpur Bandar Sunway (Malay)
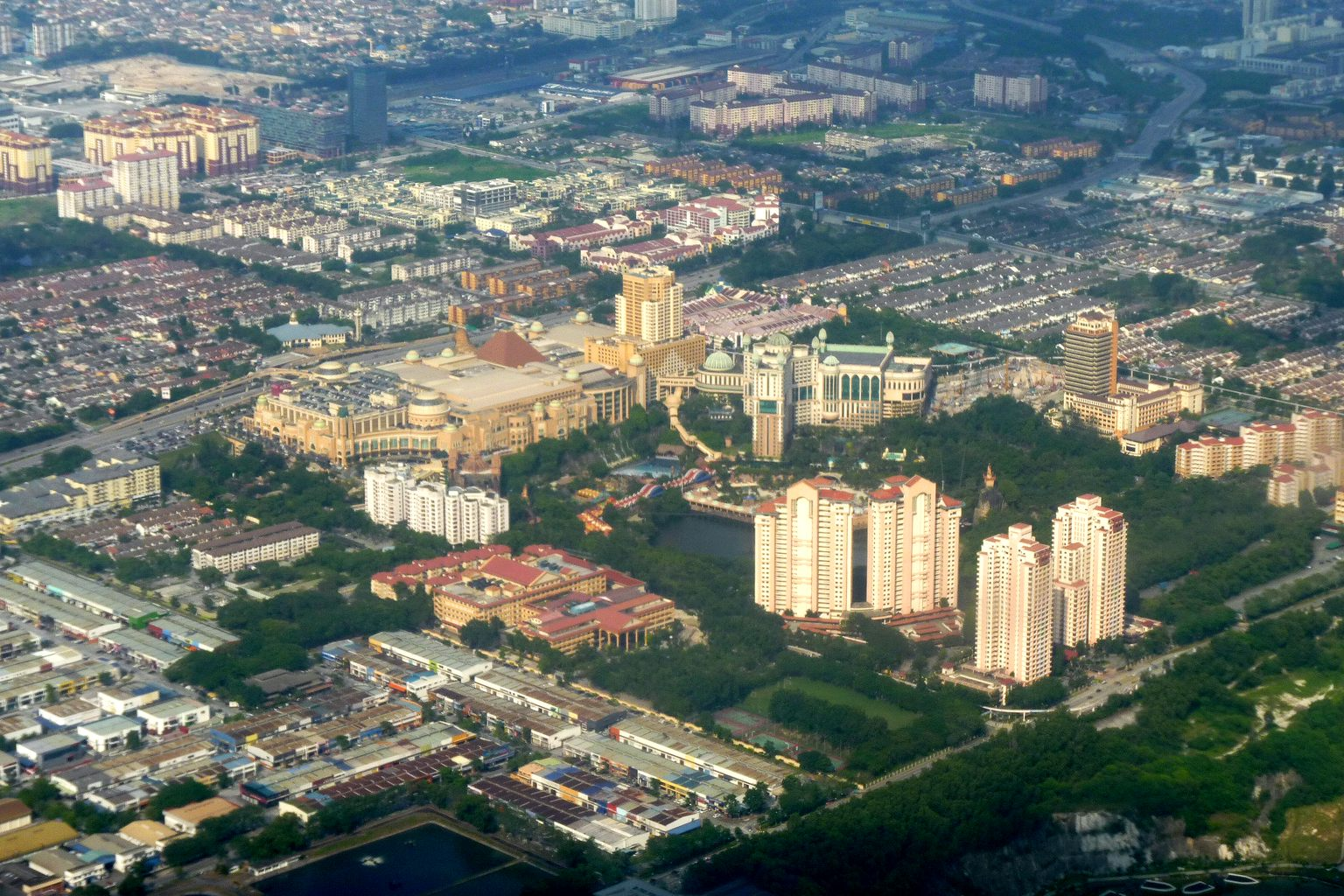
- Aerial view of Sunway City, looking northeast, in 2011

- Location in Peninsular Malaysia
- Coordinates: 3°4′3″N 101°36′12″E
- Country: Malaysia
- State: Selangor
- District: Petaling
- Parliament: P.104 Subang
- Established: 1988

Government
  - Administered by: Subang Jaya City Council (majority); Petaling Jaya City Council (partial)

Population (2020)
  - Total: 72,162
- Time zone: UTC+8 (MST)
- Website: sunway.city mbsj.gov.my

Sunway City (Malay: Bandar Sunway) is an 800-acre integrated township in Subang Jaya, Selangor, Malaysia. The township takes its name from its developer, Sunway Group, which was itself named after Sungai Way, a suburb in Selangor. Sunway City is said to incorporate the urban planning concept of a 15-minute city.

== Leisure and entertainment ==
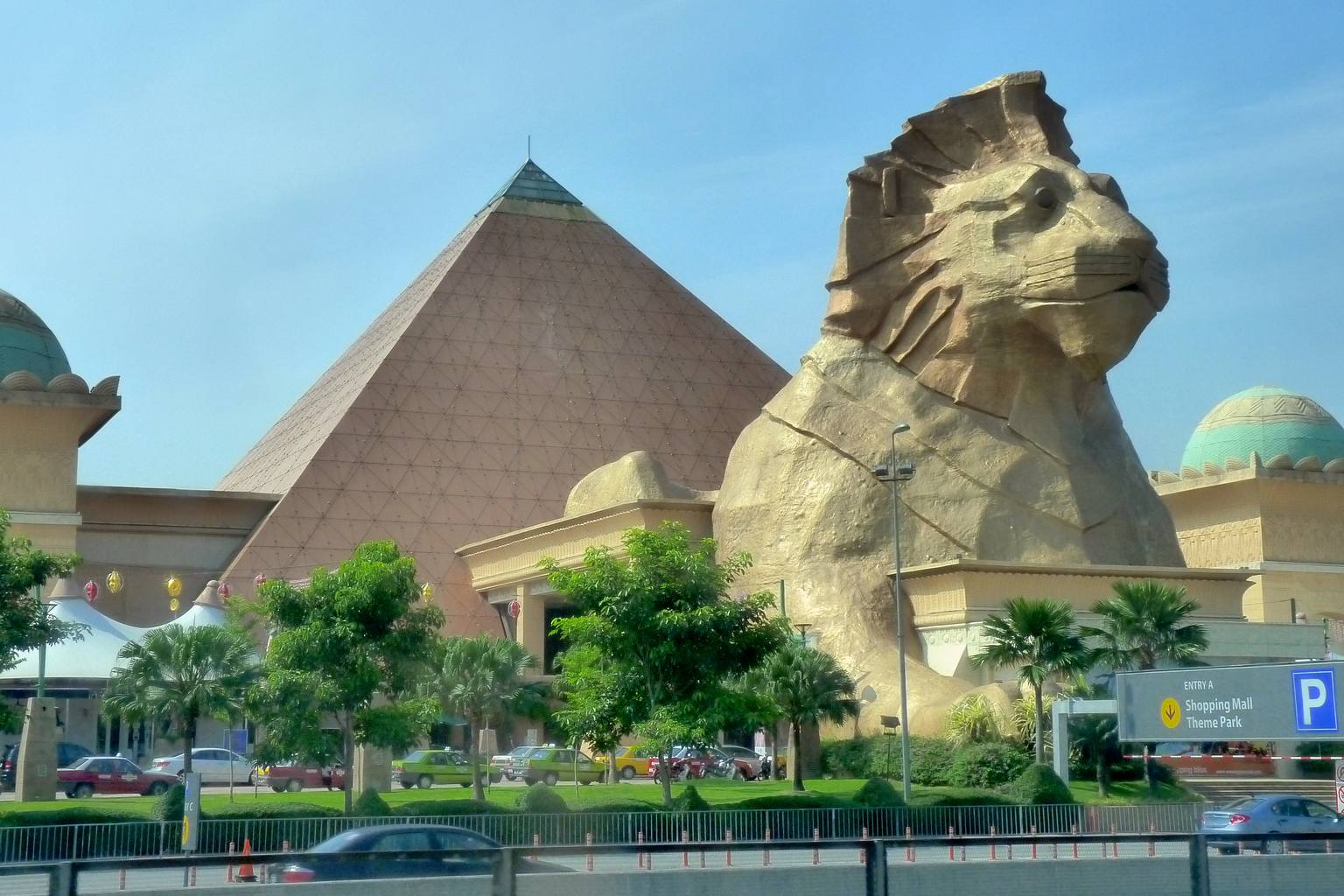
Front facade of Sunway Pyramid shopping mall.

Sunway Lagoon amusement park.

Sunway Pyramid, inaugurated in 1997, is recognized as Malaysia's first themed shopping and entertainment mall. The mall features an Egyptian-inspired design, including a prominent pyramid structure and a lion statue encompassing its entrance. The mall is divided into five distinct precincts—Fashion Central, Oasis Boulevard, Asian Avenue, Marrakesh, and The Link—offering a diverse range of retail and dining options.

Adjacent to the mall is Sunway Lagoon, an 88 acre "multi-park destination" with over 120 attractions. Notable features include the Vuvuzela, touted as the world's largest vortex water ride, and various themed zones catering to different age groups.

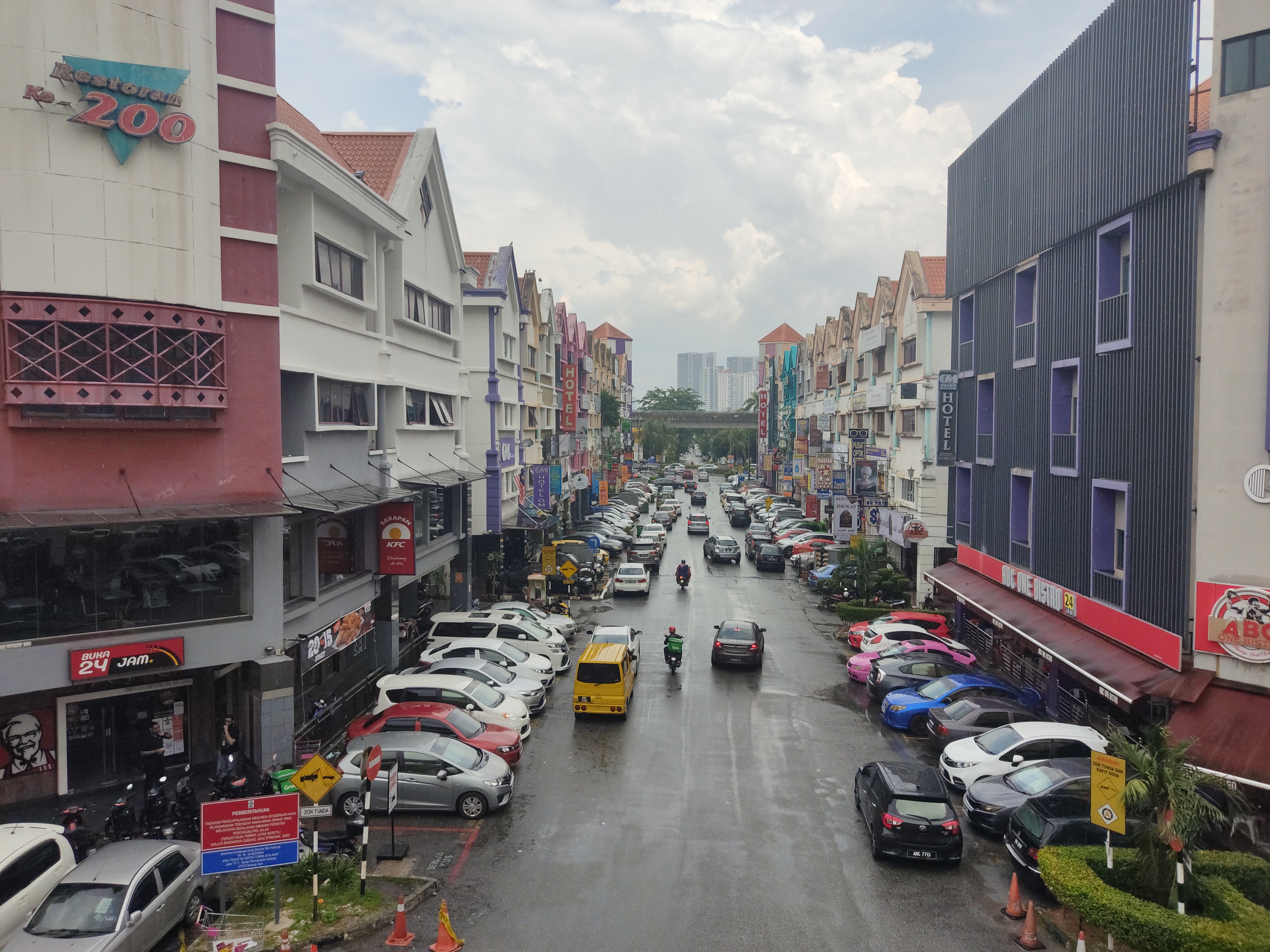
Jalan PJS 11/28 is one of the commercial street within the township

The township also hosts several commercial areas, such as Jalan PJS 11/28, which accommodate a variety of restaurants, banks, and other businesses..

== Accommodation ==
Sunway Resort Hotel

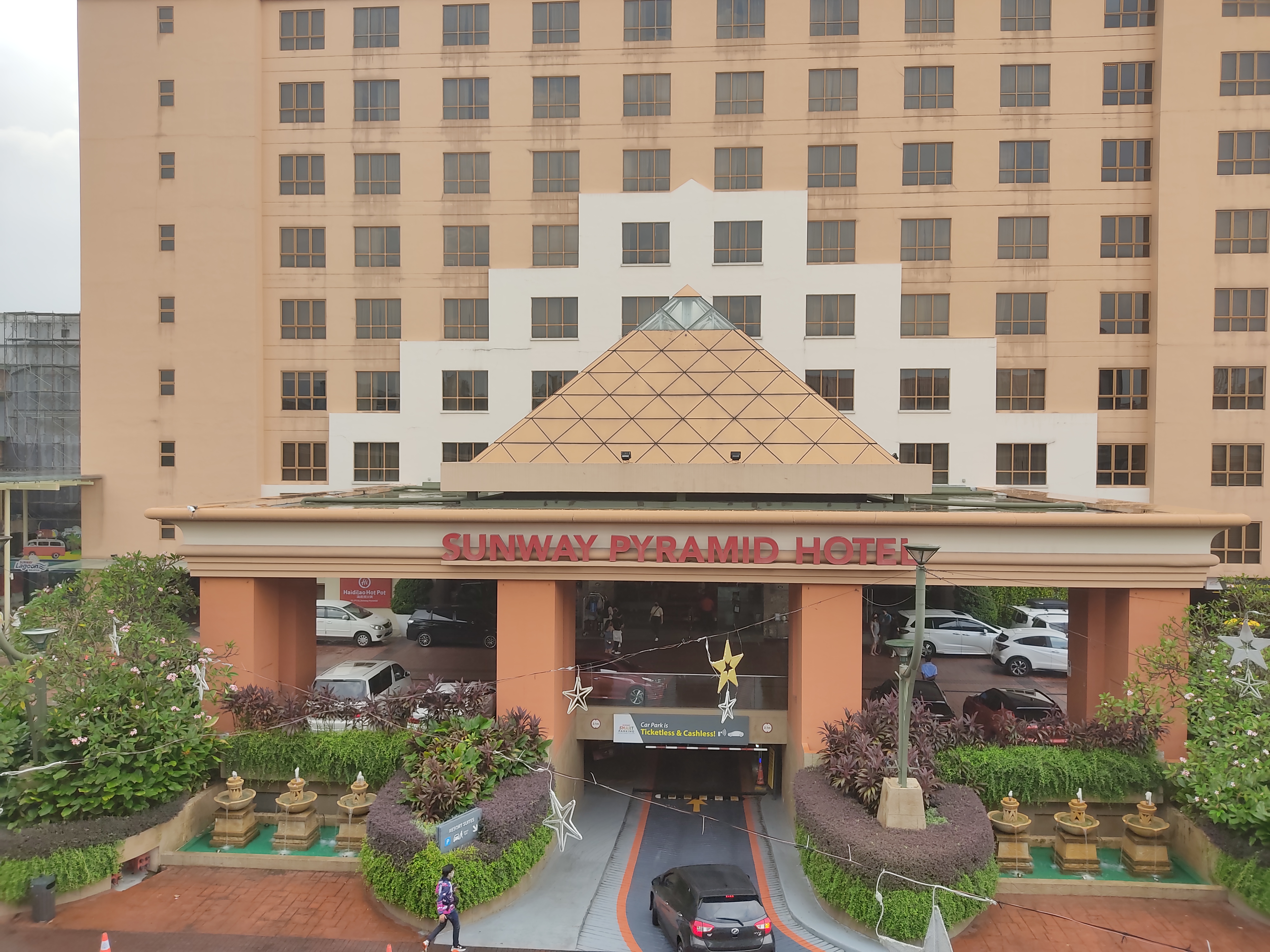
Sunway Pyramid Hotel

Bandar Sunway has a range of accommodations, including the Sunway Resort Hotel & Spa (formerly Sunway Lagoon Resort Hotel), the Sunway Pyramid Hotel, and the Sunway Lagoon Hotel (formerly Sunway Clio Hotel).

== Education ==
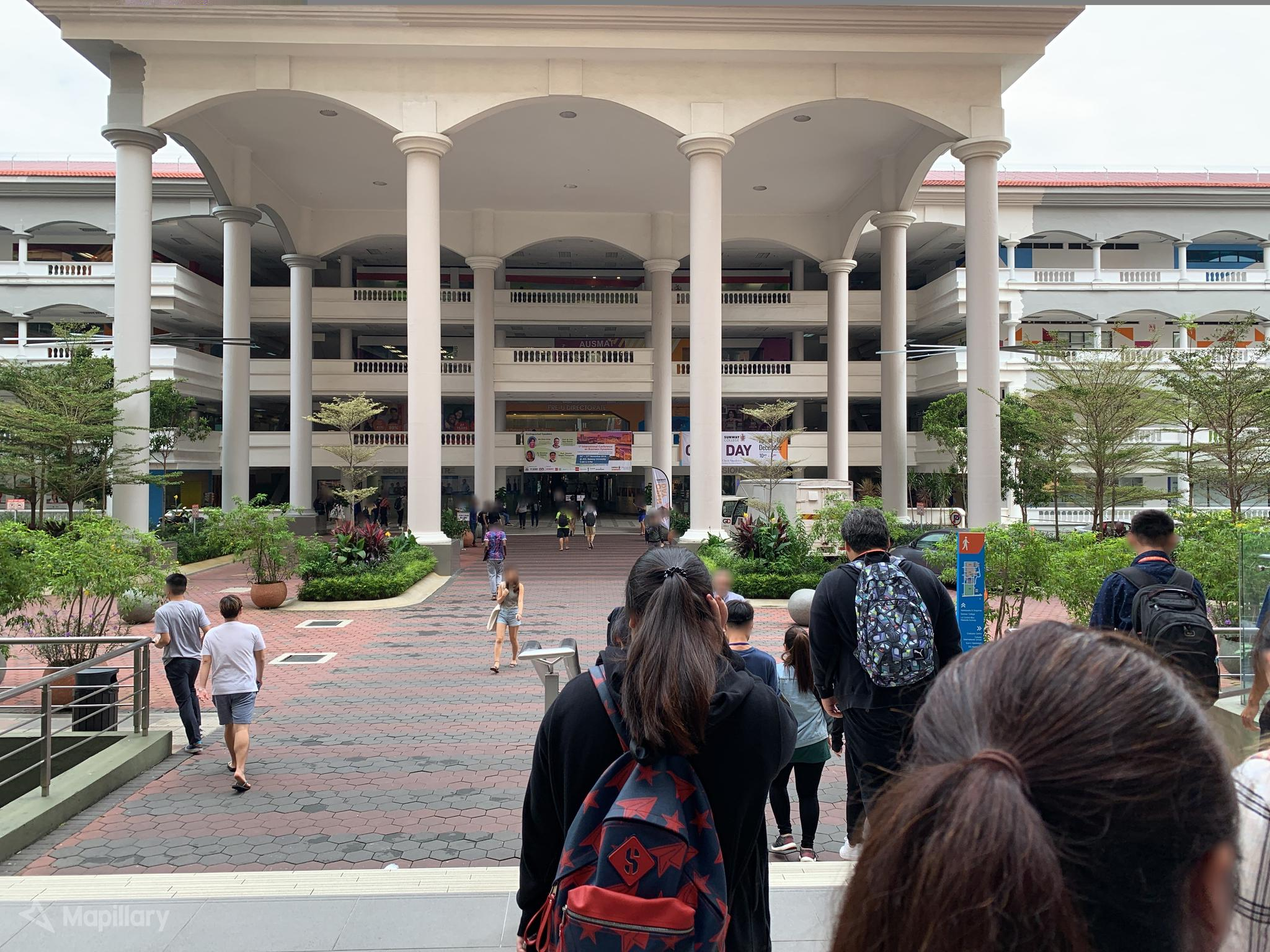
Students at Sunway University

Sunway has also become known as a higher education hub, with two large universities in the area, namely Monash University Malaysia, and Sunway University, as well as other private colleges such as Sunway College, Le Cordon Bleu Malaysia and The One Academy.

There are other notable schools in Sunway which are SK Bandar Sunway, SMK Bandar Sunway, SK Kampung Lindungan and Sunway International School.

== Healthcare ==
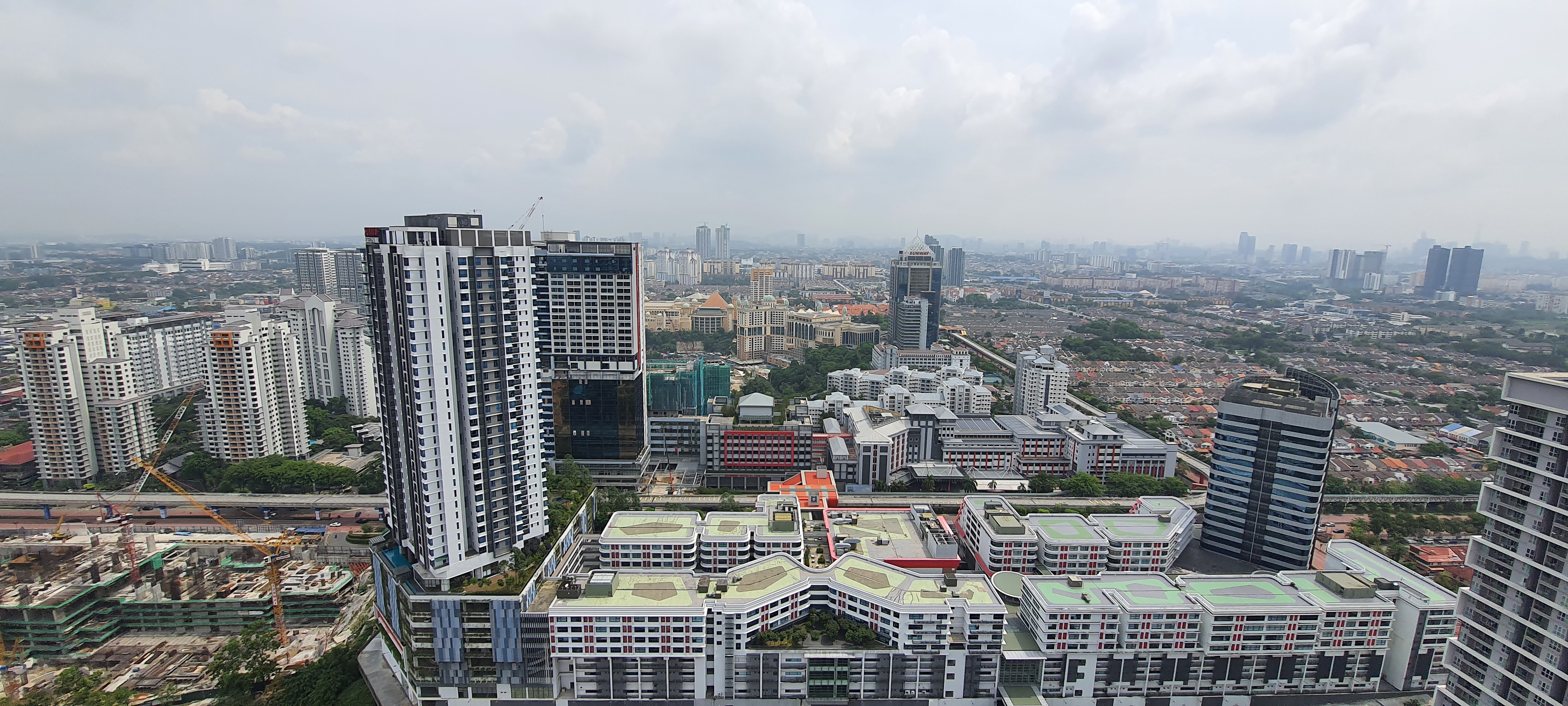
Panoramic view of Bandar Sunway taken in April 2022, in the foreground is the Sunway Geo commercial block with Sunway Medical Center behind it

Sunway Medical Centre, established in 1999 within Sunway City, is a private hospital offering a comprehensive range of medical services. The hospital has received multiple accreditations, including the Joint Commission International (JCI) Gold Seal of Approval, the Australian Council on Healthcare Standards (ACHS), and recognition from the Malaysian Society for Quality in Health (MSQH).

Recent expansions include the development of a Children's Health Block in Tower F, aiming to provide specialized pediatric care across more than 10 sub-specialties.

Additionally, Sime Darby Medical Centre, formerly known as Subang Jaya Medical Centre, is located in the neighboring area of Subang Jaya, offering a range of healthcare services.

== Religion ==
Sunway City is home to various places of worship catering to its diverse community. Masjid Al-Husna, situated near Sunway Pyramid, serves the Muslim population in the area.

For the Buddhist community, the Subang Jaya Buddhist Association (SJBA) is located in nearby SS13, Subang Jaya, providing religious services and community activities along with Passaddhi Buddhist Centre and Dharma Drum Mountain Buddhist Centre.

Christian residents have access to several churches in the vicinity, including the Church of St. Ignatius in Kelana Jaya, Petaling Jaya, as well as Church of the Assumption in Jalan Templer, Old Town, Petaling Jaya and the Church of St Thomas More in USJ, Subang Jaya.

== Transport ==
Bandar Sunway is connected to the cities of Kuala Lumpur, Shah Alam, Petaling Jaya and Klang via a network of highways. The highways accessible to Bandar Sunway is the Federal Highway, Shah Alam Expressway (KESAS), New Pantai Expressway (NPE) and Damansara–Puchong Expressway (LDP). The township is also served by an urban-suburb rail link, the Subang Jaya Komuter station.

=== Public transport ===
Bandar Sunway is home to Malaysia's first (and to date, only) bus rapid transit line, the BRT Sunway Line. It connects the Setia Jaya station (Sunway-Setia Jaya) in the north to the USJ7 station in the south, passing through Sunway Mentari, Sunway Pyramid and Monash University in the process.

A monorail service named Sunway Monorail (alternatively known as Suntrek 2000) operated in Bandar Sunway from 2000 to 2007 and was the second monorail system to operate in Malaysia following the Genting Monorail and the first public monorail in the country, opening in 2000 and predating the launch of the Kuala Lumpur Monorail by three years. There were two monorails primarily ran along a 3 km steel-tracked loop system surrounding the Sunway Lagoon water theme park, stopping at three key locations on the northern and western side of the loop: Sunway Pyramid East station, Sunway Pyramid West station (now Johnny Rockets hamburger restaurant) and Sunway College station, with a branch line extends 600m west towards the monorail system's depot from the loop. The monorail system operated with two five-car SL5 trains in its rolling stock; the trains produced by Severn-Lamb, a British locomotive manufacturer. The total cost of the loop was an estimated US$10 million. The system has since been shut down due to the expansion of Sunway Pyramid, and parts of its infrastructure were later incorporated into the BRT line.

Alternately, there are rapidKL bus services connecting Sunway Pyramid to Subang Jaya station, some 15–20 minutes away. The Selangor state government also provides its subsidized bus service - the Smart Selangor bus route SJ02, connecting Bandar Sunway to Pusat Bandar Puchong.

The Subang Airport is 13 kilometres from this development; since May 2018 rail connection to the airport is possible via an interchange at Subang Jaya station to the KL Sentral–Terminal Skypark Line.

=== Car ===
Bandar Sunway is located near the junction of the Damansara–Puchong Expressway and KL–Port Klang Federal Highway Federal Route 2. Motorists coming from Puchong, Putrajaya and even Seremban will opt for the LDP.

A few kilometres south lies another interchange, this time between the LDP and Shah Alam Expressway, which connects Pandamaran near Port Klang to Sri Petaling.

Running directly in front of Sunway Pyramid mall is the New Pantai Expressway, which runs from Subang Jaya to Angkasapuri in Lembah Pantai in southwestern Kuala Lumpur.

== Politics and administration ==
The township falls within the neighbourhood sections of PJS 7 to PJS 11 (PJS meaning "Petaling Jaya Selatan" or Petaling Jaya South). Since 1997 much of Bandar Sunway was governed by the MBSJ, taking over from MBPJ. MBPJ however retains administration over the northern part of the township, including PJS 10, PJS 5, PJS 6, Sunway Mentari and Setia Jaya.

Bandar Sunway falls under the Subang constituency of the Malaysian Parliament, currently held by Wong Chen of the PKR.

On the state level, Bandar Sunway is represented in the Selangor State Legislative Assembly as part of Subang Jaya constituency. The incumbent assemblywoman for Subang Jaya is Michelle Ng from the DAP who succeeded Hannah Yeoh of the DAP since the aftermath of Malaysian general election, 2018.
