= Putra Heights =

- town
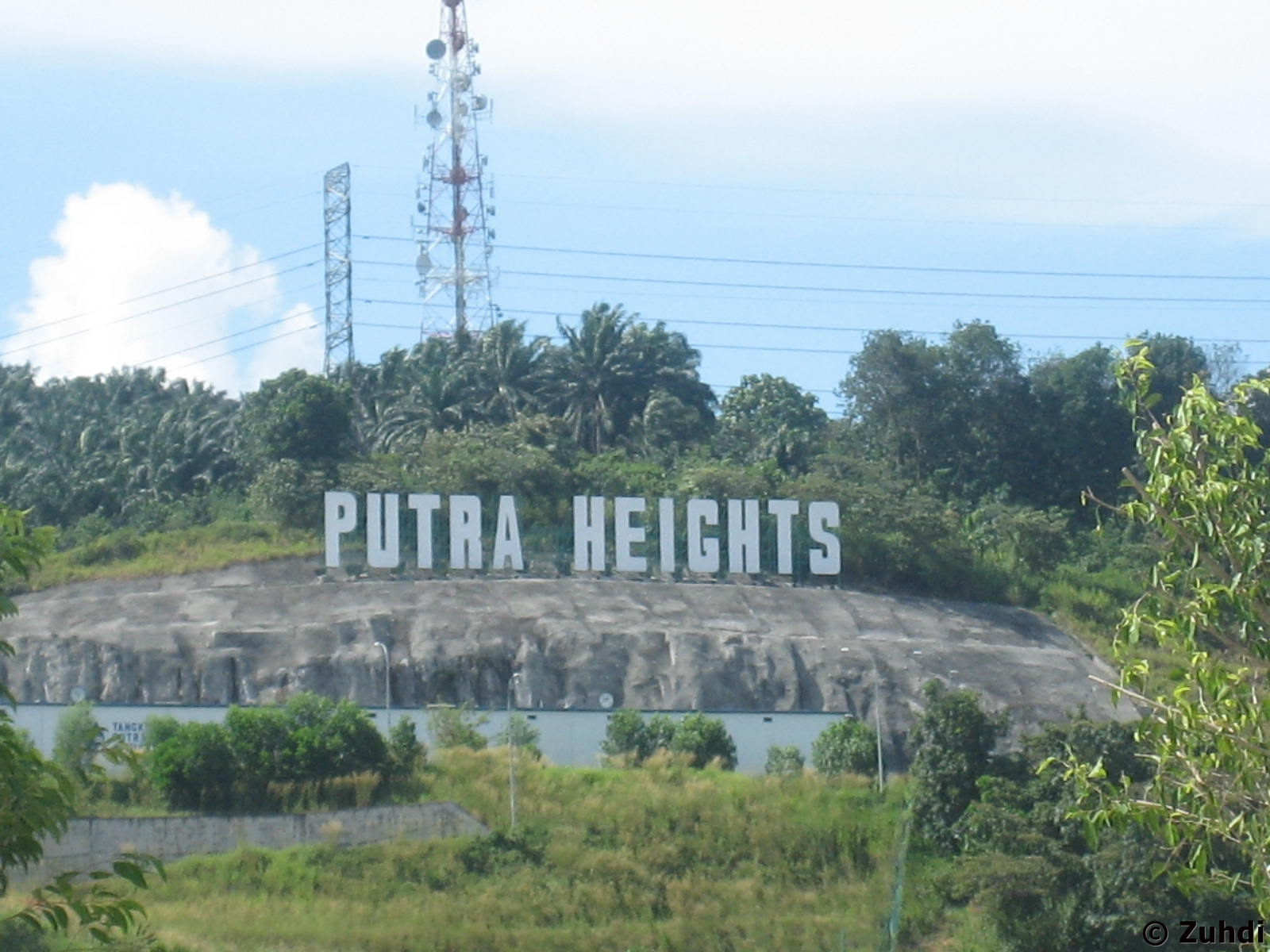
- Putra Heights sign on top of Bukit Cermin.

- Location in Peninsular Malaysia
- Coordinates: 3°3′52″N 101°35′37″E
- Country: Malaysia
- State: Selangor
- District: Petaling

Government
  - Administered by: Majlis Bandaraya Subang Jaya (Subang Jaya City Council)
- Time zone: UTC+8 (MST)
- Postcode: 47650
- Area codes: +603-51, +603-5614

Putra Heights is a 1,796 acres residential township developed by Sime UEP Properties since 1999 in Subang Jaya, Selangor, Malaysia. It is located within the mukim of Petaling District.

== History ==
Before 1974, Subang Jaya was part of Klang District. The development of Subang Jaya commenced on 21 February 1976.

1980s and 1990s:

The first development phase focused on the housing estates of what is now SS12 to SS19. After its completion in 1988, Sime UEP began developing USJ 1 to USJ 27. In 1997, Subang Jaya was granted municipality status, upgrading it from Petaling District Council to become the Subang Jaya Municipal Council.

Late 1990s: Putra Heights Expansion:

Subang Jaya’s boundaries expanded further with the launch of Putra Heights in 1999. By 2009, Putra Heights had over 6,400 mixed properties, including 5,000 double-storey link houses, 56 bungalow lots, 324 shop-offices, and more than 1,000 mid-cost apartments.

2010s: Rapid Urbanization and the Next Growth Spurt:

Infrastructure development and the public transport system have been significant growth factors for the area. In 2016, the LRT Kelana Jaya line extension project extended the Kelana Jaya Line by 17 km to Putra Heights, passing through Subang Jaya and USJ. This extension revitalized Putra Heights, with the Kelana Jaya LRT line now ending in the township.

== Type of development ==
Putra Heights is primarily a residential township with a mix of property types:

Residential Developments:

- Landed properties:
  - Bungalows
  - Semi-detached houses
  - Terrace houses
  - Link houses
- High-rise residences:
  - Condominiums
  - Apartments
  - Service apartments

Commercial Developments:

- Retail outlets
- Shop-Offices
- Commercial centers
- Hypermarket

=== Recent Developments ===
- Putra Heights Sentral: A mixed-use development that includes residential, commercial, and retail spaces. The project features Serasi Residences, a service apartment complex and is located near the Putra Heights LRT Station.
- The Glades: A gated community within Putra Heights, offering low-density housing options such as bungalows, superlink homes, cluster villas, townhouses, and low-rise condominiums.

== Retail and Amenities ==
- The Glades Plaza: A retail plaza within The Glades community, featuring a variety of cafés, restaurants, and retail outlets.
- Putra Point Commercial Centre: The main commercial hub of Putra Heights, offering a range of services such as restaurants, cafés, pharmacies, clinics, and financial services.
- Giant Hypermarket Putra Heights: A large retail store that provides a wide range of products, including groceries and household items.
- Main Place: Located in USJ 21, Subang Jaya, this neighborhood mall offers a mix of retail shops, restaurants, and essential services, catering to the needs of the surrounding community.

== Transportation ==
=== Highways and expressways ===
The township is accessible via many major expressways, roads and railway network. The expressway that passes directly through the township is North–South Expressway Central Link (ELITE). The interchange at ELITE was opened to traffic on 19 February 2009, as the main route to Putra Heights. Other major expressways which connects through the ELITE expressway are the New Klang Valley Expressway (NKVE), Damansara–Puchong Expressway (LDP), South Klang Valley Expressway (SKVE) and Shah Alam Expressway (KESAS).

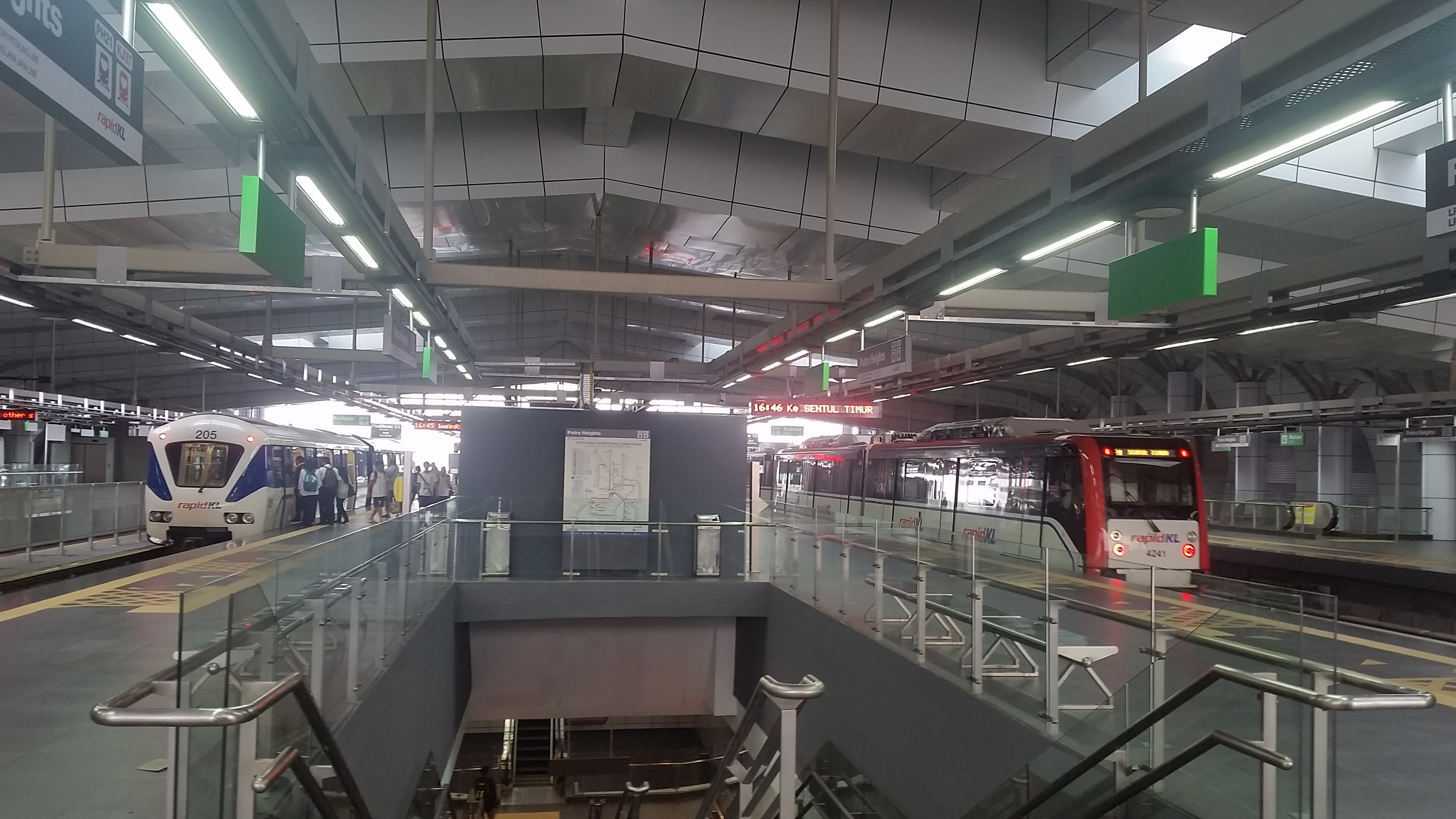
Putra Heights LRT Terminal

=== Metro system (LRT) ===
The township is now connected via LRT as of 2016. The Putra Heights LRT station on Rapid KL's Kelana Jaya line and Sri Petaling Line is located at Persiaran Putra Indah near Putra Point Commercial Centre and the Giant hypermarket. The LRT Extension Project (LEP) extended the Sri Petaling Line and Kelana Jaya Line to Putra Heights station. It is now the current southern terminus for both the LRT lines, where the station offers a cross-platform interchange between the two lines. The Kelana Jaya Line has been extended from its former terminus at Kelana Jaya station and the Subang Depot, running through residential areas and townships such as Ara Damansara, Kelana Jaya, Subang Jaya(where it integrates with the KTM Komuter Port Klang Line at Subang Jaya station), USJ (where it integrates with the BRT Sunway Line at USJ 7 station), Alam Megah, Subang Alam and finally to Putra Heights. The LRT line also connects commercial and recreational centres nearby the station such as the Dana 1 commercial centre, Kelana Centre Point, Subang Parade, the Empire Shopping Gallery, The Summit Shopping Mall, Main Place USJ, SS15 Courtyard, The 19 USJ City Mall and Da Men Mall USJ. Similarly, the Sri Petaling Line has been extended from its former terminus at Sri Petaling station, running through Awan Besar, Kampung Muhibbah, Bandar Kinrara where it runs along the Bukit Jalil Highway and through the Puchong city centre along the Damansara-Puchong Expressway (LDP) before going through Puchong Prima, Puchong Perdana and terminating at Putra Heights. The Sri Petaling Line also connects various recreational and commercial centres such as Giant Hypermarket Kinrara, IOI Mall Puchong, Tesco Hypermarket Puchong, SetiaWalk Puchong, Bandar Puteri Puchong and Kompleks Puchong Perdana. The station is the 2nd station after Masjid Jamek station that integrates both the Kelana Jaya Line and Sri Petaling Line.

== Education institutions ==
=== Private educational institutions ===
- Kingsley International School
- Fairview International School

=== Secondary schools ===
- SMK USJ23
- SMK Alam Megah

=== Primary schools ===
- SK Putra Heights 2
- SJK(C) Tun Tan Siew Sin

=== Pre-schools / kindergartens ===
- Q-Dees Putra Heights
- Kinderland Putra Heights

== Medical centres ==
- Ramsay Sime Darby Health Care (SJMC)
- Columbia Asia Hospital Bukit Rimau
- Columbia Asia Hospital Puchong
- Sunway Medical Center
- KPJ Selangor Specialist Hospital

== Public amenities ==
- Police Station
- Masjid Putra Heights
- Putra Heights Recreational Linear Park
- Taman Jogging Seksyen 2
- Putra Heights Community Park

== Demographics ==
The population of Putra Heights is diverse, with approximately 46% Bumiputera, 37% Chinese, 9.5% Indian, and 6.5% from other ethnicities, including non-Malaysian citizens.

== Notable events ==
On 1 April 2025, a pipeline explosion happened during the morning, which turned into a fire that lasted seven hours, resulting in 305 hospitalisations and emergency evacuations in the surrounding area of approximately 290 metres radius. The pipeline in question is owned by Petronas.
