= Kelana Jaya line extension =

Extension of one of Klang Valley LRT lines

Overview
- Status: Opened
- Owner: Prasarana Malaysia
- Locale: Malaysia
- Termini: Kelana Jaya; Putra Heights
- Stations: 13

Service
- Type: Rapid transit
- System: Klang Valley Integrated Transit System
- Services: 1
- Operator(s): RapidKL
- Depot(s): Lembah Subang
- Rolling stock: Innovia ART 200

History
- Opened: 30 June 2016

Technical
- Line length: 17.4 km
- Operating speed: 80 km/h

The Kelana Jaya line extension is an extension of one of the Klang Valley LRT lines completed in 2016. It is 17 km in length from Kelana Jaya to Putra Heights.

== History ==
The extensions of the LRT Kelana Jaya Line and Ampang and Sri Petaling Lines (formerly known as PUTRA and STAR LRT respectively), to USJ and Puchong respectively and converging at Putra Heights were proposed simultaneously by the government in 2006. (Note: In addition to these two extensions, a new line between Kota Damansara and Cheras (which became part of the Sungai Buloh—Kajang line) was proposed to improve public transport in the Klang Valley.) The extension is named as LRT Extension Project (LEP) and will be part of a RM10 billion plan to expand Kuala Lumpur's public transport network.

As of August 2008, Syarikat Prasarana Negara Berhad (SPNB, now known as Prasarana Malaysia) was reportedly running land and engineering studies for the proposed extension.

In September 2009, SPNB began displaying the alignment of the proposed extensions over a 3-month period for feedback. The Kelana Jaya extension will see 13 new stations over 17 km from Kelana Jaya to Putra Heights. Construction is expected to commence in early 2010.

In November 2010, Prasarana announced that it had awarded RM1.7 billion for the first phase of the project. The winners include Trans Resource Corp. Bhd. for the Kelana Jaya line extension. UEM Builders Bhd and Intria Bina Sdn Bhd were appointed as subcontractors for the fabrication and supply of segmental box girder jobs for the Kelana Jaya line. Phase 1 of the extension was to be from Kelana Jaya via the depot to The Summit (now USJ 7) while Phase 2 is from The Summit to Putra Heights.

Construction works on the Kelana Jaya line extension project are targeted to accelerate at the end of March 2011, with the commencement of structural works, subject to approval from the state government and local authorities. By April 2014, the 17.4 km LEP was more than two-thirds completed. 12 stations, with seven having park-and-ride facilities, will be on the extension.

== Opening ==
The extension was opened on 30 June 2016, together with the final part of the Sri Petaling line extension from Bandar Puteri to Putra Heights, with stations at:

- Lembah Subang
- Ara Damansara
- CGC - Glenmarie
- Subang Jaya
- SS15
- SS18
- USJ 7
- Taipan
- Wawasan
- USJ21
- Alam Megah
- Subang Alam
- Putra Heights

The line was officially inaugurated by Prime Minister Najib Tun Razak in the afternoon but the line was operational since 6am. The fare is based on the journey length itself, where the fare increases when the distance travelled increases.

== Services and rolling stock ==
The extension was to have train services from Gombak, alternating between Ara Damansara and Putra Heights as the terminus. Therefore, peak hours frequencies were 20 trains per hour (tph) between Gombak and Ara Damansara and 10tph between Ara Damansara and Putra Heights. This service was in place until the Klang Valley Additional Vehicle (KLAV) were brought into service in 2017.

The fleet serving the line remain the same, which are served by 35 2-coach articulated Bombardier Innovia Metro ART 200, 35 4-coach articulated ART 200 trains and the KLAV.

== Infrastructure ==
As part of a green initiative, station staff recruited on the extension will adopt green practices. Energy-efficient lights are installed at every station which have rainwater harvesting systems. Windows were designed to allow sunlight to penetrate into the station. During construction, recycling was done and sustainable materials are used.

== Developments ==
The extension has boosted developments at stations along the line. Transit-oriented development (TOD) were focused in Subang Jaya and USJ and more street lamps were installed to increase safety.
