= SS15 LRT station =

Light rapid transit station in Subang Jaya, Selangor, Malaysia

KJ29 SS15
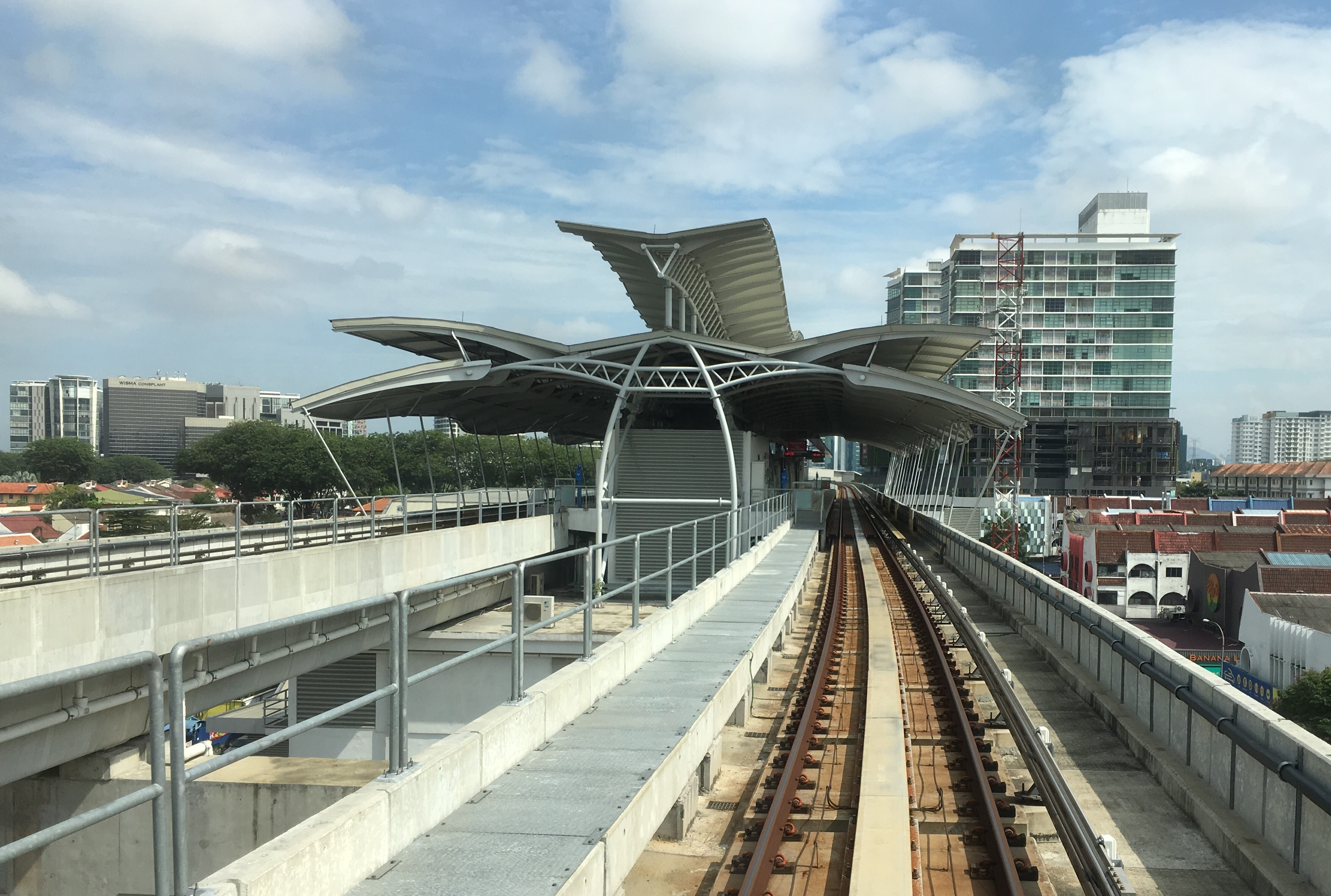
- View of the station from a departing train bound for Putra Heights

General information
- Other names: Malay: س.س. 15 (Jawi); Chinese: 梳邦－双溪威第十五区; Tamil: எஸ்எஸ் 15
- Location: Persiaran Jengka, SS15, 47500 Subang Jaya; Selangor; Malaysia
- Coordinates: 3.0758°N 101.5861°E
- System: Rapid KL
- Owner: Prasarana Malaysia
- Operator: Rapid Rail
- Line: 5 Kelana Jaya Line
- Platforms: 1 island platform
- Tracks: 2

Construction
- Structure type: Elevated
- Parking: Available outside the station
- Cycle facilities: Available, 20 bicycles

Other information
- Station code: KJ29

History
- Opened: 30 June 2016; 10 years ago

Services
Preceding station		Following station
Subang Jaya towards Gombak	Kelana Jaya Line	SS18 towards Putra Heights
Location

SS15 LRT station is a light rapid transit (LRT) station between the SS15 and SS17 neighborhoods of Subang Jaya, Selangor, Malaysia. The station is located on Persiaran Jengka.

It is served by the LRT Kelana Jaya Line. Like most other LRT stations operating in the Klang Valley, this station is elevated. This station is one of 13 that opened as part of the Kelana Jaya line extension, opening on 30 June 2016.

== Location ==
This station is located along Persiaran Jengka in Subang Jaya. To the east of the station is the SS15 commercial area, and to the west, the SS17 residential area. Also near this station is the SS17 National Secondary School (SMK SS17) and the New Pantai Expressway. Major landmarks around the station include:

- Masjid Darul Ehsan
- SS15 Courtyard
- Subang Park Hotel
- Subang Square Business Centre
- Subang Avenue
- Pasar Besar SS15 Subang Jaya
- INTI International College
- SS15 Bubble Tea Street
- SS17 National Secondary School (SMK SS17)

== Station features ==
This is an elevated station with three floors. There is one island platform on the second floor, the concourse on the first floor, and two entrances and exits on the ground floor. Tactile paving and elevators are also provided for the disabled, and there is a bicycle rack that can hold up to 20 bicycles.

=== Station layout ===
L2
Platform

Level

→ Platform 1: 5 Kelana Jaya Line towards KJ1 Gombak (Subang Jaya)
Island platform, doors open on the right
← Platform 2: 5 Kelana Jaya Line towards KJ37 Putra Heights (SS18)
L1
Concourse
Faregates to paid area, escalators, lifts, ticketing machines, customer service counter
G
Ground Level
Feeder Bus Stop, Taxi Lay-By

=== Exits and entrances ===
This station has two entrances and exits, both of which lead to Persiaran Jengka, and the station's bus stop and taxi and private vehicle lay-by. Entrance A leads to the SS15 commercial area, and Entrance B leads to the SS17 residential area.

Kelana Jaya Line station
Entrance	Location	Destination	Picture
A	Jalan SS15/4D / Persiaran Jengka (south)	Bus stop, taxi and private vehicle lay-by First Subang Mall, Subang Square, INTI International College, SS15 commercial area, SS15 Courtyard	
B	Persiaran Jengka (north)	Bus stop, taxi and private vehicle lay-by Subang Parade, Wisma Consplant, Wisma Tractors, SS17, Subang Jaya police station	

== Bus services ==
=== Feeder buses ===
Route No.	Origin	Destination	Via
T770	KJ28 Subang Jaya	Sunway Pyramid	Aeon Big Subang Jaya; Subang Parade; KJ29 SS15; New Pantai Expressway

=== Other buses ===
Route No.	Origin	Destination	Via
771	SB2 Mentari	Subang Mewah, USJ 1	Sunway Pyramid; Subang Jaya Medical Center (SJMC); Aeon Big Subang Jaya; Subang Parade; Masjid Darul Ehsan SS15; KJ29 SS15; First Subang; USJ 2, 3 & 4 Persiaran Tujuan; USJ 9, 11, 12; Jalan Mulia (USJ 14); Subang Perdana Goodyear Court 6, 7, 8, 9 & 10; Angsana Apartment; Masjid Al-Irsyad, USJ 1 SJK (C) Chee Wen
SJ01	KJ31 SB7 USJ 7	KD09 KS02 KJ28 Subang Jaya	

== Gallery ==
View of the elevated guideway and station from the SS15 Courtyard

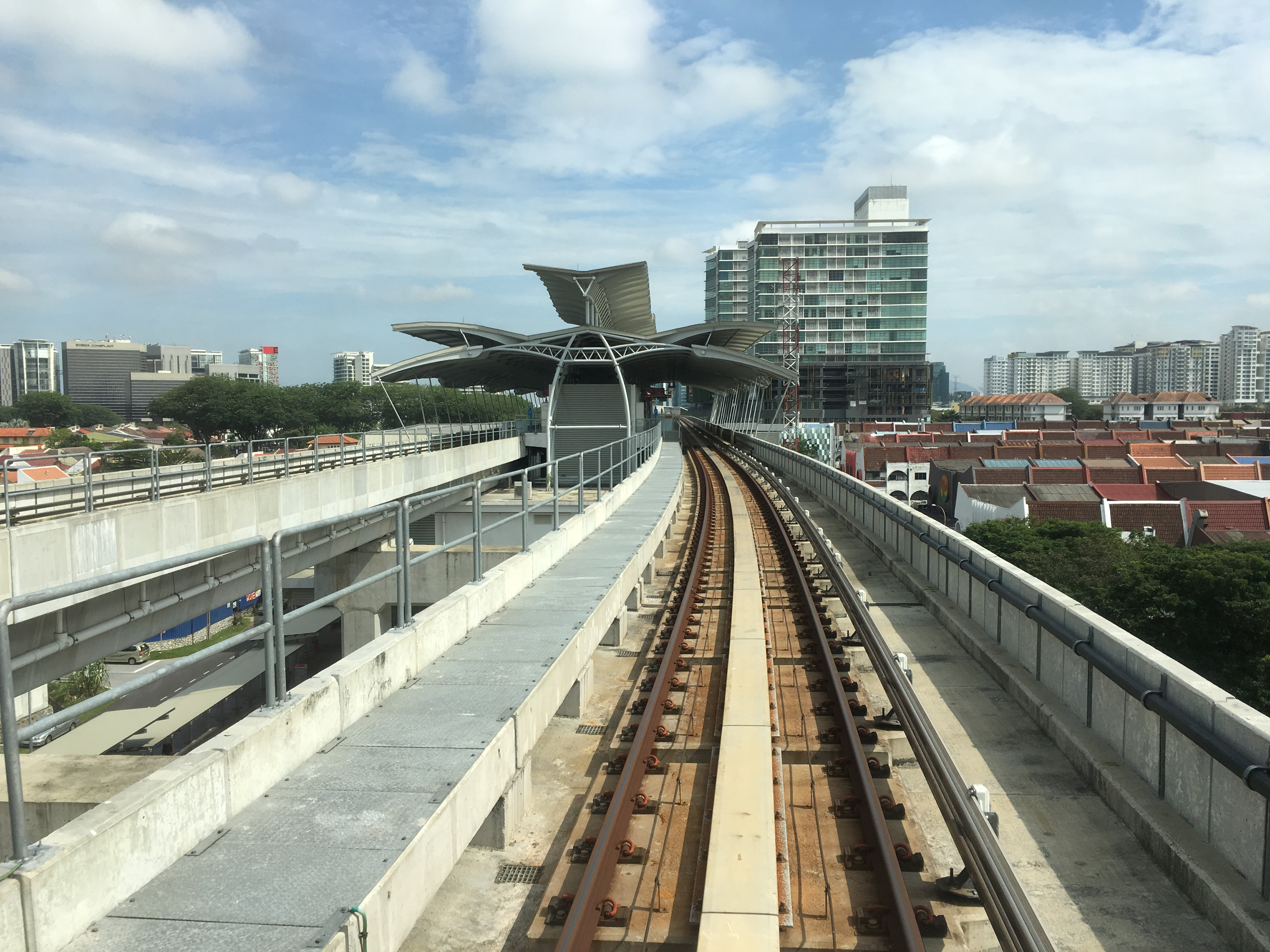
View of the station from the elevated guideway

Station concourse

The station's island platform

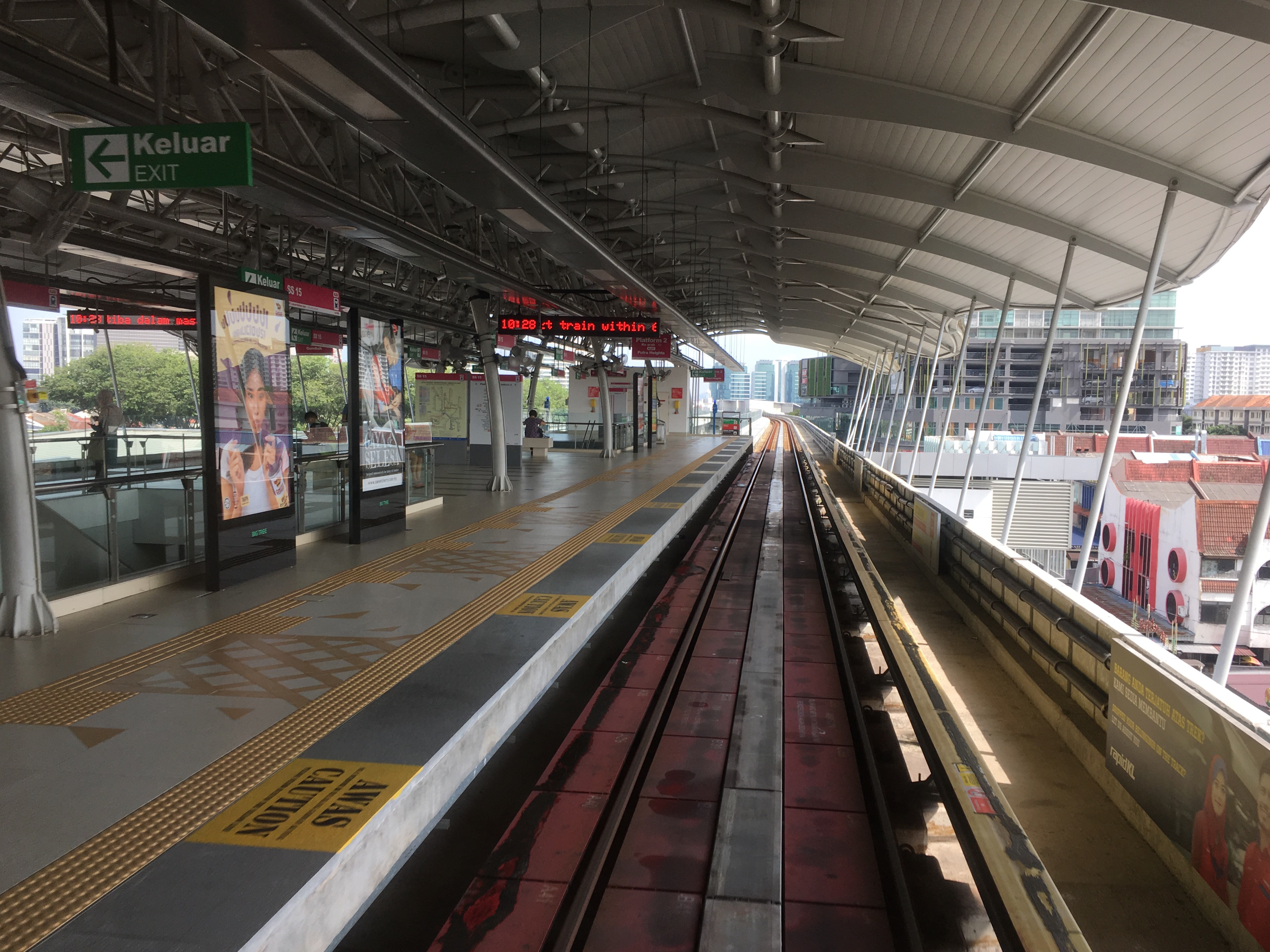
View of Platform 2 (Putra Heights-bound) of the station

SS15 Courtyard
