= SS18 LRT station =

Light rapid transit station in Subang Jaya, Selangor, Malaysia

KJ30 SS18
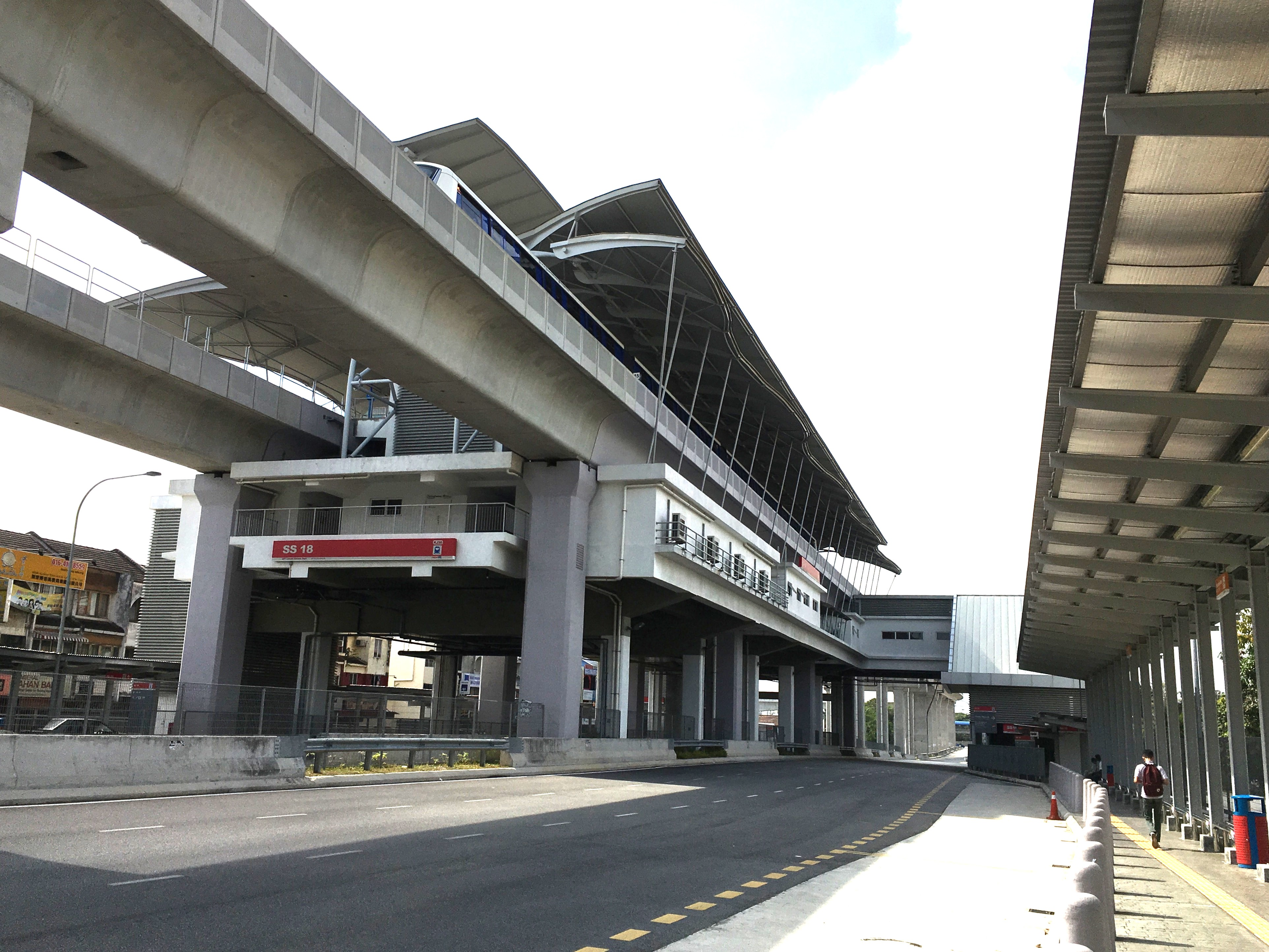

General information
- Other names: Malay: س.س. 18 (Jawi); Chinese: 梳邦－双溪威第十八区; Tamil: எஸ்எஸ் 18
- Location: Persiaran Jengka, SS18, 47500 Subang Jaya; Selangor; Malaysia
- System: Rapid KL
- Owner: Prasarana Malaysia
- Operator: Rapid Rail
- Line: 5 Kelana Jaya Line
- Platforms: 1 island platform
- Tracks: 2

Construction
- Structure type: Elevated
- Parking: Not available
- Cycle facilities: Available

Other information
- Station code: KJ30

History
- Opened: 30 June 2016; 10 years ago

Services
Preceding station		Following station
SS15 towards Gombak	Kelana Jaya Line	USJ 7 towards Putra Heights
Location

SS18 LRT station is an elevated light rapid transit (LRT) station in Subang Jaya, Selangor, Malaysia. It serves the residential neighbourhoods of SS14 and SS18, located at the southern end of Persiaran Jengka.

The station operates under the LRT Kelana Jaya Line infrastructure network, managed as part of the Klang Valley Integrated Transit System. The line was opened on 30 June 2016, under the Kelana Jaya line extension project. The platform follows a standard high-level concrete design common among rapid transit assets deployed across the region, featuring disabled-accessible ramps, elevators and tactile guiding tiles.

== Feeder bus services ==
The station is directly integrated into the local council's subsidised community transit network, providing direct point-to-point accessibility towards major commercial points within the Subang Jaya and Puchong suburb.

Route No.	Origin	Destination	Via	Connecting to
SJ02	KJ30 SS18	SP25 Pusat Bandar Puchong	New Pantai Expressway; Sunway Pyramid; Damansara-Puchong Expressway; Lotus's Puchong	600 602; SB3 Sunway Lagoon (bus route destination to KJ30 SS18 only)
