= Setia Jaya station =

Railway station in Bandar Sunway, Malaysia

Coordinates: 3°04′59″N 101°36′40″E

KD08 Setia Jaya; SB1 Sunway-Setia Jaya
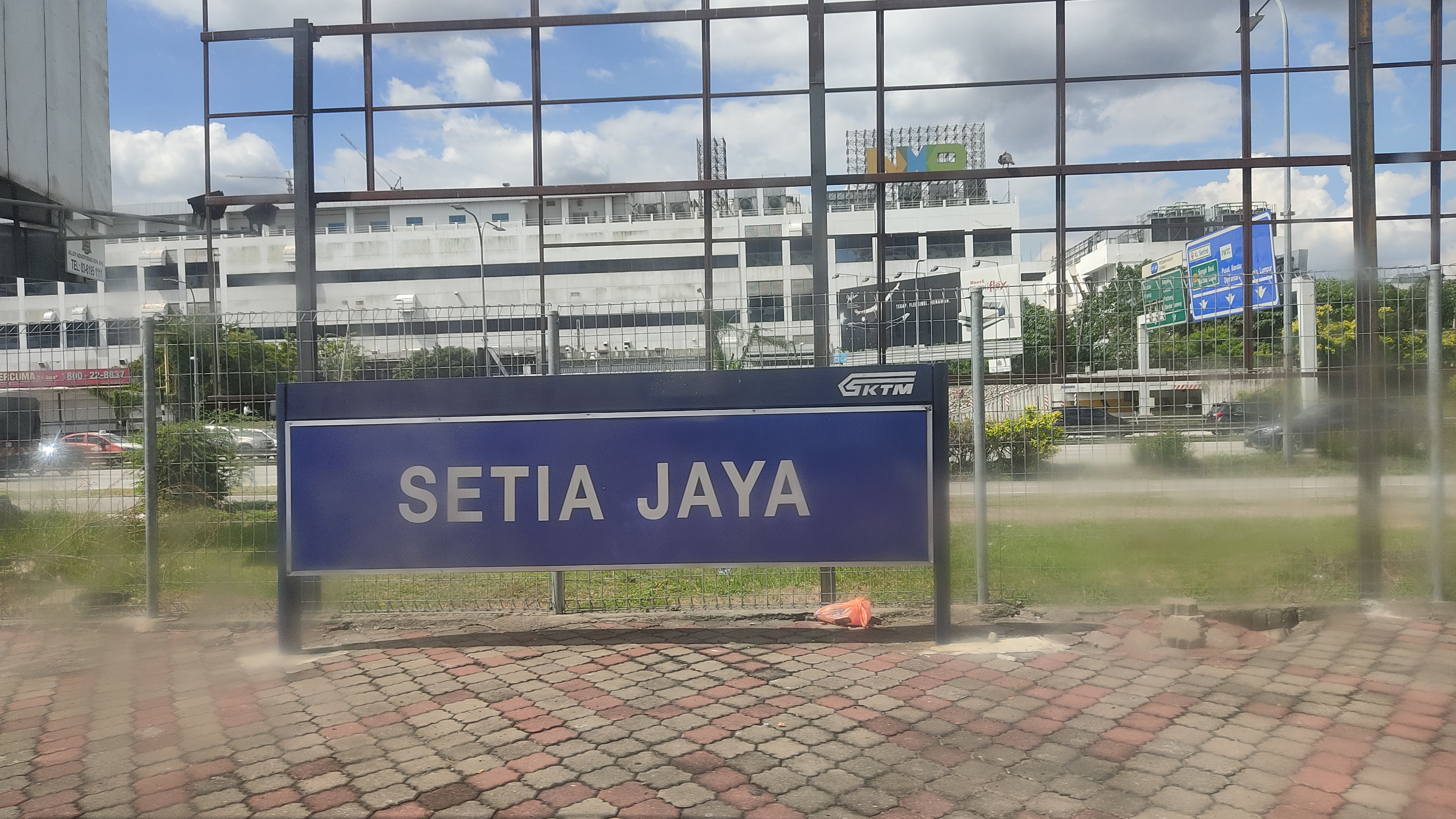

General information
- Other names: Malay: ستيا جاي (Jawi); Chinese: 斯迪亚再也; Tamil: செத்தியா ஜெயா
- Location: Bandar Sunway, Selangor; Malaysia
- System: Commuter rail and BRT station
- Operator: Keretapi Tanah Melayu (KTM Komuter); Rapid Bus (BRT)
- Lines: Port Klang Branch (KTM); Sunway Line (BRT)
- Platforms: 1 side platforms & 1 island platform
- Tracks: 3
- Connections: Integrative station between KD08 and SB1

Construction
- Structure type: KD08 Subsurface; SB1 Elevated
- Parking: Not available

Other information
- Station code: KD08 SB1

History
- Opened: 14 August 1995 (KTM Komuter); 2 May 2015 (BRT)
- Electrified: 25 kV AC railway electrification (Port Klang Line)
- Former names: Sungai Way

Services
Preceding station	Keretapi Tanah Melayu (Komuter)	Following station
Seri Setia towards Tanjung Malim	Tanjung Malim–Port Klang Line	Subang Jaya towards Port Klang
Preceding station		Following station
Mentari towards USJ 7	BRT Sunway Line	Terminus
Location

The Setia Jaya Station is a connected station located nearby Bandar Sunway and served by the KTM Port Klang Line and BRT Sunway Line. The BRT section of the station is called Sunway-Setia Jaya.

The stop is located on the junction of Federal Highway and Damansara–Puchong Expressway and within walking distance of factories in the free industrial zone. Leisure Commerce Square & Mentari Court Apartment is just behind the station. A major landmark near station would be the Freescale LDP Bridge at Damansara–Puchong Expressway.

There is no "paid area to paid area" link-up between the Port Klang Line and BRT Sunway Line and users have to exit the paid area of one system and enter the paid area of the other when transferring.

The KL Sentral–Terminal Skypark Line passes through, but does not stop at this station. Skypark Link trains stop at the adjacent Subang Jaya station instead.

== Name ==
The station was known as Sungai Way Station in the 1980s. while the new name “Setia Jaya” originate from Seri Setia (Sungai Way) new village, and “Jaya” means victory in Malay language and also from Petaling Jaya.

== Gallery ==
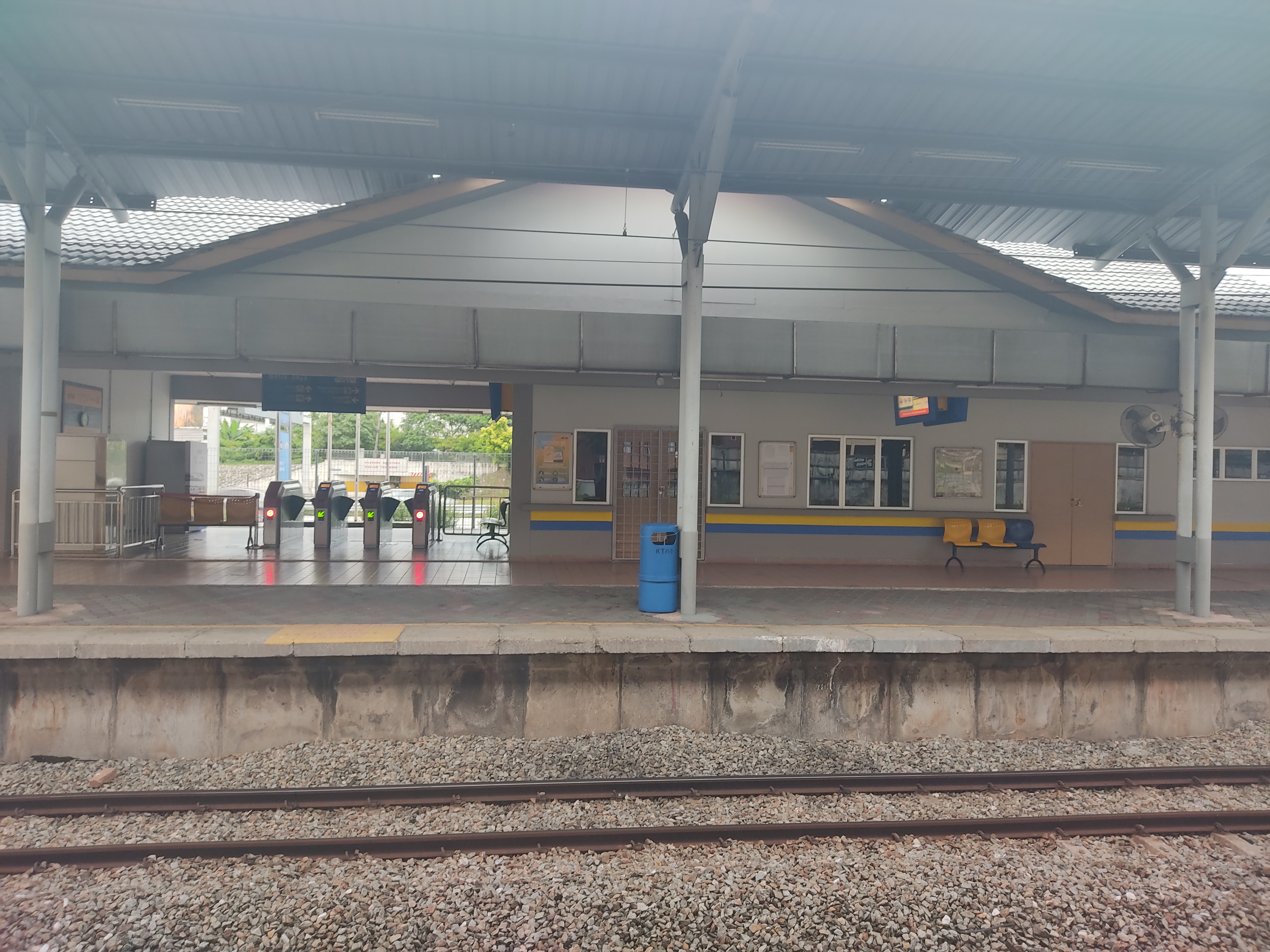
Station building and faregates

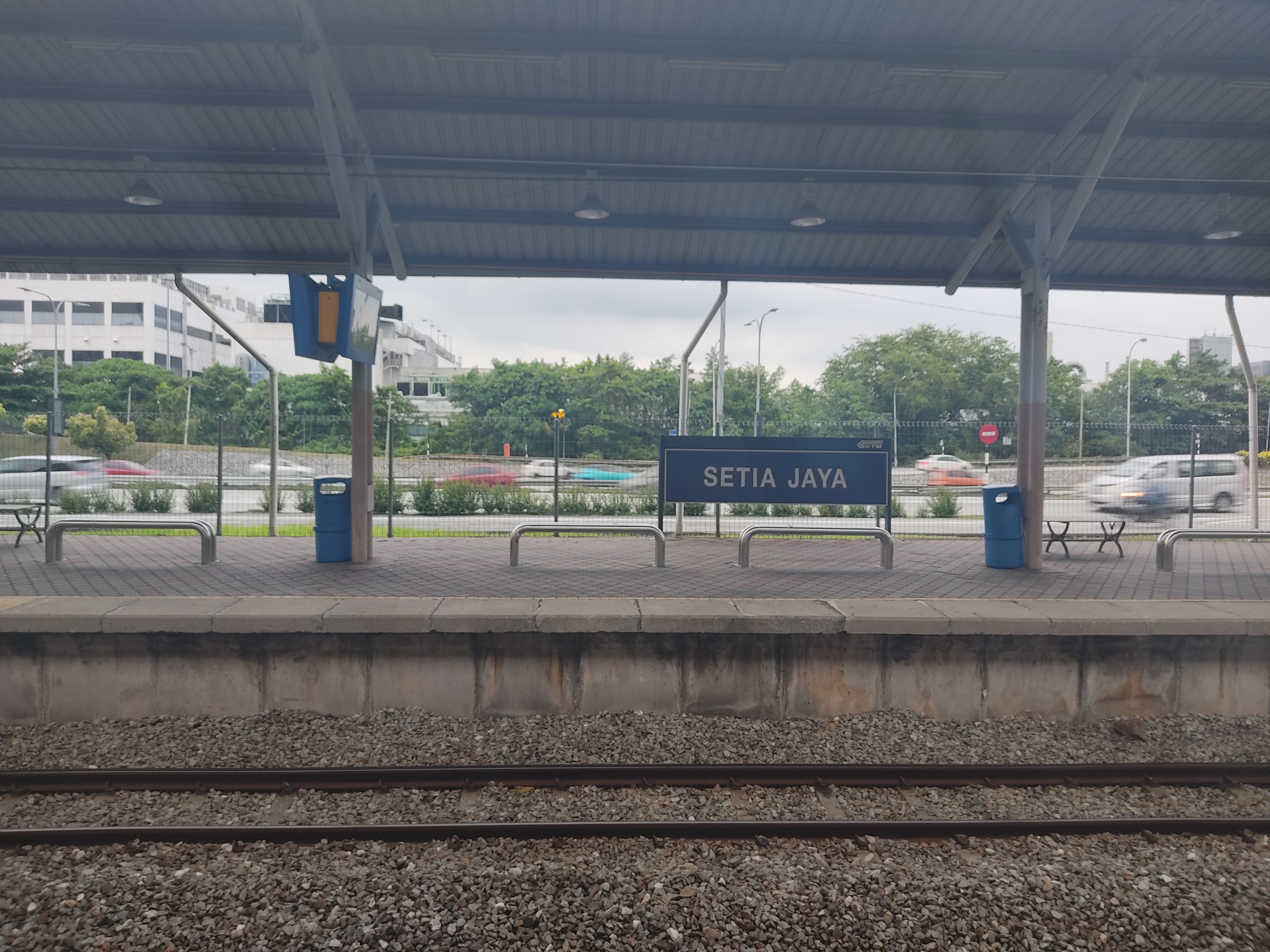
another station signboard

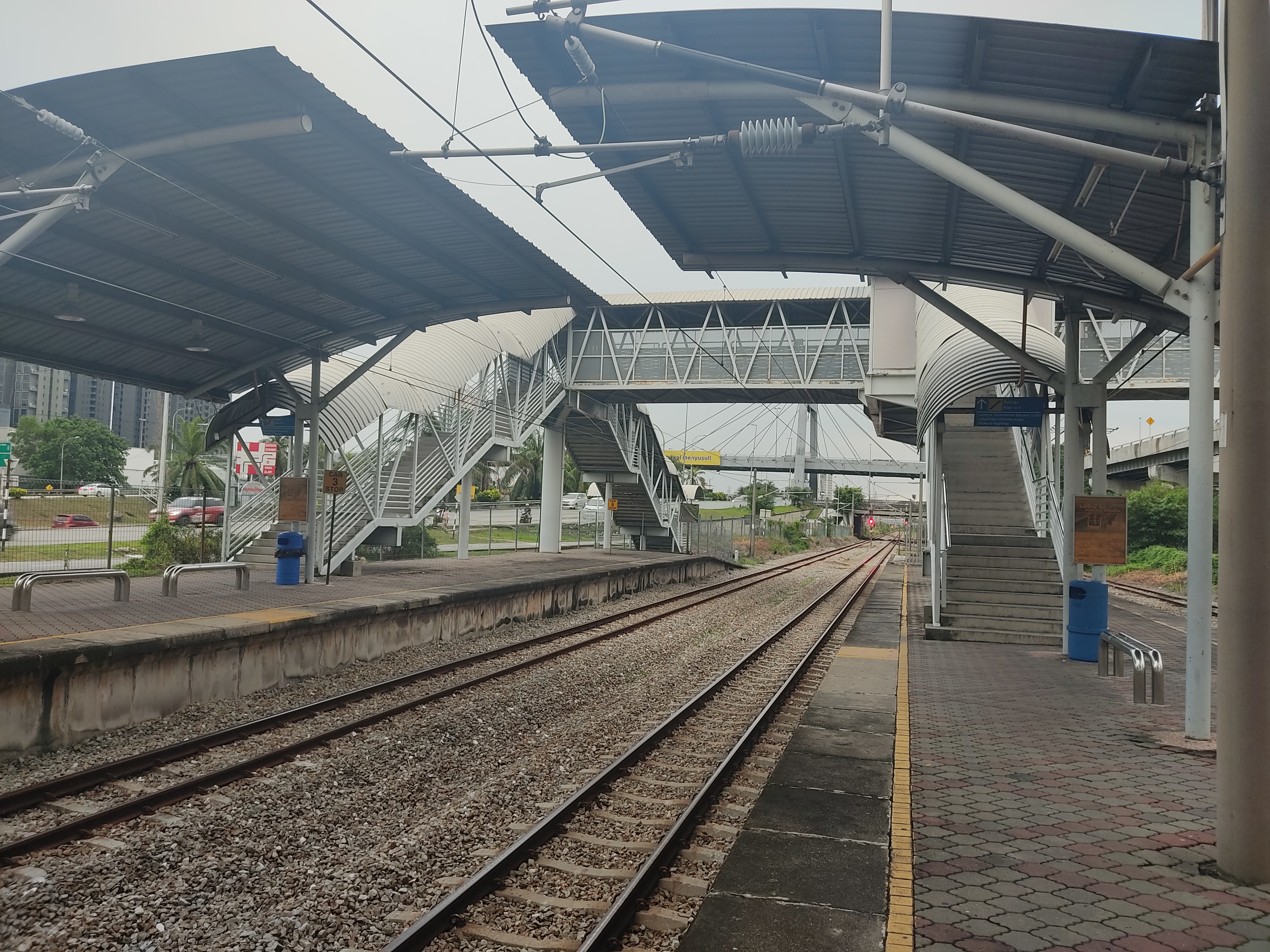
Platform of Setia Jaya station

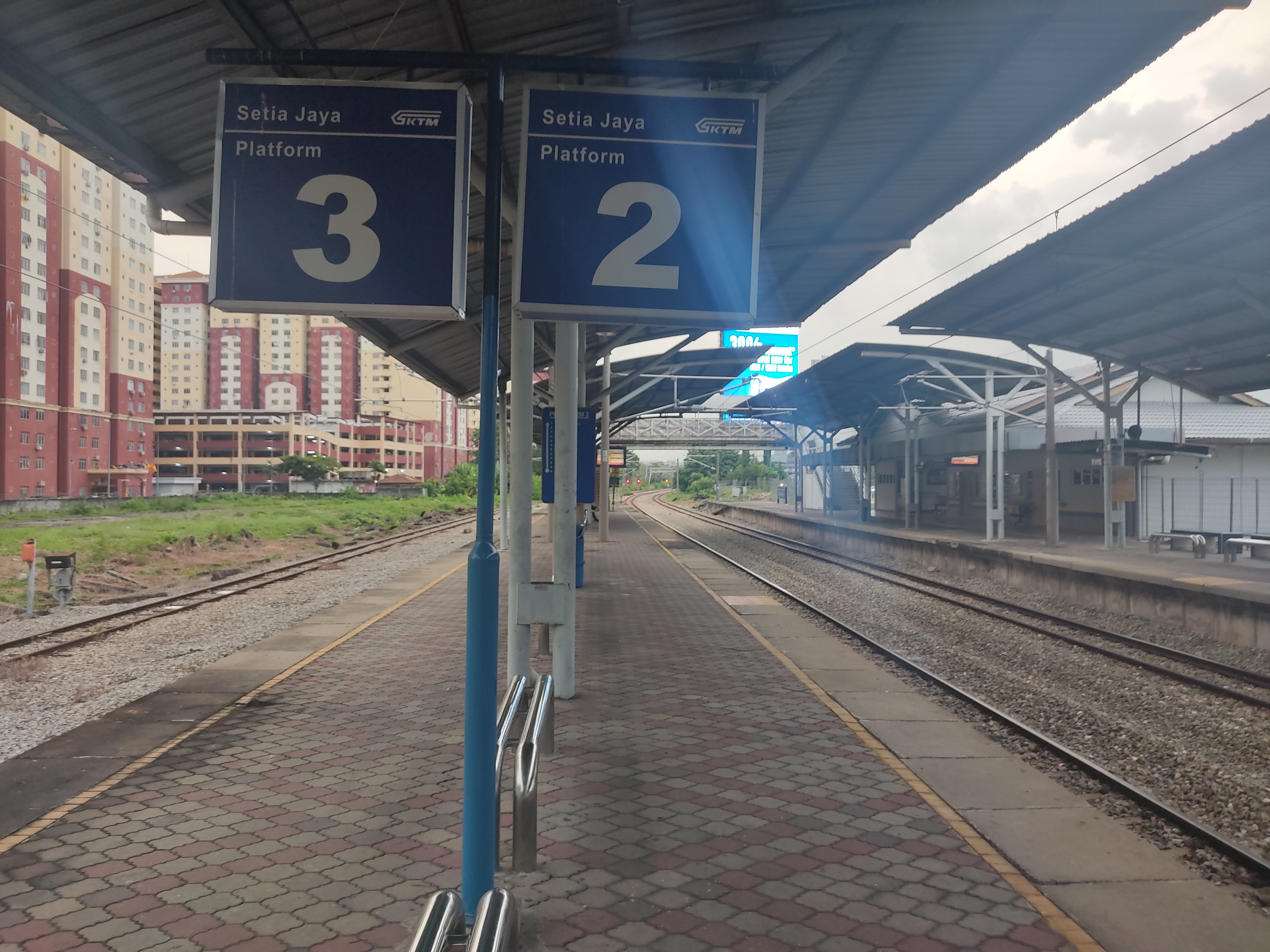
Platform 2 and 3 (not in use) of Setia Jaya station

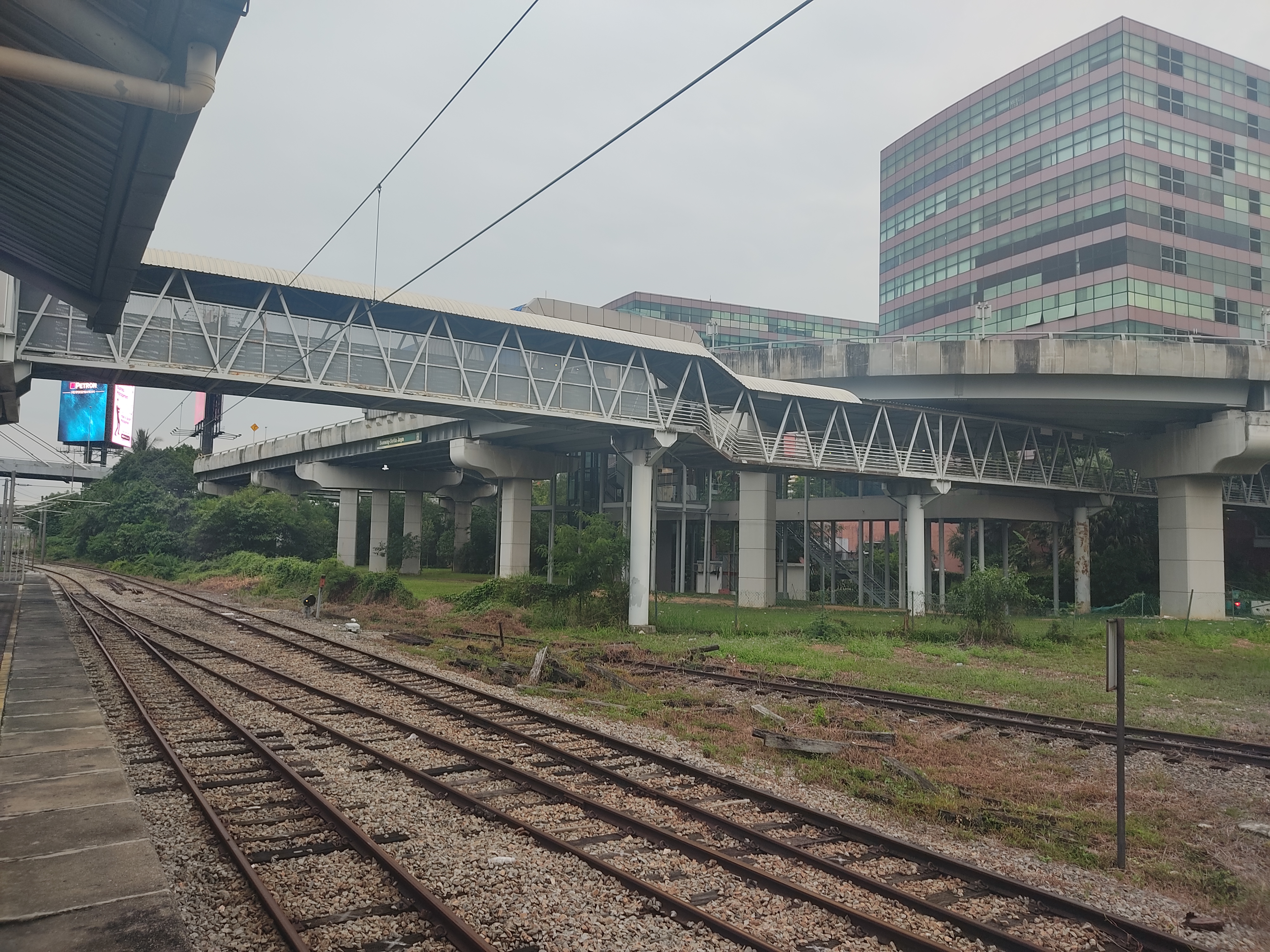
Pedestrian bridge connecting platforms and the BRT station

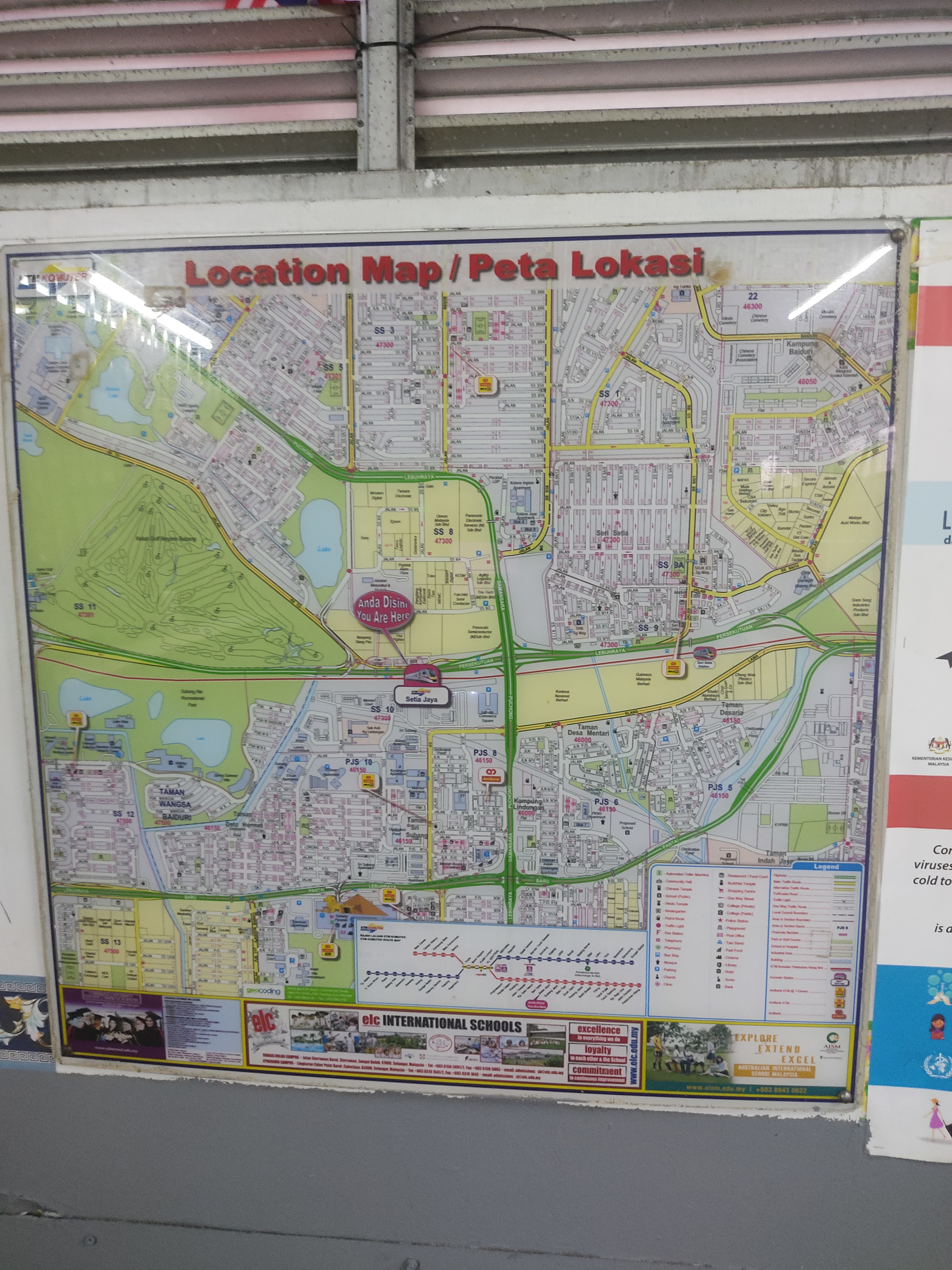
Location map of Setia Jaya station

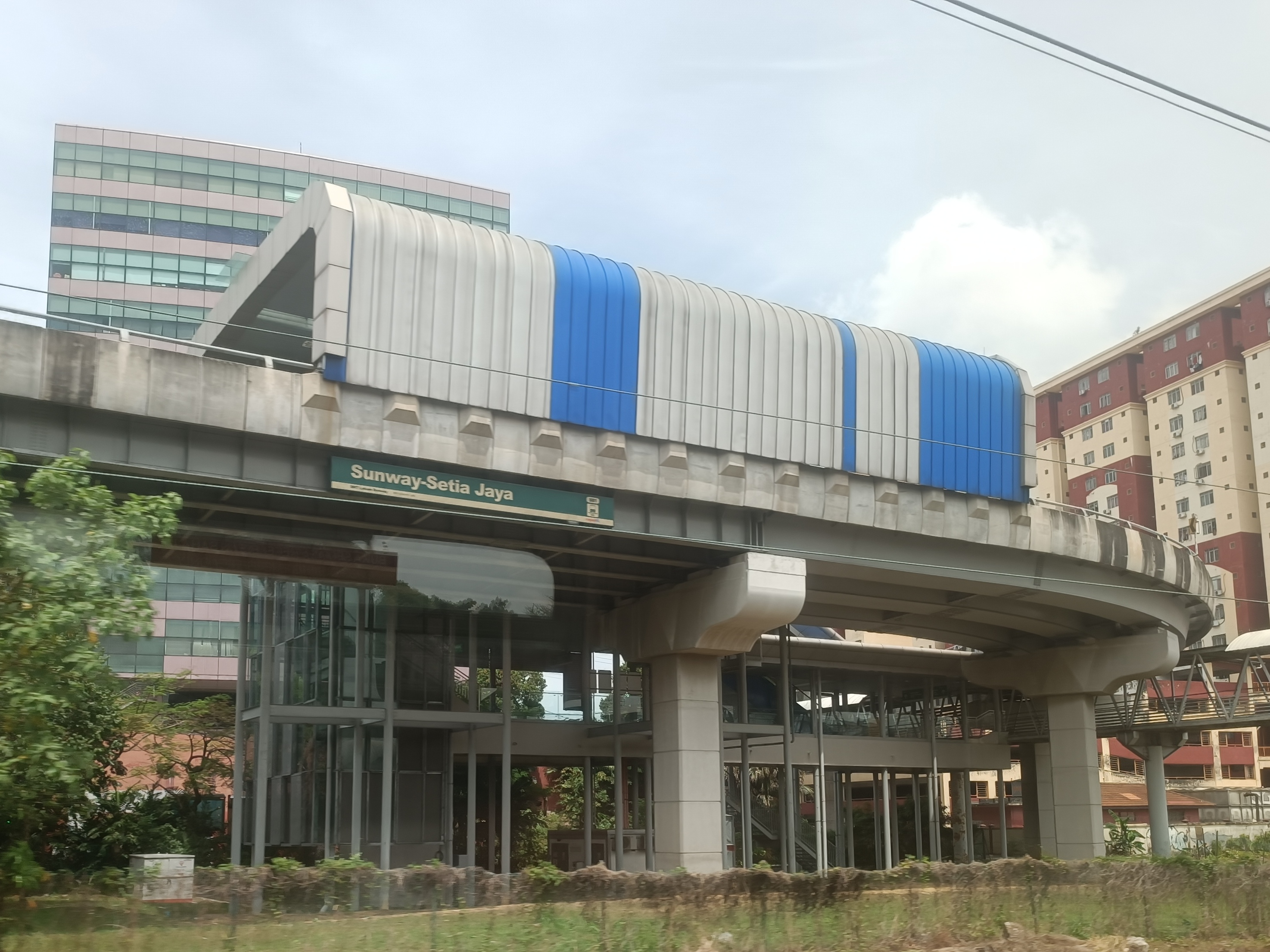
The structure of Sunway-Setia Jaya BRT station.
