= Empire Subang =

Shopping mall in Petaling, Selangor, Malaysia

Coordinates: 3°04′55.2″N 101°34′57.3″E

NU Empire
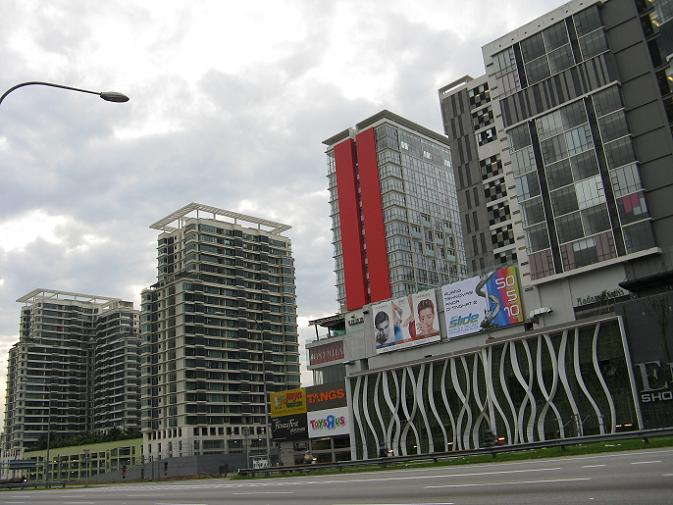
- View of NU Empire from Federal Highway
- Location: Subang Jaya, Selangor, Malaysia
- Opened: 28 September 2010
- Manager: Pelaburan Hartanah Berhad
- Owner: Pelaburan Hartanah Berhad
- Num. of stores: 180
- Num. of anchor tenants: 7
- Public transit: KJ28 KD09 Subang Jaya railway station
- Website: esg.com.my

Empire Subang is a mixed-commercial development located in Subang Jaya, Selangor, Malaysia which comprises soho office towers, an upscale shopping mall and a 4-star hotel. It is located in the downtown area of Subang Jaya, near Subang Parade, Wisma Consplant (formerly the HQ for oil palm giant Sime Darby Plantation) and the Subang Jaya railway station. The building is categorized into four sections, notably Empire Soho, Empire Tower, Empire Hotel and Empire Shopping Gallery. Empire Shopping Gallery and Empire Hotel were opened in 2010. Empire Shopping Gallery has recently changed its name to Nu Empire in July 2023 following its change of management.

== NU Empire ==
NU Empire is an upscale shopping centre. The mall is five storeys high and comprises 180 stores. There is also a slide called Lex Slide which was imported from Germany and stood 50 meters tall and ran through 5 floors. The slide was removed in January 2013 due to the end of a contract between the mall and the company which produced the slide. Jaya Grocer, ESH, Popular Bookstore, and Anytime Fitness serve as the junior anchor tenants in the mall. There is a wide variety of dining restaurants such as Black Bixon, Chili's, Madam Kwan, Marutama Ramen and Serai among others. The mall recently changed its name to Nu Empire in July 2023.

== Empire Hotel Subang ==
Empire Hotel Subang is a 4-star business hotel with 198 rooms. It is 13-storeys high and consists of a multi-purpose convention hall, a few restaurants and a cafe.

== 2011 explosion ==
On 28 September 2011, an explosion occurred at the mall at 3:45am. The fire department believed that the explosion was caused by a gas leak. The mall reopened on 15 November 2011 after almost two months of repairs and further safety measures were taken. Four people were injured in the incident and many luxury cars were damaged. Some damage was also seen at Wisma Consplant located opposite the mall.
