= Subang Jaya station =

Railway station in Subang Jaya, Selangor, Malaysia

KD09 KS02 KJ28 Subang Jaya
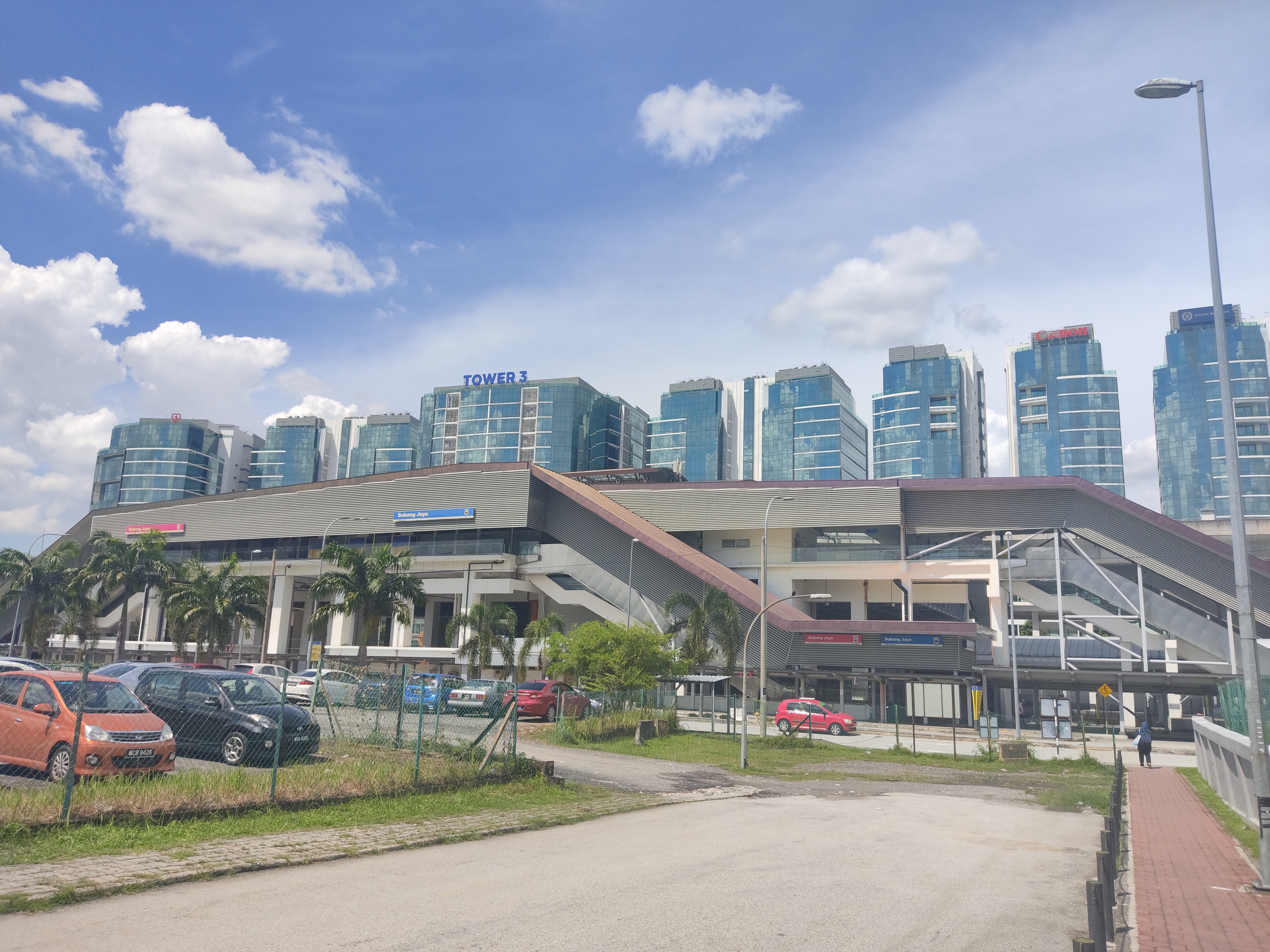
- Exterior view of the station

General information
- Other names: Malay: سوبڠ جاي (Jawi); Chinese: 梳邦再也; Tamil: சுபாங் ஜெயா
- Location: Jalan SS16/1, SS16, 47500 Subang Jaya; Selangor; Malaysia
- Coordinates: 3°05′05″N 101°35′17″E
- System: Rapid KL (LRT)
- Owner: Railway Assets Corporation (KTM); Prasarana Malaysia (LRT)
- Operator: Keretapi Tanah Melayu (KTM); Rapid Rail (LRT)
- Lines: Port Klang Branch (West Coast Line); 5 Kelana Jaya Line
- Platforms: 2 side platforms (KTM); 1 island platform (LRT)
- Tracks: 4 (KTM); 2 (LRT)

Construction
- Structure type: KD09 KS02 Surface; KJ28 Elevated
- Parking: Available

Other information
- Station code: KD09 KS02 KJ28

History
- Opened: 14 August 1995; 31 years ago (Tanjung Malim–Port Klang Line); 30 June 2016; 10 years ago (LRT); 1 May 2018; 8 years ago (KL Sentral–Terminal Skypark Line)

Services
Preceding station	KTM Komuter	Following station
Setia Jaya towards Tanjung Malim	Tanjung Malim–Port Klang Line	Batu Tiga towards Port Klang
Kuala Lumpur Sentral Terminus	KL Sentral–Terminal Skypark Line	Terminal Skypark Terminus
Preceding station		Following station
Glenmarie towards Gombak	Kelana Jaya Line	SS15 towards Putra Heights
Location

Subang Jaya station is an integrated railway station located in SS16, Subang Jaya, Selangor, Malaysia. It is served by KTM Komuter's Tanjung Malim-Port Klang Line and KL Sentral–Terminal Skypark Line, as well as the LRT Kelana Jaya Line.

The station is situated at the city centre of Subang Jaya behind Subang Parade and AEON Big Subang Jaya. It is a popular train and bus hub and is commonly used by college students for travel to and from colleges and universities like SEGi College Subang Jaya, Taylor's University, Monash University, INTI College, UOW Malaysia and Sunway University. The journey time to KL Sentral from this station is approximately 30 minutes. Buses that offer services from the station include Bas Selangorku and Rapid KL.

== History ==
=== Kelana Jaya Line extension ===
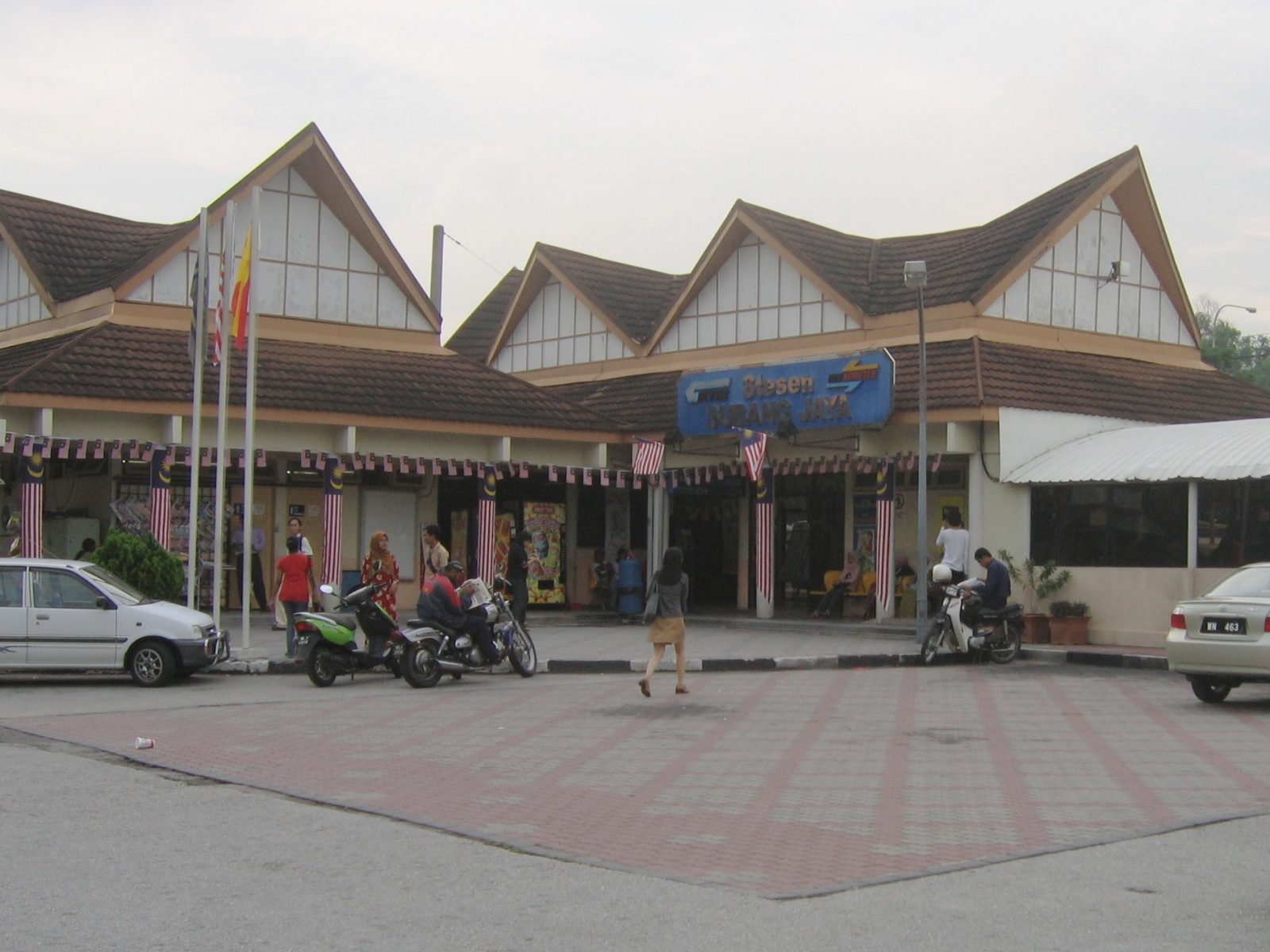
The former Subang Jaya KTM station before being integrated with the LRT

As part of the Rapid KL LRT Extension Project, the Kelana Jaya Line was extended by 17 km to Putra Heights through Subang Jaya and UEP Subang Jaya (USJ). The Subang Jaya station allows passengers to interchange between the KTM Komuter network and the LRT. The Kelana Jaya Line extension was opened on 30 June 2016. Passengers wishing to change between the lines need to exit the paid areas of both services as they have different fare collection systems.

=== Skypark Link extension ===
An 8.15 km branch line of the Tanjung Malim-Port Klang Line was constructed from Subang Jaya to the Terminal Skypark Komuter station at Sultan Abdul Aziz Shah Airport (Subang Airport), providing a rail link to the airport when it opened on 1 May 2018. The service, now known as the KL Sentral–Terminal Skypark Line, connects the airport directly to KL Sentral via this station. However, due to low ridership, the line temporarily suspended operations since February 2023, with operations expected to resume after the Subang Airport Regeneration Plan.

=== KTM ETS ===
On January 2027, Subang Jaya will become a new terminus for the KTM ETS. There will be four ETS trains to and from this station: one evening service from Butterworth, one morning service to JB Sentral, one morning service to Butterworth, and one afternoon service from JB Sentral.

== Location ==
This station is in the SS16 neighbourhood of Subang Jaya, Selangor, around 100 metres from the Federal Highway on Federal Route 2. Major landmarks around the station include the UOA Business Park, Subang Avenue Hotel, Saujana Residency, the SS15 commercial area, and the Subang Parade and Aeon Big Subang shopping centres.

== Station features ==
The KTM part of this station is at-grade, and the LRT part is elevated. Both services are operated under one integrated station building, but because they are operated by different companies, there is no paid-to-paid area integration. Both the station's entrance and exit, and the KTM platforms, are on the ground floor, but each of them are accessed separately on the first floor, where the integrated concourse is. The LRT platforms are on the second floor. This station also has a bicycle rack that can hold up to 20 bicycles.

L2
LRT Platform

Level

→ Platform 2: 5 Kelana Jaya Line towards KJ37 Putra Heights (SS15)
Island platform, doors will open on the right
← Platform 1: 5 Kelana Jaya Line towards KJ1 Gombak (Glenmarie)
L1
Concourse
Faregates to paid area, escalators, lifts, ticketing machines, customer service counter, connecting passageway between LRT and KTM platforms
G
KTM Platform Level
Side platform, doors will open on the left

← Platform 2: 2 Tanjung Malim–Port Klang Line towards KA15 Tanjung Malim (Setia Jaya)

← Platform 2: 10 KL Sentral–Terminal Skypark Line towards KS01 KL Sentral

Express track, trains do not stop here

Express track, trains do not stop here

← Platform 1: 2 Tanjung Malim–Port Klang Line towards KD19 Port Klang (Batu Tiga)

← Platform 1: 10 KL Sentral–Terminal Skypark Line towards KS03 Terminal Skypark

Side platform, doors will open on the left

Ground Level
Feeder Bus Stop, Taxi Lay-By

The LRT platform of the station

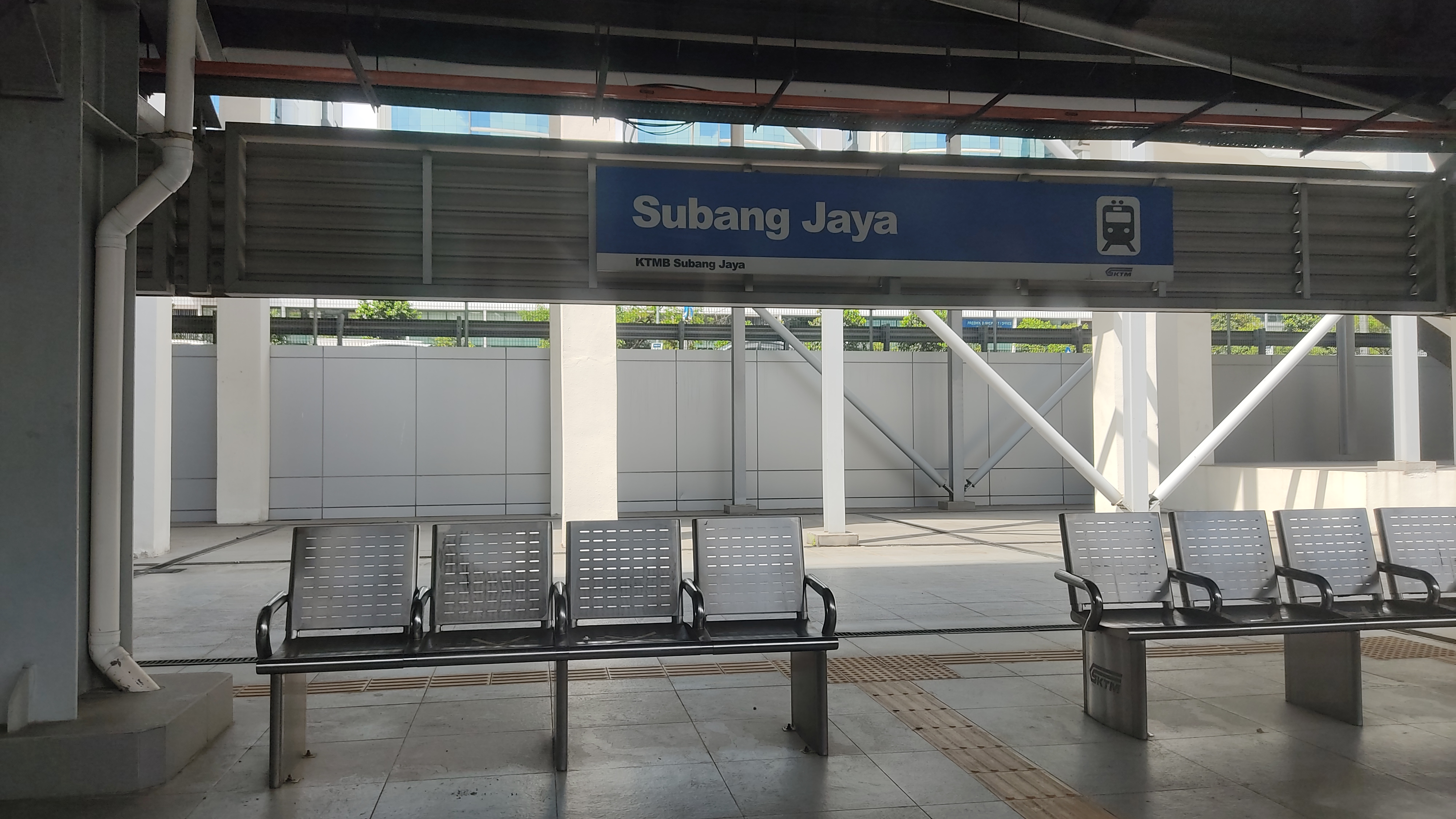
The KTM platform of the station

== Bus services ==
=== Feeder buses ===
Route No.	Origin	Destination	Via	Connecting to
T770	KD09 KS02 KJ28 Subang Jaya	Sunway Pyramid	AEON Big Subang Jaya; Subang Parade; KJ29 SS15; New Pantai Expressway	641, 770, 771, 783, BET4, SJ02

=== Other buses ===
Route No.	Origin	Destination	Via	Connecting to
641	KJ14 KG16 Pasar Seni	KD09 KS02 KJ28 Subang Jaya	Jalan Tun Tan Cheng Lock; Jalan Tun Sambanthan (KL Sentral); Jalan Syed Putra (Mid Valley City); Jalan Klang Lama; PJS 2 Desa Mentari; Sunway Pyramid; Subang Jaya Medical Center (SJMC); AEON Big Subang Jaya; Subang Parade	T770
708	Sunway Pyramid	Jalan Pasar, Klang	Sunway Pyramid; Subang Jaya Medical Center (SJMC); AEON Big Subang Jaya; Subang Parade; FT 2 Federal Highway; Batu Tiga; Lotus's Shah Alam; Istana Kayangan; Hentian Bandar Shah Alam; Kompleks PKNS; Wet World Shah Alam; UiTM Section 2, Shah Alam; UNISEL; Section 7, Shah Alam; Hospital Shah Alam; Jakel Shah Alam; Sungai Rasau Toll Plaza; Hotel Gold Coast; Bank Simpanan Nasional (BSN)	700, 701, 702, 703, 704, 705, 706, 707, 710, 730, T700, T701, T702, T703, T707, T708, T709, T710, T712, T713, T714
771	SB2 Mentari	Subang Mewah, USJ 1	Sunway Pyramid; Subang Jaya Medical Center (SJMC); AEON Big Subang Jaya; Subang Parade; Masjid Darul Ehsan SS15; KJ29 SS15; First Subang; USJ 2, 3 & 4 Persiaran Tujuan; USJ 9, 11, 12; Jalan Mulia (USJ 14); Subang Perdana Goodyear Court 6, 7, 8, 9 & 10; Angsana Apartment; Masjid Al-Irsyad, USJ 1 SJK (C) Chee Wen	770, BET3, T776
783	Sunway Pyramid	KJ24 Kelana Jaya	Sunway Pyramid; Subang Jaya Medical Center (SJMC); AEON Big Subang Jaya; Subang Parade; Federal Highway; Nanyang Siang Pau, Batu 10; Damansara–Puchong Expressway; Giant Hypermarket; Paradigm Mall	506, 802, T780, T781
SJ01	KD09 KS02 KJ28 Subang Jaya	KJ31 SB7 USJ 7		770, BET3, T776

== Gallery ==
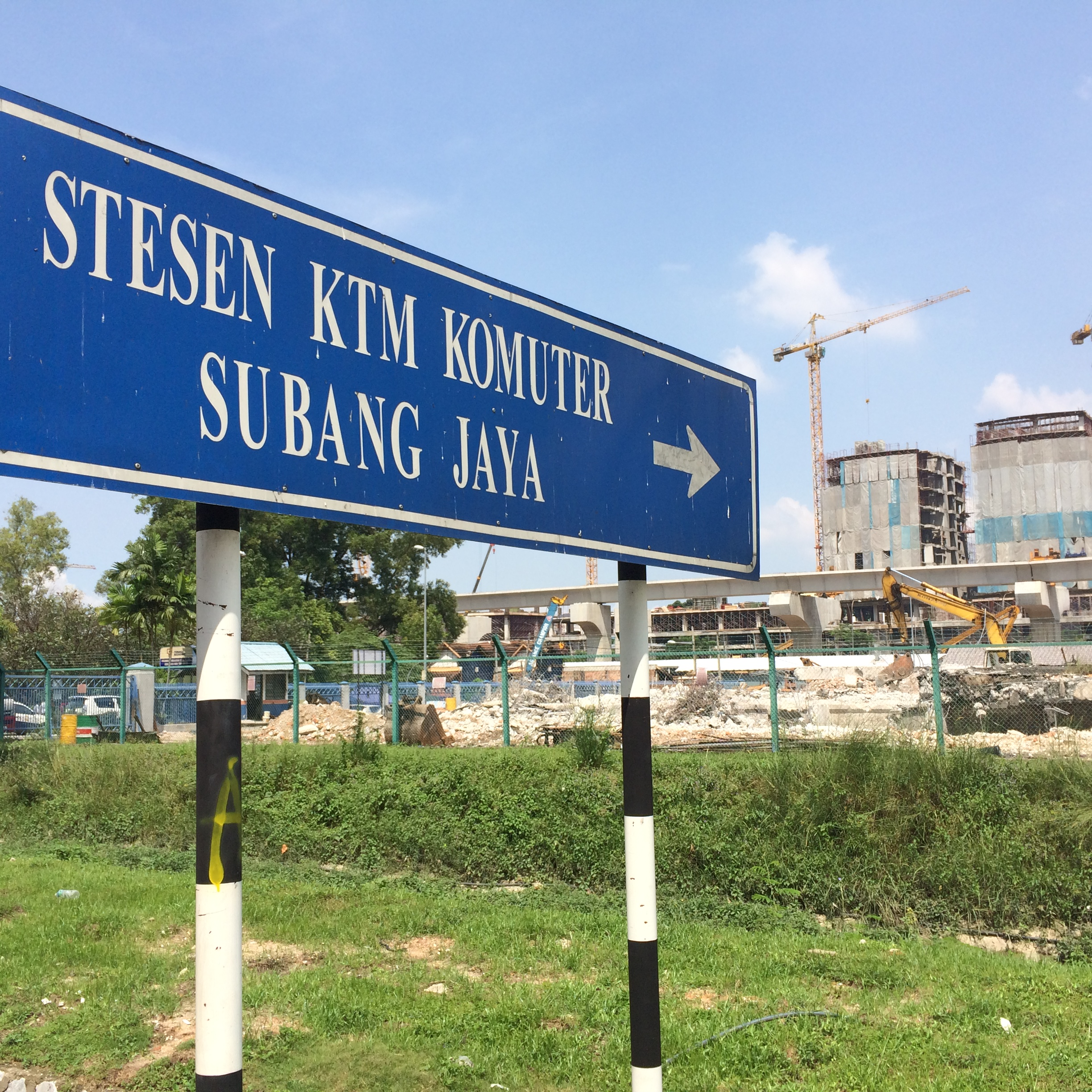
Former Subang Jaya KTM station signage

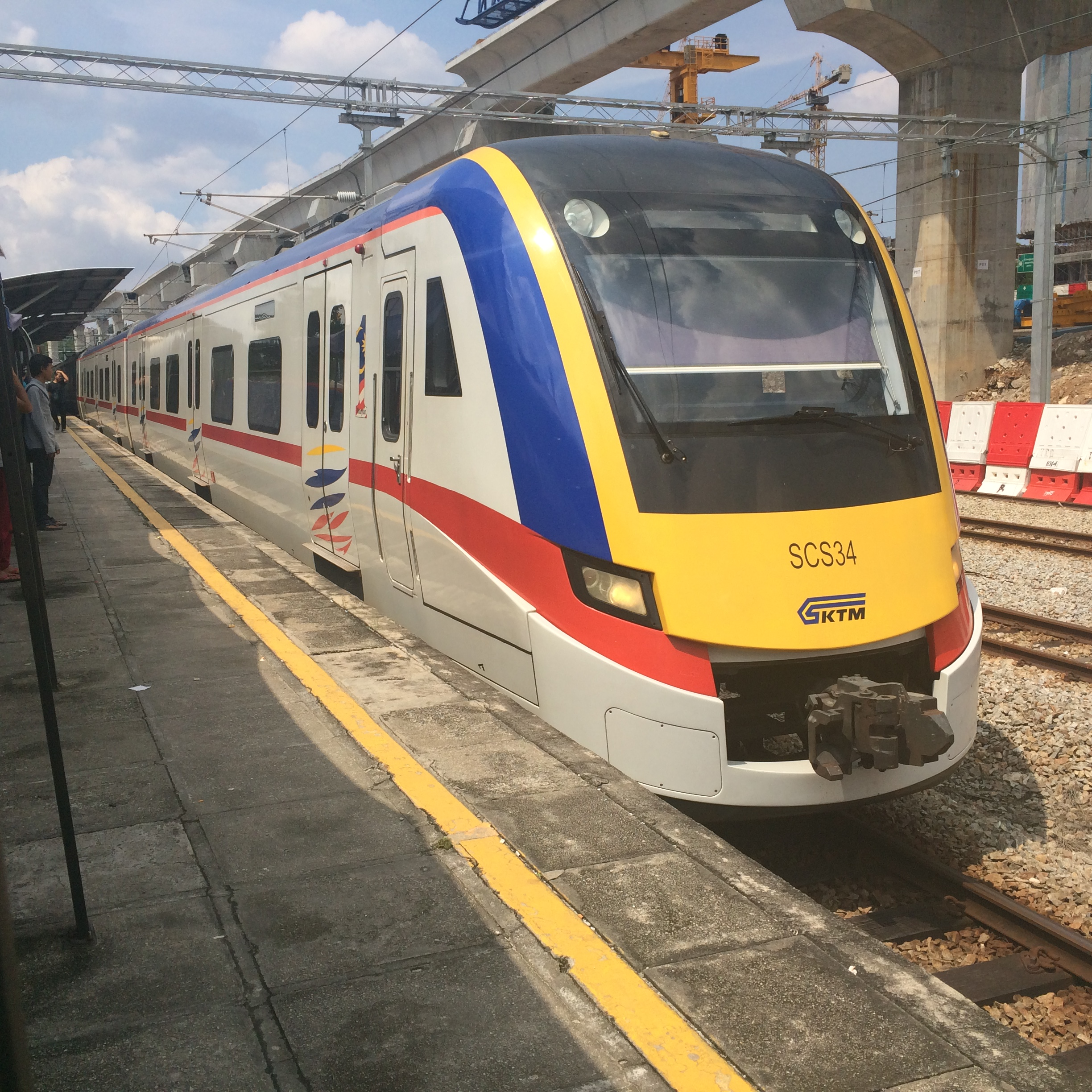
KTM Komuter train at Subang Jaya

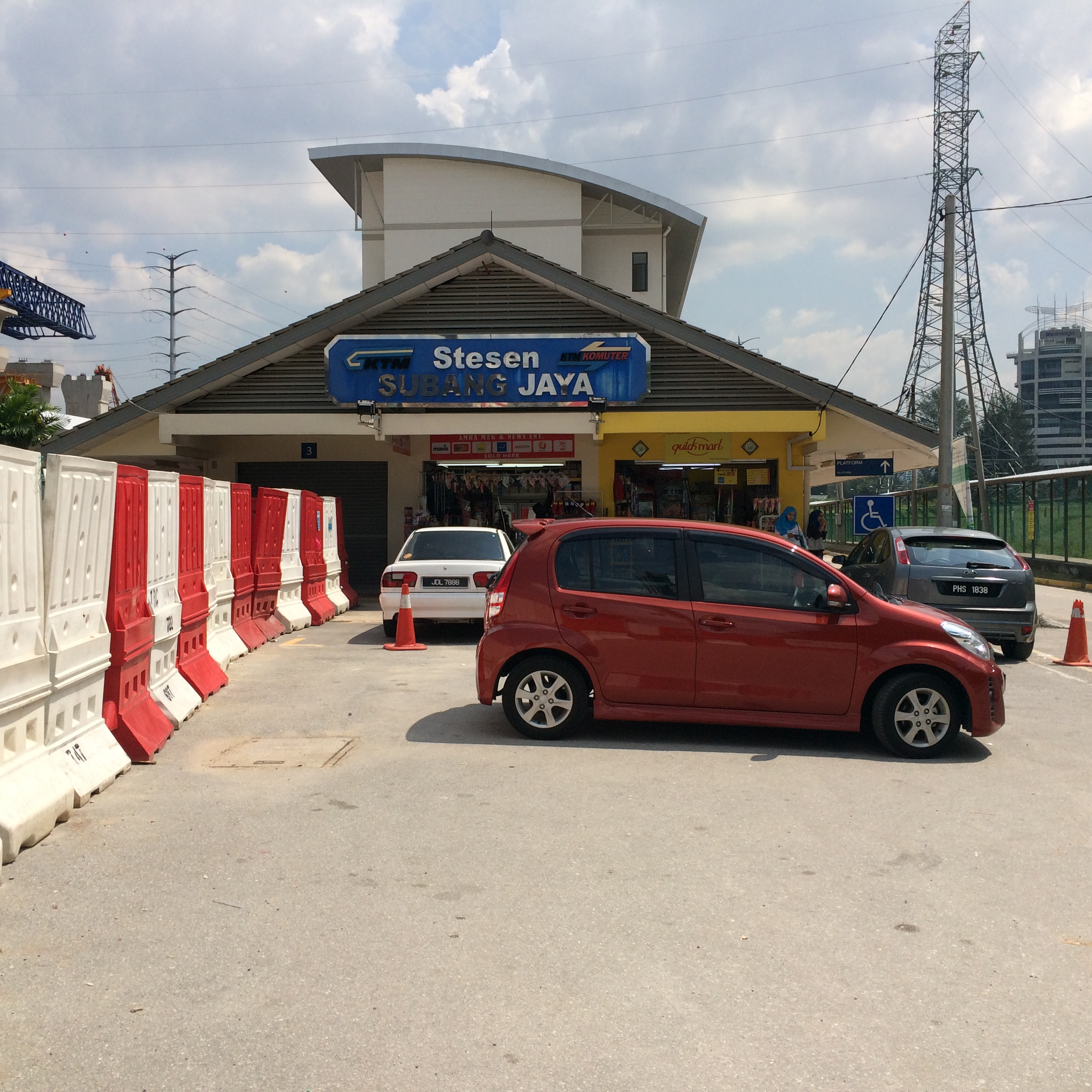
Former Subang Jaya KTM station

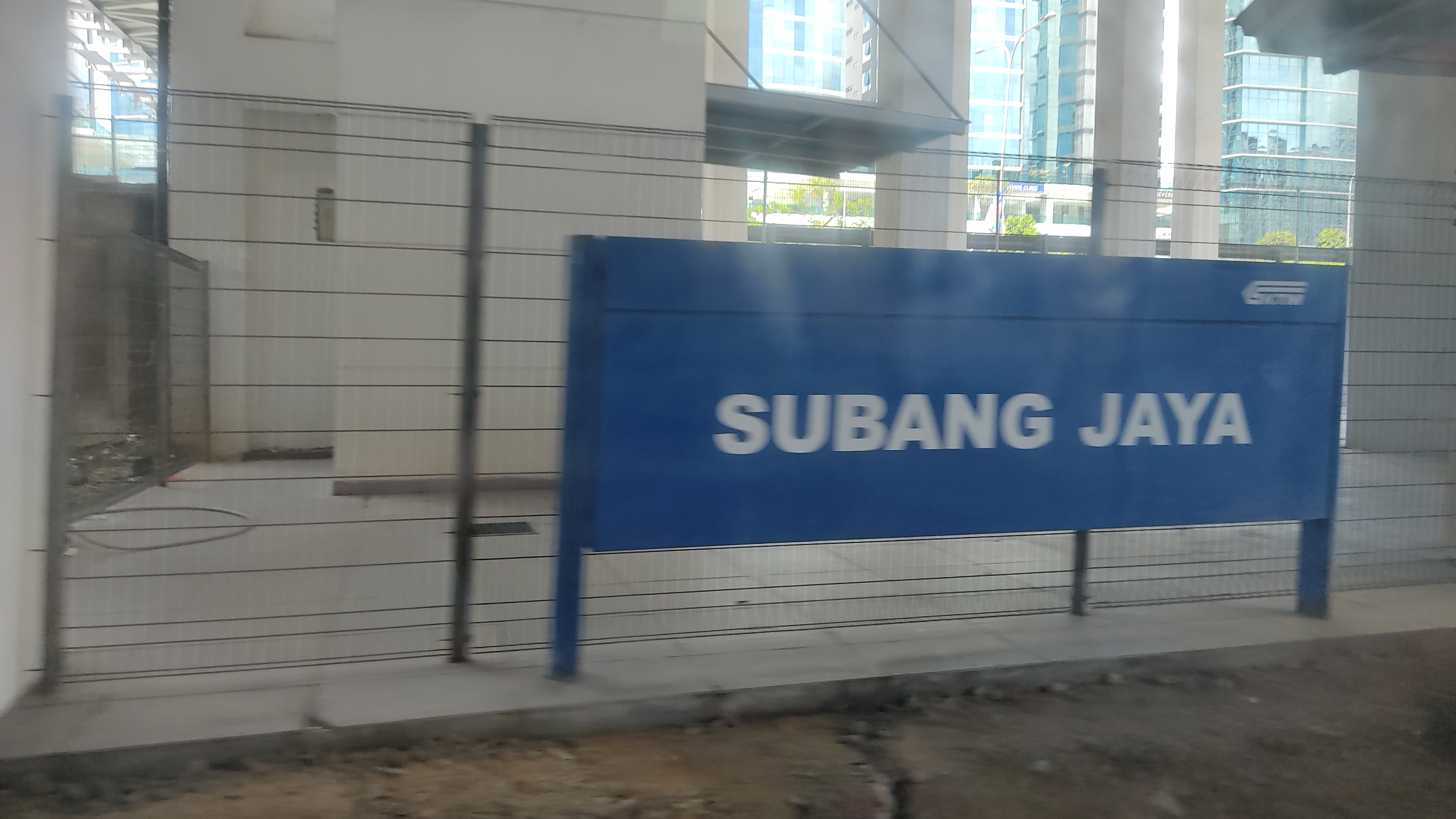
Subang Jaya KTM station signboard

== Around the station ==
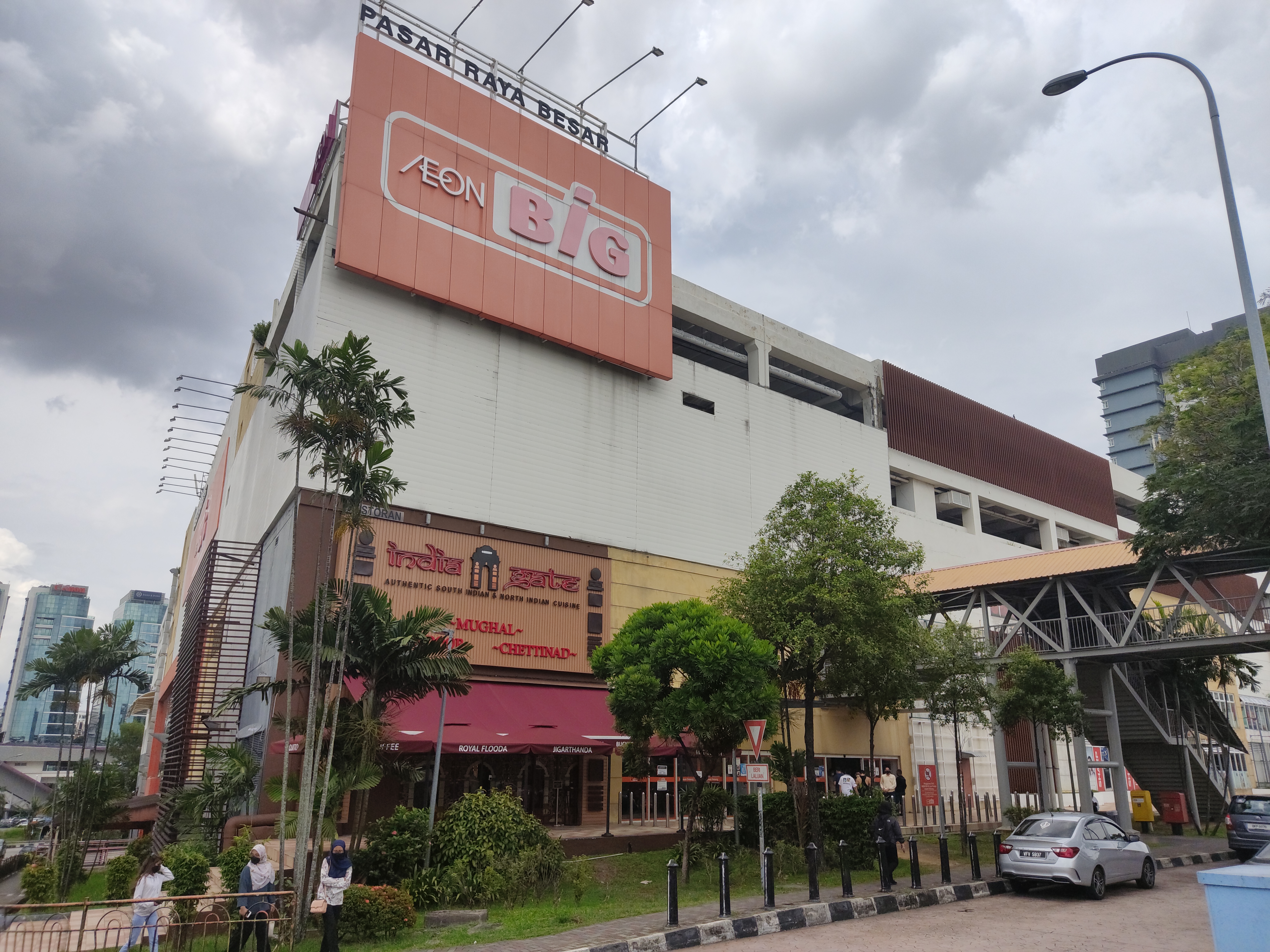
AEON Big Subang Jaya

- AEON Big Subang Jaya
- ALFA International College
- Empire Subang
- Monash University
- Subang Parade
- Taylor's University

== See also ==
- Similar layout:
  - KD01 KJ17 Abdullah Hukum
  - KA08 PY04 Sungai Buloh
  - KB06 KG35 Kajang
- Similar function:
  - KB04 SP15 KT2 Bandar Tasik Selatan - integrated station between commuter rail, inter-city rail, LRT and airport rail link
  - KT3 PY41 Putrajaya Sentral - airport rail link and MRT station
