= USJ 7 station =

Integrated transit station in Subang Jaya, Selangor, Malaysia

KJ31 SB7 USJ 7
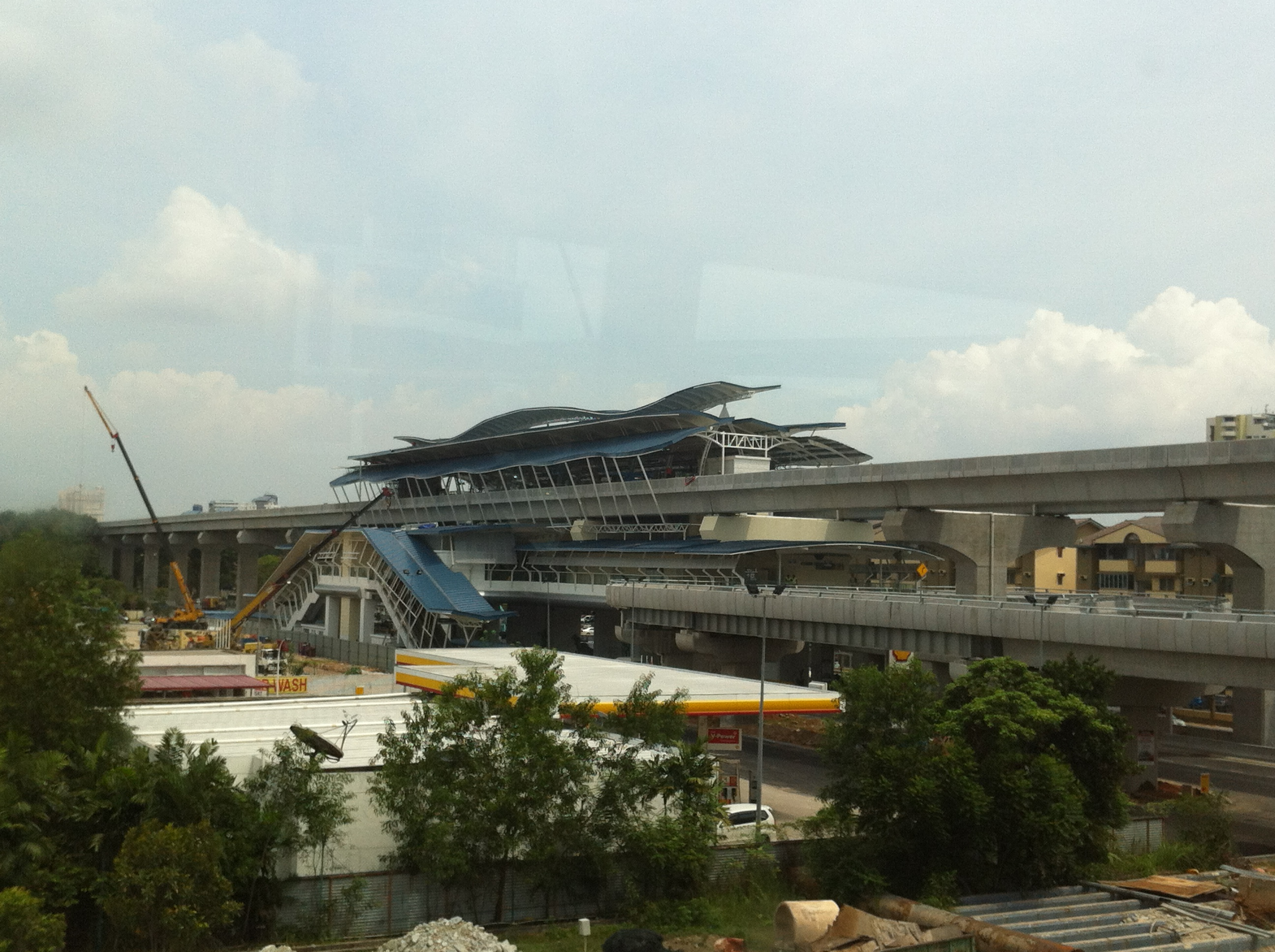
- Exterior view of the station

General information
- Other names: Malay: يو.ايس.جيه. توجوه (Jawi); Tamil: யூஎஸ்ஜே 7
- Location: Persiaran Kewajipan, USJ 7, UEP Subang Jaya, 47610 Subang Jaya; Selangor; Malaysia
- Coordinates: 3.054888°N 101.591880°E
- System: Rapid KL
- Owner: Prasarana Malaysia
- Operator: Rapid Rail (LRT); Rapid Bus (BRT)
- Lines: 5 Kelana Jaya Line; B1 BRT Sunway Line
- Platforms: 1 island platform (LRT); 1 side platform (BRT)
- Tracks: 2 standard-gauge rail tracks (LRT); 1 elevated guideway (BRT)

Construction
- Structure type: KJ31 SB7 Elevated
- Parking: Available

Other information
- Station code: KJ31 SB7

History
- Opened: 2 June 2015; 11 years ago (BRT); 30 June 2016; 10 years ago (LRT)

Services
Preceding station		Following station
SS18 towards Gombak	Kelana Jaya Line	Taipan towards Putra Heights
Terminus	BRT Sunway Line	South Quay-USJ 1 towards Sunway-Setia Jaya
Location

USJ 7 station is an integrated transit station in Subang Jaya, Selangor, Malaysia. It is served by the LRT Kelana Jaya Line and the BRT Sunway Line. The station is named after the USJ 7 neighbourhood of UEP Subang Jaya, which is located east of the station.

This station was opened when the BRT Sunway Line started operations on 2 June 2015. Later, the LRT Kelana Jaya Line portion of the station opened on 30 June 2016. The station acts as an interchange station for the BRT and LRT lines.

== Bus services ==
=== Feeder buses ===
Route No.	Origin	Destination	Via
T776	KJ31 SB7 USJ 7	Subang Mewah, USJ 1	KJ32 Taipan; USJ 8 Police Station; Masjid Al-Falah USJ 9 Jalan Mulia (USJ 14); Subang Perdana Goodyear Court 6, 7, 8, 9 & 10; Angsana Apartment; Masjid Al-Irsyad, USJ 1 SJK (C) Chee Wen; Taman Subang Mewah; Mydin Hypermarket

=== Other buses ===
Route No.	Origin	Destination	Via
770	KJ14 KG16 Pasar Seni	USJ 1, Subang Mewah	Jalan Tun Tan Cheng Lock; Jalan Tun Sambanthan (KL Sentral); Jalan Syed Putra (Mid Valley); Federal Highway; Damansara-Puchong Expressway (Kampung Lindungan); Pantai Baharu Expressway (Sunway Pyramid); Persiaran Kewajipan; Summit USJ; KJ31 SB7 USJ 7 KJ32 Taipan; Subang Perdana Goodyear Court 3, 4 & 5 Subang Business Center; USJ 9 Persiaran Tujuan; Jalan Mulia (USJ 14); Subang Perdana Goodyear Court 6, 7, 8, 9 & 10; Angsana Apartment; Masjid Al-Irsyad, USJ 1 SJK (C) Chee Wen
BET3	KJ14 KG16 Pasar Seni	USJ 1, Subang Mewah	Jalan Tun Tan Cheng Lock; Jalan Tun Sambanthan (KL Sentral); Jalan Bangsar; Pantai Baharu Expressway (Sunway Pyramid); Persiaran Kewajipan; Summit USJ; KJ31 SB7 USJ 7 KJ32 Taipan; Subang Perdana Goodyear Court 3, 4 & 5 USJ 8 Police Station; Persiaran Mulia; Persiaran Subang Indah; Angsana Apartment; Masjid Al-Irsyad, USJ 1 SJK (C) Chee Wen
SJ01	KJ31 SB7 USJ 7	KD09 KS02 KJ28 Subang Jaya	

== Gallery ==
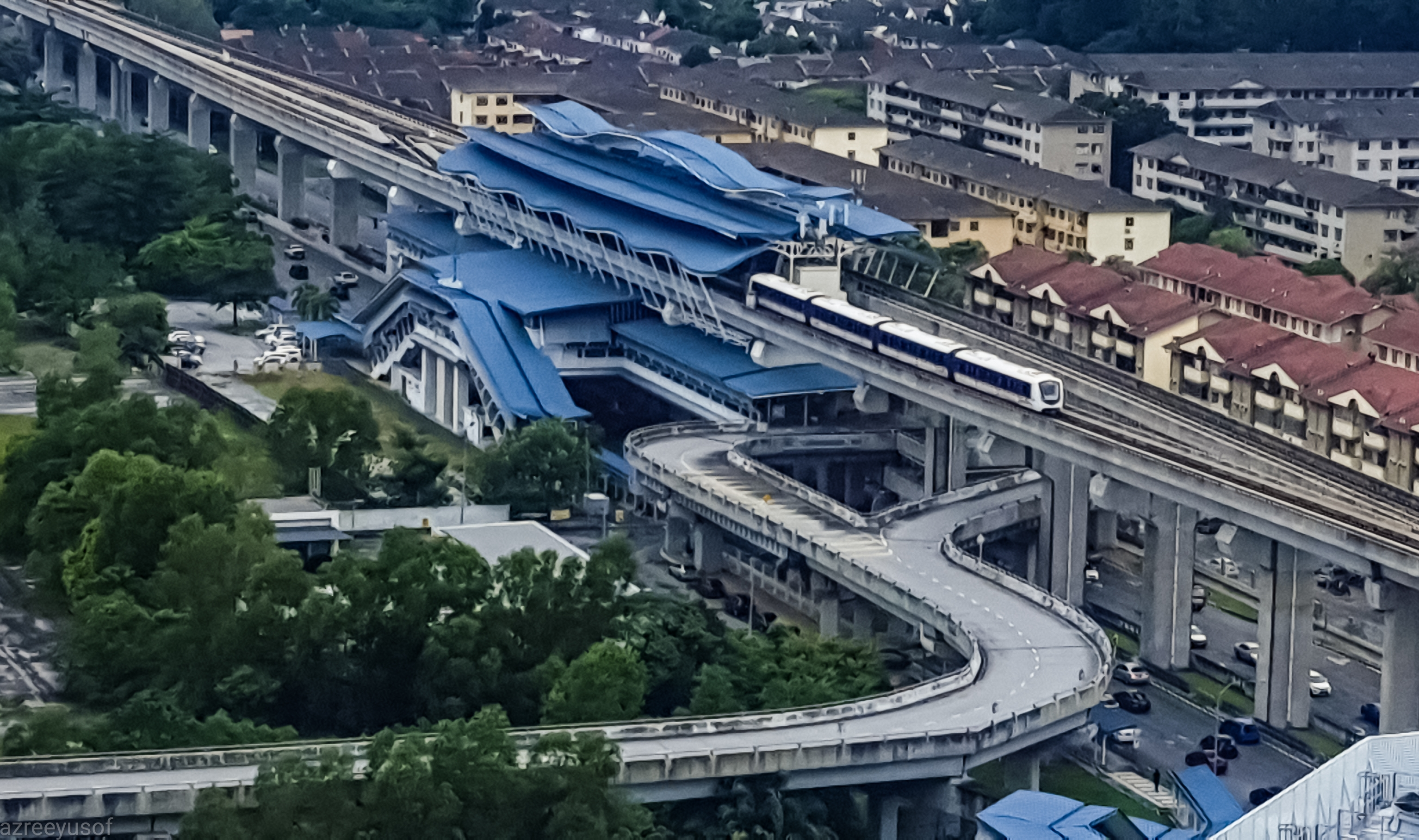
An aerial view of the USJ 7 station, with the BRT Sunway Line guideway making a loop with a stop beneath the station

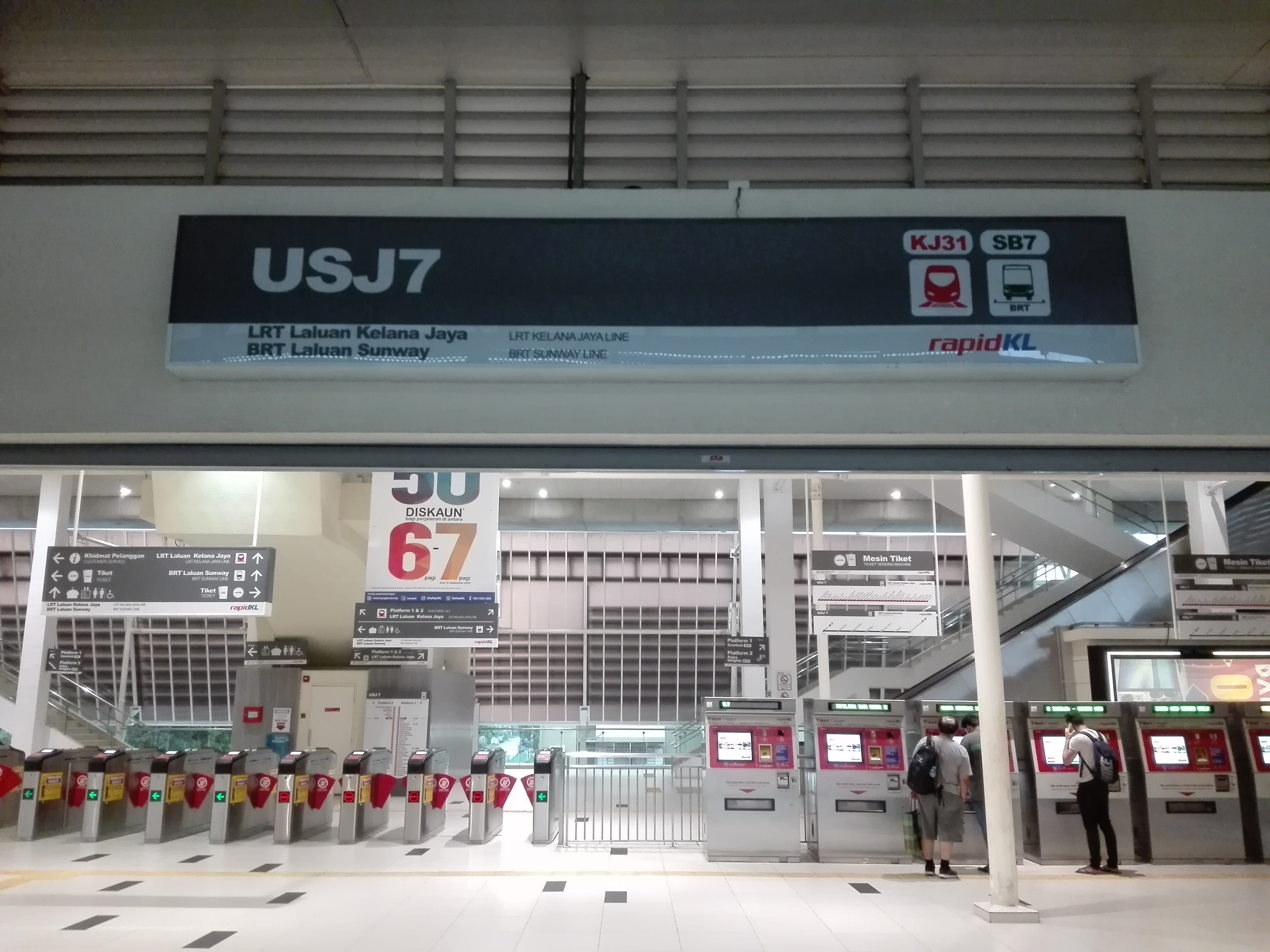
Concourse level entrance

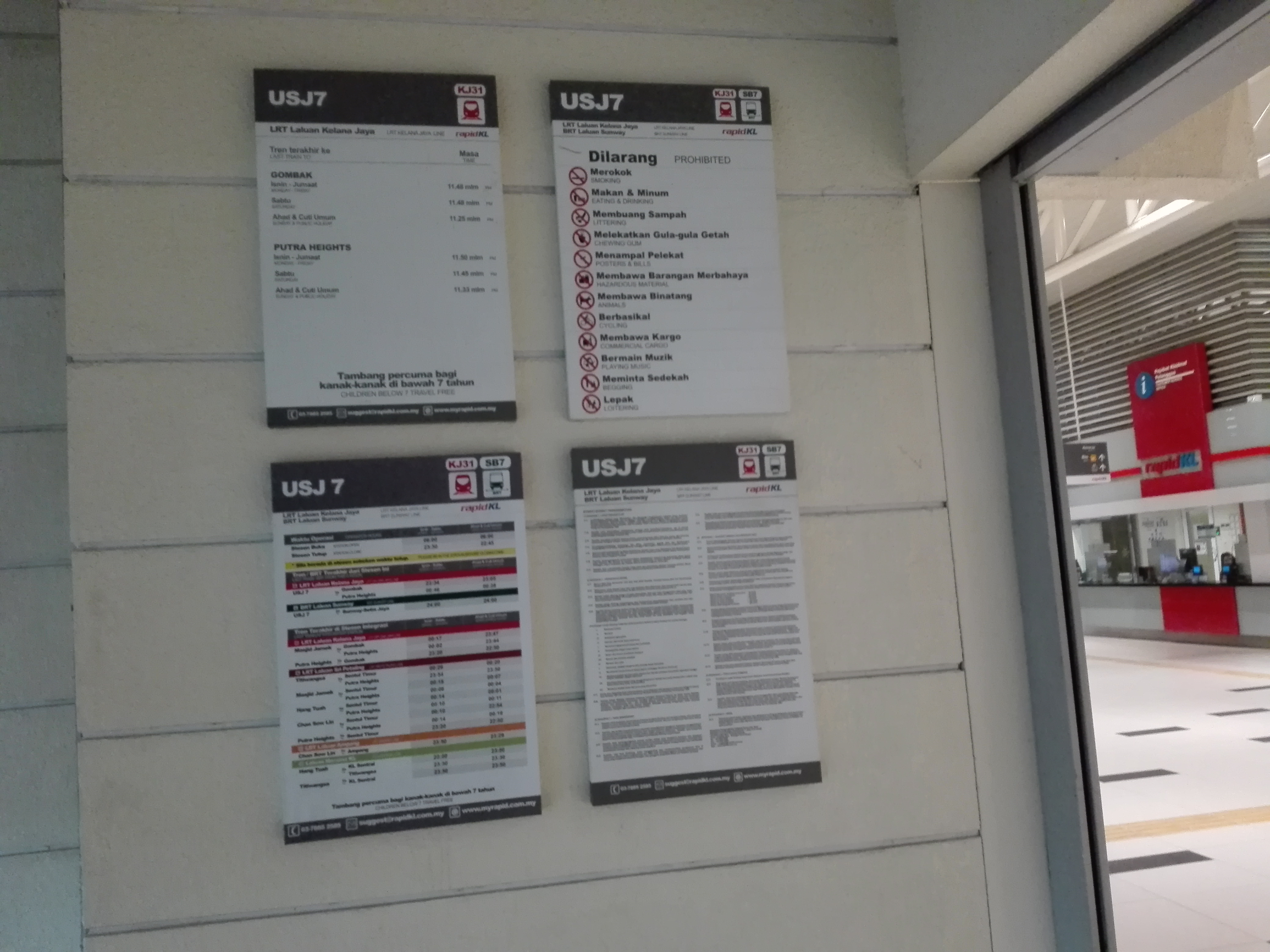
Information signage found at the concourse level

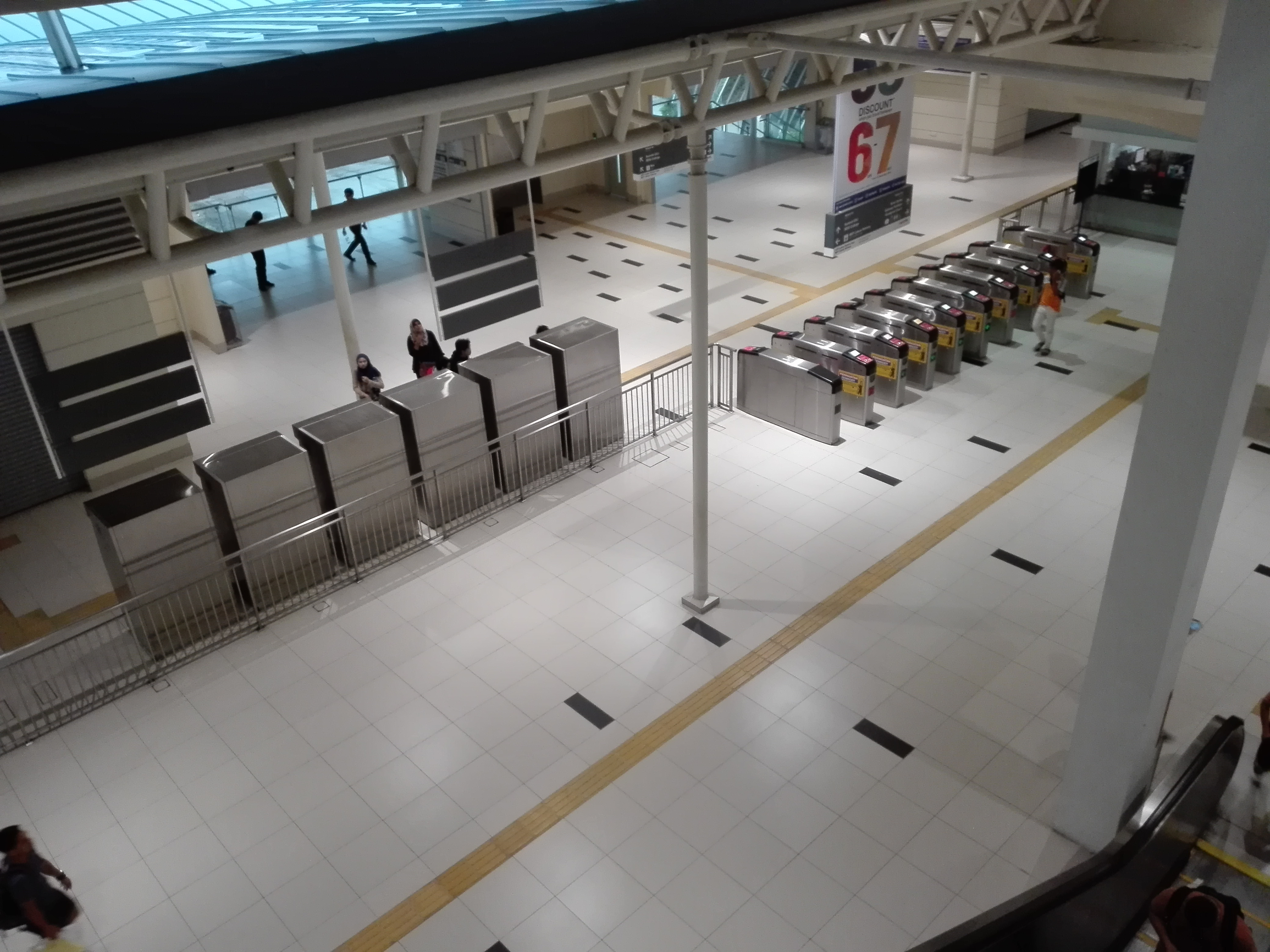
Faregates at the concourse level. The BRT and LRT are integrated with each other, therefore passengers do not need to exit the paid area to change lines.

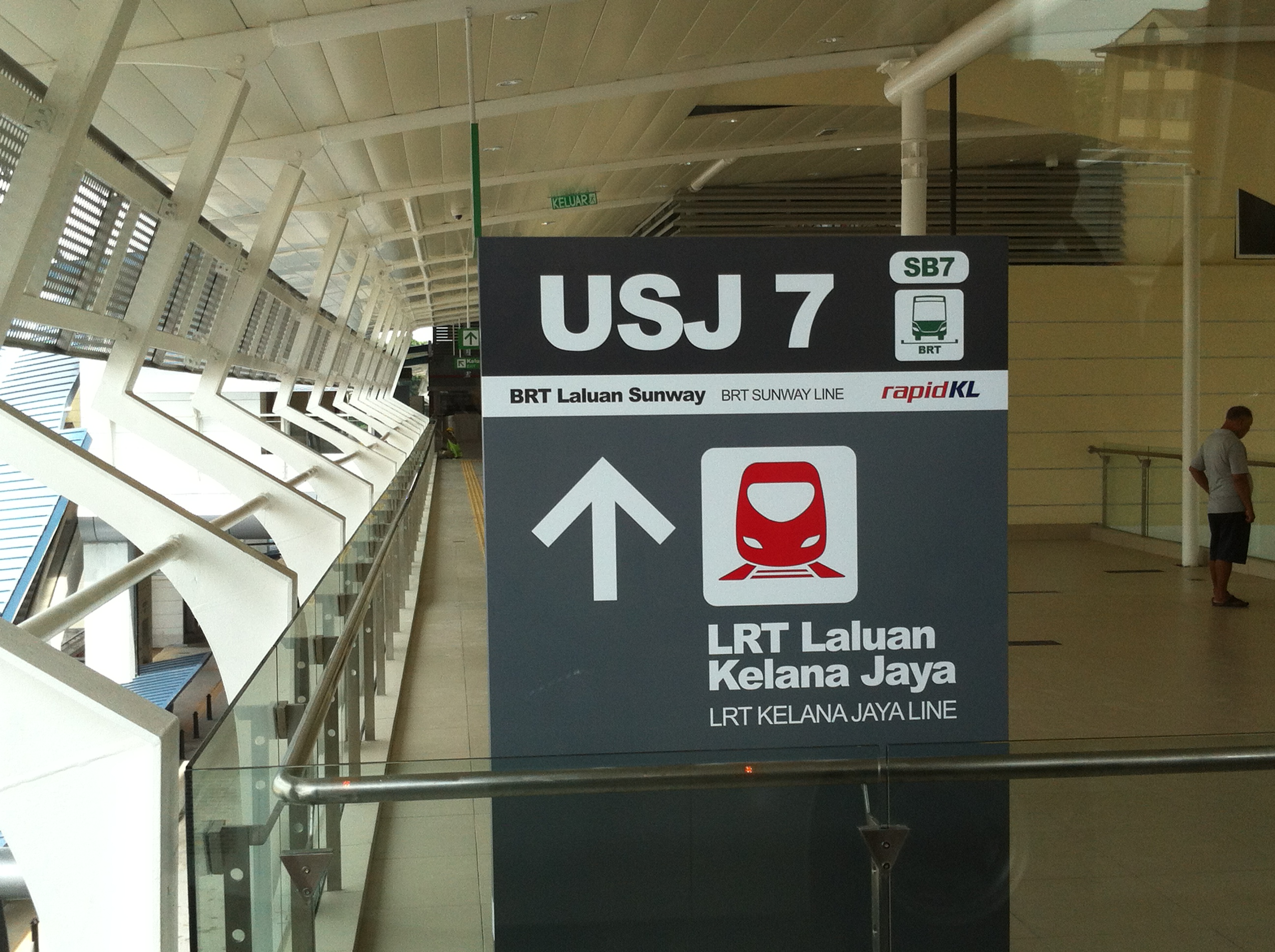
Signage from the BRT platform to the LRT platform

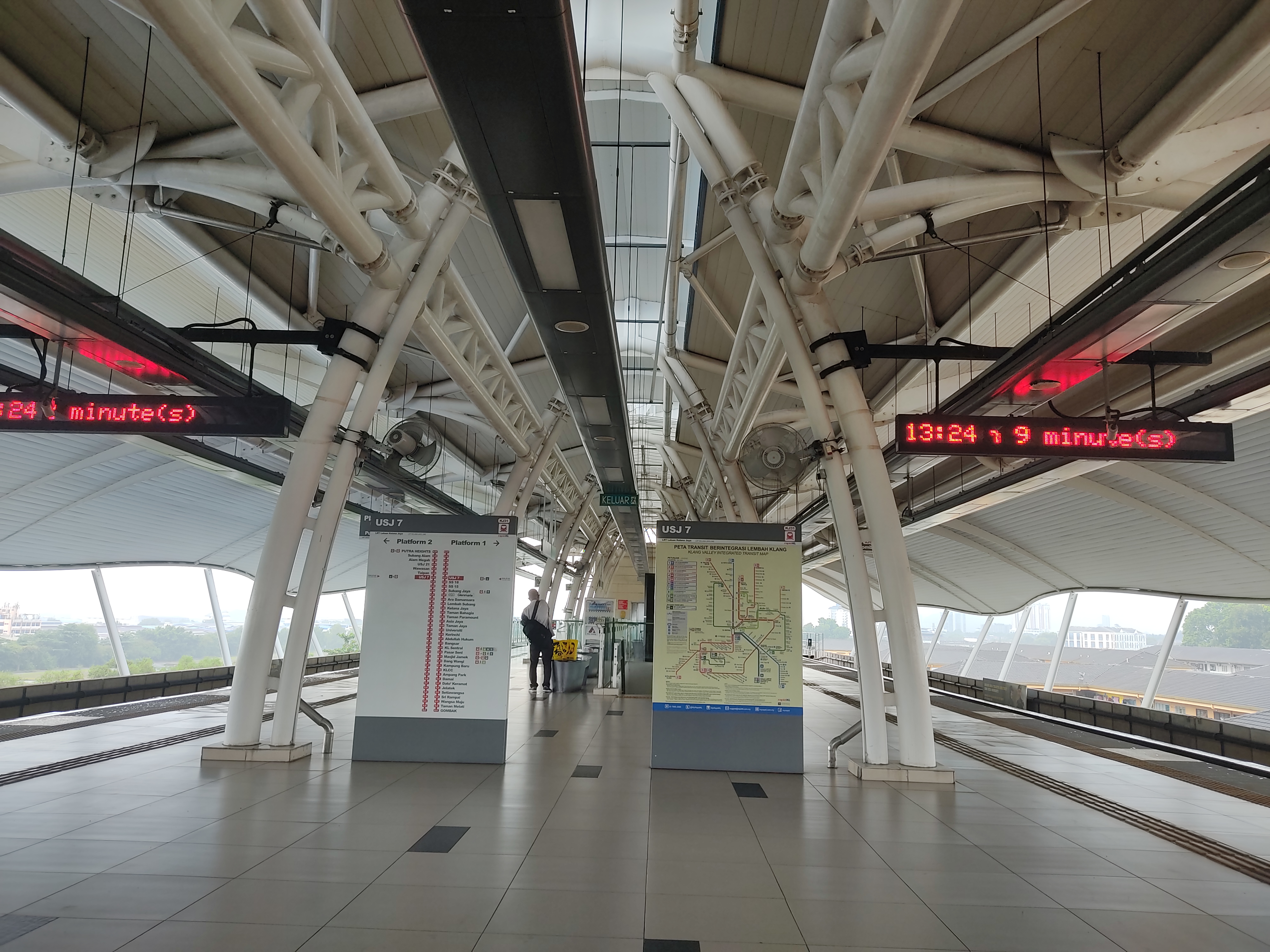
The LRT platform of the station

Covered passage leading to the BRT platform in September 2026

A Rapid KL Foton electric bus at the BRT platform in September 2026

== Around the station ==
- Da Men Mall
- The Summit USJ
- Segi College Subang
- SJ7 (Upcoming mixed development)
