= Jalan Kemajuan Subang =

Road in Malaysia

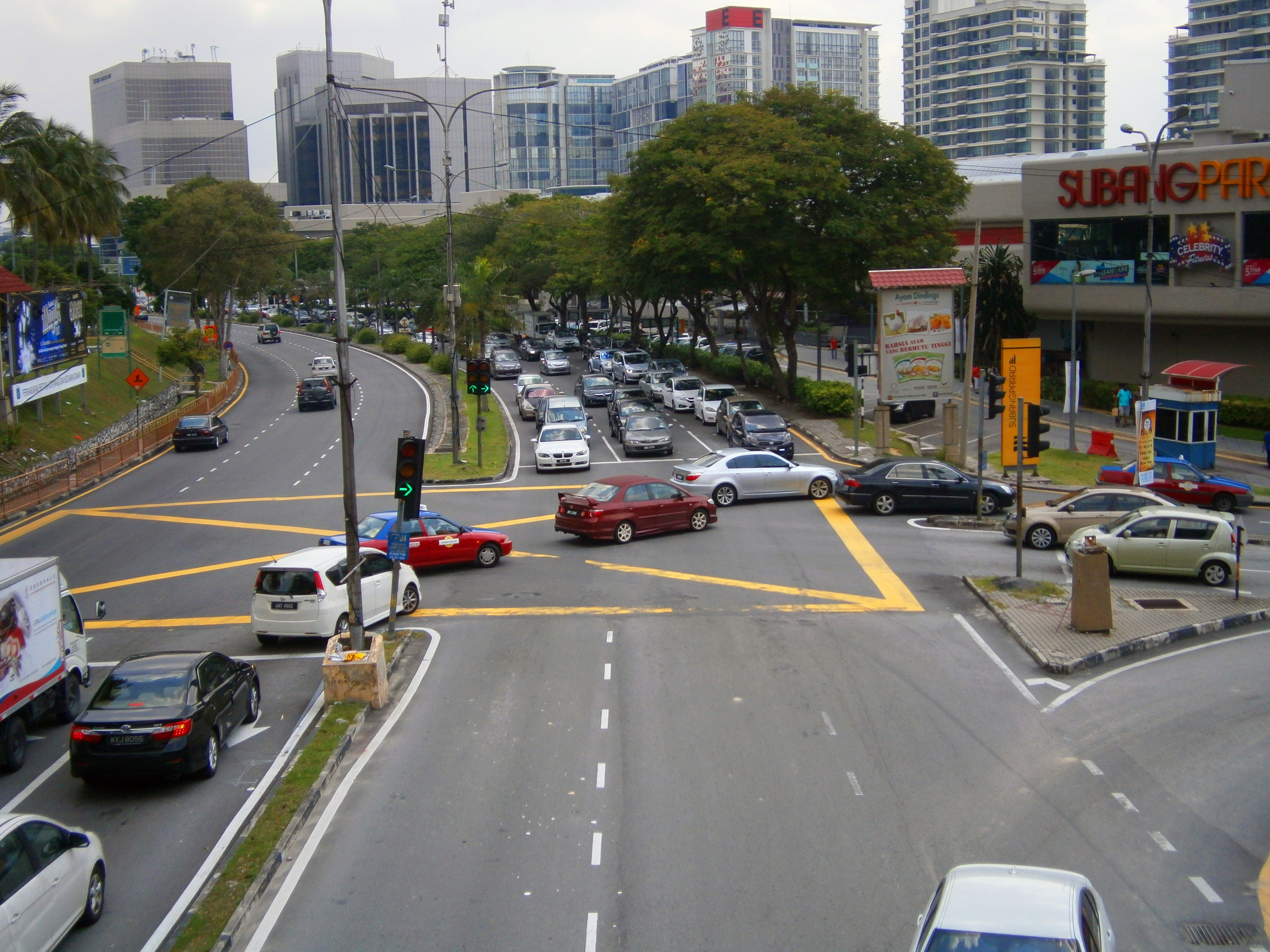

Major junctions
- West end: Subang Jaya hairpin corner
- Persiaran Tujuan; Jalan Jengka; Persiaran Kewajipan
- East end: Persiaran Kewajipan

Location
- Country: Malaysia
- Primary destinations: Subang Jaya; Glenmarie; Petaling Jaya

Highway system
- Highways in Malaysia; Expressways; Federal; State

Jalan Kemajuan Subang is an avenue in Subang Jaya, Selangor, Malaysia.

The Subang Jaya hairpin corner, located at SS19, is considered the biggest hairpin corner in Malaysia.

== List of junctions ==
Km	Exit	Junctions	To	Remarks
		Subang Jaya Hairpin Corner		Hairpin corner
		Jalan SS 19/1	South; Jalan SS 19/1; SS 19	
		Ramp off to Federal Highway (West bound)	West Only; FT 2 Federal Highway; Shah Alam; Klang	Ramp off
		Persiaran Tujuan	Persiaran Tujuan North; FT 3213 Glenmarie; FT 2 Federal Highway; Kuala Lumpur South; USJ	Interchange
		SS 17	South; Jalan SS 17/1; SS 17	
		Petaling District and Land Office		
		Wisma Consplant 2		
		Subang Jaya	Jalan Jengka North; Jalan SS 16/1; Empire Subang; Subang Parade Subang Jaya Komuter station 5 KTM Komuter South; SS 14 to 19; USJ; New Pantai Expressway New Pantai Expressway; Bandar Sunway; Bangsar; Petaling Jaya; Seremban	Junctions
		Subang Parade		
		Jalan SS 16/1	North; Jalan SS 16/1; Empire Subang; Subang Parade; Toyota Showroom; Subang Jaya Komuter station 5 KTM Komuter	T-junctions
		Aeon Big Subang Jaya		
		SS 15	South; Jalan SS 15/2; SS 15	T-junctions
		Ramp on to Subang-Kelana Jaya Link	Ramp On; FT 15 Subang-Kelana Jaya Link; Subang; Sultan Abdul Aziz Shah Airport; North–South Expressway Northern Route AH2 Ipoh; FT 2 Federal Highway; Kuala Lumpur; Petaling Jaya	Ramp on
		Menara Mesiniaga		
		Persiaran Kewajipan	Persiaran Kewajipan South Only; SS 12 to SS 13; USJ; Sime Darby Medical Centre Subang Jaya; New Pantai Expressway New Pantai Expressway; Bandar Sunway; Bangsar; Petaling Jaya; Seremban	T-junctions
