= Persiaran Kewajipan =

Road in Subang Jaya, Malaysia

- 格华芝班道

Route information
- Maintained by Subang Jaya City Council

Major junctions
- North end: Subang Jaya; Jalan Kemajuan Subang
- Jalan Kemajuan Subang; New Pantai Expressway; FT 15 Subang–Kelana Jaya Link; Shah Alam Expressway; Persiaran Murni; Persiaran Perpaduan; Persiaran Mulia; Persiaran Tujuan; Damansara–Puchong Expressway
- South end: Putra Heights; Damansara–Puchong Expressway

Location
- Country: Malaysia
- Primary destinations: Subang Jaya, UEP Subang Jaya (USJ), Putra Heights

Highway system
- Highways in Malaysia; Expressways; Federal; State

Persiaran Kewajipan (Chinese: 格华芝班道) is a major road in Subang Jaya, Selangor, Malaysia. The road connects from central Subang Jaya through USJ to Putra Heights near the city's south interchange at Damansara–Puchong Expressway E11 (LDP). It is the busiest road in Subang Jaya during rush hour from/to Kuala Lumpur. This driveway is maintained by the Subang Jaya City Council or Majlis Bandaraya Subang Jaya (MBSJ).

There is an elevated Kelana Jaya Line running through Persiaran Kewajipan which are USJ 7, Taipan, Wawasan and USJ 21.

== History ==
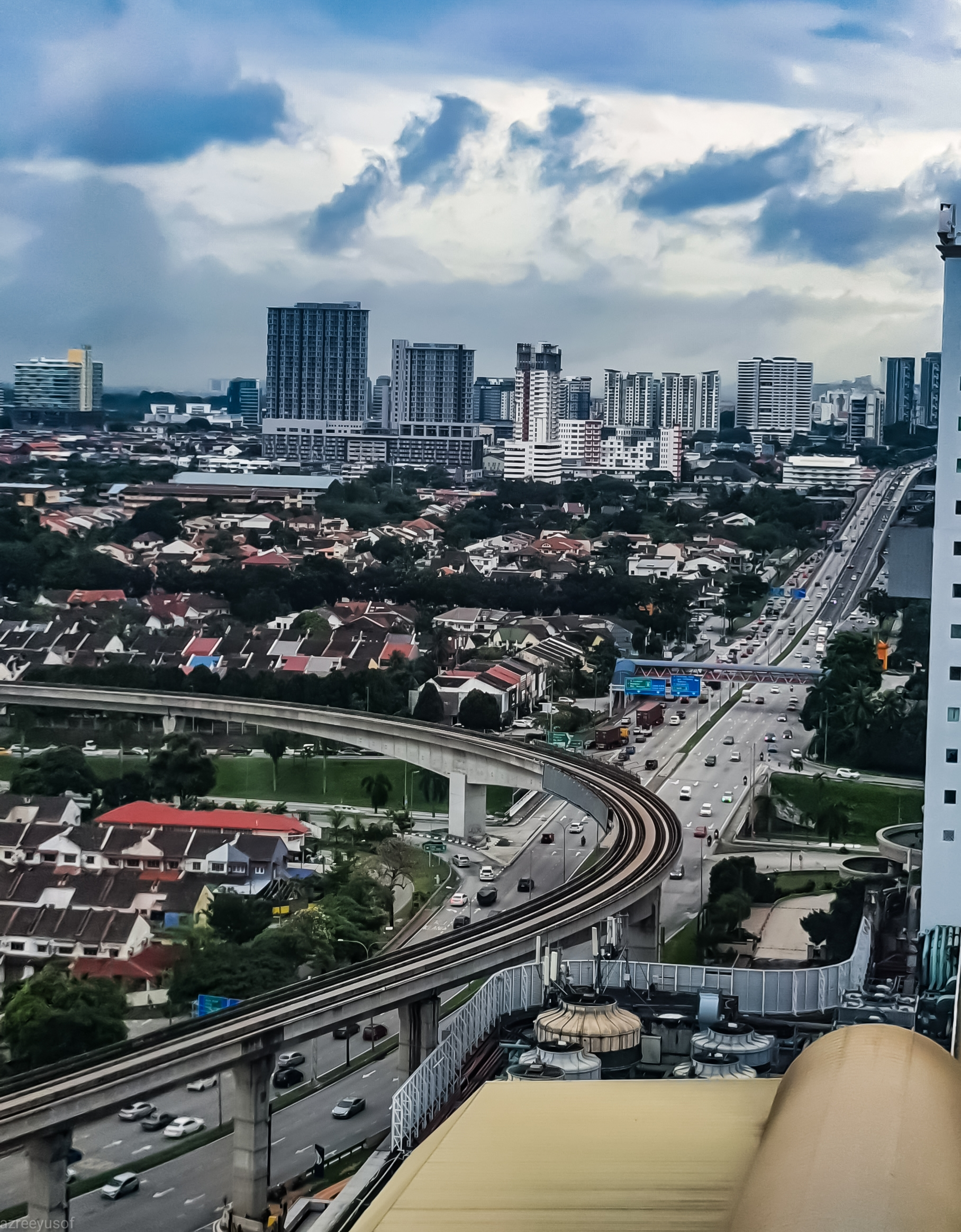
Persiaran Kewajipan intersection with Shah Alam Expressway (hidden below overpass).The expressway marks the border between Subang Jaya and USJ.

Sunway Property invests in excess of RM100 million for traffic improvement and upgrading works which have commenced at the Persiaran Kewajipan roundabout in Subang Jaya.

This project aims smoother traffic movement and connectivity across Bandar Sunway, Subang Jaya, and the USJ corridor.

== Interchange lists ==
The entire route is located in Petaling District, Selangor.

Legend:

- I/C - Interchange, I/S - Intersection, RSA - Rest and service area, OBR - Overhead bridge restaurant, R/R - Restaurant and rest plaza, L/B - Layby, V/P - Vista point, TN - tunnel, T/P - Toll plaza, BR - Bridge
- C - Cloverleaf, S - Stack, T-A - Trumpet-A, T-B - Trumpet-B, DT - Directional-T/Y, SDT - Semi-Directional-T/Y, P-Y - Partial-Y, D - Diamond, P-C - Partial cloverleaf, D-D - Diverging diamond, D-R - Direct ramp

Location	km	mi	Exit	Name	Destinations	Notes
Subang Jaya				Subang Jaya; Jalan Kemajuan Subang	Jalan Kemajuan Subang – Klang, Subang Parade	Directional-T junctions
Subang Jaya				SS 12	Jalan SS 12/-- – Subang Ria Park, Sime Darby Medical Centre Subang Jaya , Holiday Villa, Grand Dorsett	T-junctions
Subang Jaya				SS 15	University of Wollongong, Sri Kuala Lumpur	
Subang Jaya			1002	Bulatan Kewajipan	New Pantai Expressway – Persiaran Tujuan, Shah Alam, Klang, Glenmarie, Sunway City, Petaling Jaya, Bangsar, Kuala Lumpur	Multi-level stacked roundabout interchange
Subang Jaya				Kewajipan Flyover	FT 15 Subang–Kelana Jaya Link – Subang, Sultan Abdul Aziz Shah Airport; FT 2 Federal Highway – Kuala Lumpur, Petaling Jaya, Shah Alam, Klang	From/to southbound
Subang Jaya				SS 14	Residential Houses	Junctions
Subang Jaya				SS 13	Lamborghini Kuala Lumpur, Monash University	Junctions
Subang Jaya				Jalan Lagoon Utara	Jalan Lagoon Utara	
Subang Jaya			510	Kewajipan-SAE	Shah Alam Expressway – Klang, Shah Alam, Sri Petaling, Petaling Jaya, Kuala Lumpur, Seremban, Cheras, Kuantan	Diamond interchange
UEP Subang Jaya				USJ 1	The Summit	Northbound and Southbound
UEP Subang Jaya				Persiaran Murni	Persiaran Murni – USJ 2, USJ 5, USJ 6 Persiaran Subang Permai – USJ 1, Mydin Hypermarket, Giant Hypermarket, The Summit, South Quay-USJ 1 station B1	Junctions
UEP Subang Jaya				USJ 7 LRT station	USJ 7 LRT station 5 B1	Northbound and Southbound
UEP Subang Jaya				Jalan USJ 6/1	USJ 6	Northbound
UEP Subang Jaya				Taipan LRT station	Taipan LRT station 5	Northbound and Southbound
UEP Subang Jaya				Jalan Kewajipan	USJ 7, USJ 8	T-junctions
UEP Subang Jaya				Persiaran Perpaduan	Persiaran Perpaduan – USJ 5, USJ 6, USJ 10 Taipan, Subang Jaya City Council (MBSJ/SJCC) Headquarters	T-junctions
UEP Subang Jaya				USJ 9	Al-Falah Mosque, USJ 9	Northbound
UEP Subang Jaya				Persiaran Mulia	Persiaran Mulia – USJ 8, USJ 14, USJ 1	T-junctions
UEP Subang Jaya				Persiaran Tujuan	Persiaran Tujuan – USJ 13 to SS19	T-junctions
UEP Subang Jaya				Jalan Mulia	USJ 14	Southbound
UEP Subang Jaya				USJ 17-USJ 19	Wawasan LRT station 5 , The USJ 19 City Mall	
UEP Subang Jaya				USJ 20-USJ 25	One City USJ 25, Main Place Mall, USJ 21 LRT station 5	Junctions
UEP Subang Jaya				Subang Jaya South-LDP	Damansara–Puchong Expressway – Shah Alam (Persiaran Klang), Alam Megah/HICOM, Puchong, Sunway City, Putrajaya, Cyberjaya; North–South Expressway Central Link – Putra Heights, Bandar Saujana Putra, Ipoh, Kuala Lumpur International Airport (KLIA), Johor Bahru	Half-diamond interchange
1.000 mi = 1.609 km; 1.000 km = 0.621 mi: Incomplete access

== See also ==
- Persiaran Surian, similar road located in Kota Damansara, Petaling Jaya that has an evaluated MRT Kajang Line.
