= Mesiniaga Tower =

Building in Petaling, Selangor, Malaysia

Mesiniaga Tower Menara Mesiniaga
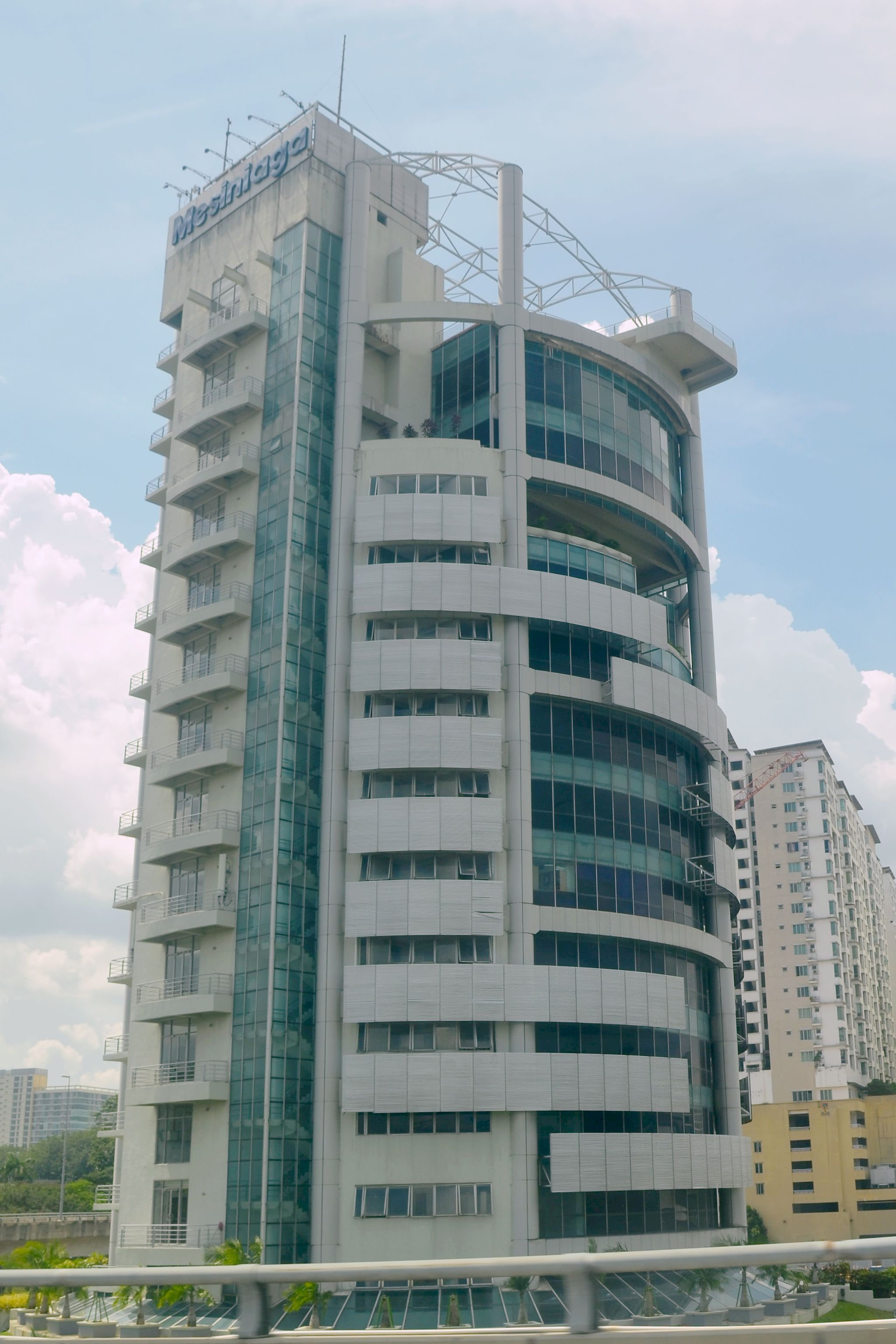
- Interactive map of the Mesiniaga Tower; Menara Mesiniaga area

General information
- Type: Office
- Architectural style: Structural expressionism
- Location: Subang Jaya, Selangor, Malaysia
- Coordinates: 3.08257°N 101.59251°E
- Construction started: 1989
- Completed: 1992

Height
- Architectural: 63 m (207 ft)

Technical details
- Floor count: 15

Design and construction
- Architect: Ken Yeang

Mesiniaga Tower or Menara Mesiniaga is a high-tech architectural building in SS16, Subang Jaya, Selangor, Malaysia. It is owned by Mesiniaga Berhad. The building is situated near Subang Parade and Empire Subang.

== History ==
The building's construction began in 1989 and was completed in 1992. In 1995, architect Ken Yeang, who designed the building, was awarded with the Aga Khan Award for Architecture.

It was built by Siah Brothers Construction Sdn Berhad, nowadays known as SBC Corporation Berhad.

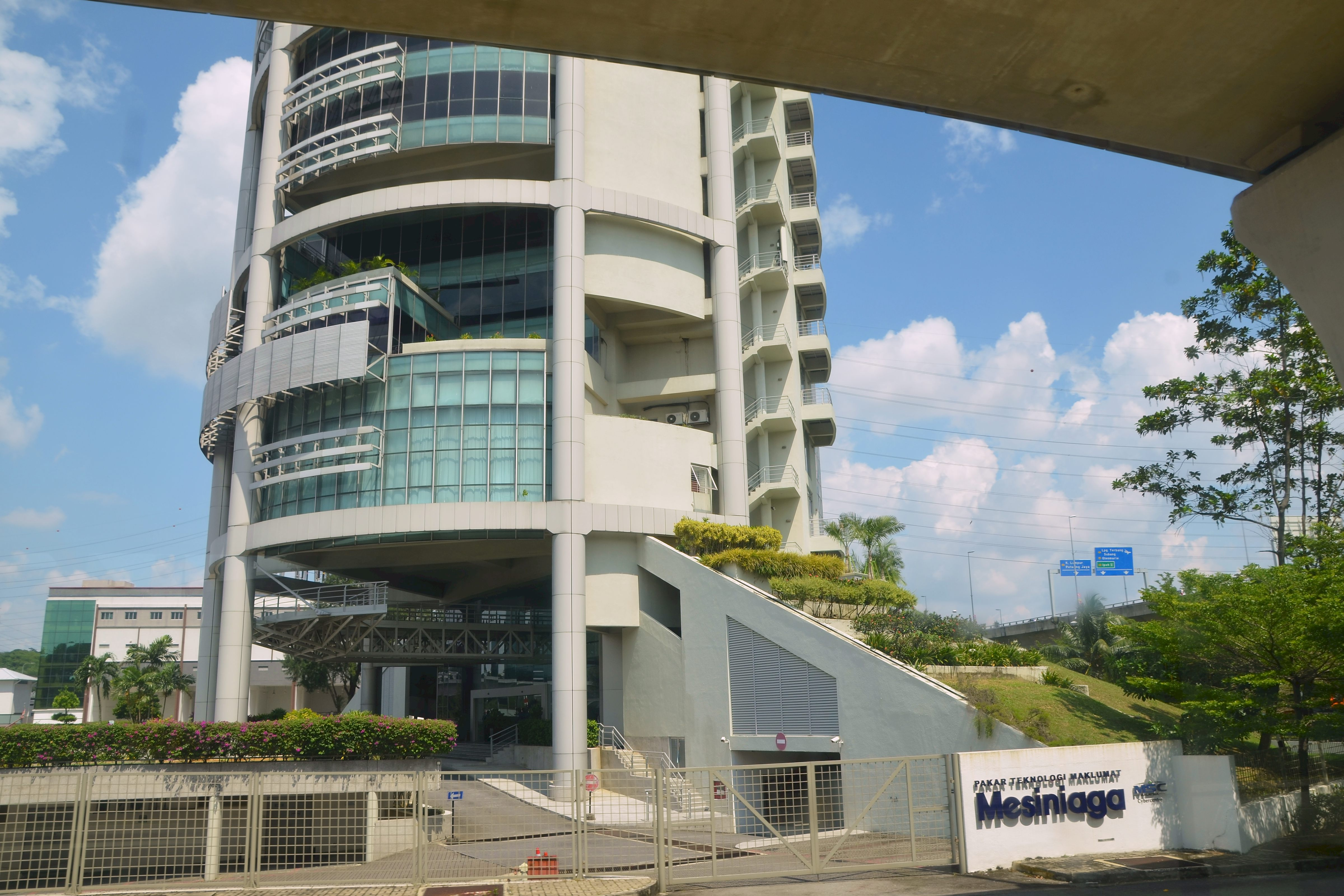
Base of the Mesiniaga Tower

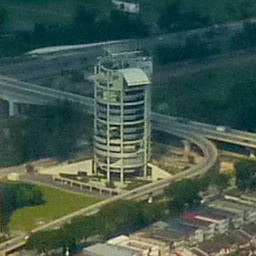
Aerial view of the tower

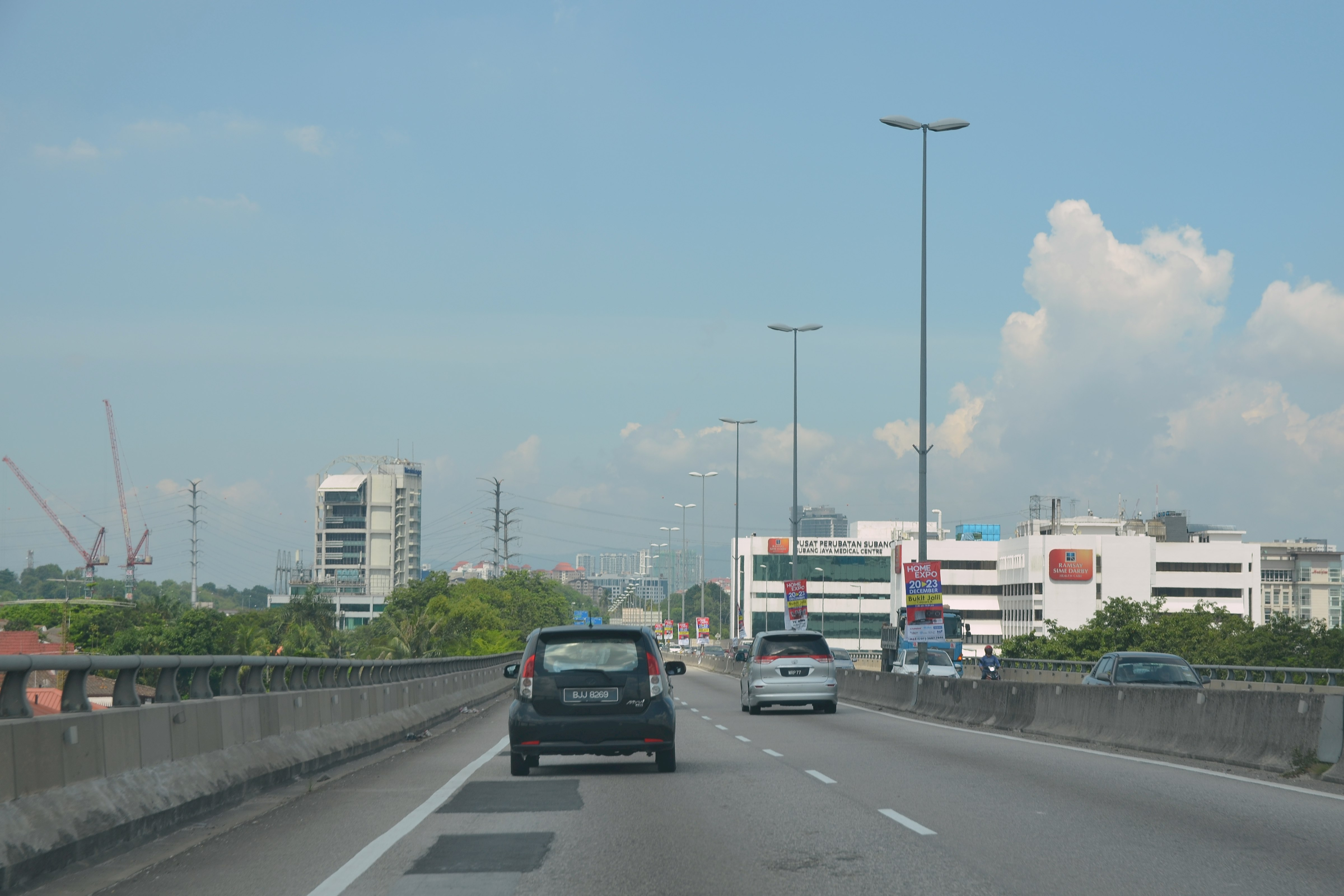
View of the tower (left) and Subang Medical Centre (right) from the Subang–Kelana Jaya Link
