= Persiaran Tujuan =

Road in Malaysia

Major junctions
- North end: Subang Jaya West Interchange; FT 2 Federal Highway
- FT 2 Federal Highway; Jalan Kemajuan Subang; New Pantai Expressway New Pantai Expressway; Persiaran Murni; Persiaran Perpaduan; Persiaran Setia; Persiaran Bakti; Persiaran Kewajipan
- South end: Persiaran Kewajipan Interchange; Persiaran Kewajipan

Location
- Country: Malaysia
- Primary destinations: Glenmarie; Subang Jaya; USJ

Highway system
- Highways in Malaysia; Expressways; Federal; State

Persiaran Tujuan is a main road in Subang Jaya, Selangor, Malaysia. The road connects Subang Jaya west interchange at Federal Highway (Federal Route 2) to Persiaran Kewajipan. It is one of the busiest roads in UEP Subang Jaya during rush hour from/to Kuala Lumpur. It is an alternative route to Persiaran Kewajipan for motorists to avoid traffic congestion.

During workdays or peak hours, there are restricted routes along Persiaran Tujuan. Heavy vehicles (except buses and tankers) with laden and unladen heavy vehicles weighing 10,000 kg or more are not allowed to enter these routes between 6:30 am until 9:30 am on Monday to Friday (except public holidays). A compound fine will be issued to heavy vehicles that flout the rule.

== List of junctions ==
Km	Exit	Junctions	To	Remarks
		Subang Jaya West	North; Jalan Pengaturcaraan U2/-- Glenmarie; Subang Airport; Ipoh FT 2 Federal Highway West; Shah Alam; Klang East; Kuala Lumpur; Petaling Jaya	Trumpet interchange
		Jalan Kemajuan Subang	Jalan Kemajuan Subang West; FT 2 Shah Alam; FT 2 Klang East; Subang Jaya city centre Subang Parade; SS15 to SS17; Subang Jaya Medical Centre	Interchange
		Persiaran Tujuan-NPE	East; New Pantai Expressway New Pantai Expressway; Bandar Sunway; Petaling Jaya; Bangsar; Kuala Lumpur; Kuchai Lama; Seremban	Directional T interchange
		SS 19	SS 19	T-junctions
		Bridge		
		Persiaran Murni	East; Persiaran Murni; USJ 1, USJ 2, USJ 5, USJ 6 Shah Alam Expressway Shah Alam Expressway; Klang; Shah Alam; Sri Petaling; Kuala Lumpur	T-junctions
		Persiaran Perpaduan	East; Persiaran Perpaduan; USJ 6 USJ 11; USJ 10 Taipan; Majlis Bandaraya Subang Jaya (MBSJ) Headquarters	T-junctions
		Persiaran Setia	West; Persiaran Setia; USJ 12; USJ 3, USJ 4 USJ 3A, USJ 3B, USJ 3C, USJ 3D; UEP Industrial Park; USJ Heights; Subang Heights; Subang Hi-Tech Industrial Estate; Shah Alam	T-junctions
		Jalan Usaha	South; Jalan Usaha; Puchong; Shah Alam; USJ 16; USJ 17	West bound Light vehicles only Maximum height limit 2.1 m
		Persiaran Bakti	North; Persiaran Bakti; USJ 11; USJ 9 USJ 10 Taipan; Majlis Perbandaran Subang Jaya (MPSJ) Headquarters	T-junctions
		Persiaran Kewajipan	Persiaran Kewajipan North; USJ 1 to USJ 10 Taipan; Subang Jaya city centre Shah Alam Expressway Shah Alam Expressway; Klang; Shah Alam; Sri Petaling; Kuala Lumpur South; USJ; Damansara–Puchong Expressway Damansara–Puchong Expressway; Puchong; Putrajaya; Cyberjaya; Kuala Lumpur International Airport (KLIA); Ipoh; Johor Bahru; Hicom	T-junctions
