= Subang Jaya =

City in Selangor, Malaysia

Subang Jaya, Selangor
- City
- City of Subang Jaya Bandaraya Subang Jaya (Malay)
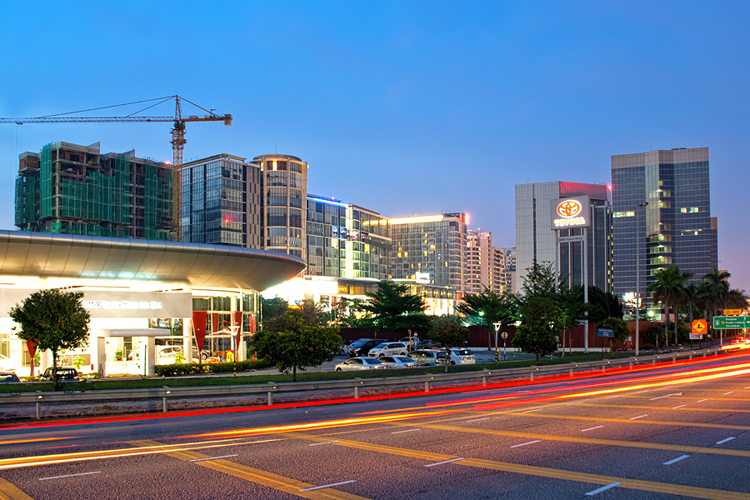
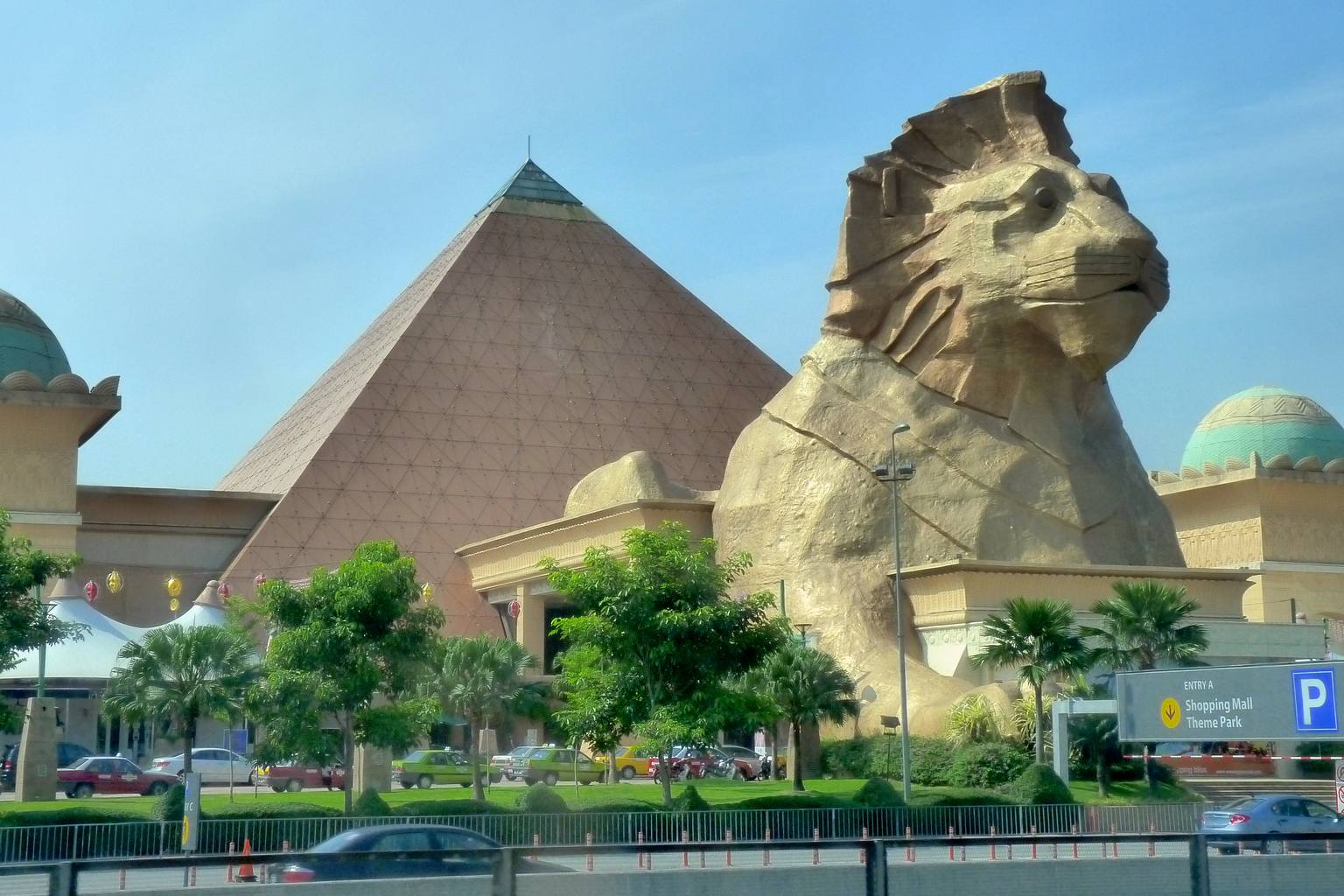
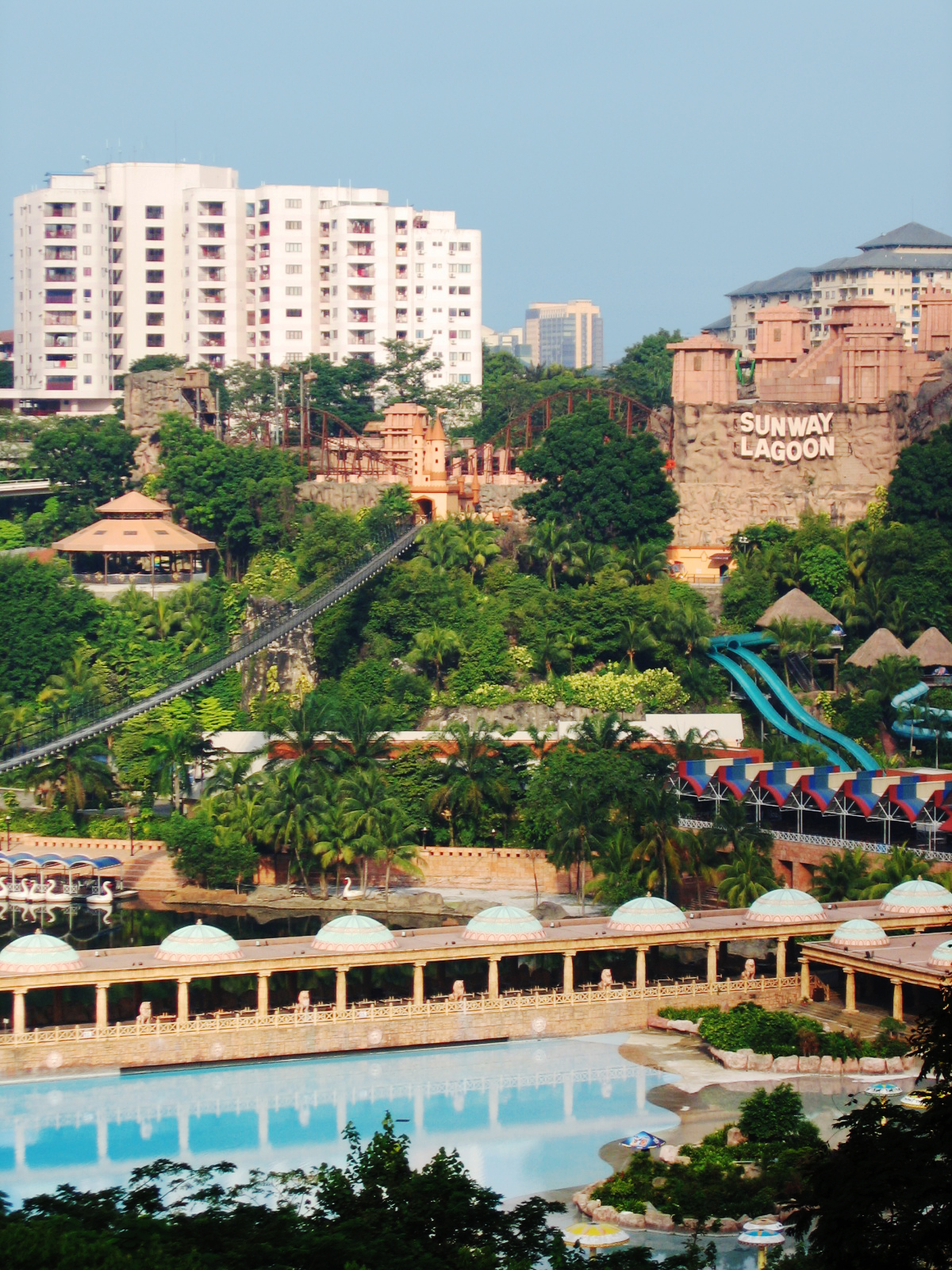
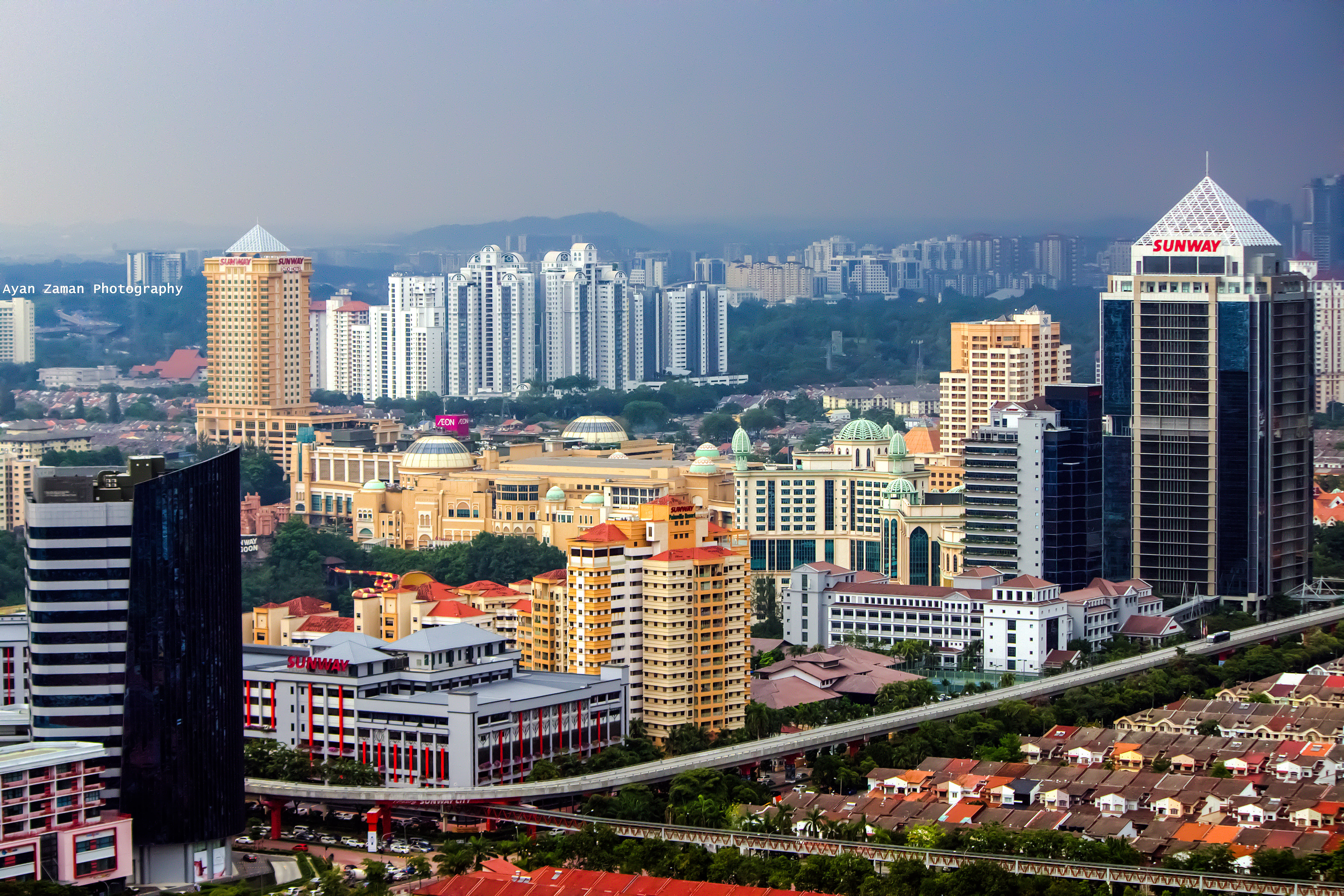
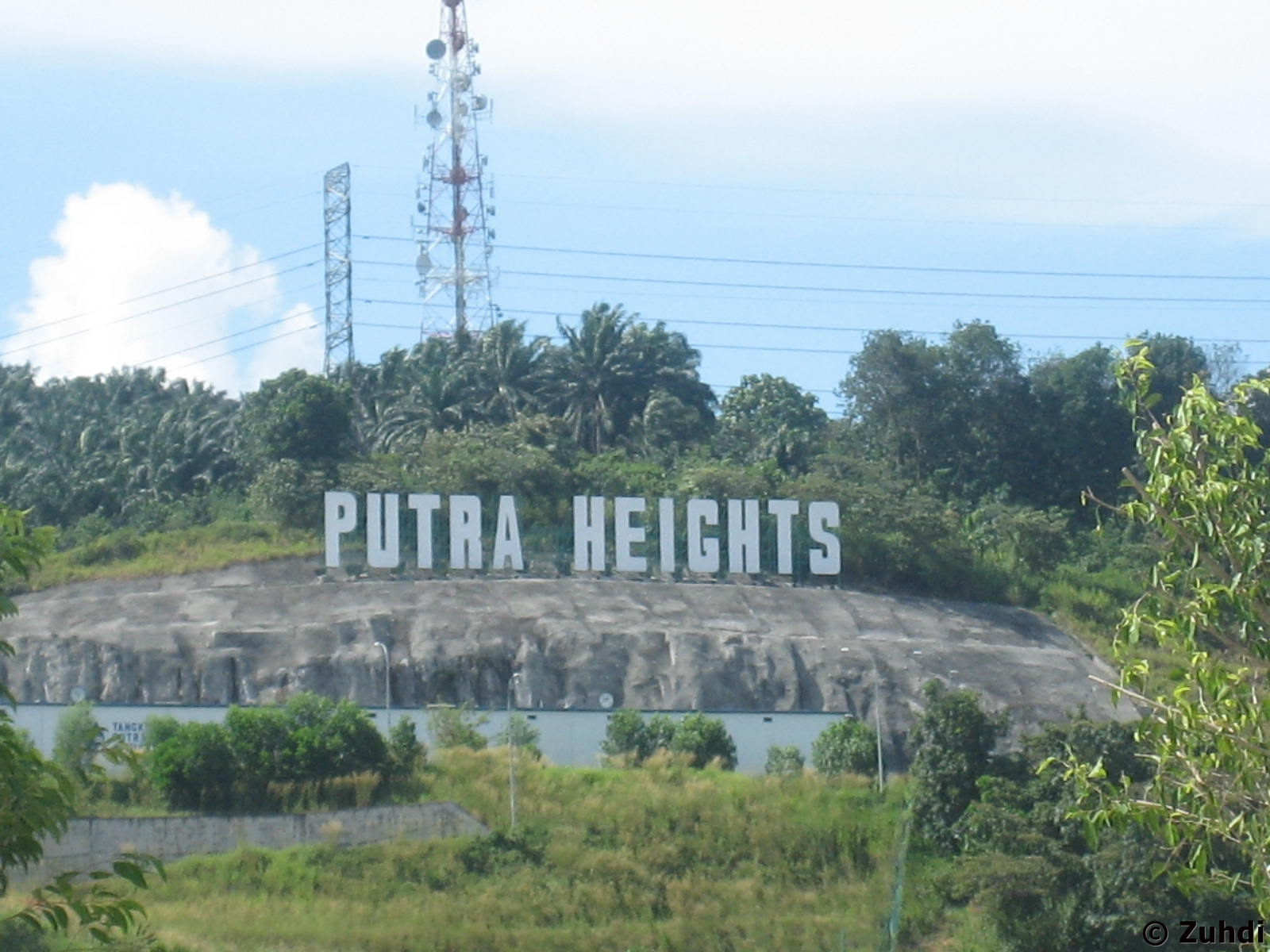
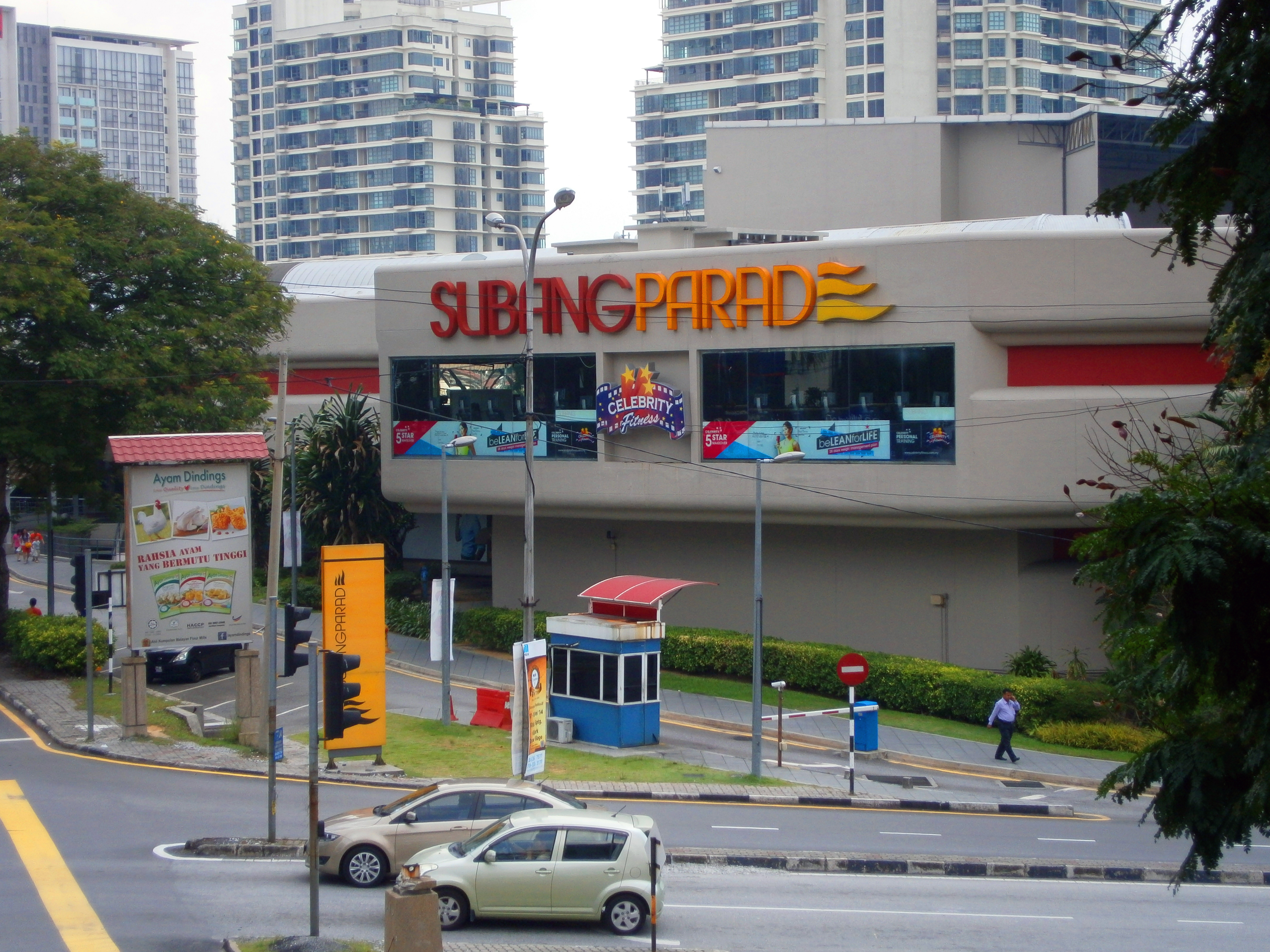
- From top, left to right: Subang Jaya City Centre (SJCC) at SS16, Sunway Pyramid, Sunway Lagoon, Bandar Sunway skyline, Putra Heights, and Subang Parade

- Seal
- Motto: Gemilang Bersama (in Malay) "Glorious Together"
- Interactive map of Subang Jaya, Selangor
- Subang Jaya in Selangor Subang Jaya, Selangor (Malaysia) Subang Jaya, Selangor (Southeast Asia) Subang Jaya, Selangor (Asia)
- Coordinates: 3°3′52″N 101°35′37″E
- Country: Malaysia
- State: Selangor
- District: Petaling
- Establishment: 21 February 1976
- Establishment of the district council: 1 January 1977
- Municipality status: 1 January 1997
- City status: 20 October 2020

Government
  - Type: City council
  - Body: Subang Jaya City Council
  - Mayor: Mohd Fauzi bin Mohd Yatim

Area
  - Total: 70.41 km^{2} (27.19 sq mi)

Population
  - Total: 771,687
  - Density: 10,960/km^{2} (28,390/sq mi)
- Time zone: UTC+8 (MST)
- Postcode: 47500, 47600, 47610, 47620, 47630
- Area codes: +603-56, +603-80
- Website: portal.mbsj.gov.my

Subang Jaya is a city in Petaling District, Selangor, Malaysia. It comprises the southern third district of Petaling. It consists of the neighbourhoods from SS12 to SS19, UEP Subang Jaya (USJ), Putra Heights, Batu Tiga as well as PJS7, PJS9 and PJS11 of Bandar Sunway, the latter of which are partially jurisdictional within Petaling Jaya under the MBPJ. The city is governed by Subang Jaya City Council (MBSJ), which also governs other areas of the Petaling district, such as Puchong and Seri Kembangan. According to Subang Jaya City Council, Subang Jaya has a population of 968,930 in 2020, which makes it the sixth largest city in Malaysia by population.

== History ==
The site was formerly a rubber plantation called Seafield Estate. Originally part of Klang District, it would later be handed over by the municipality of Petaling Jaya.

Developed by Sime UEP Properties Berhad, the property development arm of the Malaysian conglomerate Sime Darby, construction of Subang Jaya began on 21 February 1976 with 342 units of terrace and shophouses. Sime UEP completed all residential developments in the township in June 1988 and commercial development continued after that. Meanwhile, Sime UEP began clearing land for the development of USJ. In 1999, Sime UEP began the development of Putra Heights which is located on the southern end of Subang Jaya.

The population of Subang Jaya in 1988 was estimated to be around 55,000 to 70,000.

In 1997, Subang Jaya received the status of a municipality, elevating the Petaling District Council to Subang Jaya Municipal Council. The municipal comprise the areas administered by the former Petaling District Council, as well as some areas transferred from Petaling Jaya, Puchong and Shah Alam. This means that the MPSJ municipality holds local government authority not only in the Subang Jaya city centre, but also USJ, Putra Heights, Batu Tiga, Bandar Sunway, Puchong, Bandar Kinrara, Seri Kembangan, and Balakong. In parliamentary terms, Subang Jaya's municipal area covers the parliamentary constituency of Puchong and Subang in its entirety, as well as parts of Kota Raja which mainly cover Putra Heights. On the west side of Subang Jaya, Batu Tiga covers areas like Subang Hi-Tech Industrial Park, Taman Mutiara Subang, Taman Subang Mas and Tropicana Metropark. Subang Jaya city itself lies within the Subang constituency, while Seri Kembangan and Puchong fall within the Puchong constituency. In December 2019, it was officially announced that Subang Jaya's municipality will be upgraded to a city council after a long 5-year wait since MPSJ's application in 2014.

== Governance ==
Since 2013, the Dewan Rakyat parliamentary constituency of Subang (P104, formerly as Kelana Jaya) is represented by Wong Chen of the Pakatan Harapan-People's Justice Party (PKR) while the Selangor State Assembly seat of Subang Jaya is represented by Michelle Ng Mei Sze from the Pakatan Harapan-Democratic Action Party (DAP).

Chinese form majority constituting over half of the population. Malays are a substantial minority at around a third of the population and Indians are significant at around a sixth of the population. The data includes Puchong and Seri Kembangan which forms a major part of Subang Jaya city.

Ethnic breakdown of Subang Jaya's electorate as of 2022
1. Chinese (52.1%)
2. Malay (30.7%)
3. Indian (14.5%)
4. Other ethnicities (2.70%)

== Demographics ==
As of 2020, Subang Jaya was populated by 902,086 residents, making it Malaysia's fourth most populous city. Subang Jaya which is its core city consists of major towns like Puchong, Seri Kembangan and Seri Serdang. Majority is Chinese followed by Malays, Indians and others.

| Chinese | 41.06% |
| Malay | 37.15% |
| Other Bumiputeras | 1.13% |
| Indians | 10.24% |
| Others | 0.81% |
| Non-Malaysians | 9.61% |

== Commerce ==
Subang Parade, Empire Subang, Sunway Pyramid, Aeon Big Subang and SS15 Courtyard are the main shopping attractions around the areas of the Subang Jaya city centre. In the adjacent township of Bandar Sunway, there is Sunway Lagoon, an amusement water theme park which is a tourist landmark across the nation. The commercial district of SS15 serves as Subang Jaya's central entertainment and business area. Within the area, there is also an abundance of international F&B outlets, cafes, dining restaurants, boutique outlets and banks. There are plenty of high-rise office buildings and serviced residences surrounding the area as well.

In USJ, there are shopping malls such as Da Men, Main Place, One City, The Summit, The 19 USJ City Mall, Giant USJ and Mydin USJ to provide more shopping options. The main commercial hub of the USJ township is USJ Taipan which is a bustling business area. There are many small-scale commercial areas scattering around the neighbourhoods of USJ to provide amenities and conveniences as well.

== Recreation ==
The largest recreation park in Subang Jaya is the Subang Ria Park, situated nearby the Sime Darby Medical Centre in SS12. During its heyday in the 1990s, the park was a boating place with tennis court, paintball and go-karting arenas. As of 2015, it was a park mainly used for jogging activities, with a deterioration in the condition of other resources in the park after a number of years of neglect. Recently in 2023, Subang Ria Park has been upgraded with better facilities. For an urban park experience, there is Tropicana Metropark which contains a 9.2 acres (3.7 ha) central park with features like a human-made lake with a bio-filtration system to prevent mosquito breeding, a pedestrian promenade and a food-and-beverage strip for alfresco indulgence.

== Economy ==
The Malaysia headquarters of Proton Holdings, the Centre of Excellence; Lotus Cars, Faber-Castell and other major international companies are located in Sime UEP Industrial Park.

Nu Empire Shopping Gallery in Subang Jaya

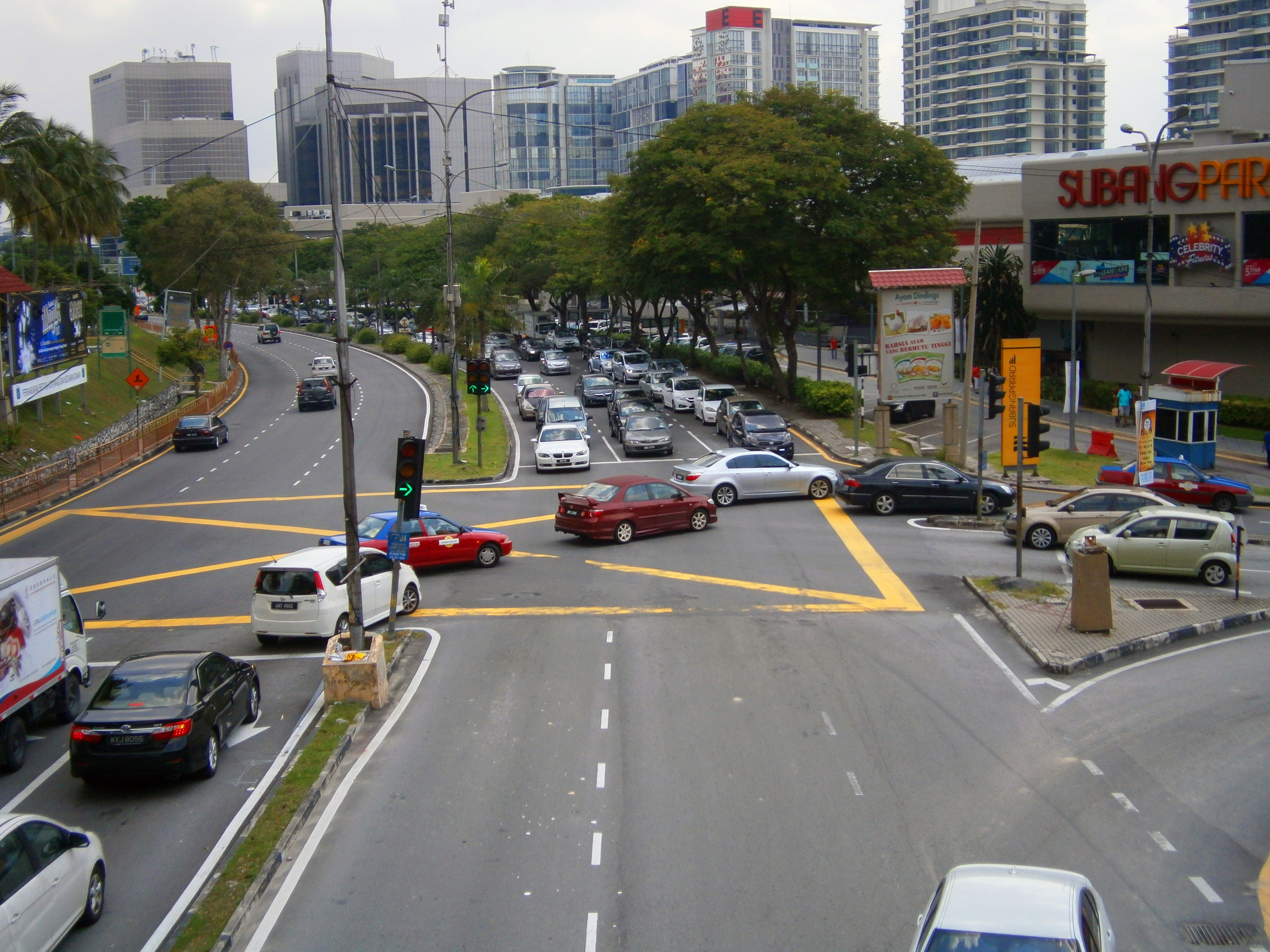
Jalan Kemajuan Subang facing Northwest at the three-way intersection near Subang Parade

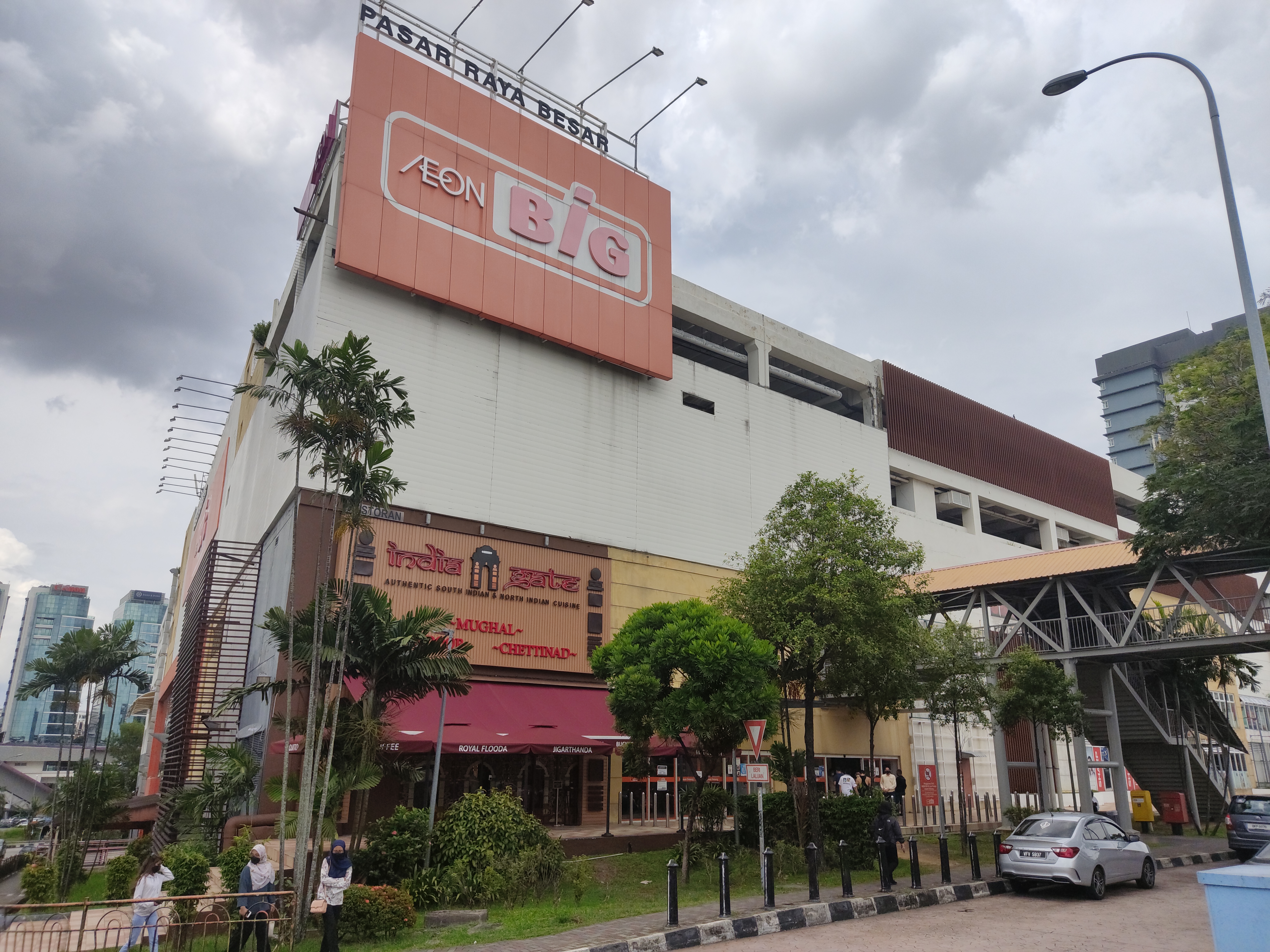
AEON BiG Subang Jaya in 2022

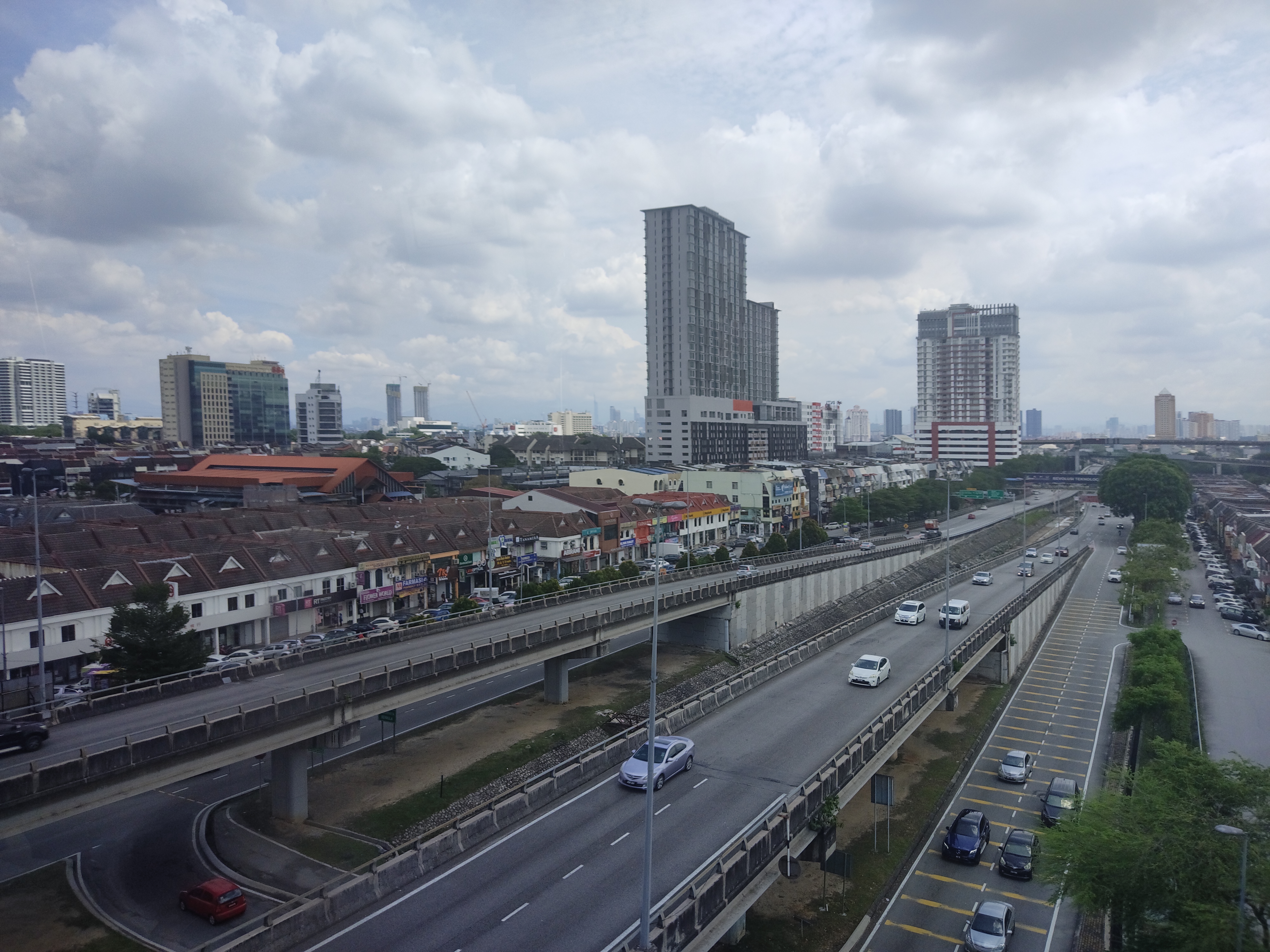
SS15 commercial area

== Education ==
Subang Jaya is the site of many large international private colleges and universities. It also consists of over 30 primary and secondary schools including local, private and international.

=== Primary schools ===
- At-tamimi International Islamic School
- Fairview International School
- GEMS International School
- Kingsley International School
- Sekolah Kebangsaan Sri Subang Jaya (SS14)
- Sekolah Kebangsaan Seri Selangor (USJ4)
- Sekolah Kebangsaan Subang Jaya (SS14)
- Sekolah Wawasan (USJ 15)
- Sekolah Kebangsaan Bandar Sunway
- Sekolah Kebangsaan Dato Onn Jaafar
- Sekolah Cina Tun Tan Cheng Lock
- Sekolah Tamil Tun Sambathan
- Sekolah Kebangsaan Seafield 3
- Sekolah Kebangsaan USJ 12
- Sekolah Kebangsaan Perdana Jaya SS19
- Sekolah Kebangsaan SS19
- Sekolah Tamil Seafield
- Sekolah Kebangsaan Seafield (USJ 6)
- Sekolah Kebangsaan USJ 2
- Sekolah Cina Chee Wen (USJ 1)
- Sekolah Cina Lick Hung (SS19)
- Sekolah Kebangsaan USJ 20
- Sekolah Rendah Islam Integrasi Masjid Darul Ehsan (SS15)
- UCSI International School
- Sri UCSI (Primary)
- Sri Kuala Lumpur Primary School
- Sunway International School

=== Secondary schools ===
- At-tamimi International Islamic School
- Eagles Grammar International School
- Fairview International School
- GEMS International School
- Kingsley International School
- Japanese School of Kuala Lumpur (JSKL)
- Sekolah Menengah Kebangsaan SS17
- Sekolah Menengah Kebangsaan USJ 4
- Sekolah Menengah Kebangsaan Seafield
- Sekolah Menengah Kebangsaan USJ 8
- Sekolah Menengah Kebangsaan USJ 12
- Sekolah Menengah Kebangsaan USJ 13
- Sekolah Menengah Kebangsaan USJ 23
- Sekolah Menengah Kebangsaan USJ 4
- Sekolah Agama Menengah Bestari USJ 5
- Sekolah Menengah Kebangsaan Subang Jaya SS14
- Sekolah Menengah Kebangsaan Subang Utama SS18
- Sirius Scholar Education Center
- Sri Kuala Lumpur Secondary School
- UCSI International School
- Sri UCSI Secondary School
- Sunway International School

=== Higher education ===
- ALFA International College
- At-tamimi International A Level School
- Cilantro Culinary Academy
- International Medical College
- INTI International University
- Monash University
- SEGi University College
- Sunway TES
- Sunway College
- Sunway University
- Taylor's College
- Taylor's University
- The One Academy
- Westminster International College
- International College IMPERiA

== Healthcare ==
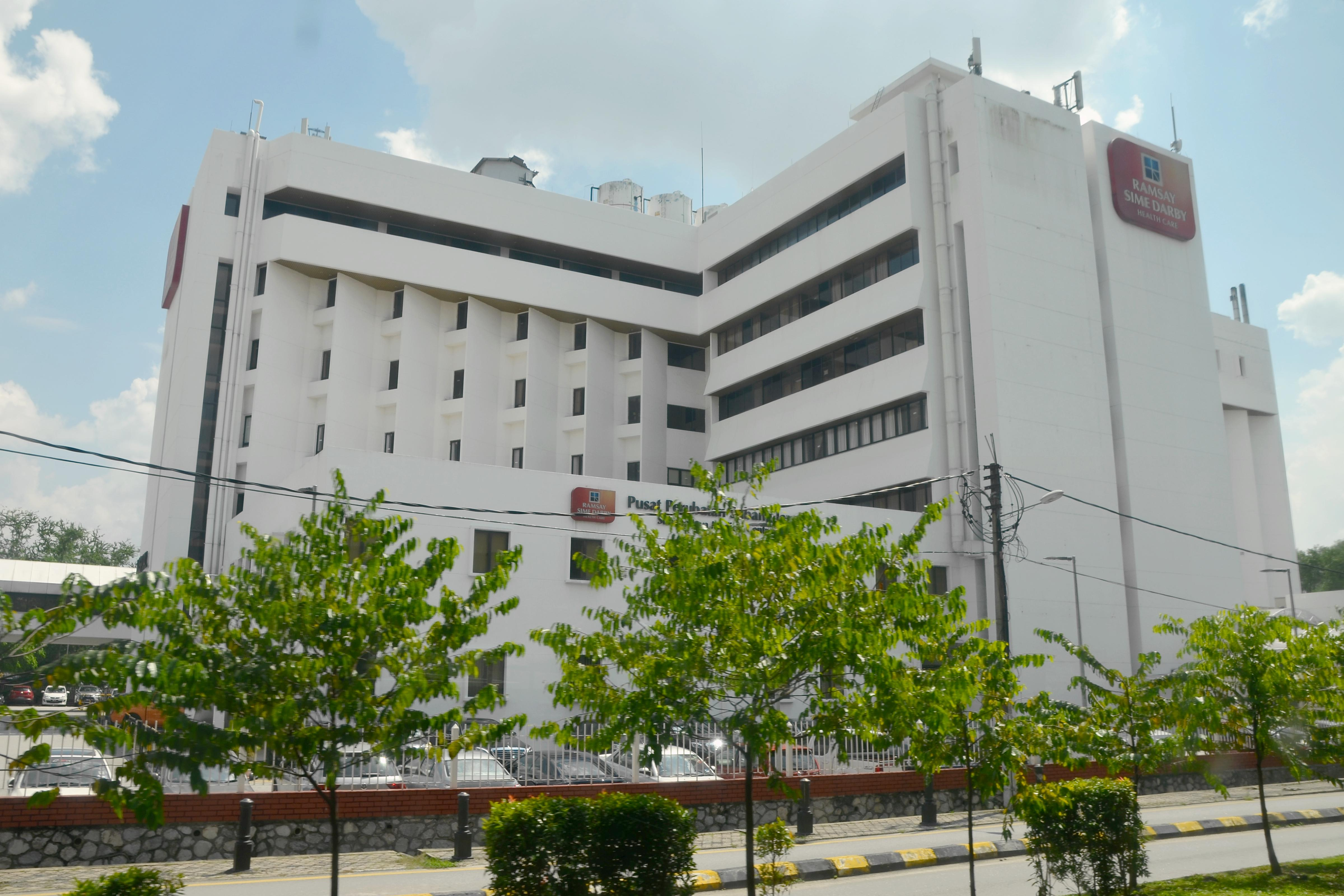
Subang Jaya Medical Centre in SS12

Healthcare in Subang Jaya is provided by two private hospitals; the Subang Jaya Medical Centre (SJMC), also formerly known as Sime Darby Medical Centre Subang Jaya until Ramsay Sime Darby Health Care Sdn Bhd exited the healthcare business and the shares are 100% acquired by Columbia Asia Healthcare Sdn Bhd and later renamed to Asia OneHealthcare Sdn Bhd in 2024 in SS12; along with Sunway Medical Centre in Bandar Sunway.

Under the 9th Malaysian Plan, Subang Jaya has its first public health clinic called the 1 Malaysia Healthcare located in Taman Subang Mewah area of USJ 1. Its primary objective is to provide cheaper healthcare for lower to middle-income population.

== Development ==
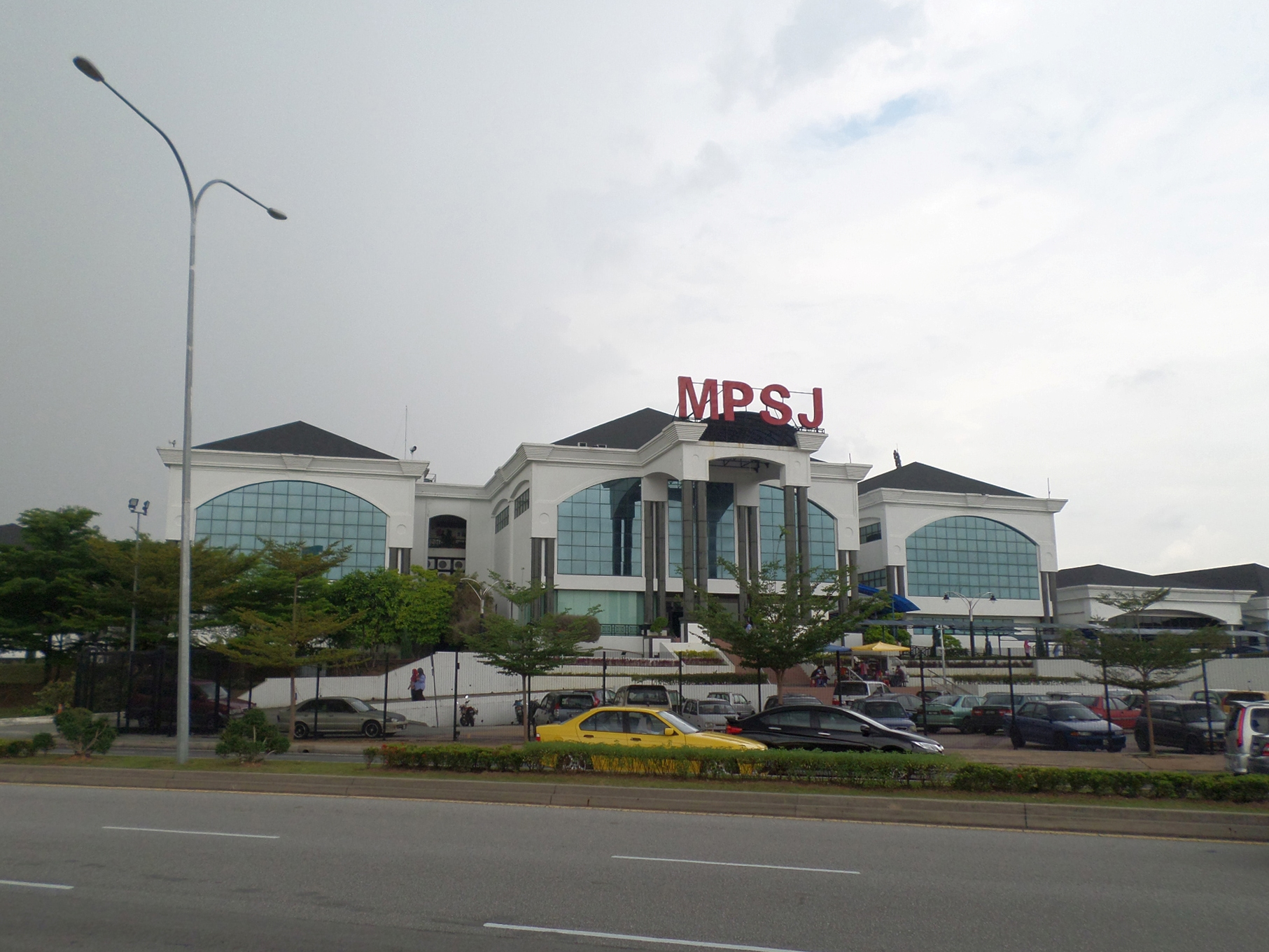
Subang Jaya City Council

Presently, there are three large mixed commercial projects under development in Subang Jaya which are SJCC Subang, SJ7 Trans-City and Tropicana Metropark. SJCC Subang and SJ7 Trans-City are two large mixed developments by Sime Darby that are set to be integrated with highly advanced public transportation. Da Men and Empire Remix are located in USJ 1. Da Men is a mixed commercial development sprawling over 8.6 acres (3.5 ha) of prime land comprising two blocks of serviced apartments, retail lots and a 6-story shopping podium. On the other hand, Empire Remix is also a mixed commercial development which consists of a few blocks of office buildings, serviced apartments and a shopping mall.

Tropicana Metropark is an 88.5 acres (35.8 ha) development comprising more than 10 high-rise buildings which include office suites, SOHO, office towers, business suites, villas, shopfronts and a shopping mall. It is situated near the upscale neighbourhoods of USJ Heights and Subang Heights, and is strategically located off the Federal Highway. A new access from Federal Highway will be completed by 2016 to improve the traffic flow around the area. On top of that, Bandar Raya Developments Bhd (BRDB) is developing an RM2 billion 24 acres of integrated mixed development around the same area.

== Transportation ==
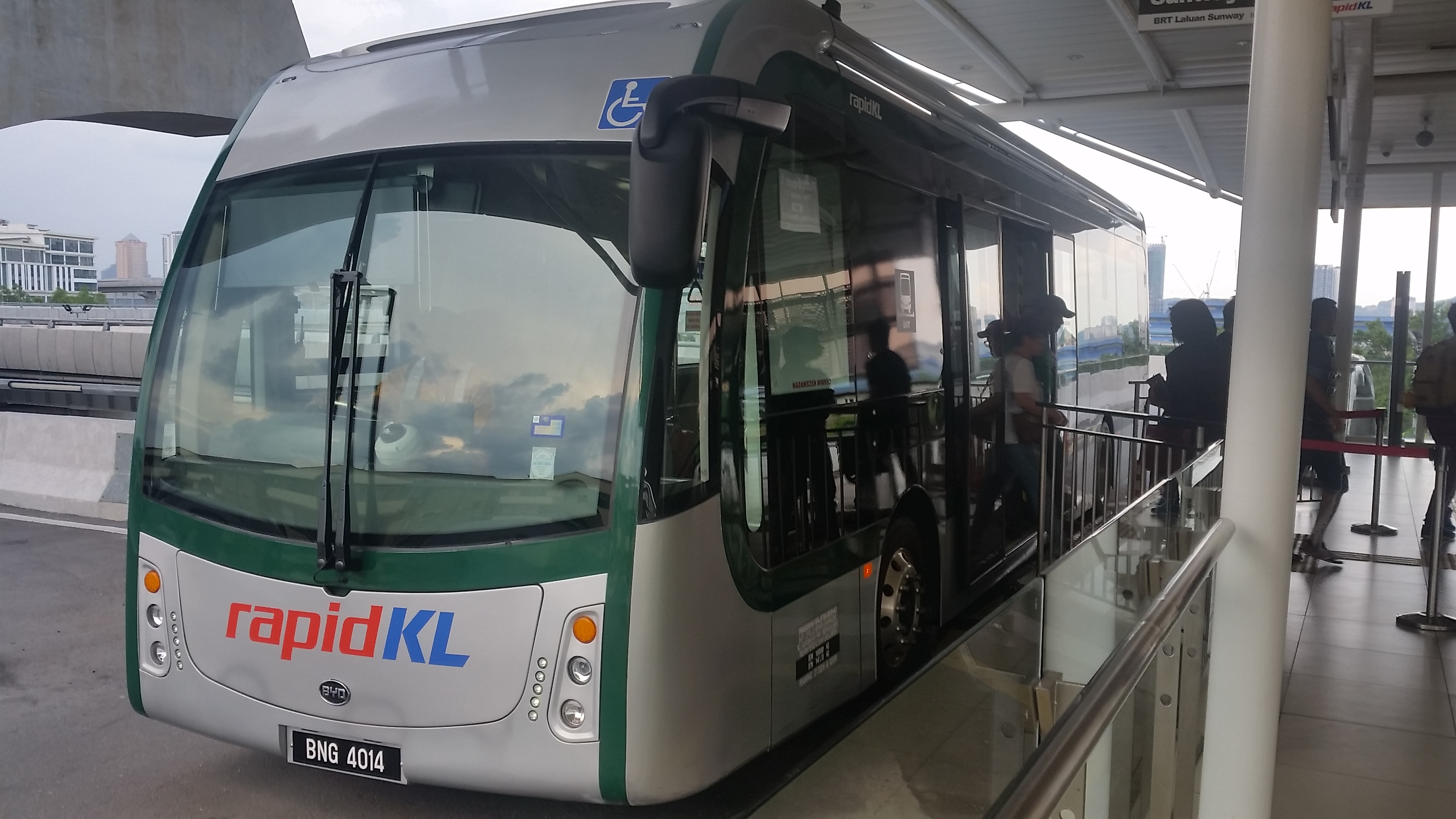
A BRT bus at USJ 7 BRT-LRT interchange station.

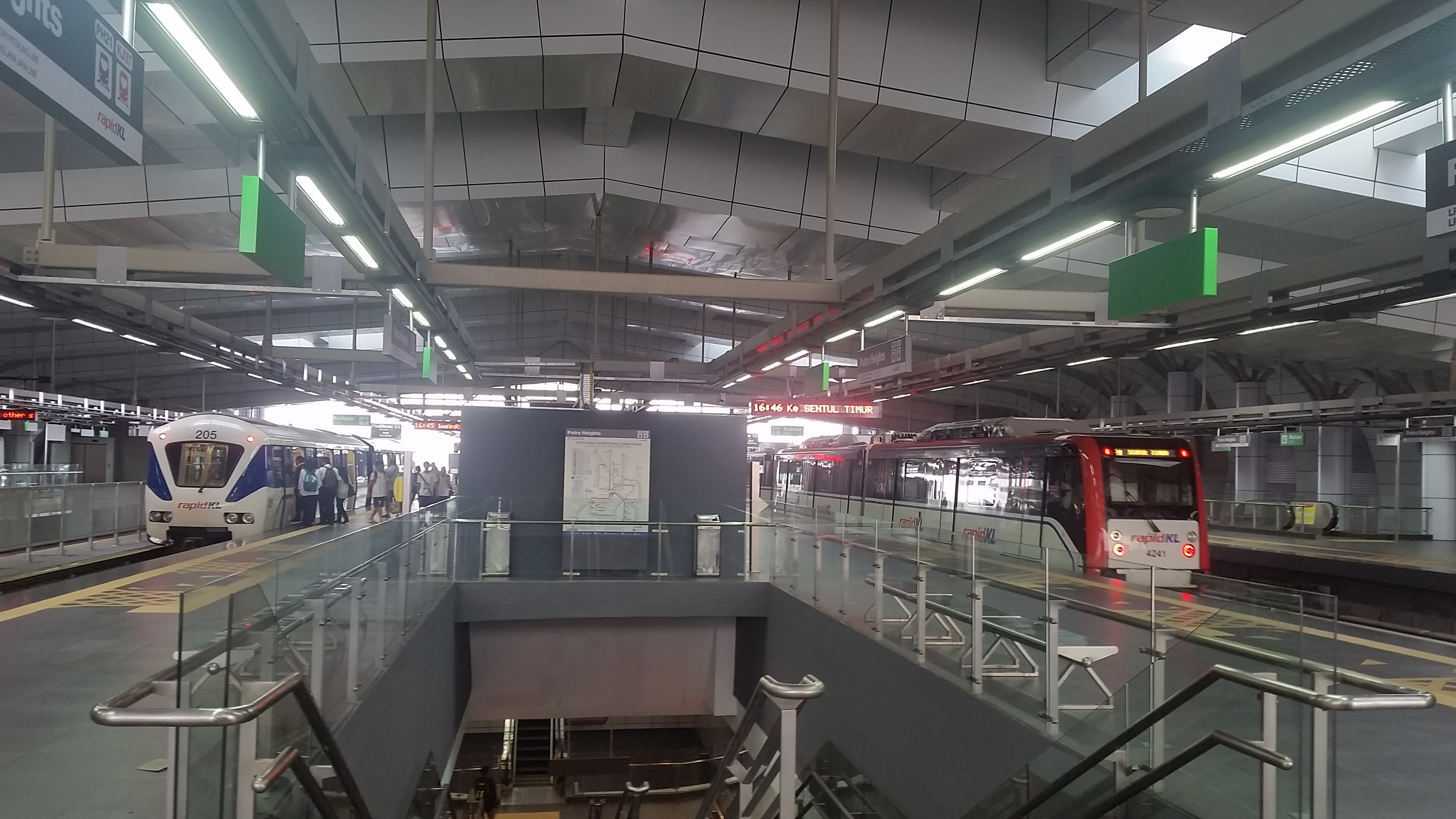
Commuters can switch between Kelana Jaya Line and Sri Petaling Line across a platform at Putra Heights LRT terminal.

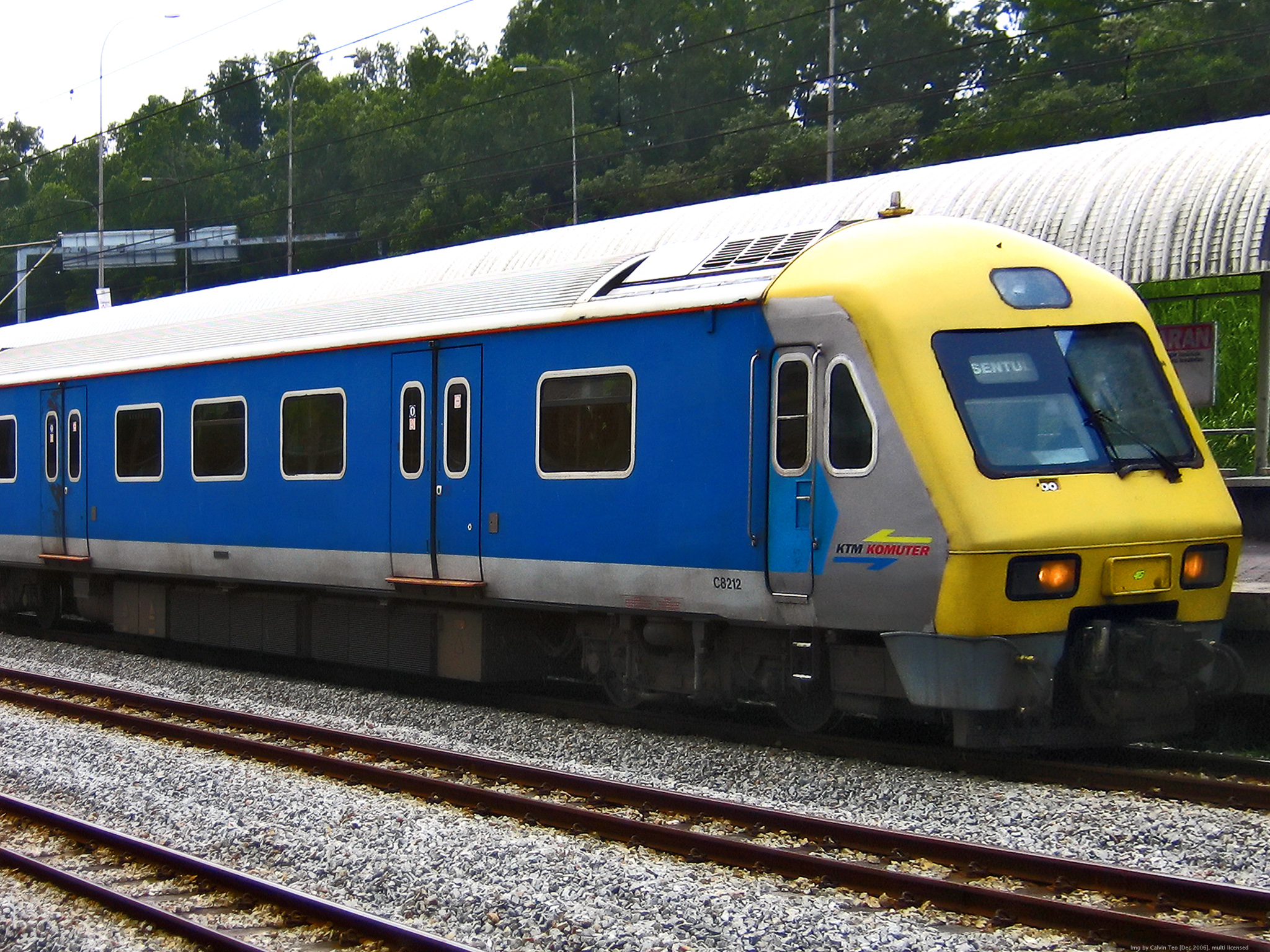
A KTM Komuter Class 82 EMU at Subang Jaya Komuter station.

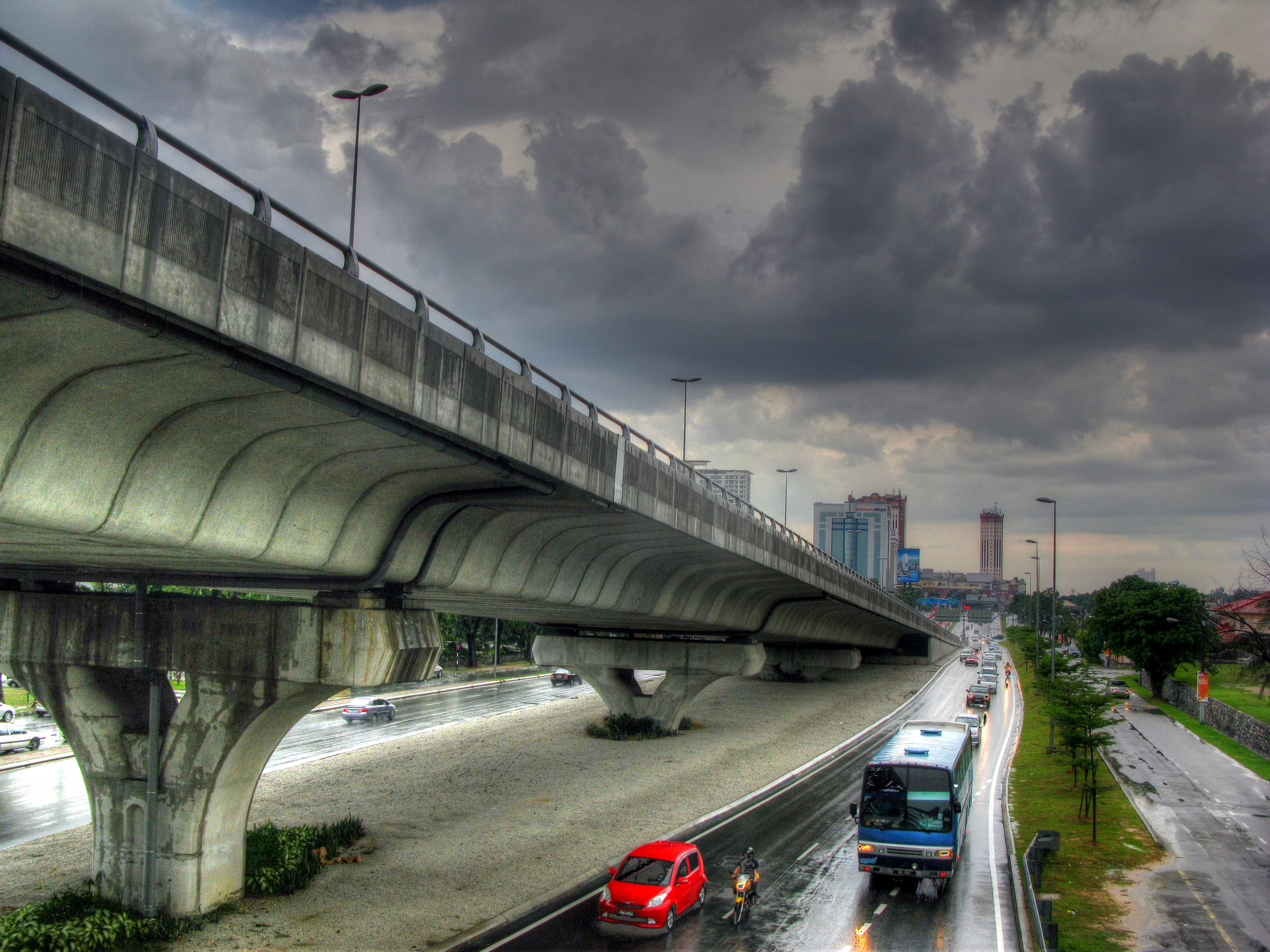
Traffic along Persiaran Kewajipan

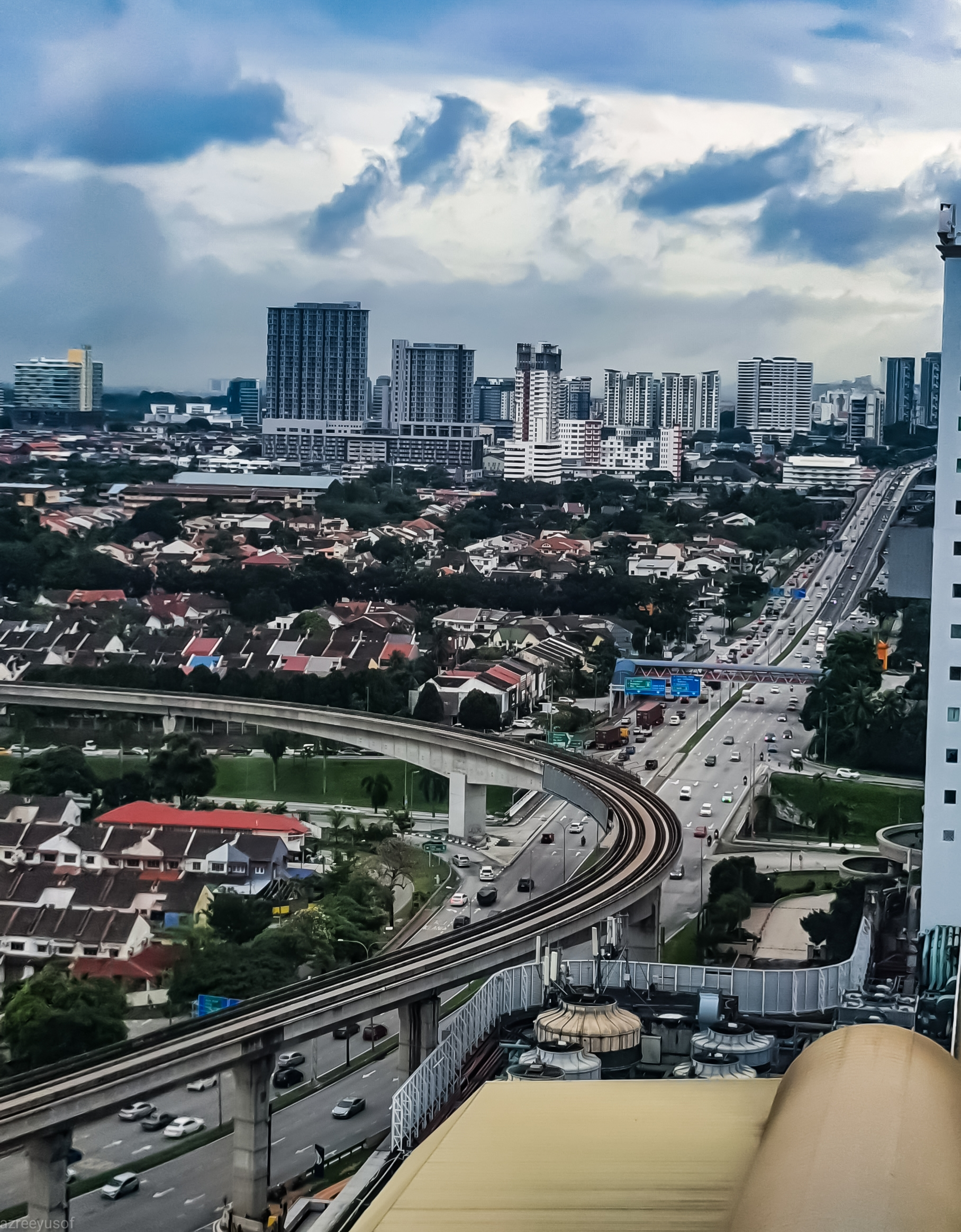
Persiaran Kewajipan, with the Kelana Jaya LRT Line spanning over it.

Subang Jaya is well-connected to the cities of Kuala Lumpur, Shah Alam, and the townships of Petaling Jaya such as Ara Damansara, Kota Damansara, Bandar Utama, Damansara Utama and Mutiara Damansara via a network of major highways, namely the Federal Highway, Shah Alam Expressway (KESAS), NKVE, NPE, North South Expressway, and LDP. There are three exits connecting Federal Highway to Subang Jaya. The two main exits are at exit 17.9 km through Persiaran Kewajipan and exit 18.2 km through Persiaran Tujuan, while the alternative exit is through Persiaran Teknologi Subang at Tropicana Metropark's direct interchange.

Persiaran Kewajipan and Persiaran Tujuan serve as the two major roads in Subang Jaya. The alternative route from USJ and Subang Jaya to Kuala Lumpur and Petaling Jaya is the Subang–Kelana Jaya Link, which also connects the Persiaran Kewajipan roundabout of the New Pantai Expressway towards the Subang Airport expressway (route 15) of Federal Highway Federal Route 2.

Subang Jaya's public transport system is highly developed, boasting 2 light rail transit (LRT) lines, 1 KTM commuter line, 1 bus rapid transit (BRT) line, as well as bus and taxi services. Since 30 June 2016, many new LRT stations of the extended Kelana Jaya Line have opened, connecting various areas in Subang Jaya with Kuala Lumpur city centre and Petaling Jaya. The LRT stations are strategically located within walking distance from shopping malls, commercial centres, and residential areas and supported by feeder buses. The Kelana Jaya Line had been extended from the existing route from the Subang LRT Depot at Lembah Subang, running through the Dana 1 commercial centre in Kelana Jaya, to Kelana Centre Point, then to Subang Parade (interchange with KTM Subang Jaya commuter station) which covers three stations within the town centre. Within USJ, the LRT line continues from SS18 to USJ 7 (Da Men and Summit), USJ Taipan, Wawasan (USJ 15), USJ 21 (One City and Main Place), and ends at the main interchange station hub in Putra Heights, which connects with another LRT line, the Sri Petaling Line to Puchong, Bukit Jalil, and Sungai Besi. In addition, six MRT Putrajaya line stations are located in southern part of Subang Jaya City Council area serving Seri Kembangan and Serdang.

On the other hand, public bus transportation is provided by two companies, RapidKL and Metrobus. These buses provide access around the town and also to Kuala Lumpur. Alternatively, there is a BRT line connecting the Setia Jaya Komuter station through Bandar Sunway to the USJ7 LRT Station. The BRT Sunway Line started operating on 1 June 2015, when it was officially launched by Malaysia prime minister, Najib Razak. The BRT service is a public-private partnership project between Prasarana and Sunway Group which aims to provide eco-friendly electric bus services on elevated tracks for residents in Bandar Sunway and USJ.

As for commuter train services, Subang Jaya is served by an urban-suburb rail link, the KTM Komuter, which provides transportation towards Port Klang and Kuala Lumpur.

The Sultan Abdul Aziz Shah Airport is located at Subang, Shah Alam. It serves as the main hub for turboprop airlines Firefly (a low-cost carrier subsidiary of Malaysia Airlines), Malindo Air and Berjaya Air and is the premier hub for corporate and private aviation in Southeast Asia.

== Public facilities ==
The city has 2 public libraries.

There is a crematorium in Batu 14, Puchong.

== Sister cities ==
- Hioki, Kagoshima, Japan
