= Subang Jaya National Secondary School =

Sekolah Menengah Kebangsaan Subang Jaya
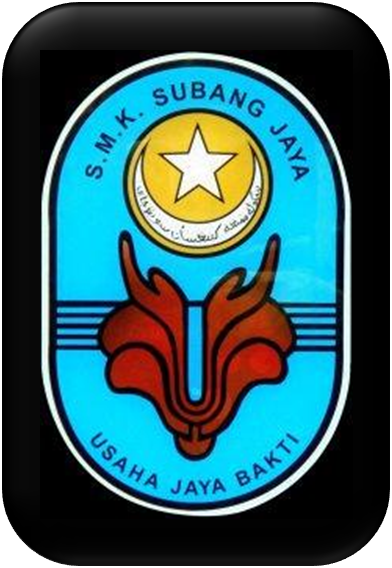

Location
- Jalan SS14/6; Subang Jaya, Selangor, 47500; Malaysia
- Coordinates: 3.0694937°N 101.5902114°E

Information
- Other name: SMKSJ
- Type: National secondary school
- Motto: Usaha, Jaya, Bakti (Effort, Success, Devotion)
- Established: 1981
- Principal: Puan Pengetua, Puan Rafidah binti Rashid
- Grades: Loyal Transition (Peralihan Setia), Form 1 to Form 5
- Gender: Male, Female
- Age range: 13-17
- Language: Bahasa Melayu, English, Mandarin, Tamil, Japanese, Arabic
- Website: www.smksj.edu.my

Sekolah Menengah Kebangsaan Subang Jaya (SMKSJ, formerly Sekolah Menengah Subang Jaya) is a secondary school in Subang Jaya, Selangor, Malaysia.

SMK Subang Jaya was established on January 1, 1981.

== Notable alumni ==
- Ong Beng Hee, squash player
- Joel Neoh Eu-Jin, businessman
