= Ken Yeang =

Malaysian skyscraper architect

- Born: 1946 (age 79–80); Penang, Malaysia
- Education: AA School (London), Cambridge University (UK)
- Occupation: Architect
- Practice: Ken Yeang Design International (UK); T. R. Hamzah & Yeang Sdn. Bhd. (Malaysia); North Hamzah Yeang Architectural and Engineering Company (China)
- Buildings: Menara Mesiniaga, National Library of Singapore

Ken Yeang

Chinese name
- Traditional Chinese: 楊經文
- Jyutping: Joeng4 Ging1 Man4
- Hokkien POJ: Iûⁿ Keng-bûn

Ken Yeang (born 6 October 1948) is a Malaysian architect, ecologist, planner and author, noted for his work in ecological architecture and eco-masterplanning. Since the early 1970s he has developed an approach to design grounded in ecology and environmental sustainability. In 2008, The Guardian included him in its list of "50 people who could save the planet". Yeang’s architectural practice, Hamzah & Yeang, is based in Kuala Lumpur, with associated offices in London as Llewelyn Davies Ken Yeang Ltd. and in Beijing as the North Hamzah Yeang Architectural and Engineering Company.

Yeang was awarded the Merdeka Award in 2011 under the Environment and Planetary Health category.

== Biography ==
=== Formative Years ===
Yeang was born in Penang, Malaysia, he attended Penang Free School (1961-1962) and entered Cheltenham College (Gloucestershire,1962-1967).

He qualified in architecture from the AA (Architectural Association) School of Architecture (London) where he did freelance illustrations and graphic work for the AD, AAQ magazines and for the AA. His dissertation at Cambridge University, "A Theoretical Framework for Incorporating Ecological Considerations in the Design and Planning of the Built Environment" earned him a PhD, published as ‘Designing With Nature’ (McGraw-Hill, 1995) and as 'Proyectar Con La Naturaleza’ (Gustavo Gili, SA, 1999). Academically, he holds the Distinguished Plym Professor chair (University of Illinois, USA, 2005). His honorary degrees include D.Litt.(Hon.) (Sheffield University, UK 2004), PhD (Hon.) (University of Malaya, 2013), D. Arch (Hon.) (Universidad Ricardo Palma, Peru 2016), D.Sc (Hon..) (Taylors University, Malaysia 2017).

=== Professional career ===
He is registered as an architect with ARB (Architects Registration Board) (UK, 1972), RIBA (Royal Institute of Architects) (UK), PAM (Pertubuhan Arkitek Malaysia), and Singapore Institute of Architects (SIA). He is a Fellow of the SIA, Fellow (Hon.) of the AIA (American institute of Architects), Fellow (Hon.) of the Royal Incorporation of Architects in Scotland, and Fellow (Hon.) Wolfson College, Cambridge University.

Yeang interned at S.T.S. Leong (Singapore, 1969–70), worked at Louis de Soisson Partnership (1969), Akitek Bersekutu (Kuala Lumpur,1974) and joined fellow AA alumni, Tengku Datuk Robert Hamzah as T. R. Hamzah & Rakan-Rakan) (1975) which became T. R . Hamzah & Yeang Sdn. Bhd. (1976). Yeang also served as Design Director and Chairman for Llewelyn Davies Ken Yeang (UK, 2005) until it was dissolved in 2012 .

Yeang has completed over 12 bioclimatic eco high-rise buildings, several thousand dwellings (terraced houses), over two million sq. ft. interior design space, numerous eco-master plans and eco-city designs.

Yeang lectures extensively at conferences and schools of architecture (over 30 countries worldwide). He currently holds the Distinguished Plym Professorship chair (University of Illinois). He has been Professor of Practice (Texas A & M University, Graham Willis Professor (University of Sheffield), Provost’s Distinguished Visiting Scholar (University of Southern California), Visiting Eminent Scholar (Florida Atlantic University), Advisory Professor (Tongji University, Shanghai), Honorary Professor (University of Hong Kong), misc. Adjunct Professorships (Royal Melbourne Institute of Technology, University of Hawaii, University of New South Wales, Curtin University, University of Malaya, Deakin University),

His key built work include the Roof-Roof House (Malaysia), Menara Mesiniaga (IBM franchise) (Malaysia), National Library Singapore (Singapore), Solaris (with CPG Consultants, Singapore), Spire Edge Tower (with Abraxas Architects, India), DiGi Data Centre (Malaysia), Great Ormond Street Children's Hospital Extension (under Llewelyn Davies Yeang, UK), the Genome Research Building (Hong Kong with ALKF & Associates), Suasana Putrajaya (Putrajaya, 2017).

=== Work on Ecological Design ===
Yeang’s research has focused on ecological architecture and masterplanning, particularly on the integration of built structures with natural systems. His approach emphasizes bioclimatic design, climate-responsive, passive, and low-energy strategies, as part of a broader ecological framework. He has also explored how biodiversity can be incorporated into buildings through habitat creation and vegetation systems.

One of his early experimental projects was his own residence, the Roof-Roof House (1985) in Selangor, Malaysia, which included features such as a louvred roof canopy for solar shading, wind-directing walls, and a pool designed to assist with evaporative cooling. Elements from this house informed his later large-scale work.

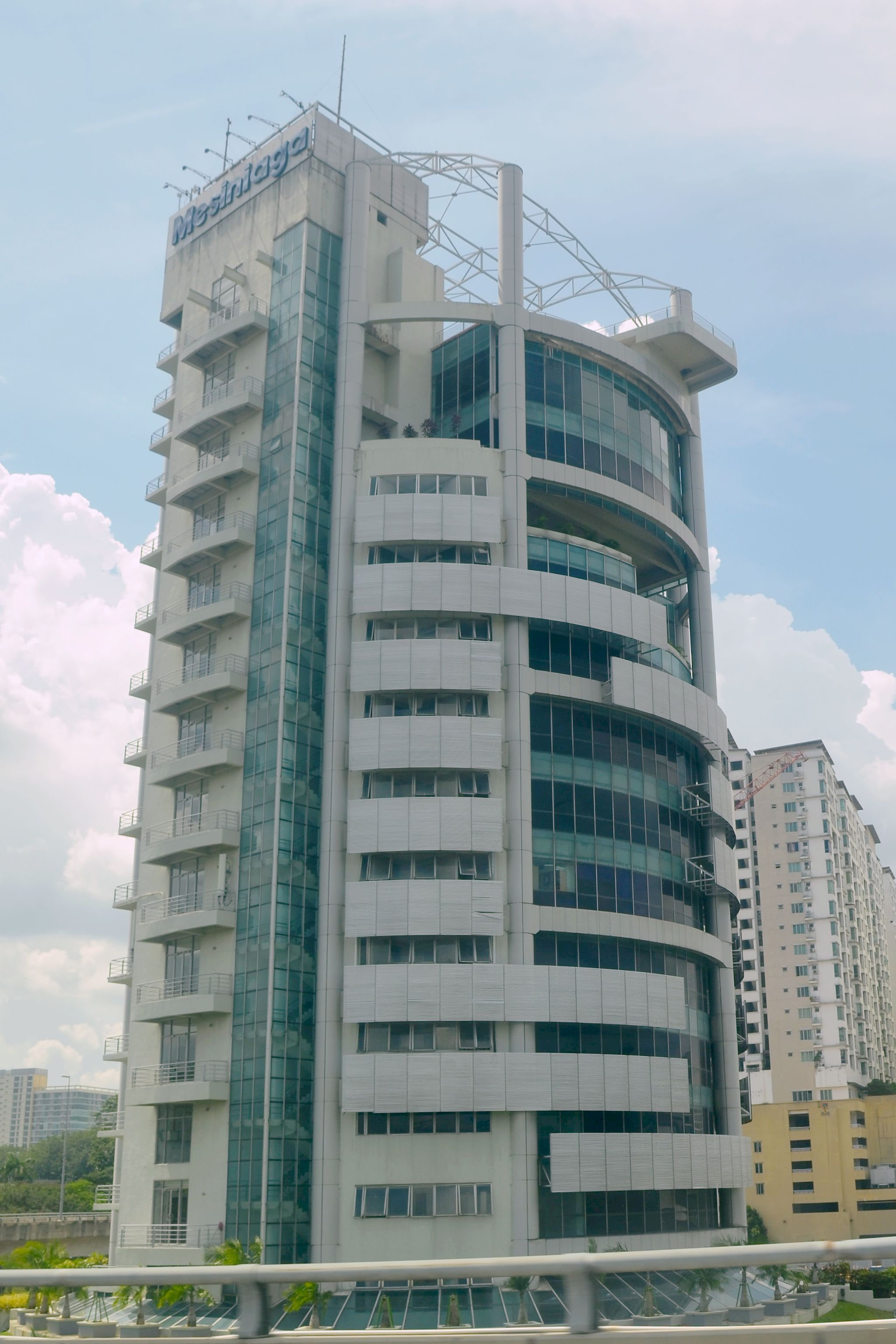
The Mesiniaga Tower with its elevator core on the left side of the photograph

Yeang extended his principles to high-rise design, developing the concept of the “bioclimatic skyscraper.” The Mesiniaga Tower (1992), an office building for IBM in Subang Jaya, Malaysia, incorporated strategies such as a shaded façade, recessed terraces, a rooftop pool, and a vegetated exterior. The building received the Aga Khan Award for Architecture in 1995 and other regional architectural awards.

In Singapore, Yeang’s Solaris building (2008) featured a continuous vegetated ramp forming a “vertical linear park,” integrating green spaces into the circulation of the tower. His later projects, such as Suasana Putrajaya (2017) and the National Library of Singapore (2005), further developed ideas of “vertical green urbanism,” including sky gardens, naturally ventilated atria, and green infrastructure networks. He has also applied these principles internationally in projects such as the SOMA Masterplan in Bangalore, India, and the Spire Edge Tower in Gurgaon, India.

Yeang’s theoretical work includes proposals for “eco-mimicry,” or designing buildings and cities as constructed ecosystems that reflect ecological processes and structures rather than imitating their appearance. His doctoral research at the University of Cambridge in the 1970s laid out a systemic model for eco-design, which continues to inform his later architectural and planning work.

== Key Projects ==
Yeang has completed over 200 built projects since 1975. His benchmark buildings, projects and their innovations include:

- The EDITT Tower (unbuilt) – Waterloo Road, Singapore – a 2ndn prize winner, EDITT competition.

The project has been published in over 30 international publications for its hirsute extensively-vegetated ramp façade and aesthetic.

- The Roof Roof House – Selangor, Malaysia (1985) – an experimental climate-responsive house that rethought bioclimatic passive-mode low-energy building design.
- Menara Mesiniaga Tower – Selangor, Malaysia (1992) – a climate-responsive tower that exemplifies Yeang’s key principles for 'bioclimatic skyscraper' design, and received the Aga Khan Award for Architecture, the RAIA (Royal Australian Institute of Architects) International Award, the Malaysian institute of Architects Design Award.
- Kowloon Waterfront Masterplan – Hong Kong (c. 1998) – a green masterplan where Yeang developed the green eco infrastructure concept and the novel use of 'eco cells'.
- National Library – Singapore (2005) – a green library tower (120m) with large landscaped sky courts (40m high) that received the BCA Green Mark Platinum Award 2005, and the Singapore Institute of Architects Award.
- SOMA Masterplan – Bangalore, India (2006) – a signature eco masterplan that espouses his innovative idea for eco city masterplanning as the integration of four eco infrastructures, with the use of eco bridges and eco undercrofts to enable an ecological nexus across the terrain.
- DiGi Technical Office – Shah Alam, Malaysia (2010) – advances the idea of a 'living' eco wall as a nexus of greenery linking all the facades. It received the Malaysian Institute of Architects Design Award (Commendation, 2010) and Green Building Index Gold rating.
- Solaris Tower – 1-north, Singapore (2010) [with CPG Consult]- with a 1.5 km long 'Vertical Linear Park' vegetated ramp that wraps itself around the tower's façade, a diagonal light-shaft, automated glass-louvers roof over the atrium, rain-check walls at the ground floor, which received the Singapore Institute of Architects Award (2011), the Malaysian institute of Architects Gold Award 2011, the WACA (World Association of Chinese Architects) Gold Medal 2011 and BCA Green Mark Platinum rating.
- Spire Edge Tower – (Gurgaon, Haryana, India), under construction with anticipated completion 2013, a signature tower that espouses the idea of a vertical green eco infrastructure, LEED Platinum rating.
- Ganendra Art House – Petaling Jaya, Malaysia (2011) – Art Gallery with accommodation for live-in artist has an experimental 'down-draft' ventilating flue for enhancing comfort cooling, received the Malaysian Institute of Architects Design Award (Commendation) 2010, Green Building Index certification rating.
- The Great Ormond Street Children's Hospital Extension Phase 1 (2011) [with Llewelyn Davies Yeang] – London, UK, BREEAM 'excellent rating'
- GyeongGi Development, Seoul, Korea (unbuilt) – habitat creation that exemplifies the use of a Biodiversity Matrix that makes the development into a total 'living system'..

== Projects (construction completion year) ==
- Plaza Atrium, Kuala Lumpur, 1981
- Roof-Roof house, Kuala Lumpur 1985
- Menara Boustead, Kuala Lumpur, 1986
- Menara Mesiniaga, Subang Jaya, Malaysia, 1992
- MBF Tower, Penang, Malaysia,1993
- TA1 Tower, Kuala Lumpur, Malaysia.
- TTDI The Plaza and Residence Towers and retail, Kuala Lumpur, Malaysia1996
- UMNO Tower, Penang, 1998
- Mutiara Mesiniaga Penang, Penang, 2003
- Mewah Oils Headquarters, Malaysia 2005
- National Library of Singapore, Singapore, 2005
- Limkokwing University of Creative Technology (Main campus, Cyberjaya), Malaysia, 2006
- TA2 Tower, Kuala Lumpur, Malaysia, 2005
- Ganendra Art House, Malaysia, 2010
- Calvary Convention Centre, Kuala Lumpur, Malaysia 2012
- Great Ormond Street Children's Hospital Extension Phase 1, London (UK) 2011)
- LGT Hijauan Towers, Kuala Lumpur, Malaysia (Completion 2018)
- Fu Gong Shan, Johore, Malaysia (2016)

== Other projects ==
- Tokyo-Nara Tower, Tokyo, Japan, 1994
- Elephant and Castle EcoTower, London
- Al-Asima, Kuwait
- CAAG Tower, London
- Enterprise Building 4, Cyberjaya, Malaysia
- Jabal Omar Towers, Mecca, Saudi Arabia
- Dubai Towers, UAE
- Beijing Mega Hall North
- Taipei Capital Plaza
- Chongqing Tower, China
- Vancouver Waterfront, Canada
- Premier City, Almaty, Kazakhstan

== Current projects under construction ==
- Putrajaya Phase 2C5 Towers (offices and retail) (Completion 2016)
- Y Cantonments, Penang, Malaysia (2015)

== Publications ==
- 1995 Designing With Nature: The Ecological Basis for Architectural Design, Mcgraw-Hill Designing with Nature
- 1997 Skyscraper, Bioclimatically Considered: A Design Primer, Wiley-Academy Skyscraper-Bioclimatically-Considered
- 2000 The Green Skyscraper: The Basis for Designing Sustainable Intensive Buildings, Prestel
- 2002 Reinventing the Skyscraper: A Vertical Theory of Urban Design, Academy Press
- 2007 Eco Skyscrapers, Images Publishing
- 2008 Ecodesign: A Manual for Ecological Design, Wiley
- 2009 EcoMasterplanning, Wiley
- 2011 Ecoarchitecture: The Work of Ken Yeang, Ecoarchitecture

== Sources ==
- Hart, Sara, Ecoarchitecture – The Work of Ken Yeang, John Wiley & Sons (2011), UK
- Powell, Robert Rethinking the Skyscraper: the complete architecture of Ken Yeang, Thames & Hudson (1999), ISBN 0-500-28155-6
