= Subang–Kelana Jaya Link =

Federal Route 15
- Subang-Kelana Jaya Link

Route information
- Maintained by Malaysian Public Works Department
- Existed: 2005–present
- History: Completed in 2009

Major junctions
- North end: Subang-Federal Highway Interchange; FT 2 Federal Highway
- FT 15 Sultan Abdul Aziz Shah Airport Highway; FT 2 Federal Highway; New Pantai Expressway; Persiaran Kewajipan
- South end: Persiaran Kewajipan

Location
- Country: Malaysia
- Primary destinations: Subang Jaya, UEP Subang Jaya, Glenmarie, Ara Damansara, Subang, Subang Airport, Kuala Lumpur

Highway system
- Highways in Malaysia; Expressways; Federal; State

Subang–Kelana Jaya Link, Federal Route 15, is an elevated highway in Subang Jaya, Selangor, Malaysia. The highway connected from Persiaran Kewajipan to the Sultan Abdul Aziz Shah Airport Highway and Federal Highway. This elevated highway was constructed on 2005 by the Malaysian Public Works Department (JKR) and the main contractor Ahmad Zaki Resources Berhad (AZRB) and it was opened in 2009. It is the tallest elevated highway in Subang Jaya.

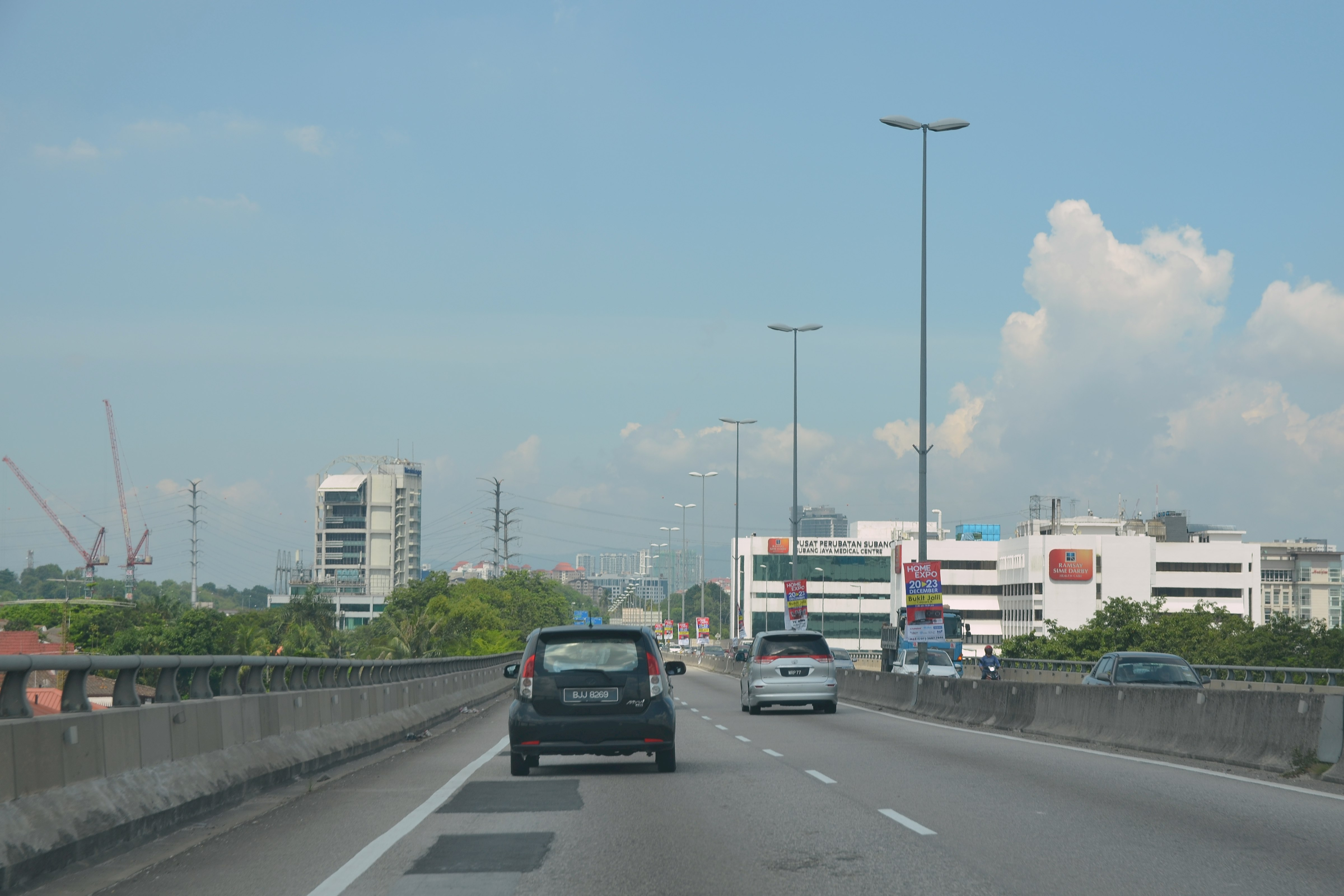
View of the Mesiniaga Tower (left) and Subang Jaya Medical Centre (right) from the Subang–Kelana Jaya Link

== Junction lists ==
The entire route is located in Petaling District, Selangor.

Legend:

- I/C - Interchange, I/S - Intersection, RSA - Rest and service area, OBR - Overhead bridge restaurant, R/R - Restaurant and rest plaza, L/B - Layby, V/P - Vista point, TN - tunnel, T/P - Toll plaza, BR - Bridge
- C - Cloverleaf, S - Stack, T-A - Trumpet-A, T-B - Trumpet-B, DT - Directional-T/Y, SDT - Semi-Directional-T/Y, P-Y - Partial-Y, D - Diamond, P-C - Partial cloverleaf, D-D - Diverging diamond, D-R - Direct ramp

Location	km	mi	Exit	Name	Destinations	Notes
Subang Jaya			Through to FT 15 Sultan Abdul Aziz Shah Airport Highway			
Subang Jaya				Subang-Federal Highway I/C	FT 2 Federal Highway – Petaling Jaya, Kuala Lumpur	Stacked interchange East only
Subang Jaya			Kewajipan Flyover; Railway crossing bridge			
Subang Jaya				Kewajipan Flyover; Persiaran Kewajipan ramp off	Persiaran Kewajipan – SS 15, SS 12, Sime Darby Medical Centre Subang Jaya; New Pantai Expressway – Persiaran Tujuan, Shah Alam, Klang, Glenmarie, Bandar Sunway, Petaling Jaya, Bangsar, Kuala Lumpur	Ramp off from FT15
Subang Jaya				Kewajipan Flyover; Kewajipan Roundabout	New Pantai Expressway – Persiaran Tujuan, Shah Alam, Klang, Glenmarie, Bandar Sunway, Petaling Jaya, Bangsar, Kuala Lumpur	Multi-level stacked roundabout interchange
Subang Jaya			Through to Persiaran Kewajipan			
1.000 mi = 1.609 km; 1.000 km = 0.621 mi: Concurrency terminus; Incomplete access; Route transition
