= Fairview International School =

Location
- Wangsa Maju, Kuala Lumpur; Malaysia; 3.1959°N 101.7521°E

Information
- Type: International Baccalaureate (IB)
- Established: 1978
- Website: www.fairview.edu.my

Fairview International School is an International Baccalaureate (IB) school, headquartered in Wangsa Maju, Kuala Lumpur. It also has campuses in Subang Jaya, Ipoh, Penang Island, Johor Bahru and Scotland.

== Background ==
Fairview International School (FIS) is a private international school located in Kuala Lumpur, Malaysia. Campuses are authorised to offer the three IB programmes: the Primary Years Programme (PYP) for students aged 5 to 10 years, the Middle Years Programme (MYP) for students aged 11 to 16 years, as well as the Diploma Programme (DP) for students aged 17 to 20 years, giving some campuses the IB continuum recognition.

Fairview International School campuses total to about 4,000 students, representing over 55 nationalities.

The campuses and their authorised IB programmes are as follows:

- Kuala Lumpur - Primary Years Programme, Middle Years Programme, and the Diploma Programme
- Subang Jaya - Primary Years Programme and Middle Years Programme
- Penang - Primary Years Programme, Middle Years Programme, and the Diploma Programme
- Johor - Primary Years Programme and Middle Years Programme
- Ipoh Campus - Primary Years Programme and Middle Years Programme
- Scotland, UK - Primary Years Programme, Middle Years Programme, and the Diploma Programme

== History ==
Fairview International School Kuala Lumpur was founded in 1978 by a group of educators.

== Subjects ==
In the MYP, students study the following subject groups, in line with MYP on-screen examinations and ePortfolio known as eAssessment:

- Language and literature: English or Mandarin
- Mathematics: Standard (for both lower and upper MYP) or Extended (for upper MYP)
- General science (for lower MYP) or the Sciences: Biology, Chemistry, and/or Physics (for upper MYP)
- Language acquisition: Mandarin (at the emergent, capable, or proficient level)
- Physical and health education
- Performing arts: Music (not available for ePortfolio)
- Visual arts
- Design
- Individuals and societies: Integrated humanities

Students at the lower level of MYP (M1 to M3) will take all subjects, while upper MYP students (M4 to M5) will have to attend classes according to their subject choice. Additionally, all Malaysian students are required to take Bahasa Melayu, in line with MOE requirements and guidelines.

Fairview does not claim to be halal, they do serve pork throughout their lunch meals as well as breakfast.

== Outdoor learning ==
In Fairview, grade levels P5 to M5 have one academic expedition trips overseas in line with their studies, alongside camps to Fairview Eduresort in Port Dickson every academic year. Common destinations typically include Southeast Asian countries, such as Singapore, Indonesia, Vietnam, Cambodia, Thailand; upper MYP grades typically visit countries such as China and the UK]. The Port Dickson camps apply to all students from P4 onwards.

== Notable alumni ==
Han (musician) - South Korean rapper, member of the famous South Korean boy band Stray Kids
