= Sri Kuala Lumpur =

Educational institution in Subang Jaya, Petaling District, Selangor, Malaysia

Sri Kuala Lumpur International School

Location
- 1, Jalan SS 15/7A; Subang Jaya, Selangor, 47500; Malaysia; 3.0752°N 101.5926°E

Information
- Type: Primary and secondary school
- Motto: Malay: Kemajuan melalui Pemahaman (Progress through Understanding)
- Established: 1979
- Founder: Tan Sri Dato’ Ir. Othman Merican
- Status: Open
- Principal: Secondary School: Mr Tan Sun Seng; Primary School: Dr Cheah Swi Ee
- CEO: Hanif Othman Merican
- Gender: Co-educational
- Enrollment: More than 67
- Education system: Cambridge Primary Checkpoint & IGCSE
- Language: English, Bahasa Malaysia
- Houses: Blue; Green; Red; Yellow
- Slogan: International Excellence and Values
- Song: Pride to Sri KL (Men of Harlech)
- Yearbook: The Athenaeum
- Alumni: Athenaean
- Website: www.srikl.edu.my

Sri Kuala Lumpur International School (Sri KL) is a Malaysian private non-profit educational institution located in Subang Jaya, Petaling District, Selangor, Malaysia.

The school was founded as Sri Kuala Lumpur Primary School in 1967, with Sri Kuala Lumpur Secondary School being officially incorporated in 1967. It is wholly owned and managed by Othman Merican Educational Development Berhad, a not-for-profit foundation.

The medium of instruction at Sri KL is predominantly English.

In national competitions, such as The Star R.AGE Cheerleading Competition, the school's team has won the national title multiple times. The school's orchestra and wind band perform at national and international competitions as well. Sri KL actively participates in MSSD and gained victories in golf, tennis, squash, waterpolo, tasmanian testicle tag, table tennis, ice hockey, pickeball, paddle, gymnastics, muay thai, weight lifting events, boxing, volleyball, american football, rugby, sepak takraw, basketball, netball, cross country and others.

== History ==
Sri Kuala Lumpur Primary School was established by the late Tan Sri Dato' Ir. Othman Merican in January 1978 at Jalan Nipah, Kuala Lumpur with an initial enrolment of six students. In August 1979, the school moved to Jalan Anak Gasing. Enrolment had increased to 100 by January 1980 and over 300, when it moved to Jalan Ampang 12 months later. A further move occurred in December 1984, to Taman Mayang, Petaling Jaya.

Finally, in January 1986 Sri KL moved to its current location in SS15, Subang Jaya. The secondary school was subsequently opened in 1987. In 2005, the then Education Minister, Dato Seri Hishamuddin Tun Hussein declared the new facilities block to be opened.

In 2010, Year 1 and 2 started the Cambridge international curriculum. In the same year, secondary students from Year 7 (Form 1) had the choice of studying the government (KBSM) or Cambridge syllabus. As of 2017, all primary students sit for the Cambridge Primary Checkpoint and secondary students sit for the Cambridge IGCSE exam. All students who are Malaysian citizens are required to sit for the Sijil Pelajaran Menengah (SPM) Bahasa Malaysia paper.

== School system ==
The academic year at Sri Kuala Lumpur starts in January and ends around mid-November. The school day starts at 0750hrs and ends at 1530hrs for primary school students, and 1540hrs for secondary school students.

Students are sorted into classes, which typically have 30 students each. Each class has two main teachers.

Primary school switched from the National syllabus to Cambridge Primary Programme in 2010.

Secondary school adopted the Cambridge IGCSE in 2010 and sit for the IGCSE exams. In addition, all secondary students who are Malaysian citizens are also required to sit for the Bahasa Malaysia paper in Sijil Pelajaran Menengah (SPM). Some students also opt to sit for the Youth Chinese Test.
