= Federal Highway =

Federal Highways and Federal Routes can be found in:

- Australia: Federal Highway
- Brazil: Brazilian Federal Highway and Brazilian Highway System
- Germany: Bundesstraßen
- Malaysia: Federal Highway and Malaysian Federal Roads System
- Mexico: Mexican Federal Highway
- Russia: Russian federal highways
- United States: United States Numbered Highways
  - In Florida, parts of U.S. Route 1 have the name Federal Highway.
