= Subang Parade =

Shopping mall in Petaling, Selangor, Malaysia

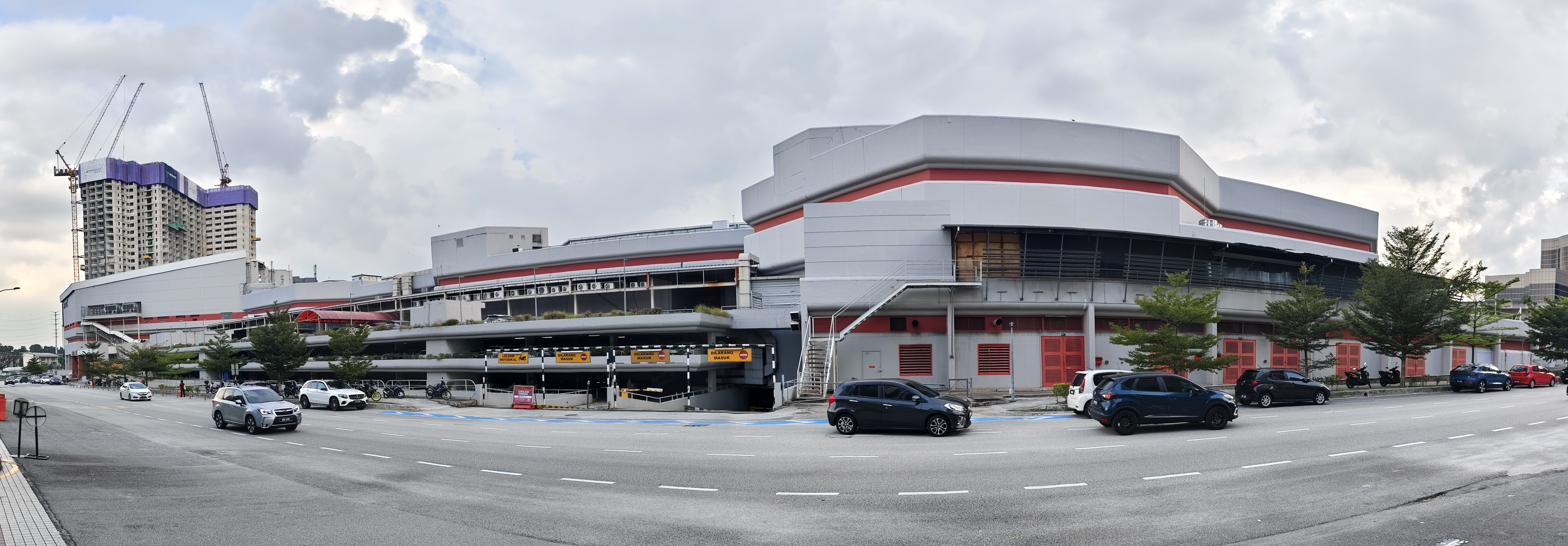
- Subang Parade in 2025
- Location: Subang Jaya, Selangor, Malaysia
- Coordinates: 3.082119°N 101.585448°E
- Opened: 13 August 1988
- Manager: Hektar Property Services
- Owner: Hektar REIT
- Num. of stores: 200
- Floors: 3
- Website: www.subangparade.com.my

Subang Parade is a shopping mall located in Subang Jaya, Selangor, Malaysia. The building has over 200 stores at a space of approximately 1,169,038 square feet (108,607.2 m^{2}) distributed in three floors. It is located just off the Malaysian Federal Highway, and is within walking distance to Darul Ehsan Mosque, Aeon Big (formerly Carrefour), Empire Shopping Gallery and Subang Jaya station.

== History ==
Originally known as Subang Jaya Shopping Centre, Subang Parade was opened in August 1988 and was the longest mall in Southeast Asia when it first opened. The inclusion of a mall came from Abd Aziz Mohamed who worked in Sime UEP. Subang Parade was originally owned by United Estates Projects Berhad and managed by Natvest, a subsidiary of Lion Group. Collings Hui Sdn Bhd acted as its first marketing agent.

Its first anchor tenant, Parkson Grand, opened in June 1988. Its second tenant, a 30,000 square feet (2,800 m^{2}) Toys "R" Us outlet, operating as a joint venture with Metro Holdings of Singapore, opened in November 1988, being the first Toys "R" Us in the country. Frozen yoghurt chain J Highby's opened in the same month.

A Grandy's outlet opened on 10 December 1988.

In 2003, Subang Parade was sold to The Hektar Group before being resold into the Hektar REIT in 2006 and became one of its shopping centres alongside Kulim Central and Central Square in Kedah, Wetex Parade and Segamat Central in Johor, and Mahkota Parade in Malacca.

Subang Parade has numerous facilities for fashion, food and also an arcade. The mall previously had a cinema, the SMILE-UA Cineplex but was closed in 2001. After 10 years, the mall now had its own cinema again. MBO cinemas first opened in 2011. Subang Parade underwent a facelift where it was refurbished in 2016. The mall offers dedicated areas for reading.

Following a partial lockdown from the COVID-19 pandemic in early 2020. Several social media posts alleged the closure of nine MPH stores nationwide including four in the Klang Valley. Statements from the Malay Mail stated that MPH staff members confirmed that the MPH outlets in Subang Parade will close on 6 June 2020. MBO cinemas was later closed and replaced by GSC Cinemas on 17 January 2022.

== See also ==
- List of shopping malls in Malaysia
