= Taipan (disambiguation) =

A taipan is an Australian venomous snake.

Taipan or Tai-Pan or Tai Pan may also refer to:

== Arts and entertainment ==
- Tai-Pan (novel), a 1966 novel by James Clavell
  - Tai-Pan (film), a 1986 film based on Clavell's novel
- "Taipan", a song from the album Circus Animals (1982) by the Australian band Cold Chisel
- Taipan, the new name for the Thrillseeker (roller coaster)
- Taipan!, a computer game for the Apple II and TRS-80
- "The Taipan", a 1922 short story by W. Somerset Maugham
- Tai Pan, the name of the card game Tichu in the Dutch-language market, published by 999 Games

== Ships ==
- HMAS Taipan, a Second World War Royal Australian Navy auxiliary vessel
- MV Taipan, a container ship freed in the action of 5 April 2010 from Somali pirates
- Taipan 28, a sailing yacht or sloop

== Other uses ==
- Taipan (corporate title), referring to a foreign-born senior business executive or entrepreneur operating in China or Hong Kong
- Albert Cheng (politician), a radio commentator-turned-politician in Hong Kong also known as Tai-pan
- Cairns Taipans, an Australasian National Basketball League team
- MRH-90 Taipan, Australian Defence Force name for the NH90 helicopter
- Taipan, alternative name for the mythical Australian Aboriginal creator-being, the Rainbow Serpent
- Taipan Business Centre, a commercial hub of UEP Subang Jaya, Malaysia
- TAIPAN galaxy survey (originally "Transforming Astronomical Imaging surveys through Polychromatic Analysis of Nebulae"), a large-scale spectroscopic survey underway at the UK Schmidt Telescope

== See also ==
- Steel Taipan, a steel roller coaster at Dreamworld
