= Wawasan LRT station =

Light rapid transit station in Subang Jaya, Selangor, Malaysia

KJ33 Wawasan
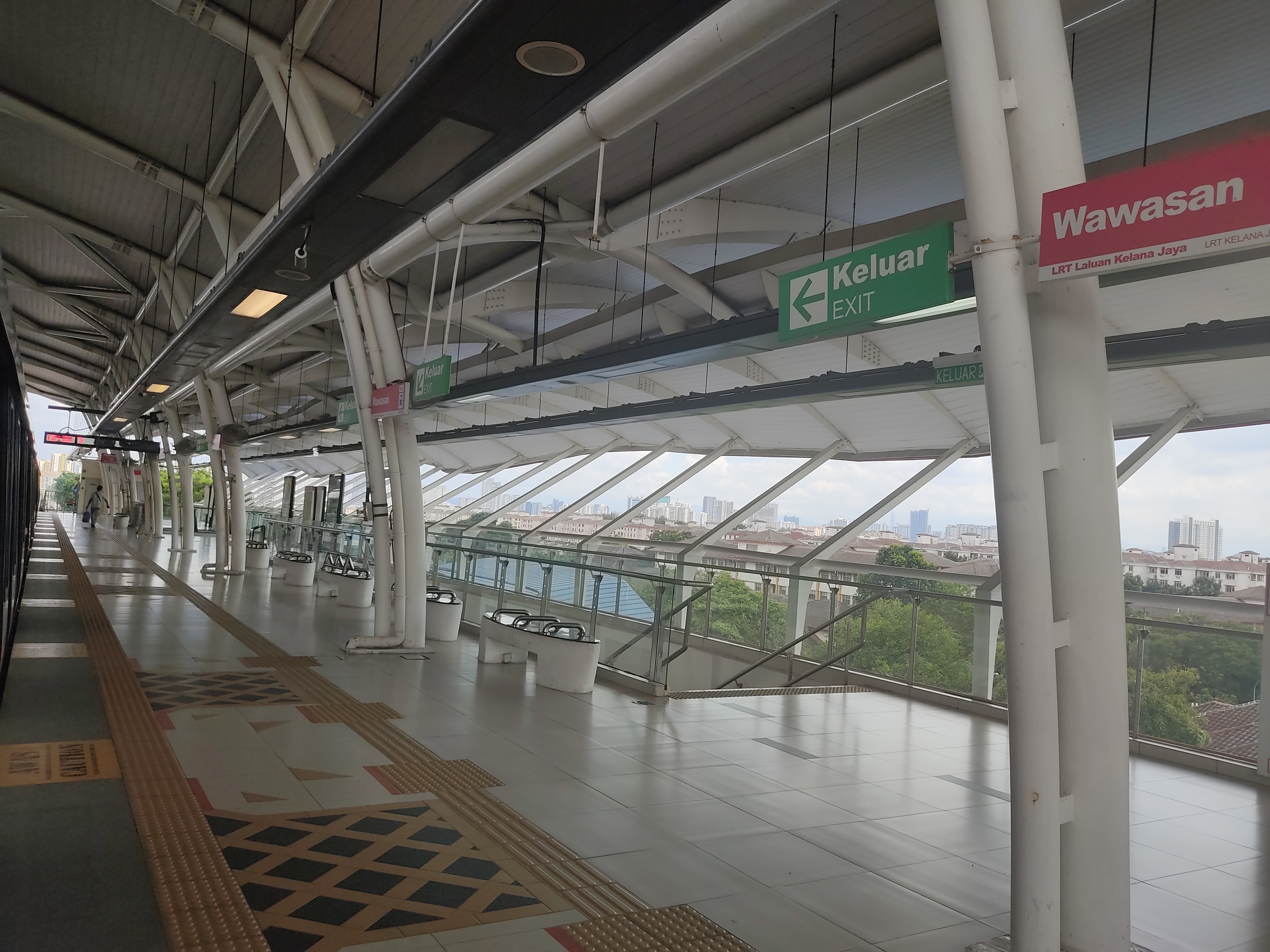
- View of Platform 2 (Putra Heights-bound) of the station

General information
- Other names: Malay: واوسن (Jawi); Chinese: 宏愿; Tamil: வாவாசான்
- Location: Persiaran Kewajipan, USJ 14, UEP Subang Jaya, 47630 Subang Jaya; Selangor; Malaysia
- System: Rapid KL
- Owner: Prasarana Malaysia
- Operator: Rapid Rail
- Line: 5 Kelana Jaya Line
- Platforms: 2 side platforms
- Tracks: 2

Construction
- Structure type: Elevated
- Parking: Not available

Other information
- Station code: KJ33

History
- Opened: 30 June 2016; 10 years ago

Services
| Preceding station | | Following station |
|---|---|---|
| Taipan towards Gombak | Kelana Jaya Line | USJ 21 towards Putra Heights |
Location

Wawasan LRT station is a light rapid transit (LRT) station in the USJ 14 neighbourhood of UEP Subang Jaya, Subang Jaya, Selangor, Malaysia. This station is located near the Wawasan Primary School Complex (Kompleks Sekolah Wawasan in Malay). The station's name Wawasan ('Vision' in Malay) refers to the school complex itself. The station serves the nearby USJ 13, USJ 14 and USJ 19 neighborhoods.

It is served by the LRT Kelana Jaya Line. Like most other LRT stations operating in the Klang Valley, this station is elevated.

== Bus services ==
| Route No. | Origin | Destination | Via | Connecting to |
|---|---|---|---|---|
| T777 | KJ32 Taipan | KJ33 Wawasan | Subang Business Center; Taipan Business Center; USJ 9 Persiaran Tujuan; KJ33 Wawasan; The 19 USJ Mall; Al-Tammimi International Islamic School; Subang Perdana Goodyear Court 10; Subang Perdana Goodyear Court 7 SMK USJ 8 Subang Perdana Goodyear Court 3 | Terminus |

== Around the station ==
- Kompleks Sekolah Wawasan
  - SK Dato' Onn Jaafar
  - SJK (C) Tun Tan Cheng Lock (敦陈祯禄华小)
  - SJK (T) Tun Sambanthan
- The 19 USJ City Mall
- USJ 13, 14 & 19
- Petronas USJ 14
- Subang Perdana Goodyear Court 8, 9 & 10
