= Taipan LRT station =

Light rapid transit station in Subang Jaya, Selangor, Malaysia

KJ32 Taipan
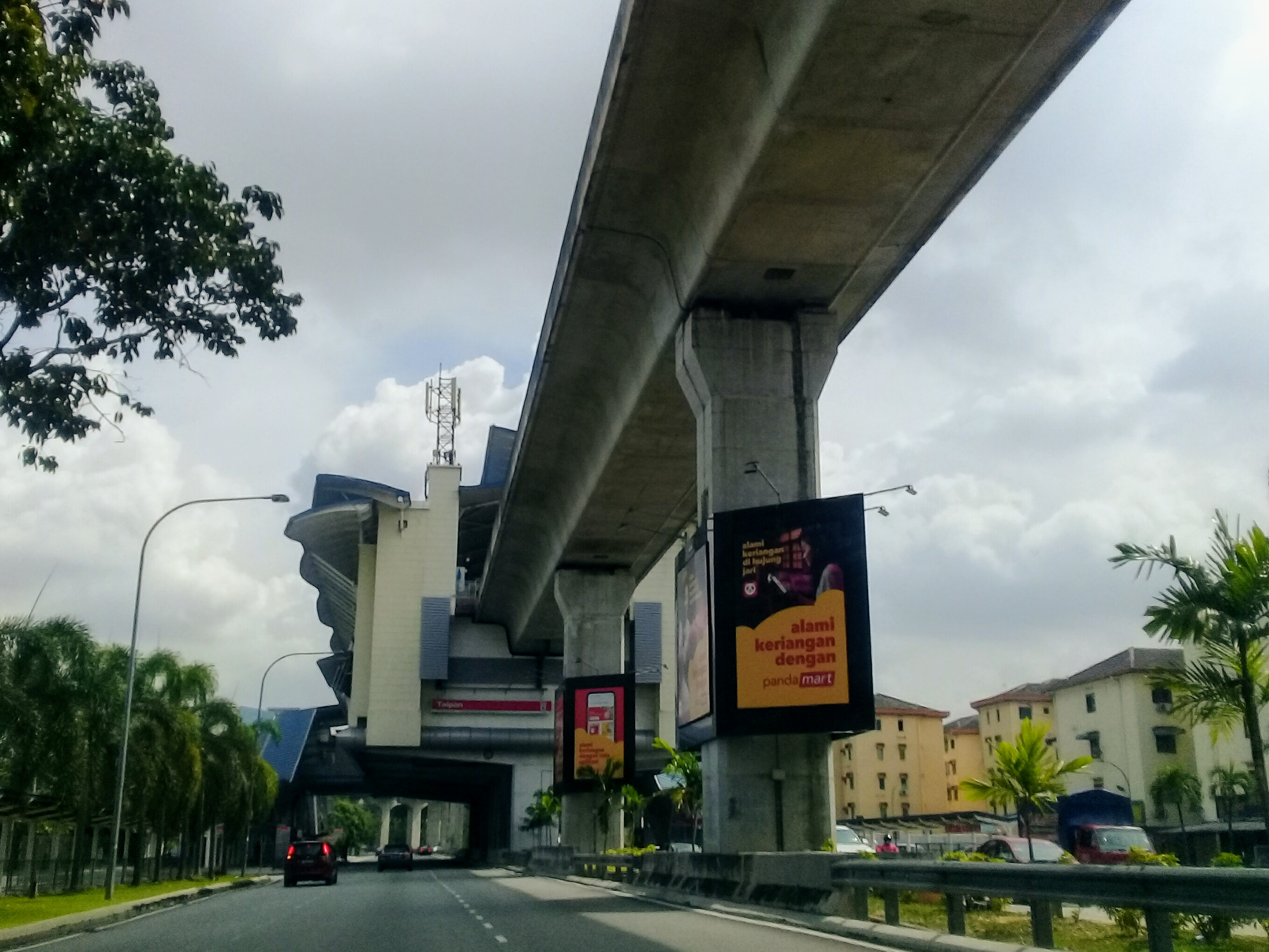
- Exterior view of the station from Persiaran Kewajipan

General information
- Other names: Malay: تاءيڤن (Jawi); Chinese: 大班; Tamil: தைப்பான்
- Location: Persiaran Kewajipan, USJ 6, UEP Subang Jaya, 47610 Subang Jaya; Selangor; Malaysia
- System: Rapid KL
- Owner: Prasarana Malaysia
- Operator: Rapid Rail
- Line: 5 Kelana Jaya Line
- Platforms: 2 side platforms
- Tracks: 2

Construction
- Structure type: Elevated
- Parking: Not available

Other information
- Station code: KJ32

History
- Opened: 30 June 2016; 10 years ago

Services
Preceding station		Following station
USJ 7 towards Gombak	Kelana Jaya Line	Wawasan towards Putra Heights
Location

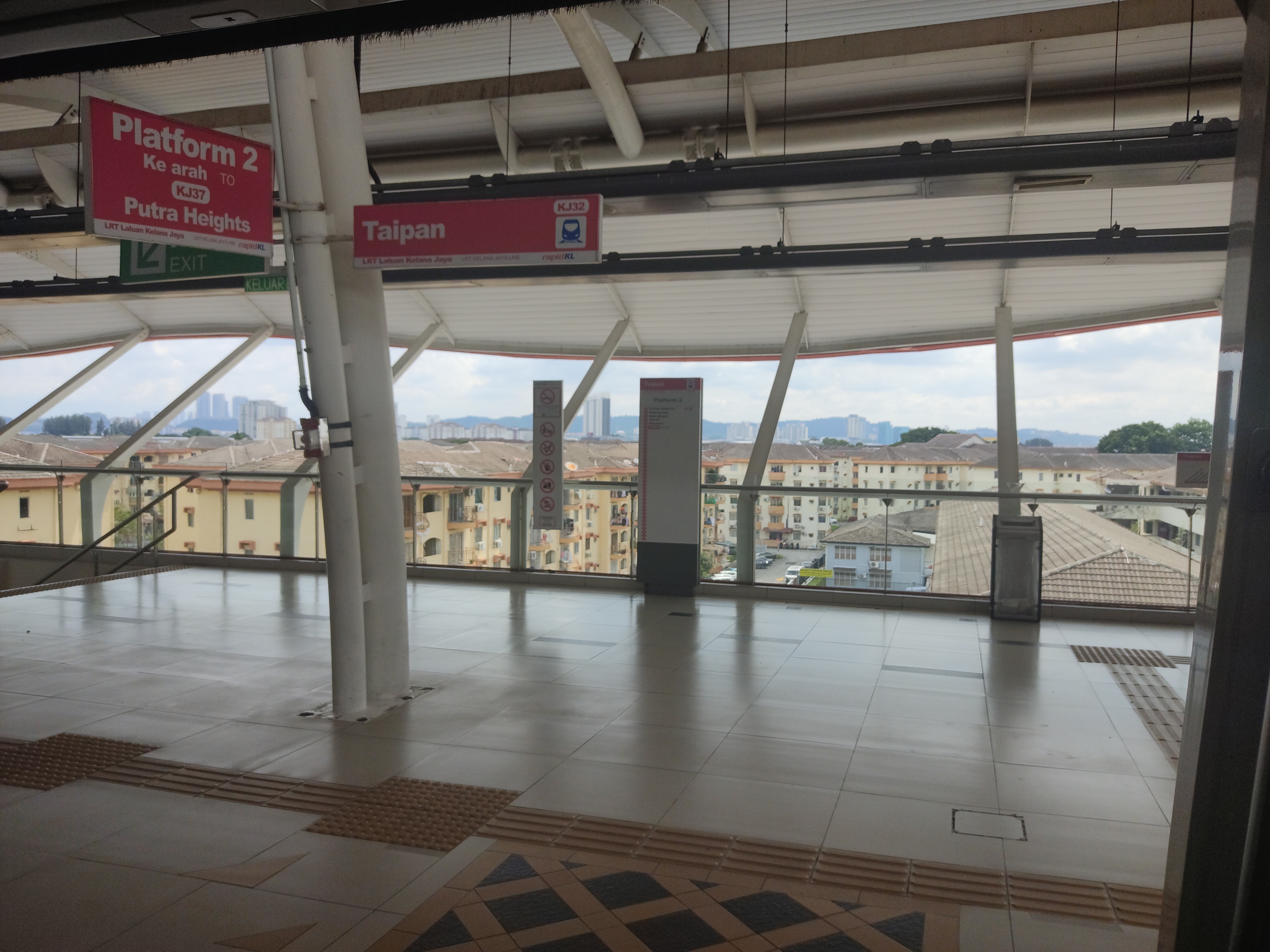
View of Platform 2 (Putra Heights-bound) of the station

Taipan LRT station is a light rapid transit (LRT) station over the major road of Persiaran Kewajipan, sandwiched between the neighbourhoods of USJ 6 and USJ 8 in UEP Subang Jaya, Subang Jaya, Selangor, Malaysia. The station serves the nearby USJ 6, USJ 8, and USJ 10 (Taipan) neighbourhoods.

The station is served by the LRT Kelana Jaya Line. Like most other LRT stations operating in the Klang Valley, this station is elevated.

== Bus services ==
=== Feeder buses ===
Route No.	Origin	Destination	Via
T776	KJ31 SB7 USJ 7	Subang Mewah, USJ 1	KJ32 Taipan; USJ 8 Police Station; Masjid Al-Falah USJ 9 Jalan Mulia (USJ 14); Subang Perdana Goodyear Court 6, 7, 8, 9 & 10; Angsana Apartment; Masjid Al-Irsyad, USJ 1 SJK (C) Chee Wen; Taman Subang Mewah; Mydin Hypermarket
T777	KJ32 Taipan	KJ33 Wawasan	Subang Business Center; Taipan Business Center; USJ 9 Persiaran Tujuan; KJ33 Wawasan; The 19 USJ Mall; Al-Tammimi International Islamic School; Subang Perdana Goodyear Court 10; Subang Perdana Goodyear Court 7 SMK USJ 8 Subang Perdana Goodyear Court 3

=== Other buses ===
Route No.	Origin	Destination	Via
770	KJ14 KG16 Pasar Seni	USJ 1, Subang Mewah	Jalan Tun Tan Cheng Lock; Jalan Tun Sambanthan (KL Sentral); Jalan Syed Putra (Mid Valley); Federal Highway; Damansara-Puchong Expressway (Kampung Lindungan); Pantai Baharu Expressway (Sunway Pyramid); Persiaran Kewajipan; Summit USJ; KJ31 SB7 USJ 7 KJ32 Taipan; Subang Perdana Goodyear Court 3, 4 & 5 Subang Business Center; USJ 9 Persiaran Tujuan; Jalan Mulia (USJ 14); Subang Perdana Goodyear Court 6, 7, 8, 9 & 10; Angsana Apartment; Masjid Al-Irsyad, USJ 1 SJK (C) Chee Wen
BET3	KJ14 KG16 Pasar Seni	USJ 1, Subang Mewah	Jalan Tun Tan Cheng Lock; Jalan Tun Sambanthan (KL Sentral); Jalan Bangsar; Pantai Baharu Expressway (Sunway Pyramid); Persiaran Kewajipan; Summit USJ; KJ31 SB7 USJ 7 KJ32 Taipan; Subang Perdana Goodyear Court 3, 4 & 5 USJ 8 Police Station; Persiaran Mulia; Persiaran Subang Indah; Angsana Apartment; Masjid Al-Irsyad, USJ 1 SJK (C) Chee Wen
SJ01	KJ28 KS02 KD09 Subang Jaya	KJ31 SB7 USJ 7	

== Around the station ==
- Taipan Business Centre
- USJ 8 Police Station
- IPD Subang Jaya
- Subang Perdana Goodyear Court 3, 4 & 5
- USJ 6, 7, 8, 9 & 10
- Subang Business Center
- Masjid Al-Fallah
