= USJ 21 LRT station =

Light rapid transit station in Subang Jaya, Selangor, Malaysia

KJ34 USJ 21
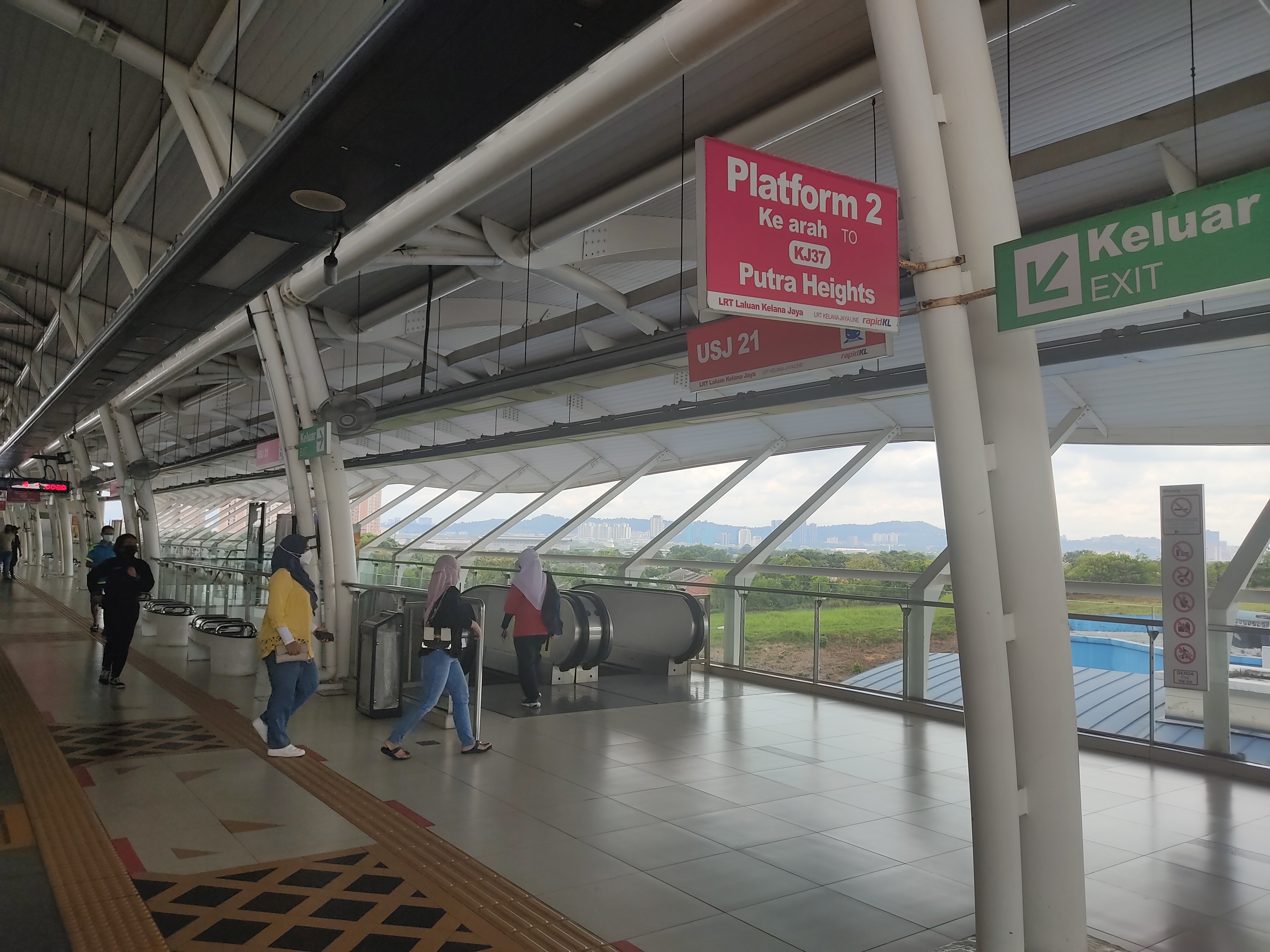
- View of Platform 2 (Putra Heights-bound) of the station

General information
- Other names: Malay: يو.ايس.جيه. 21 (Jawi); Tamil: யூஎஸ்ஜே 21
- Location: Persiaran Kewajipan, USJ 21, UEP Subang Jaya, 47630 Subang Jaya; Selangor; Malaysia
- Coordinates: 3°01′48″N 101°34′56″E
- System: Rapid KL
- Owner: Prasarana Malaysia
- Operator: Rapid Rail
- Line: 5 Kelana Jaya Line
- Platforms: 2 side platforms
- Tracks: 2

Construction
- Structure type: Elevated
- Parking: Available with payment, 694 total parking bays

Other information
- Station code: KJ34

History
- Opened: 30 June 2016; 10 years ago

Services
Preceding station		Following station
Wawasan towards Gombak	Kelana Jaya Line	Alam Megah towards Putra Heights
Location

USJ 21 LRT station is a light rapid transit (LRT) station in USJ 21 of UEP Subang Jaya, Subang Jaya, Selangor, Malaysia. The station is located near the Main Place Mall. The station serves the nearby neighbourhoods of USJ 17, USJ 18 and USJ 20. It is served by the LRT Kelana Jaya Line. Like most other LRT stations operating in the Klang Valley, this station is elevated.

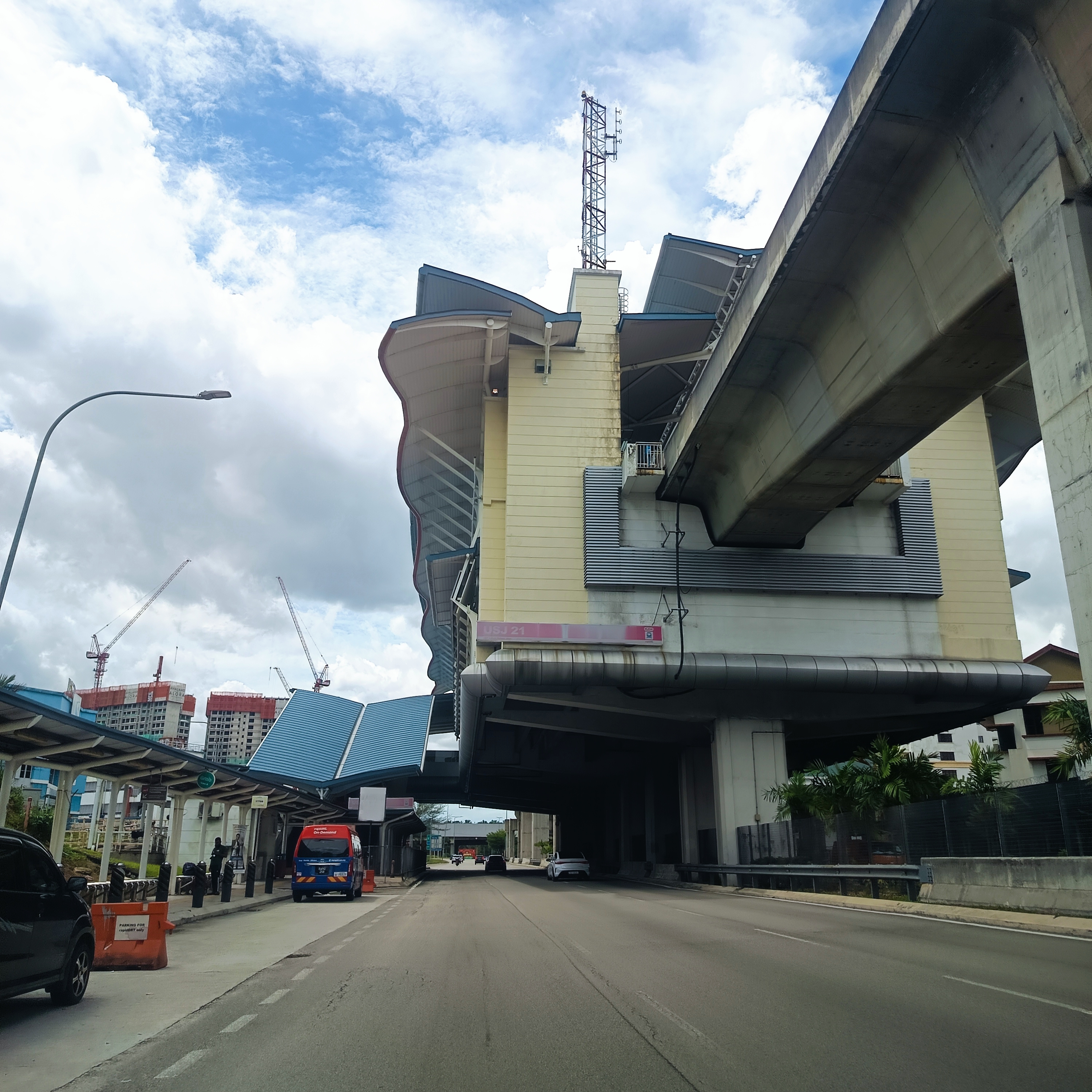
Outside of the LRT station

== Bus services ==
Route No.	Origin	Destination	Via
T778	KJ34 USJ 21	One City, USJ 23	USJ 20; USJ 22; Main Place Mall; SMK USJ 23
