= UEP Subang Jaya =

Township in Petaling, Selangor, Malaysia

- Township
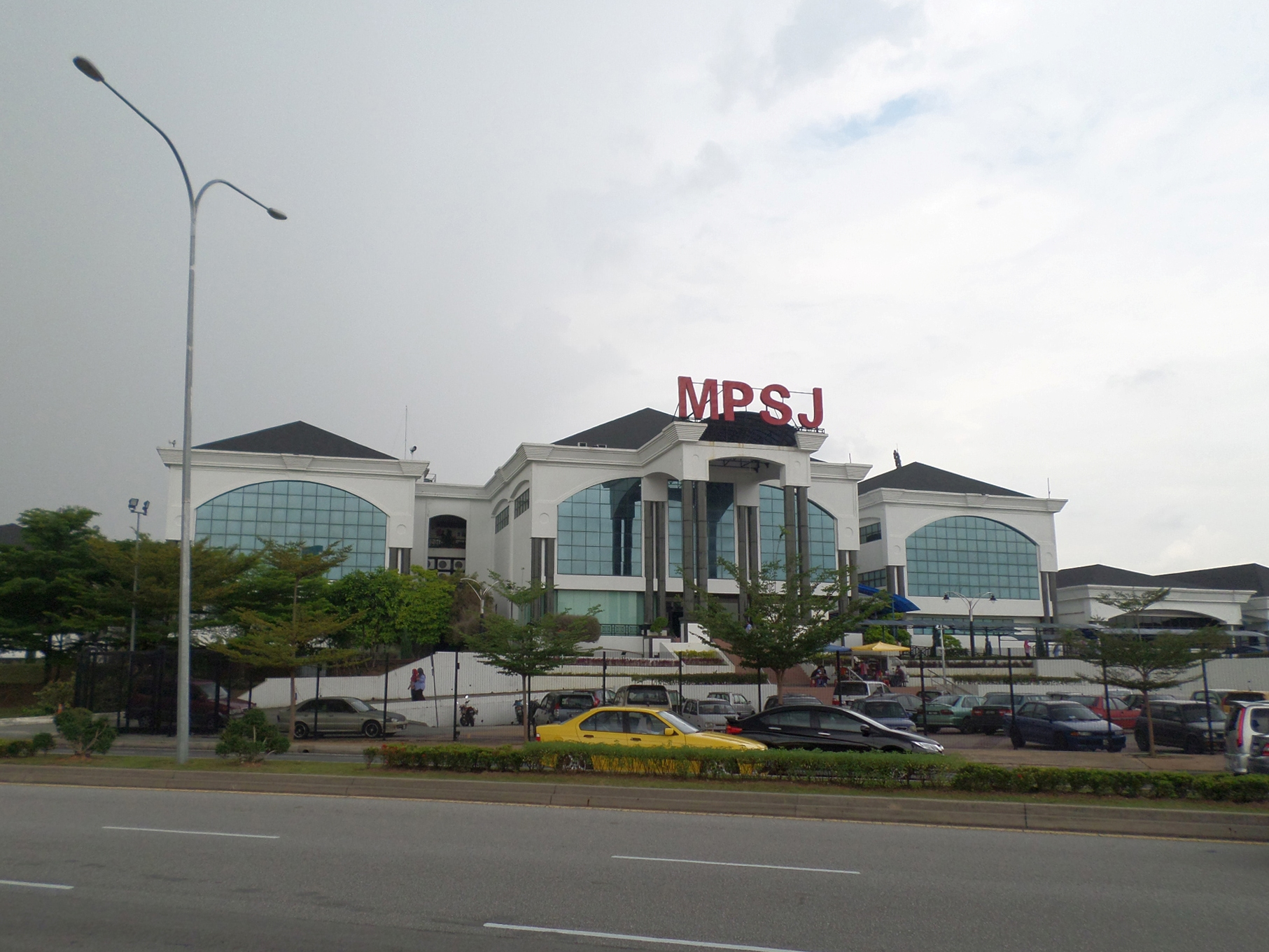
- MBSJ Office in USJ 5
- Nickname: USJ
- Location in Peninsular Malaysia
- Coordinates: 3°3′52″N 101°35′37″E
- Country: Malaysia
- State: Selangor
- District: Petaling

Government
  - Administered by: Subang Jaya City Council
- Time zone: UTC+8 (MST)
- Postcode: 47600, 47610, 47620, 47630
- Area codes: +603-56, +603-80
- Website: http://www.mbsj.gov.my/

UEP Subang Jaya (commonly called "USJ" for United Estates Projects Bhd. Subang Jaya) is a major affluent township located in Subang Jaya, Selangor, Malaysia. It is located within the Mukim (sub-district) of Damansara in the district of Petaling.

== History ==
UEP Subang Jaya was first proposed in 1984 as "Seafield Jaya" and was supposed to be a joint venture with Consolidated Plantations before it was transferred to UEP in April 1985. By 1988 it would use its current name with the UEP standing for its developer, United Estates Projects, a property business owned by Sime Darby. The township, acting as an extension to Subang Jaya, would be developed over 10 to 11 phases within 10 years and would have a population of about 120,000. With 25,000 units of "flats, shops and residential houses" spanning over 726 hectares, it aims at the middle class and emphasises on community building.

Awards for the earthworks contract were given in April 1988 and construction of the first phase began in August. UEP would build 2,500 units in the first year. 200 units would be built in each phase. The first houses were sold in June.

USJ consists of USJ1 to USJ27.

In the late 1990s, many new developments were growing rapidly in USJ. However, due to the economic crisis in 1997, it resulted in three large abandoned high-rise projects. By 2010, these abandoned projects had been revived and completed construction. In recent years, there were plenty of mixed commercial developments around the township to cater to the affluent population.

Almost 80% of USJ was developed by Sime UEP. USJ has been under the jurisdiction of the Subang Jaya City Council since 1997. The first batch of residential communities was ready in the early 1990s. Since then, USJ has expanded into 27 sections (from USJ 1 to USJ 27) along with newer upscale areas like USJ Heights, Subang Heights and Tropicana Metropark. The residential neighborhoods of the USJ township mainly consist of landed houses such as terraces, semi-detached houses and bungalows.

== Politics ==
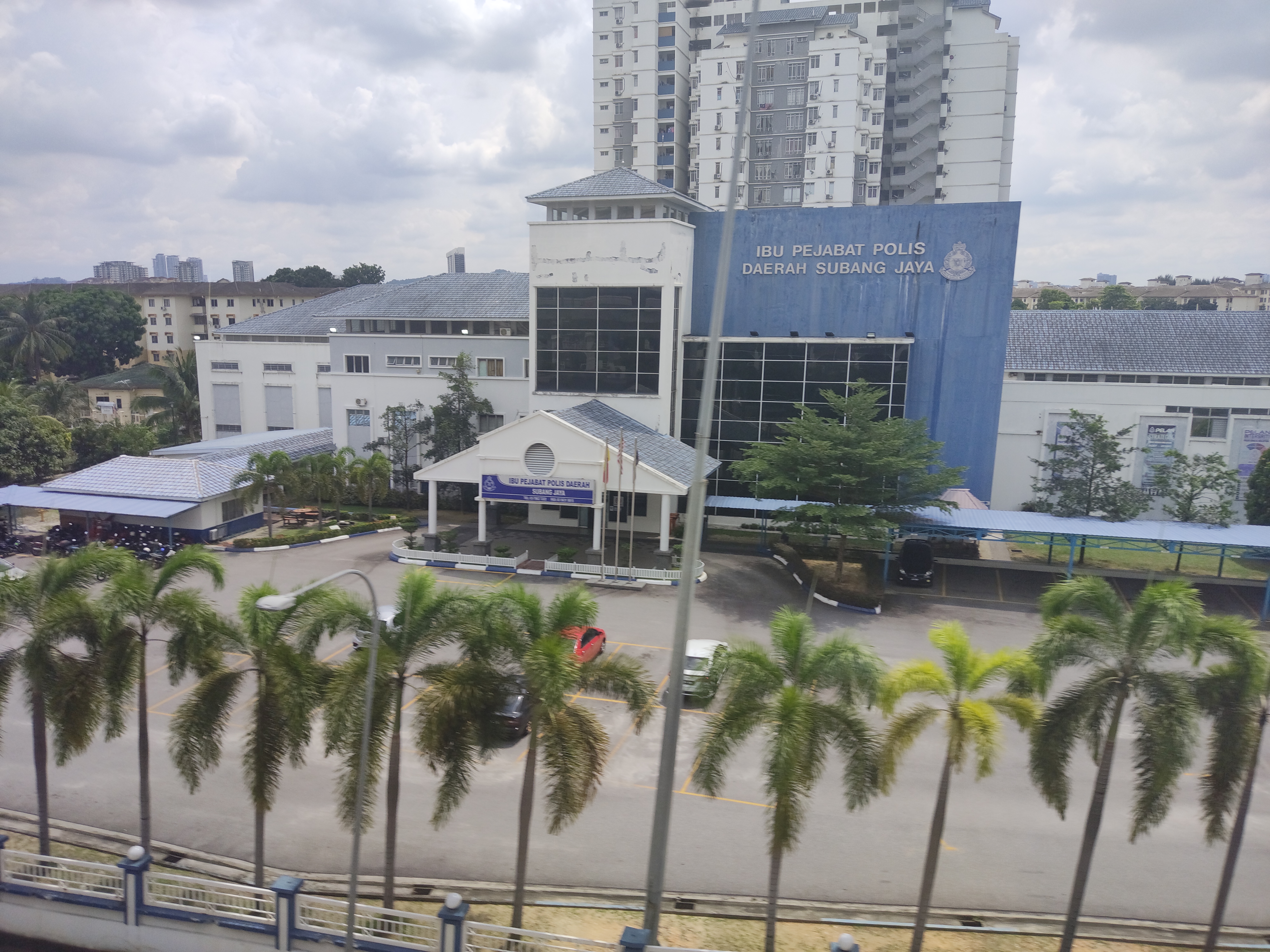
Subang Jaya police headquarters within USJ

USJ is covered under N31 Subang Jaya (which includes SS12-19, USJ 1-22 and PJS 7, 9, 11) in the Selangor State Assembly. The State Assemblyman (Ahli Dewan Undangan Negeri, ADUN) is Democratic Action Party (DAP)'s Michell Ng who took over the seat from Democratic Action Party Hannah Yeoh since 9 May 2018.

In Parliament, USJ is under the P104 Subang constituency. The current Member of Parliament (MP) is Wong Chen of Parti Keadilan Rakyat (PKR) who replaced Loh Gwo Burne (which previously P104 Subang are known as P104 Kelana Jaya until 2018) in 2013 and Tan Seong Lim of Barisan Nasional. Loh Seng Kok of BN-MCA was MP from 2004 to 2013.

== Commerce ==
USJ has grown rapidly in recent years but has paid a price in terms of traffic congestions and a shortage of parking spaces. The main commercial hubs in USJ are USJ Taipan (a.k.a. USJ 10) and Subang Business Centre USJ 9 respectively. USJ Taipan is the township's central business area, which is a prominent commercial area in the Klang Valley. Almost all major banks have an office branch in the area. There are two high-rise office buildings in USJ Taipan which are Wisma TNB and Wisma Conlay.

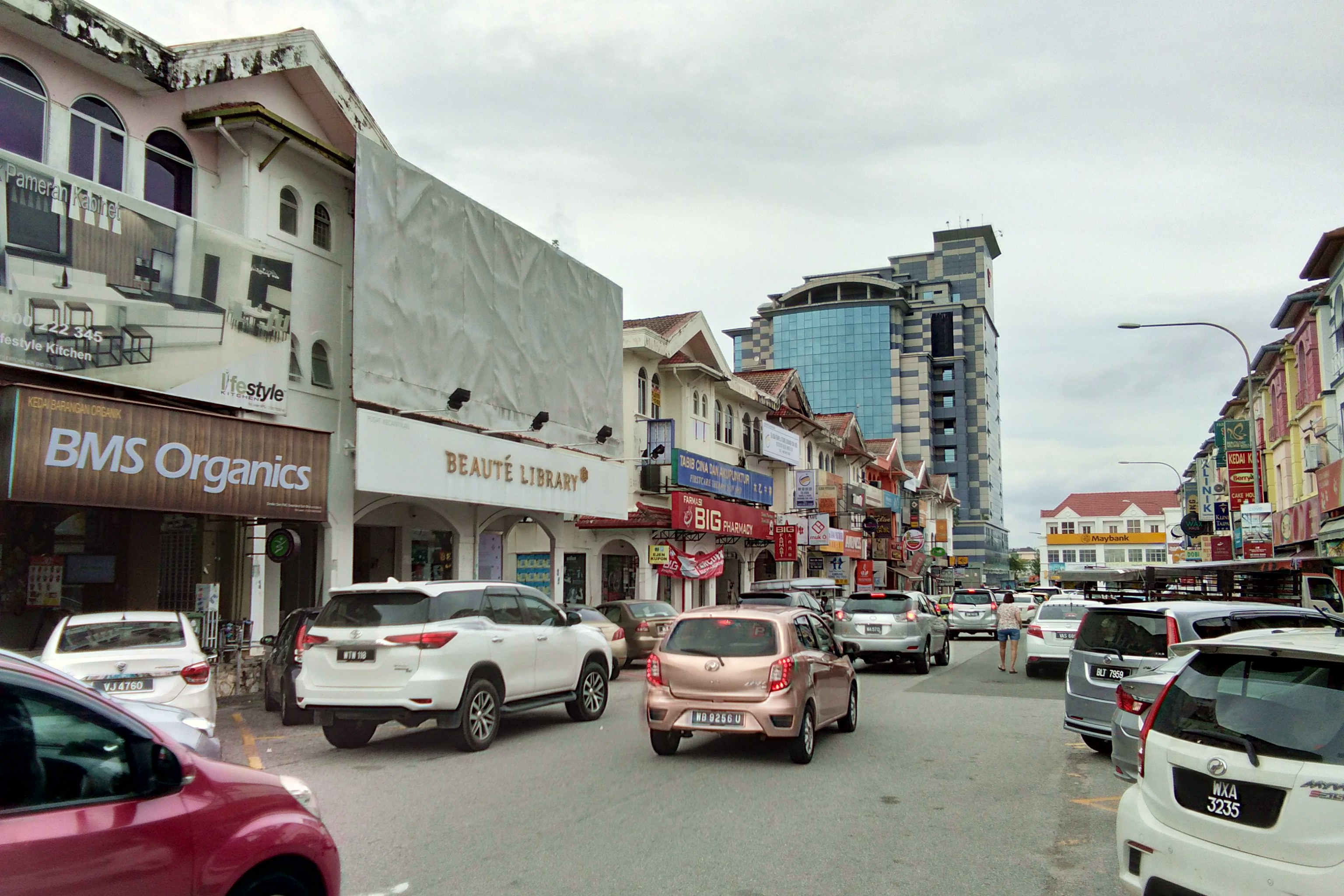
Taipan Business Centre

There is a wide variety of shopping malls situated within the township. In USJ 1, there are malls such as Da Men, The Summit and hypermarkets, Giant and Mydin. Da Men and The Summit are two prominent landmarks of the township. In USJ 21, there is a shopping mall called The Main Place. It consists of a high-rise serviced residence above the shopping mall. Opposite of The Main Place is an integrated development known as One City at USJ 25. It is a mixed commercial development consisting of office suites, a shopping mall, a cinema, a hotel, and a high-rise serviced residence. For alternate shopping options, there are Empire Subang, Subang Parade, Sunway Pyramid, SS15 Courtyard, Paradigm Mall, Citta Mall, Oasis Ara Damansara, IOI Mall Puchong, and Aeon Shah Alam located within a 5 km radius.

The oldest and most well-known hotel in USJ is the 3-star Summit Hotel adjoining The Summit shopping mall, which consists of 332 guest rooms. On the southern side of the township in One City, there is a 4-star business class hotel, eCity Hotel, which consists of 243 guest rooms. For budget hotels, there are plenty of other alternatives within the township. Alternatively, there are many other hotels located in adjacent Subang Jaya.

== Industrial Area ==
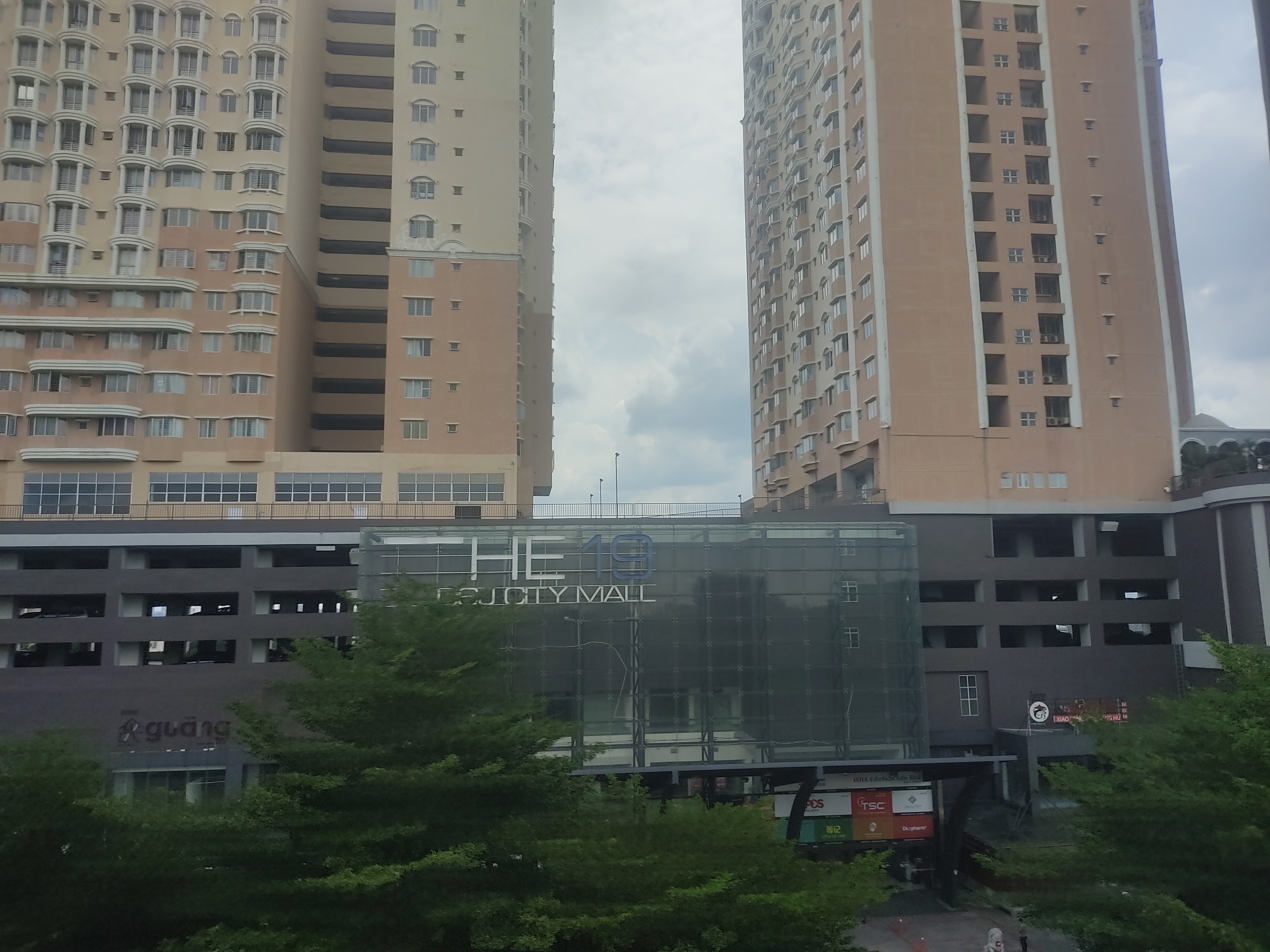
The 19 USJ City Mall in 2021

The industrial areas are located in USJ 1 through USJ 8 and USJ 19. Some of these industrial areas include Ultramine and Sungai Penaga Industrial Park, Subang Industrial Park, Subang Hi-Tech Industrial Park and Sime UEP Industrial Park, involving in light and heavy industry.

Lotus Cars and the Malaysian headquarters of PROTON (Centre of Excellence), and many other major international companies are located in UEP Industrial Park. The Proton Headquarters in USJ is connected to its Shah Alam manufacturing plant and test track through a private tunnel.

In 1999, Faber-Castell established its Malaysia headquarters in UEP Industrial Park. The World's Longest Pencil, Castell 9000, is located here.

== Education ==
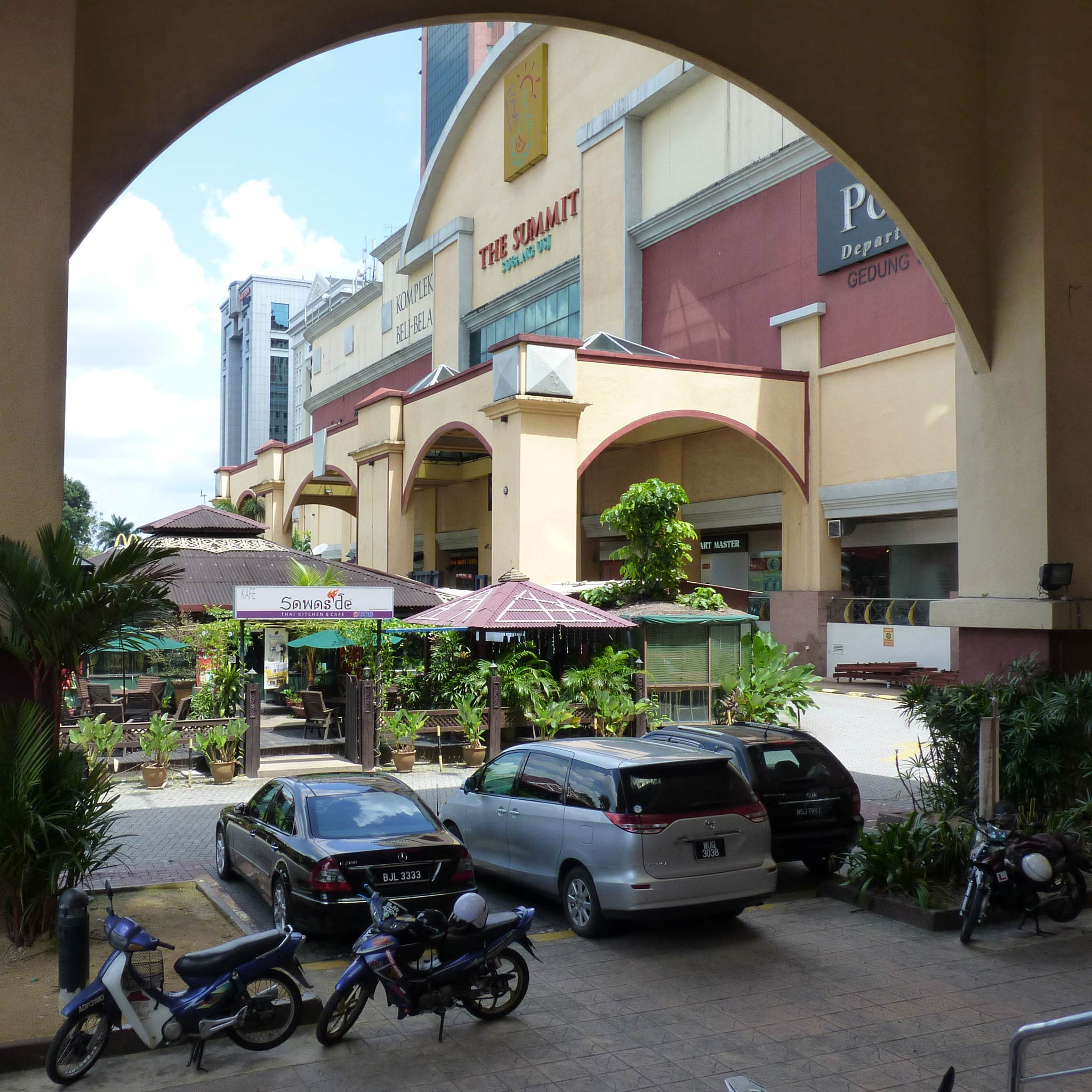
The Summit Shopping Mall in USJ 1

USJ is home to many local, private and international schools. Education is available from primary right up to the tertiary level. Sekolah Wawasan school located in USJ was opened in 2002 with commitments as a "Vision" government school. It is one of the only 3 "Vision" schools in Malaysia.

=== Primary ===
- At-Tamimi Islamic International School
- Fairview International School
- GEMS International School
- Sri Kuala Lumpur
- Sekolah Wawasan USJ 15
- Sekolah Kebangsaan Dato Onn Jaafar
- Sekolah Jenis Kebangsaan (Cina) Tun Tan Cheng Lock
- Sekolah Jenis Kebangsaan (Cina) Chee Wen
- Sekolah Jenis Kebangsaan (Tamil) Tun Sambathan
- Sekolah Kebangsaan Seafield 3
- Sekolah Kebangsaan USJ 12
- Sekolah Kebangsaan Seafield (USJ 6)
- Sekolah Kebangsaan USJ 2
- Sekolah Kebangsaan USJ 20
- Sekolah Kebangsaan Seri Selangor USJ 4
- Sekolah SJK (C) Lick Hung SS19
- Sunway International School
- UCSI International School

=== Secondary ===
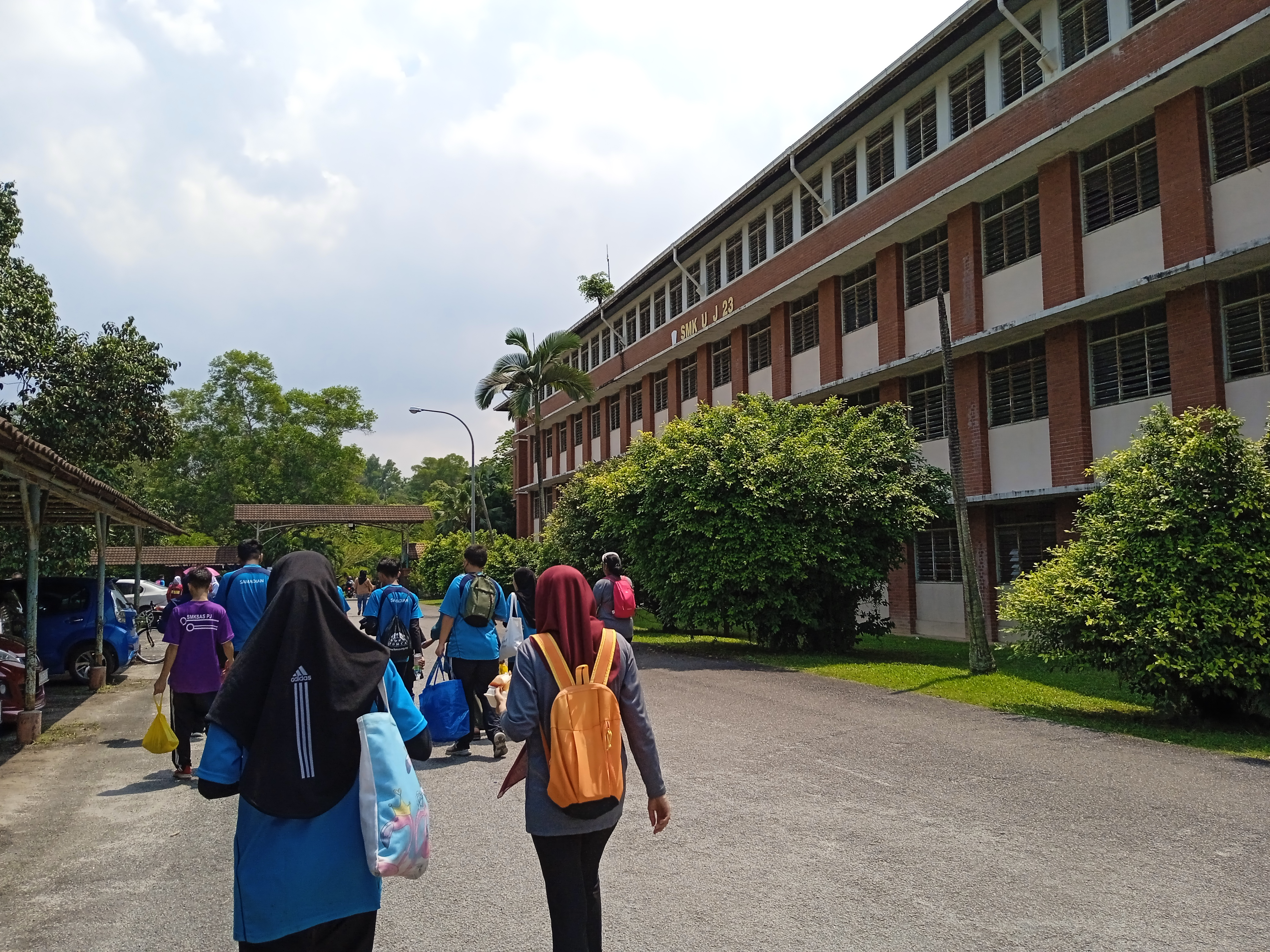
SMK USJ 23

- Fairview International School (Sime UEP Industrial Park)
- GEMS International School
- Sekolah Menengah Kebangsaan Seafield (USJ 2)
- Sekolah Menengah Kebangsaan USJ 8
- Sekolah Menengah Kebangsaan USJ 12
- Sekolah Menengah Kebangsaan USJ 13
- Sekolah Menengah Kebangsaan USJ 23
- Sekolah Menengah Kebangsaan USJ 4
- Sekolah Agama Menengah Bestari USJ 5
- Sirius Scholar Study Skills (USJ Sentral)
- Sunway International School
- Sri Kuala Lumpur
- UCSI International School

=== Tertiary ===
- SEGi University College
- Cilantro Culinary Academy
- Sunway University
- Sunway College
- Monash University Malaysia
- INTI International College
- Taylor's College
- Taylor's Lakeside University
- The One Academy
- Kolej CQ-TEC
- Kasturi International College
- Imperia College
- Alfa College

== Healthcare ==
USJ is a township well-served with medical facilities. There are health clinics sprawling within various commercial and residential areas.

The main private hospitals serving the township are Sime Darby Medical Centre Subang Jaya in SS12 and Sunway Medical Centre in Bandar Sunway where there are world-class medical facilities. Alternatively, there is a smaller medical centre at the Subang Business Centre USJ 9, namely the QHC Medical Centre.

== Recreation ==
The Subang Jaya Municipal Council Sports Complex in USJ 5 has a football turf and an athletic running track which are compliant to international standards, grandstands to accommodate 800 spectators and floodlights for night games. In every residential neighborhood, there are landscaped parks, recreational fields, basketball courts, jogging tracks and children's playgrounds.

== Accessibility ==
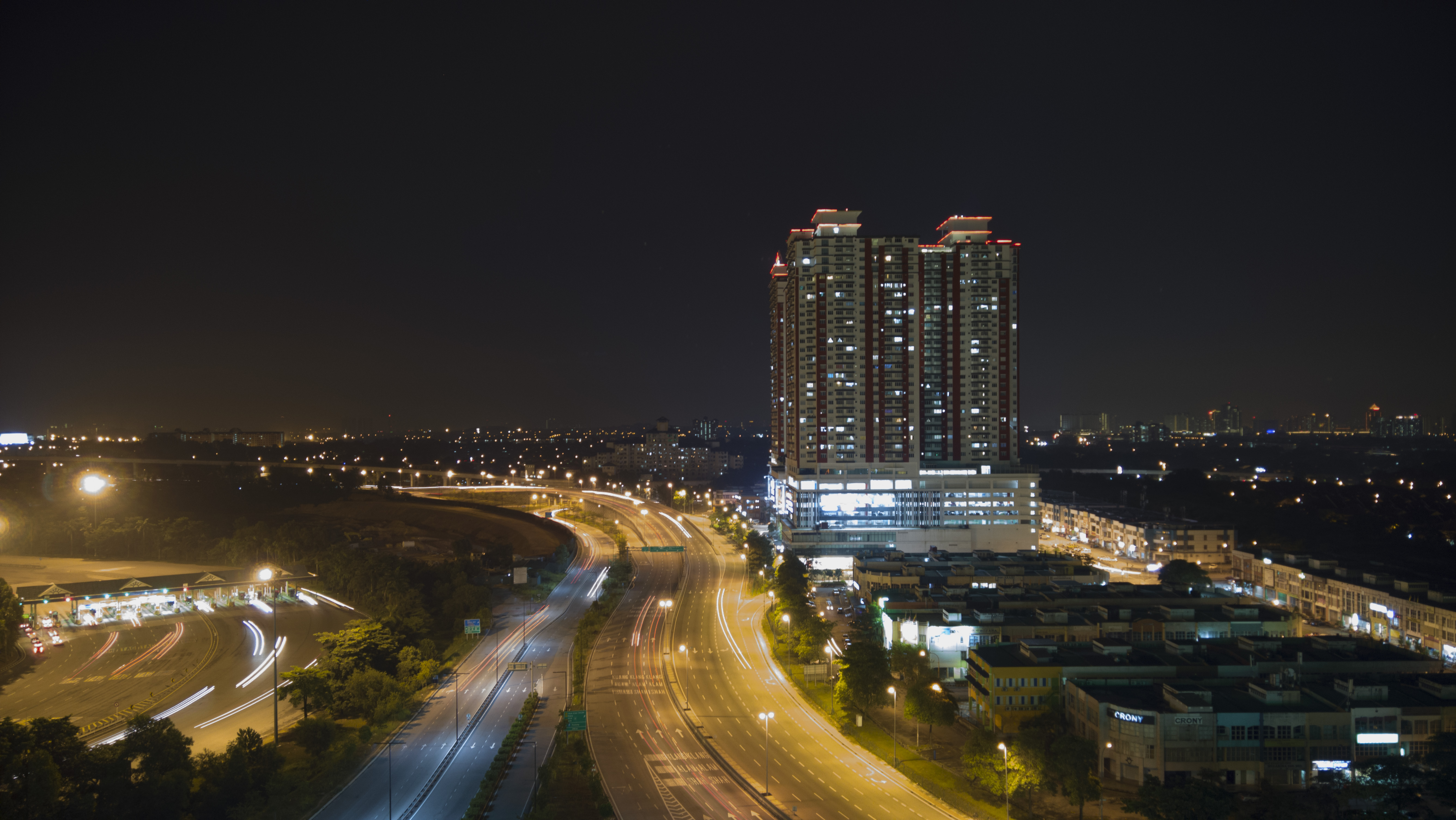
Lebuhraya Damansara-Puchong near One City, USJ 25

The township of USJ is strategically connected to many major highways such as Federal Highway, New Klang Valley Expressway (NKVE), North–South Expressway Central Link (ELITE), Shah Alam Expressway (KESAS), Damansara–Puchong Expressway (LDP) and New Pantai Expressway (NPE). It is only a mere 20 minutes drive from USJ to the Kuala Lumpur city centre by using the New Pantai Expressway (NPE) through SMART Tunnel.

The two major roads serving the township are Persiaran Kewajipan and Persiaran Tujuan. Most of the road systems in USJ are made of three lanes dual carriageway connecting to smaller roads. The major gridlock of traffic normally occurs at the junction between KESAS highway and Persiaran Kewajipan. However, two new U-turn ramps have been built to improve the traffic gridlock at this KESAS-Kewajipan junction.

In terms of public transportation, there are buses, taxis, elevated bus rapid transit (BRT), and public light-rail transit (LRT) trains serving around the township. RapidKL has buses plying between Subang Jaya, USJ and Putra Heights. RapidKL bus number BET3 and 770 are some of the buses that connect Kuala Lumpur to and from the township.

The BRT Sunway Line in the township provides an integrated transit service which connects between Bandar Sunway and USJ without any traffic congestion. In total, there are two main BRT stations serving the township. The USJ 7 station is an interchange to the Rapid KL's LRT Kelana Jaya Line.

=== LRT Extension Development ===
The Kelana Jaya Line extension opened on 30 June 2016 from the existing route from Kelana Jaya LRT Depot, passing through Lembah Subang (near the NZX commercial centre, another near Dana 1 commercial centre) in Kelana Jaya, to Kelana Centre Point, then to Subang Jaya station (interchange station to KTM Subang Jaya Komuter station), to SS15 LRT station, to SS18 LRT station, then connect to USJ at USJ 7 station, to Taipan LRT Station, to Wawasan LRT Station, then lastly to USJ21 LRT Station. The terminal station is located at Putra Heights LRT station, which serves as an interchange station between Sri Petaling Line and Kelana Jaya Line.
