= Taipan 28 =

Cruising sailing yacht

The Taipan 28 is a cruising sailing yacht. The 28 ft (8.5 m) GRP bermuda rigged sloop was designed and built in Pak Sha Wan, Hong Kong by Interchem Engineers Ltd.

Around 100 were built from approximately 1970-1980 starting with hull number 100. They have a full keel and a relatively short rig. Different interiors were built, with interior tables or berths to starboard and 3-4 berths. They were powered by an inboard diesel engine.

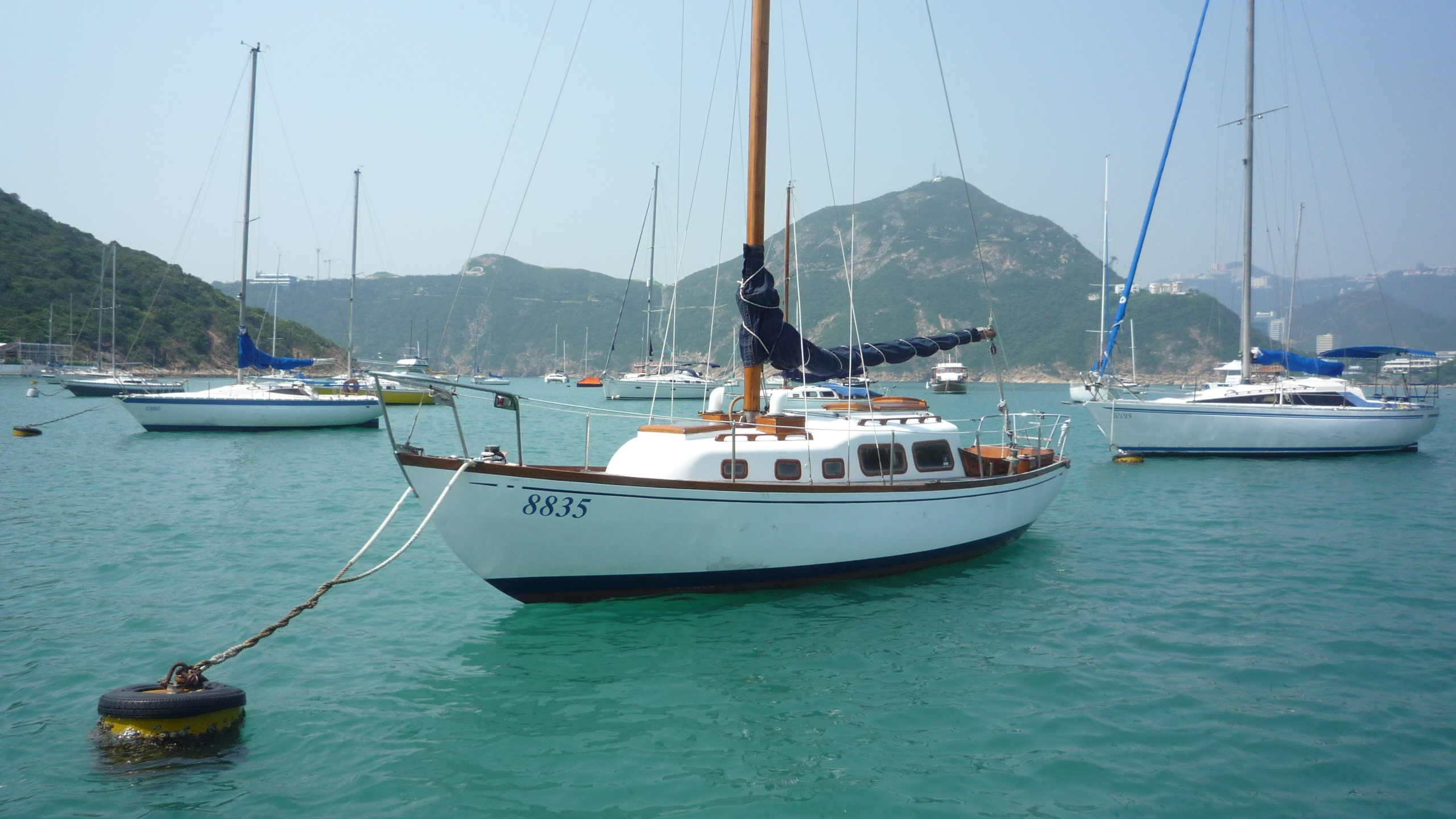
Taipan 28 moored at the RHKYC, Middle Island, Hong Kong

== Specifications ==
=== General ===
Length Overall (L.O.A): 28'0" 8.53m
Waterline Length (L.W.L): 20'9" 6.3m
Beam: 7'9" 2.36m
Draft: 4'6" 1.37m
Ballast Keel: 3,064 lb 1,389 kg

=== Displacement ===
Displacement: 7,850 lb 3,560 kg

=== Sail Area ===
Working sail area: 338 sq ft (31.4 m^{2})
With Genoa jib: 450 sq ft (42 m^{2})

=== Tank capacity ===
Fuel 9 gallon 34 litre
Water 23 gallon 87.06 litre

=== Engine ===
Almost all boats were fitted with MD1B Volvo Penta engines. Marine Diesel, 10 HP, 1 cylinder, 4 stroke, water cooled, max speed 2500 rpm, ratio 1.87:1 with 12 volt dyna starter.

== Known Vessels ==
Name	Year	Hull	Country
Taipan	1969	110	California
əkwâr`ēəs	1969	112	North Carolina
Smilin' Seagull	1970	119	British Columbia
Irish Mist	1970		California
Ming Chu	1971	121	Edinburgh, Scotland
Taikoo	1970	122	Oregon, USA
Eroica	1972		Hong Kong
Islander	1972		Brazil
Arawana	1972	127	Adelaide, Australia
Xanadu	1973	131	Hong Kong
Crescent Moon	1973	133	United Kingdom
Nomad	1974	134	Hong Kong
Titanic	1974	137	Hong Kong
OneSixOneFive (previously "Yarramoor")	1974	139	Hong Kong
Slippery Shrimp Renamed "Snow Goose II"	1976	144	Redondo Beach, California
Naiad	1977	177	Hong Kong
Mystic	1978		Hong Kong
Scrimshaw (beached and decommissioned)	1979		Hong Kong
Shao Tai Tai	1980		Hong Kong
Adagio			
Antares			
Camelot			
Daedalus			
Deben			
Don Quixote			Hong Kong
Dove			Hong Kong
Kotuku			
Patricia			
Rafiki			
Ragamuffin			Hong Kong
Silver Cloud			Hong Kong
Toni Anne			
Triton			Hong Kong
Virgen Del Mar			

== Racing ==
The Aberdeen Boat Club, Hong Kong holds an annual Classic Yacht Rally which includes a division for locally built Taipans called the Taipan Cup.

=== Taipan Cup ===
Year	Taipan Cup Winner	Best Looking
2005	Mystic	Ragamuffin
2006	Ragamuffin	Ragamuffin
2007	Naiad	Ragamuffin
2008	Ragamuffin	n/a
2009	n/a	n/a
2010	Mystic	n/a
