= Taipan Business Centre =

Commercial district in Petaling, Selangor, Malaysia

Coordinates: 3.048725°N 101.5850311°E

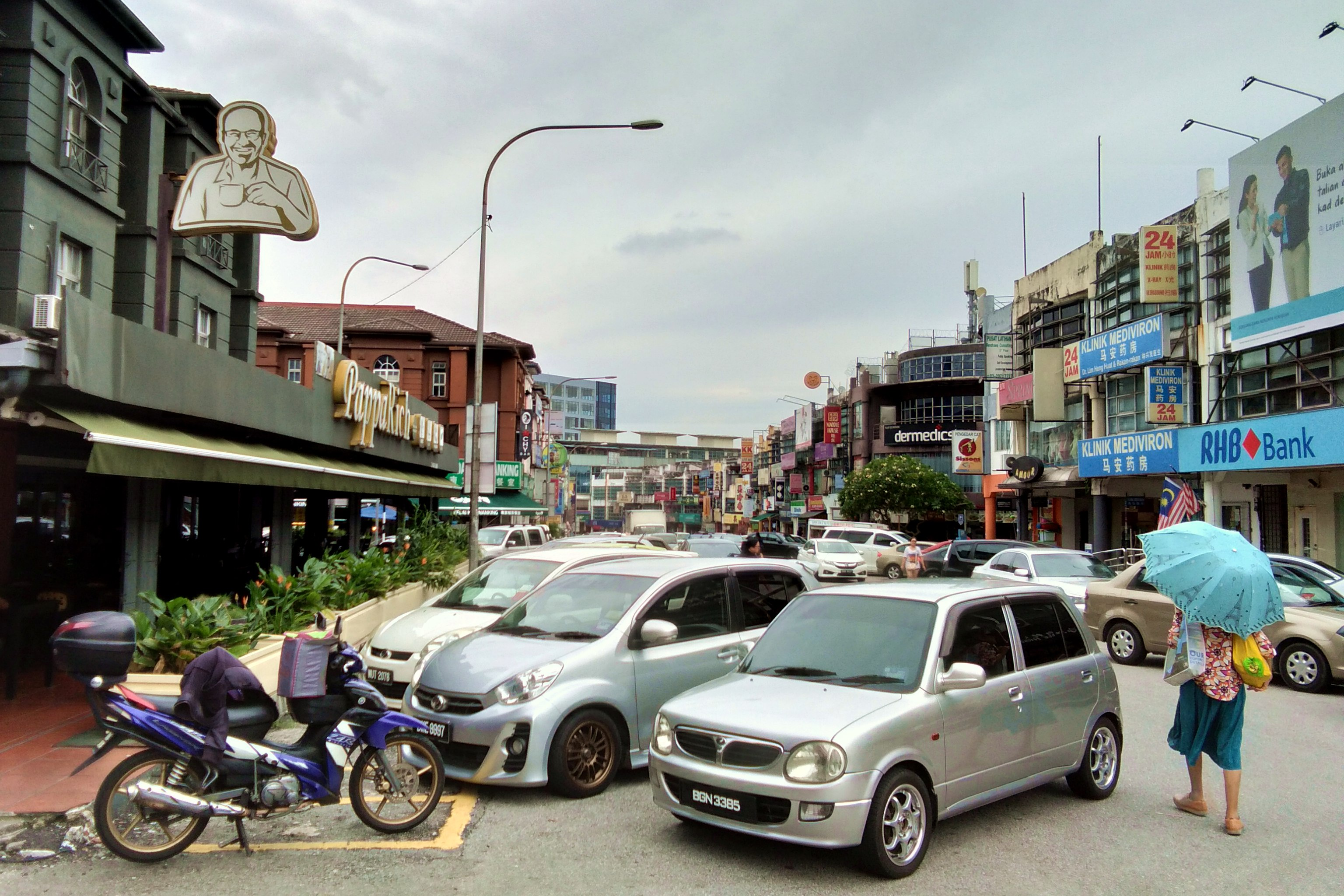
Taipan Business Centre in December 2018

Taipan Business Centre, also known as USJ 10, is a commercial district in the UEP Subang Jaya (USJ) area of Subang Jaya, Selangor, Malaysia. It is constructed in the 1990s by developer Sime UEP Sdn Bhd and is notable as the main business district in USJ.

== Geography ==
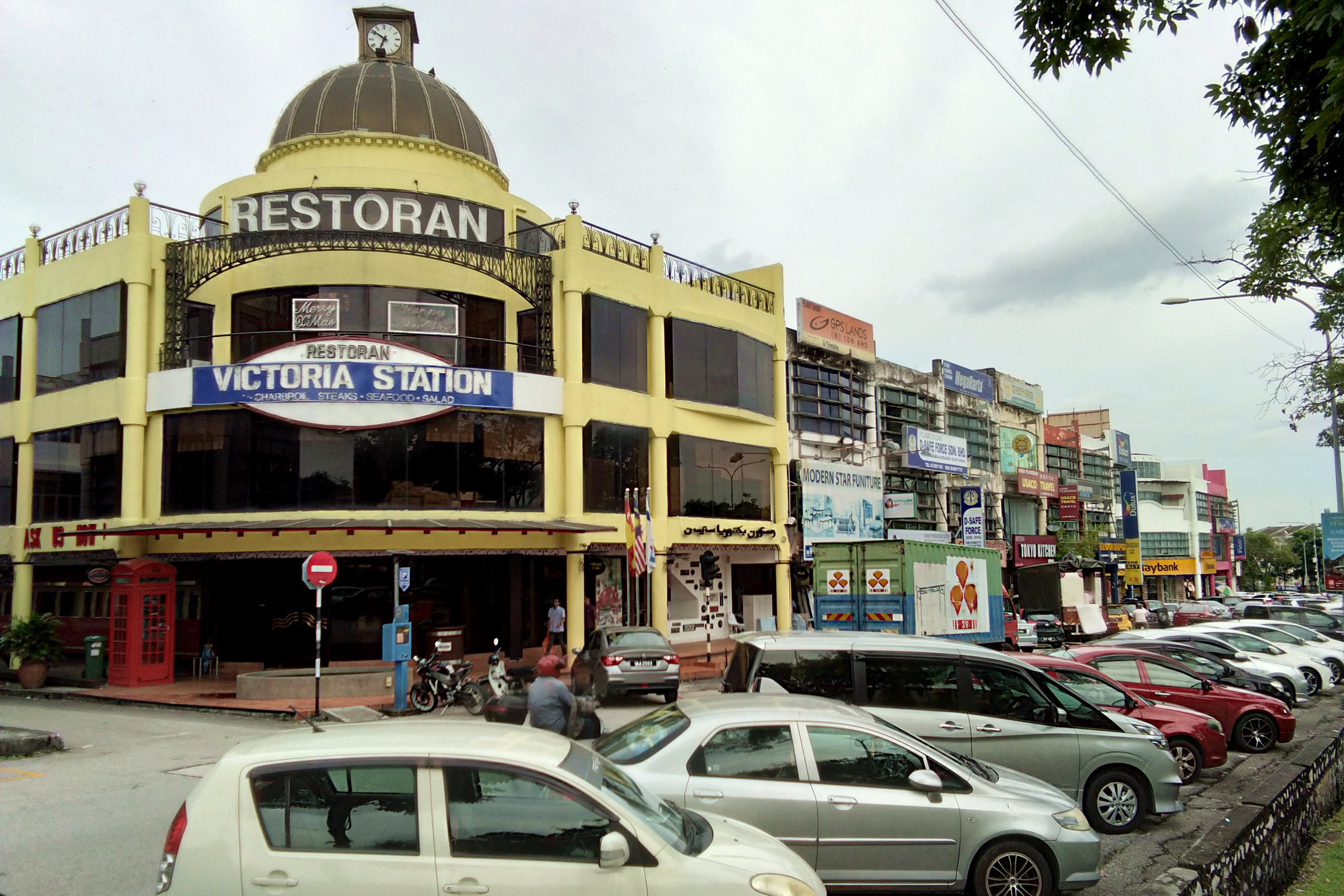
Victoria Station restaurant from Persiaran Ikhlas

Taipan Business Centre is approximately in the centre of UEP Subang Jaya (USJ), where it is named USJ 10. It is bounded by Persiaran Perpaduan to the north and east, Persiaran Bakti to the west and Persiaran Ikhlas to the south. Nearby residential areas include USJ 5 to USJ 11. The Subang Business Centre is also nearby.

The nearest station is Taipan LRT station on the Kelana Jaya line which opened in 2016.

== History ==
Taipan business centre was constructed together with the USJ townships in the 1990s by developer Sime UEP Properties Bhd, part of Sime Darby Bhd.

== Features ==
The business centre has a multi-storey carpark in the centre which is surrounded by shoplots forming a triangular shape.

== Economy and other attractions ==
Taipan business centre functions as the main business hub of the USJ neighbourhood, which is renowned for food, shopping and banking services. It also serves the large residential area where most of the development were completed in the 1990s and 2000s. It is targeted to boost further developments around the area together with adequate public transport provided. Several well-known national and multinational companies have established their headquarters nearby such as Proton, Malaysia's car brand, Lotus Cars and Faber Castell.

Nearby attractions include The Summit USJ Mall and the Majlis Perbandaran Subang Jaya (MPSJ) Mini Stadium.

== Cultural references ==
Taipan business centre is also known as the "Taipan triangle" as the shape of the area is a triangle right-angled to the southwest.

=== Criticism ===
There have been complaints on the cleanliness of back alleys in the business centre, where it is said to be filthy. Food and unwanted furniture were scattered around the back lanes.
