= IOI Puchong Jaya LRT station =

Metro station in Selangor, Malaysia

Coordinates: 3°2′53.1″N 101°37′15.2″E

SP24 IOI Puchong Jaya
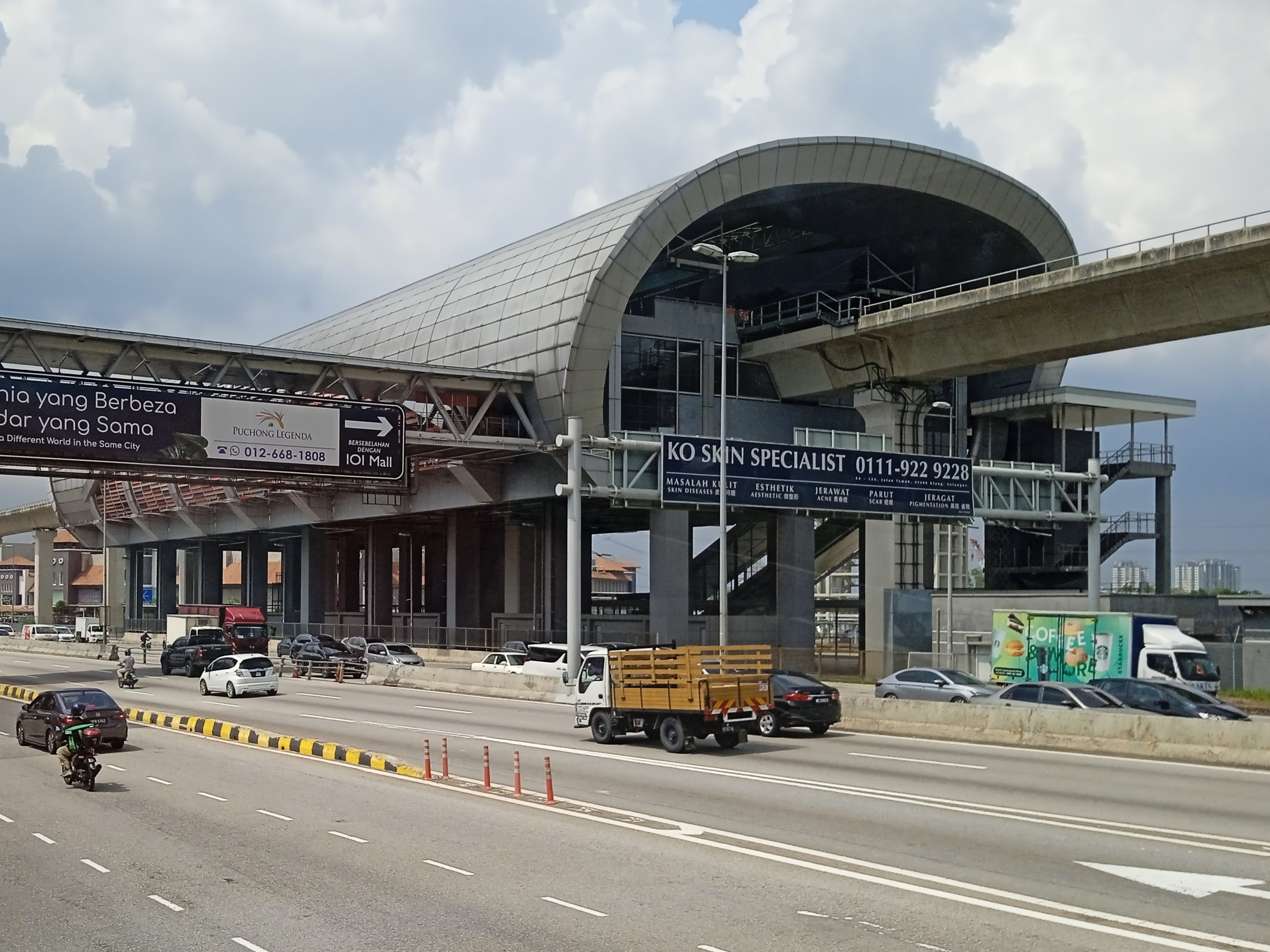
- The station as viewed from Puchong Jaya

General information
- Other names: Malay: اءي.او.اءي. ڤوچوڠ جاي (Jawi); Chinese: IOI 蒲种山庄; Tamil: ஐஓஐ பூச்சோங் ஜெயா
- Location: Northbound carriageway of the Damansara–Puchong Expressway, Bandar Puchong Jaya, 47170 Puchong; Selangor; Malaysia
- System: Rapid KL
- Owner: Prasarana Malaysia
- Operator: Rapid Rail
- Line: 4 Sri Petaling Line
- Platforms: 2 side platforms
- Tracks: 2

Construction
- Structure type: Elevated
- Parking: Available with payment. 464 total parking bays.
- Accessible: Available

Other information
- Station code: SP24

History
- Opened: 31 March 2016; 10 years ago

Services
Preceding station		Following station
Kinrara BK 5 towards Sentul Timur	Sri Petaling Line	Pusat Bandar Puchong towards Putra Heights
Location

The IOI Puchong Jaya LRT station is a light rapid transit (LRT) station at Puchong Jaya, a township in Puchong, Selangor. It is located near IOI Mall Puchong, and its name was taken from IOI Group and Bandar Puchong Jaya. Despite having IOI in its name, the station is not part of Prasarana Malaysia's station naming rights programme; the station was deliberately named as such due to its proximity to the mall.

It is served by the LRT Sri Petaling Line. Like most other LRT stations operating in the Klang Valley, this station is elevated.

== History ==
The LRT Sri Petaling Line extension project was proposed in 2006. Construction started in 2011. The project, worth RM955.84 million, was awarded to a joint venture (JV) consortium of George Kent (M) Bhd and its partner Lion Pacific Sdn Bhd by 2012. Although it faced some delays, the station was opened in 31 March 2016 along with 3 more stations in Puchong.

== Bus services ==
=== Feeder buses ===
Route No.	Origin	Destination	Via	Connecting to
T600	SP24 IOI Puchong Jaya	Taman Wawasan		Terminus

=== Other buses ===
Route No.	Origin	Destination	Via	Connecting to
506	Bandar Utama bus hub	Putrajaya Sentral	KG09 SA01 Bandar Utama; Damansara–Puchong Expressway; Damansara Utama; KJ24 Kelana Jaya; SP24 IOI Puchong Jaya; IOI Mall Puchong; SP25 Pusat Bandar Puchong; Puchong Utama; FT 29 Putrajaya-Cyberjaya Expressway	500, 502, 503, 520, 521, L02, L03, L04, L05, L15, BET13, BET15
600	KJ14 KG16 Pasar Seni (Hub D)	Puchong Utama bus terminal (Jalan PU 7/1)	Jalan Syed Putra; Jalan Tun Sambanthan (KL Sentral); Jalan Sultan Abdul Samad; Jalan Syed Putra (Mid Valley City); Jalan Klang Lama; Pearl Point Shopping Center; Taman OUG; Jalan Puchong–Petaling Jaya; Bandar Kinrara; SP24 IOI Puchong Jaya; Lotus's Puchong; SP25 Pusat Bandar Puchong; SetiaWalk Puchong; Puteri Boulevard; Tractors Malaysia; Jalan Puchong-Dengkil; Jalan Puchong Utama 3	503, 601, 608, T601, T602
601	Kotaraya / KJ14 KG16 Pasar Seni (Hub D)	Putra Perdana	Jalan Syed Putra; Jalan Tun Sambanthan (KL Sentral); Jalan Sultan Abdul Samad; Jalan Syed Putra (Mid Valley City); Jalan Klang Lama; Pearl Point Shopping Center; Taman OUG; Jalan Puchong–Petaling Jaya; Bandar Kinrara; SP24 IOI Puchong Jaya; Lotus's Puchong; SP25 Pusat Bandar Puchong; SetiaWalk Puchong; Giant Bandar Puteri; Sri Begonia Apartment; Sri Camellia Apartment; Lebuh Puteri; Bandar Puteri 6/7/8; Kampung Pasir Puchong; Batu 14 Puchong; Puchong Utama (PU 7/8/9); Taman Meranti Jaya; Bandar Bukit Puchong 2 Taman Desa Ayer Hitam; Jalan Puchong-Dengkil; Jalan Putra Perdana 3A; Jalan Putra Perdana 2A; Jalan Putra Perdana 3B; Jalan Putra Perdana 6A; Bulatan Putra Perdana	503
602	SP24 IOI Puchong Jaya	Puchong Prima	Lotus's Puchong; SetiaWalk Puchong; Puteri Boulevard; Tractors Malaysia; SP28 Puchong Perdana; SP29 Puchong Prima; Pangasapuri Lily; Pangsapuri Melor	T601, T603
604	Kotaraya / KJ14 KG16 Pasar Seni (Hub D)	Taman Saujana Puchong / Bandar Bukit Puchong 1	Jalan Syed Putra; Jalan Tun Sambanthan (KL Sentral); Jalan Sultan Abdul Samad; Jalan Syed Putra (Mid Valley City); Jalan Klang Lama; Pearl Point Shopping Center; Taman OUG; Jalan Puchong–Petaling Jaya; Bandar Kinrara; SP24 IOI Puchong Jaya; Lotus's Puchong; SP25 Pusat Bandar Puchong; SetiaWalk Puchong; HeroMarket Bandar Puteri; Sri Begonia Apartment; Sri Camellia Apartment; Lebuh Puteri; Bandar Puteri 6/7/8; Kampung Pasir Puchong; Batu 14 Puchong; Damansara–Puchong Expressway; Persiaran Saujana Puchong; Jalan Bukit Puchong	T602
608	SP24 IOI Puchong Jaya	Pulau Meranti	SP25 Pusat Bandar Puchong; SetiaWalk Puchong; HeroMarket Bandar Puteri; Sri Begonia Apartment; Sri Camellia Apartment; Lebuh Puteri; Bandar Puteri 6/7/8; Kampung Pasir Puchong; Batu 14 Puchong; Puchong Utama bus terminal (Jalan PU 7/1); Puchong Utama (PU 7/8/9); Taman Meranti Jaya; Bandar Bukit Puchong 2 Taman Desa Ayer Hitam; Jalan Pulau Meranti; Abadi Height; Masjid Pulau Meranti	Terminus
SJ02	SP25 Pusat Bandar Puchong	KJ30 SS18, Subang Jaya	Damansara–Puchong Expressway; Sunway Pyramid; New Pantai Expressway	Terminus

== Station details ==
=== Infrastructure ===
As part of a green initiative, the LEP project included green practices. Energy-efficient lights and rainwater harvesting systems were installed in every station. Windows were designed to allow sunlight into the stations. Construction utilized sustainable materials and recycling practices.

=== Facilities ===
The stations includes several stores such as a 7-Eleven grocery store, a health and beauty product shop, and an ASTRO service centre. A shuttle buggy ride to-and-fro IOI Mall Puchong is provided.

== Gallery ==
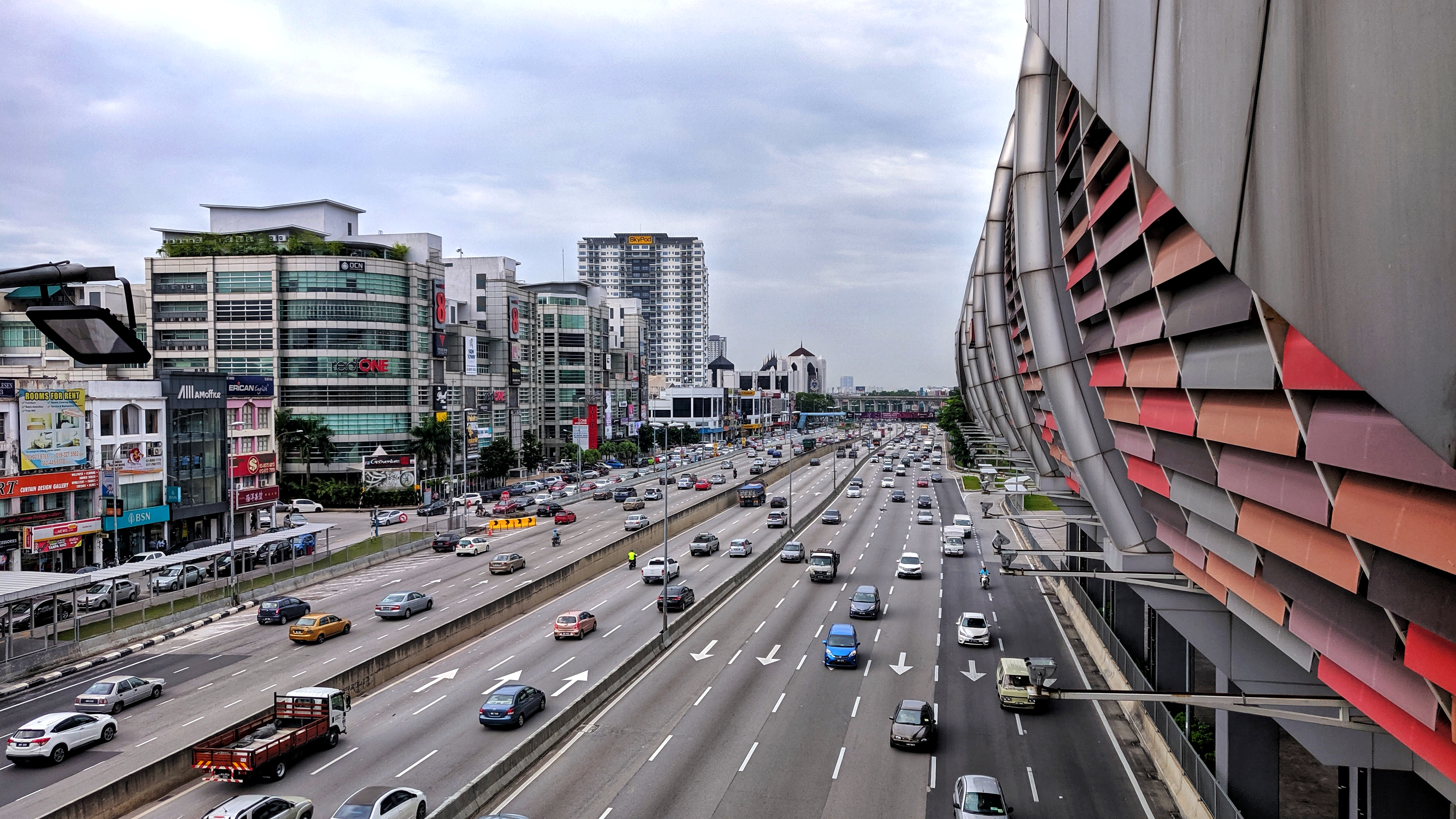
View of the Damansara-Puchong Expressway from the station

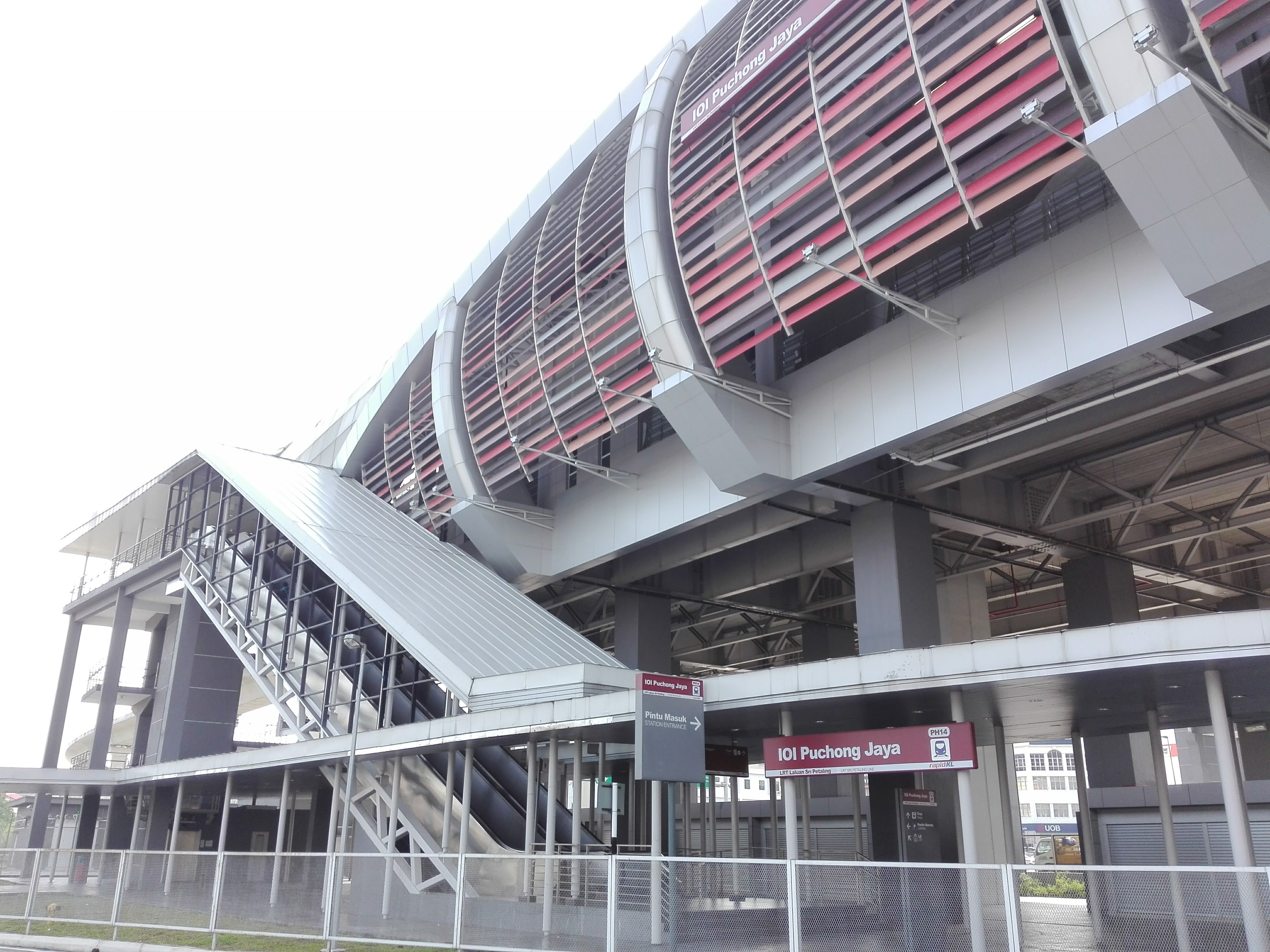
Exterior of the station from the bus stop

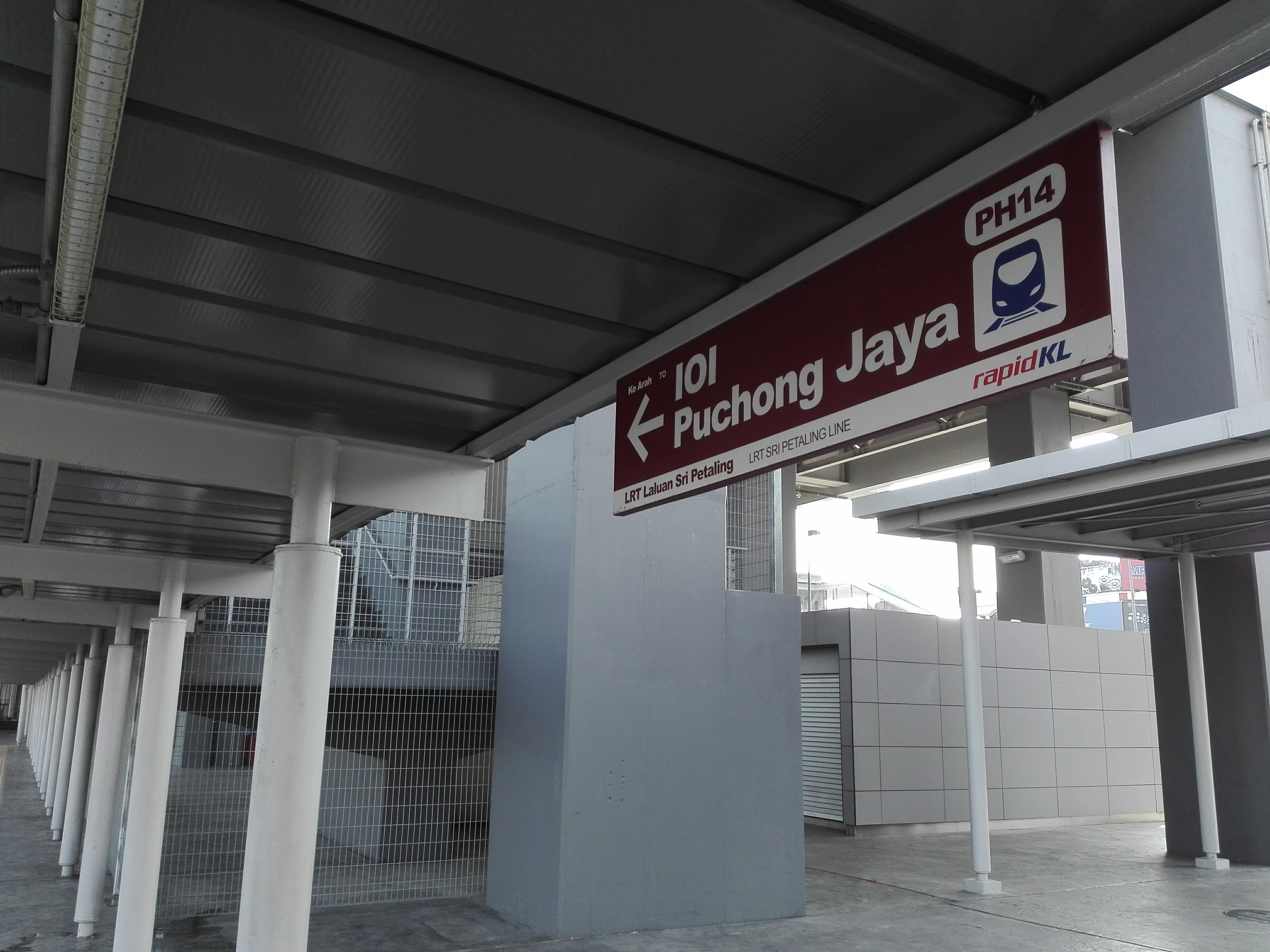
Wayfinding signboard

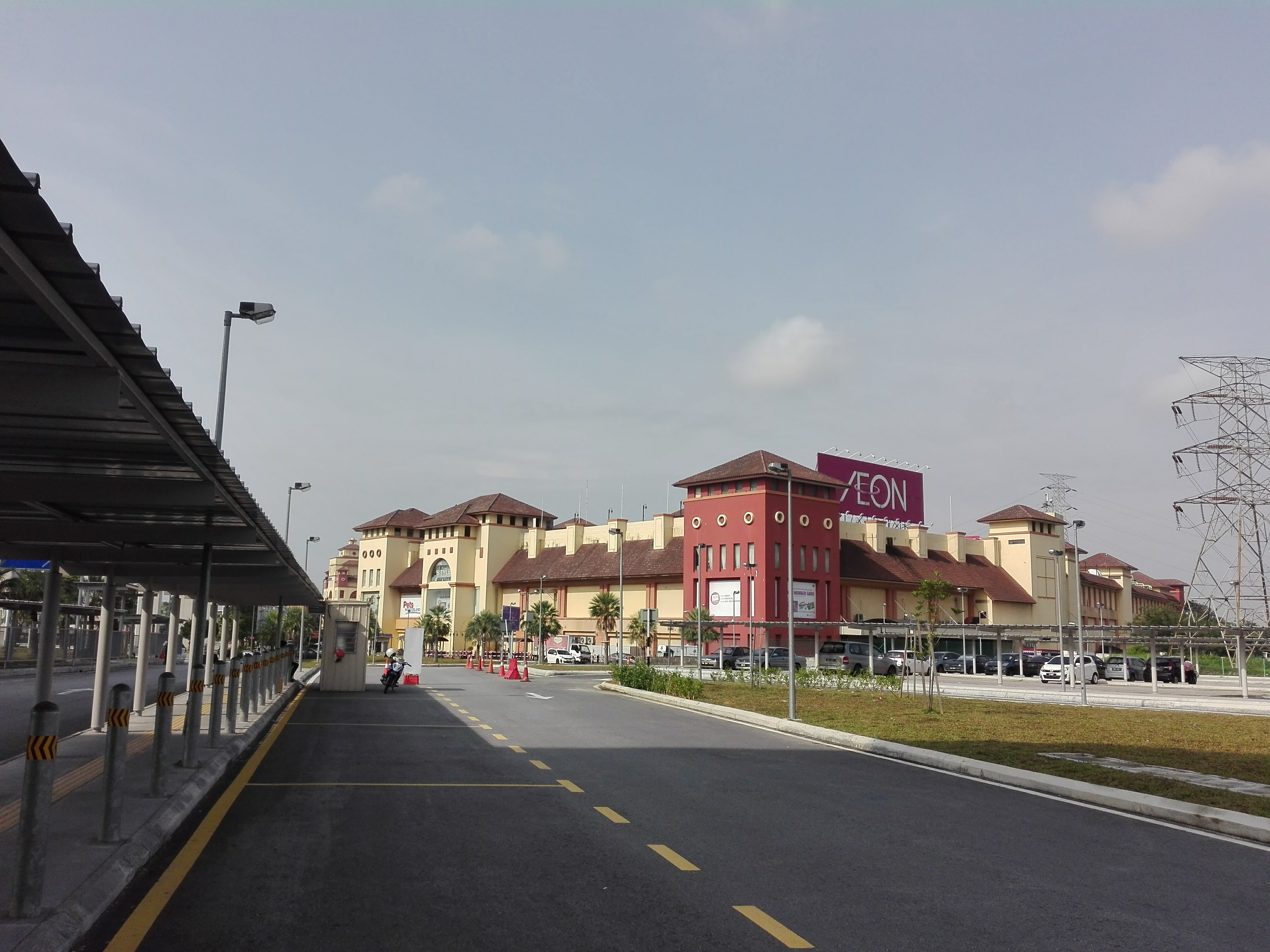
View of IOI Mall Puchong, located within walking distance from the station

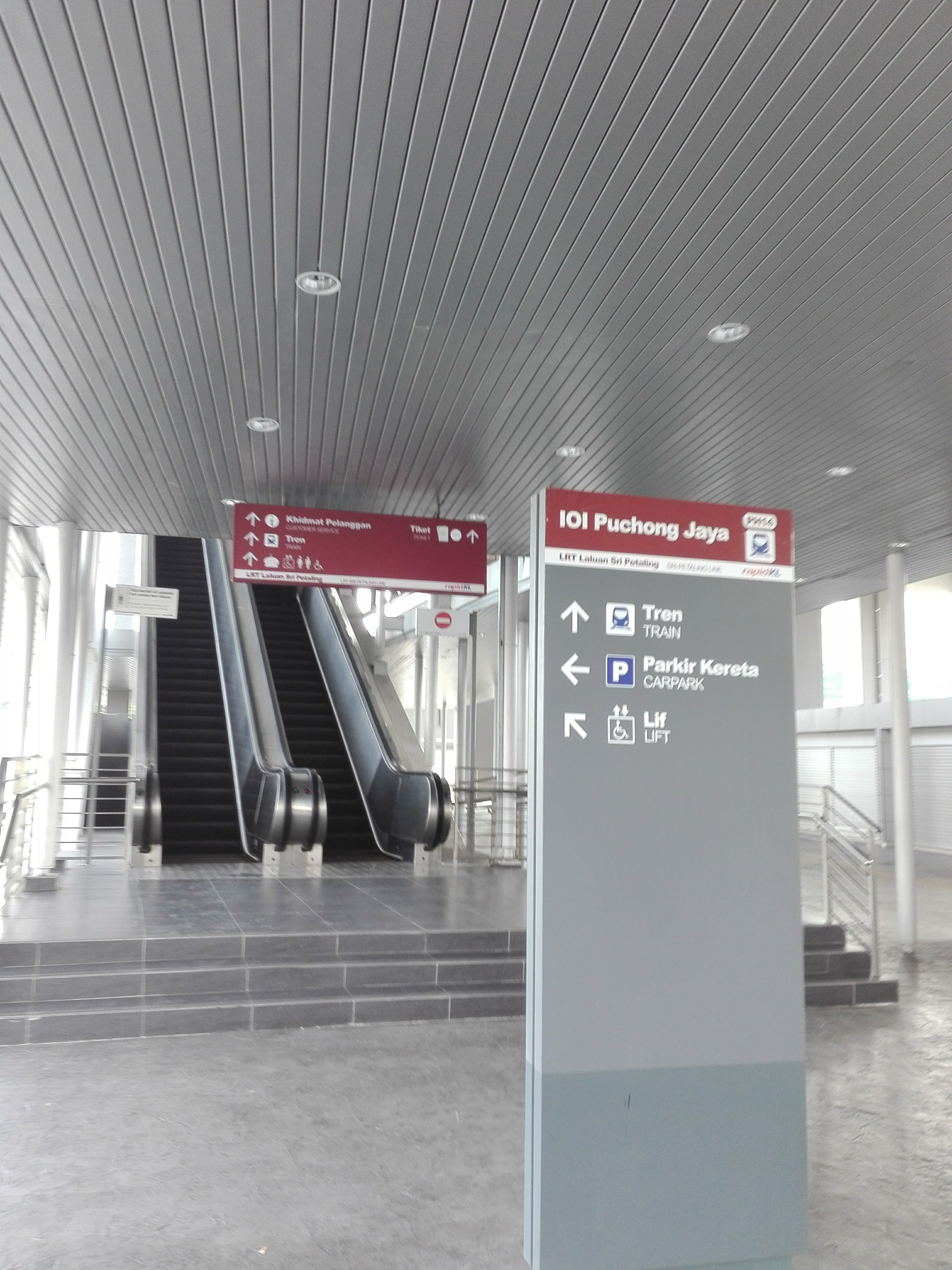
Elevator near the bus stop leading up to the concourse level of the station

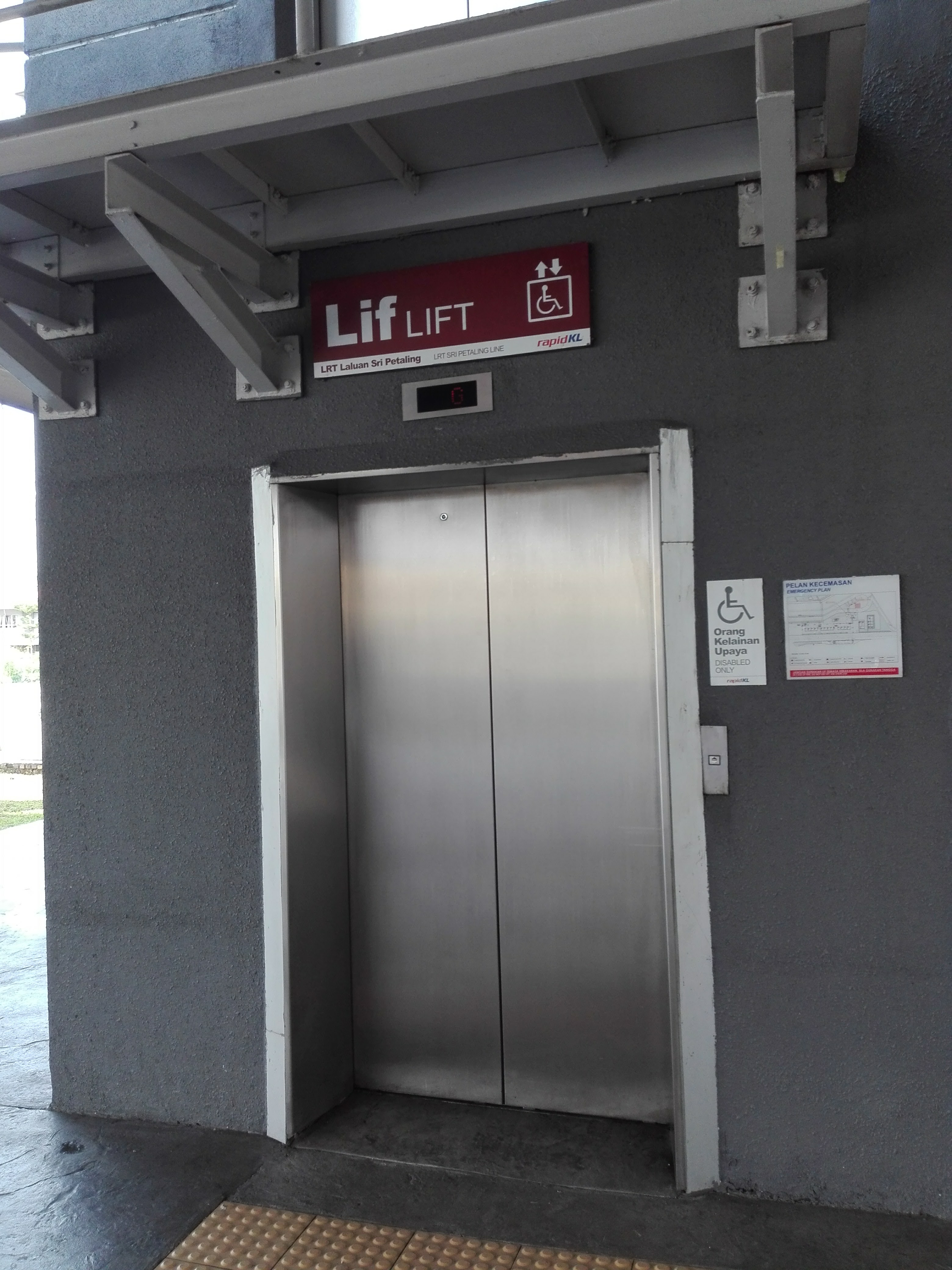
Lift for the disabled

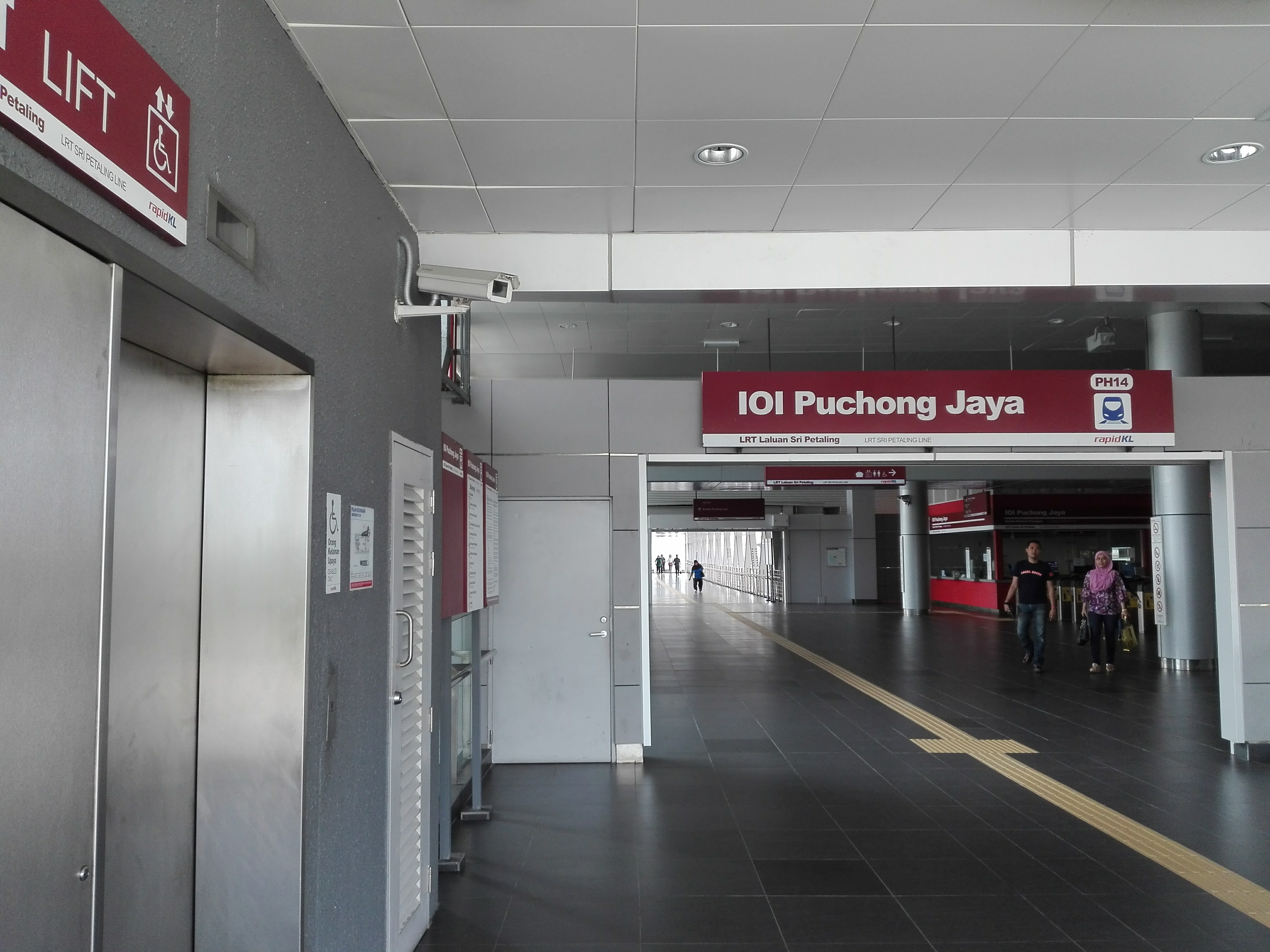
Station's concourse entrance

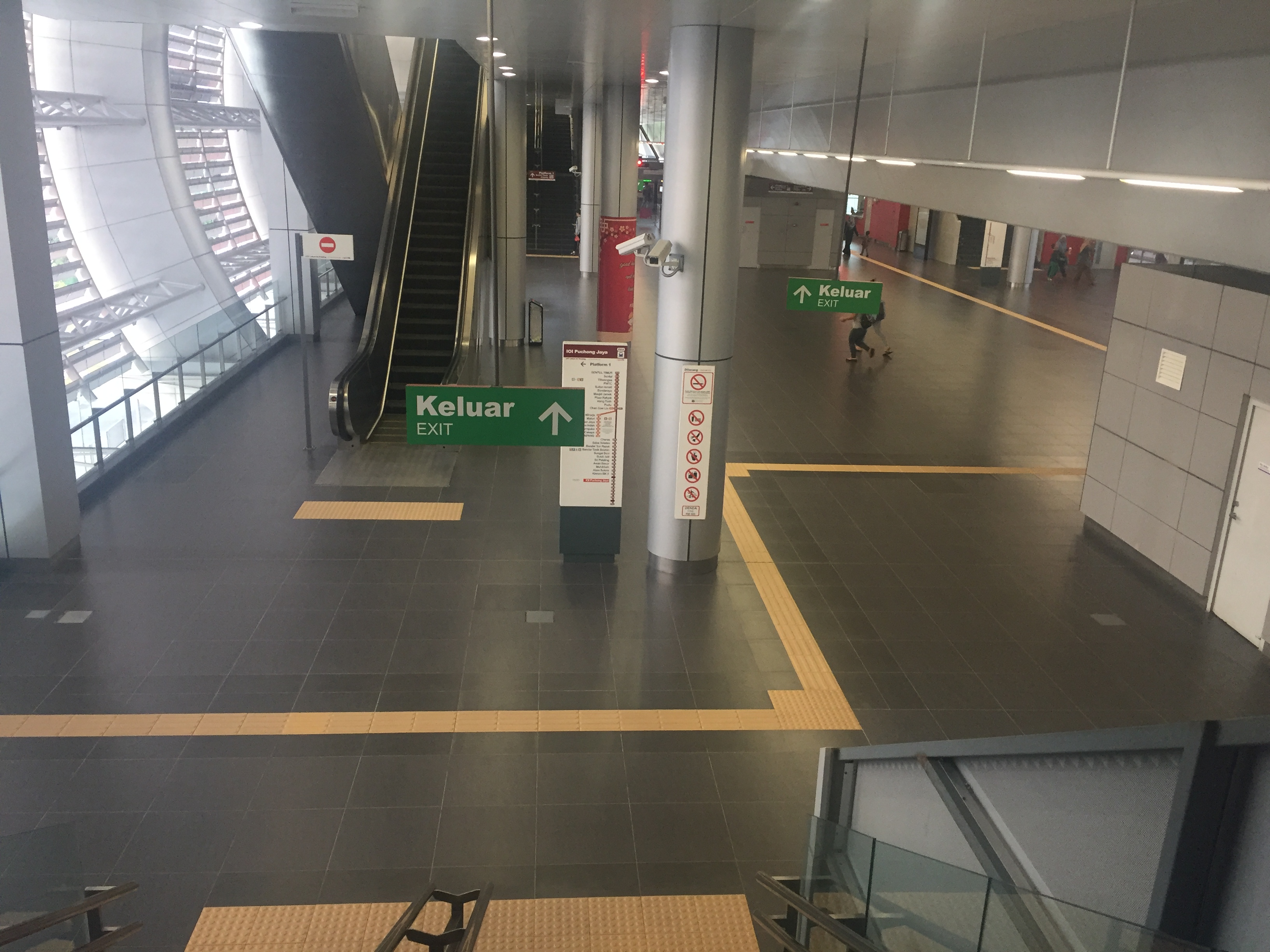
Escalators that lead to the platforms

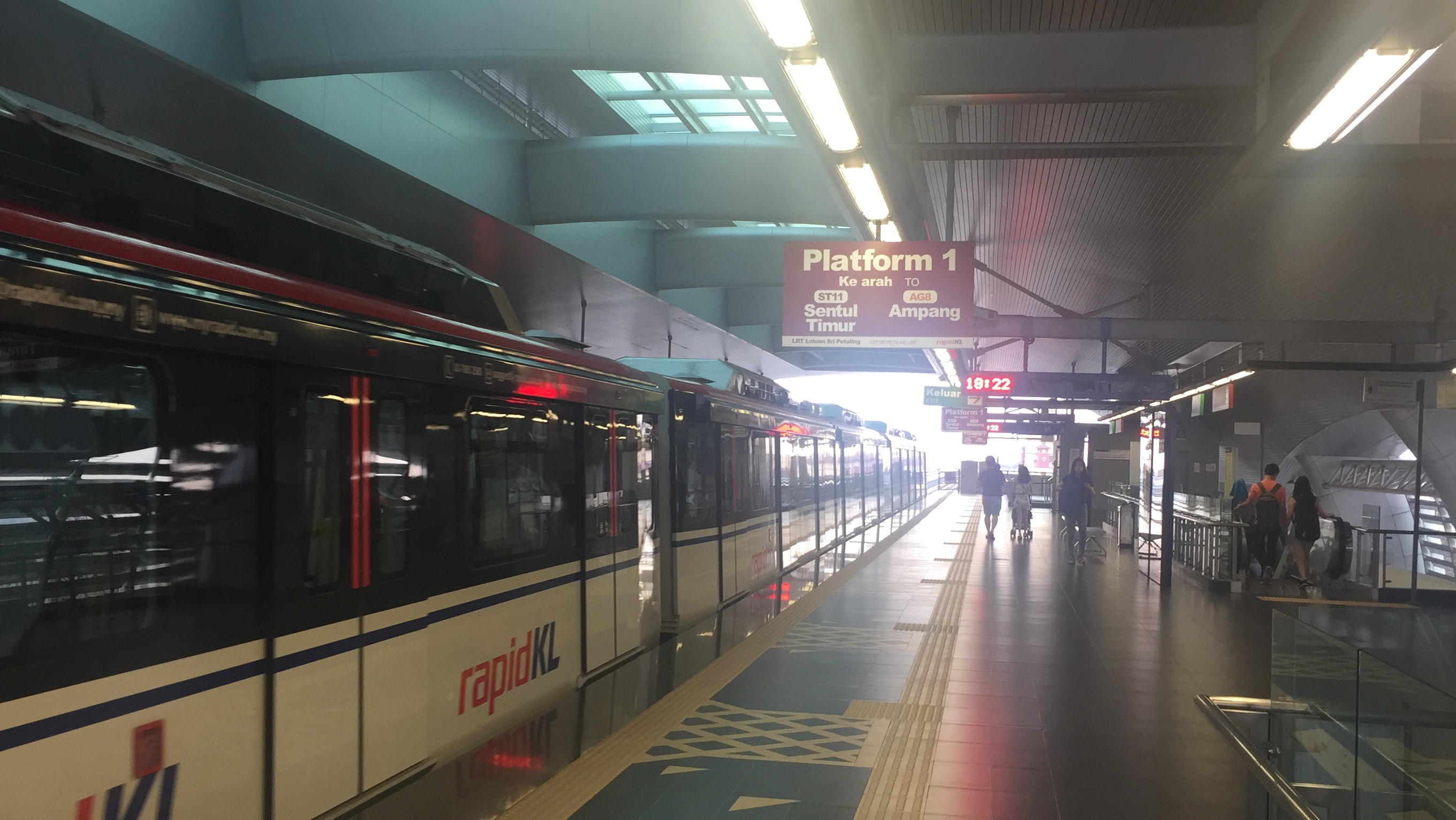
Platform 1 of the station with the 6-car train set of the CSR Zhuzhou LRV.

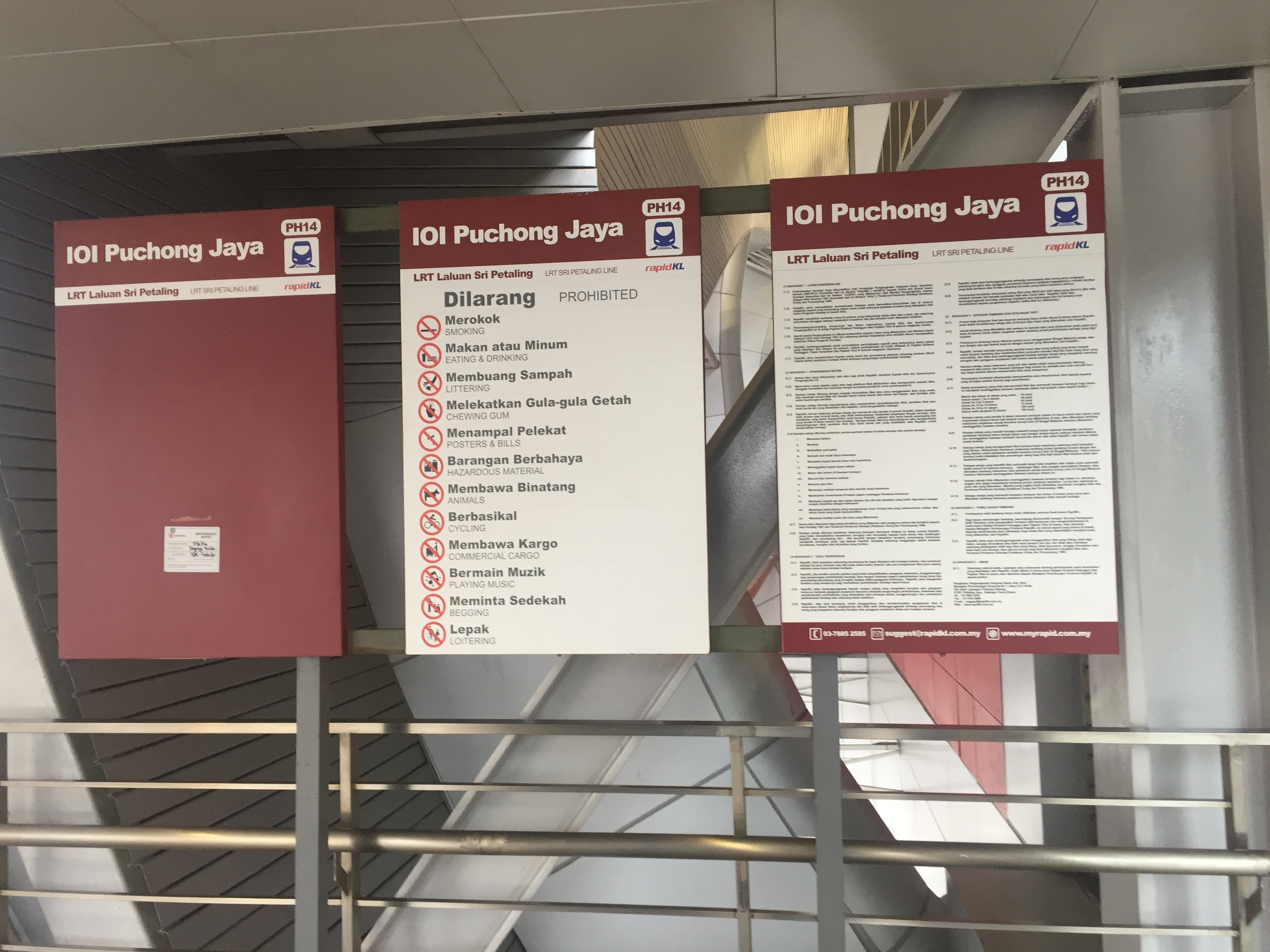
Notice boards at the station

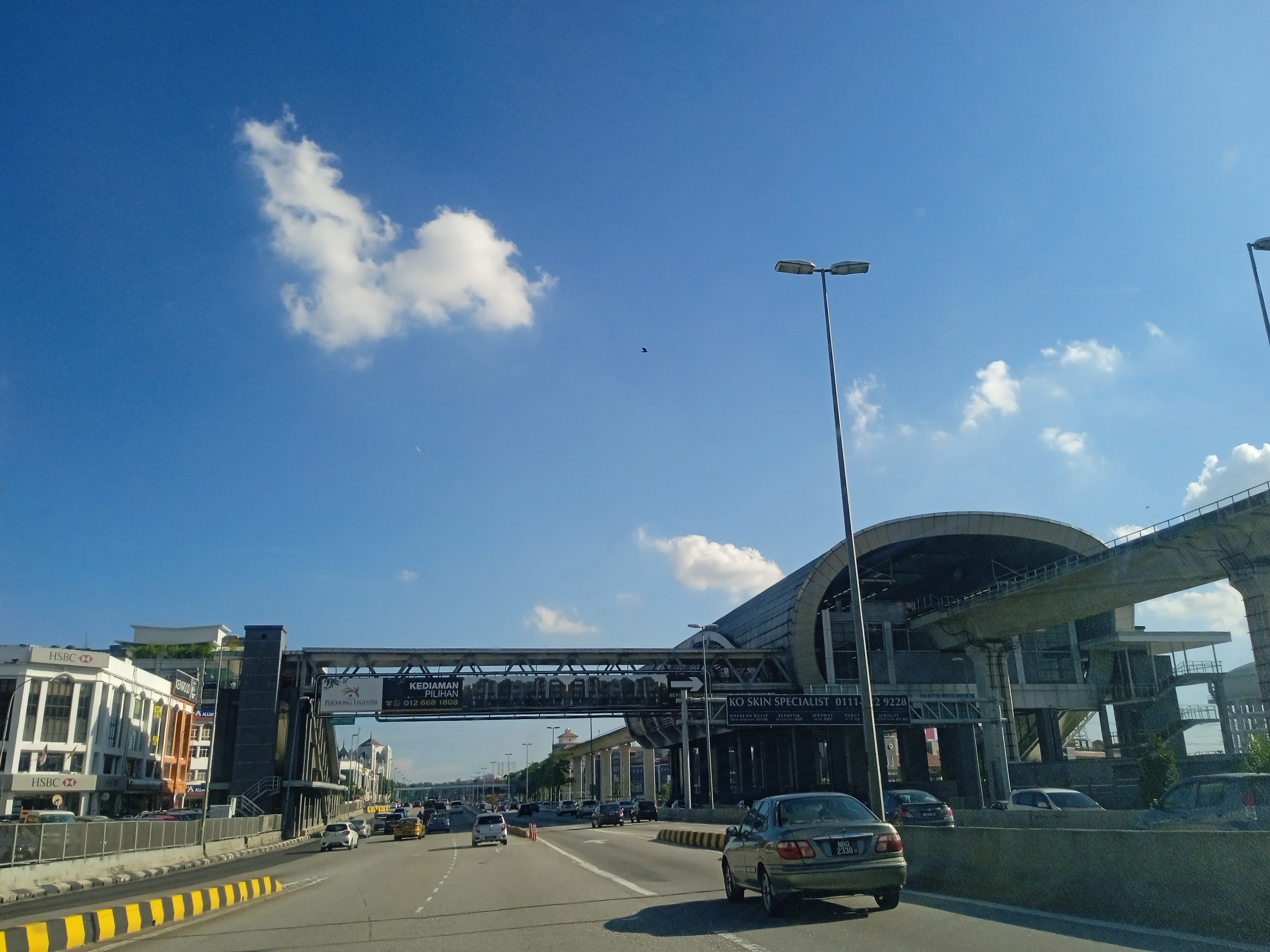
View of the station from the southbound carriageway of the Damansara-Puchong Expressway

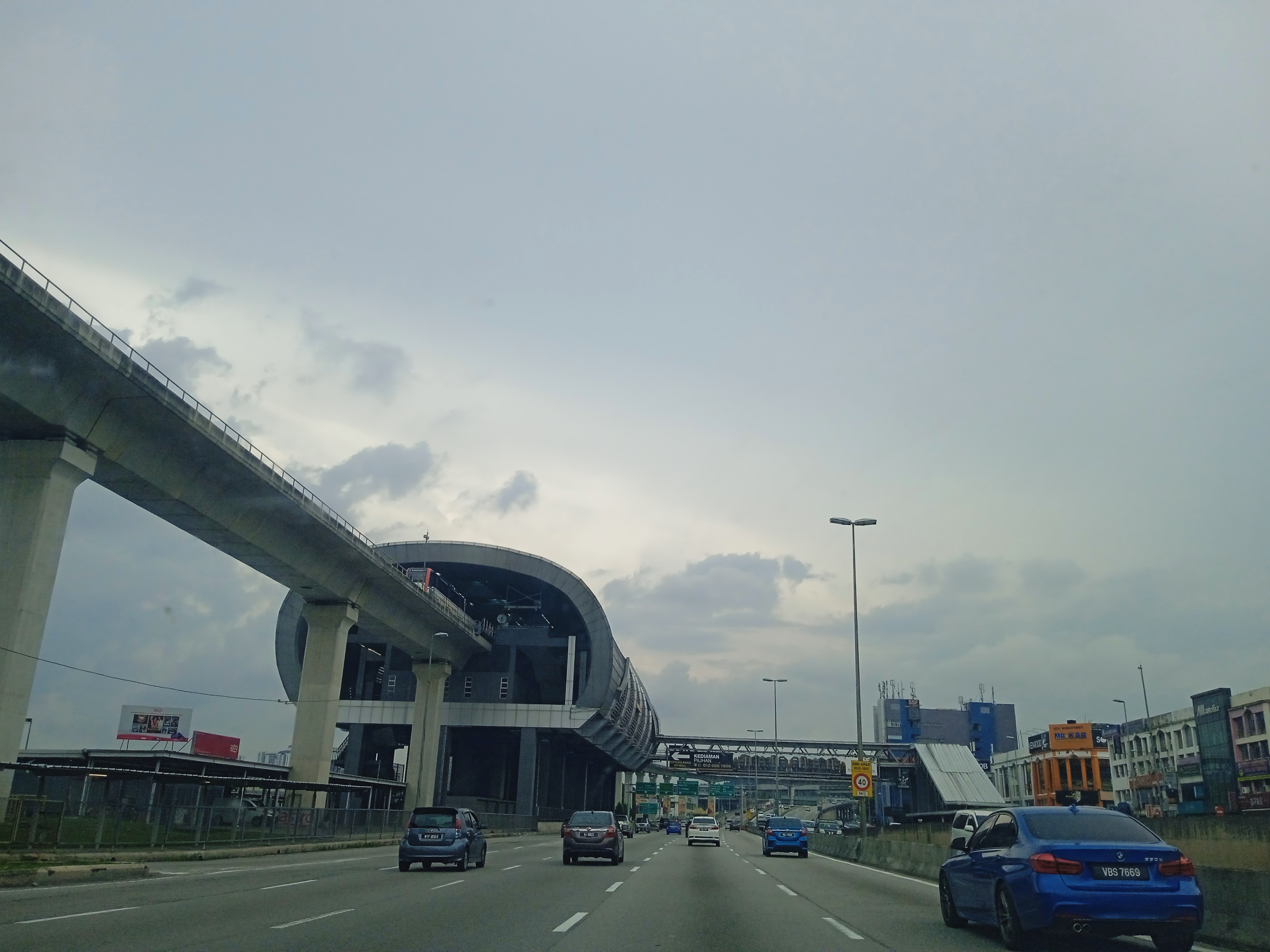
View of the station from the northbound carriageway of the Damansara-Puchong Expressway
