= Pusat Bandar Puchong LRT station =

Metro station in Selangor, Malaysia

SP25 Pusat Bandar Puchong
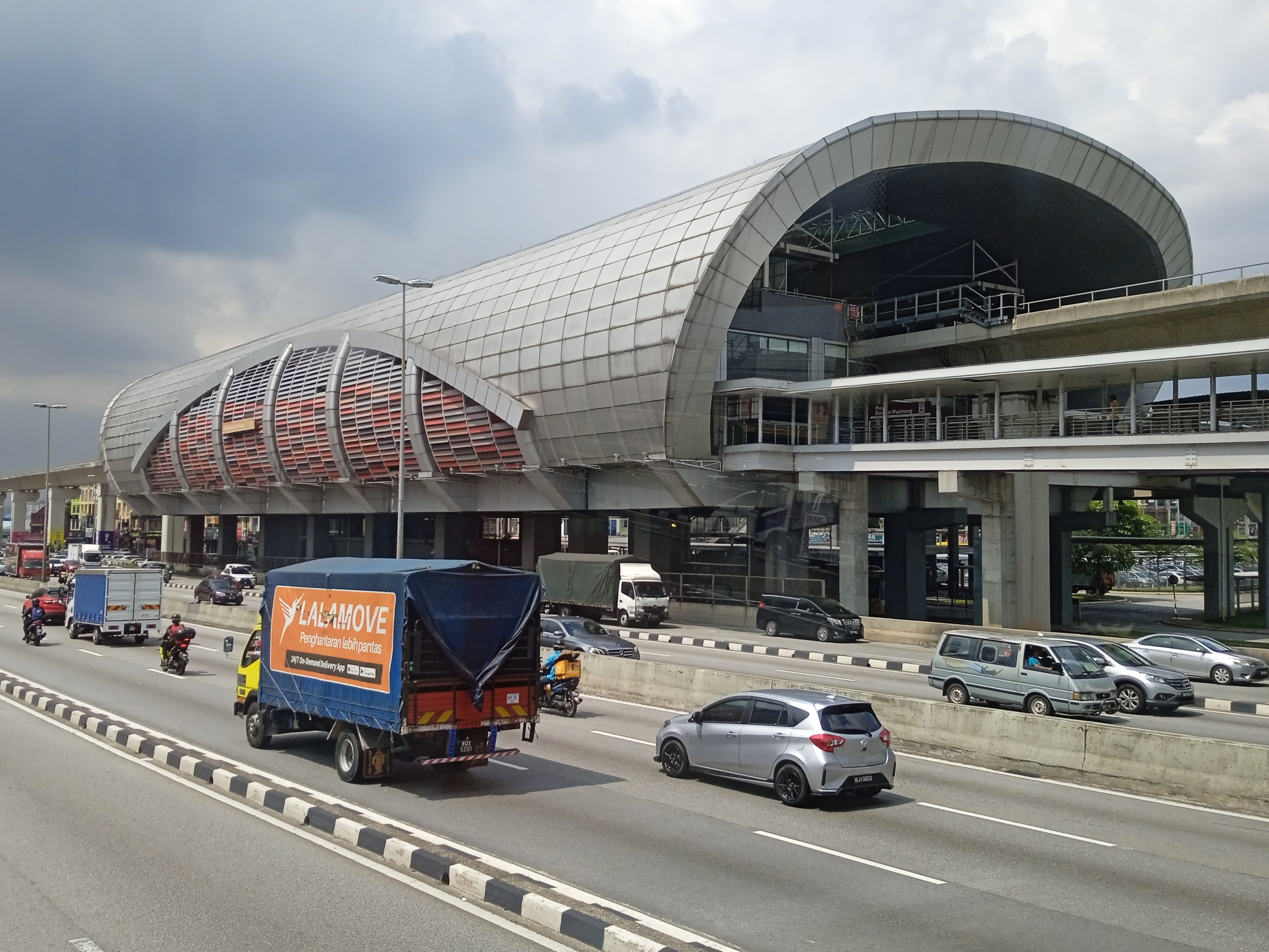
- View of the station from Damansara-Puchong Expressway (LDP)

General information
- Other names: Malay: ڤوست باندر ڤوچوڠ (Jawi); Chinese: 蒲种市中心; Tamil: பூச்சோங் நகர மையம்
- Location: Jalan Bandar Tiga, Pusat Bandar Puchong, 47100 Puchong; Selangor; Malaysia
- Coordinates: 3°1′59.8″N 101°36′57.7″E
- System: Rapid KL
- Owner: Prasarana Malaysia
- Operator: Rapid Rail
- Line: 4 Sri Petaling Line
- Platforms: 2 side platforms
- Tracks: 2

Construction
- Structure type: Elevated
- Parking: Available with payment. 120 total parking bays.
- Cycle facilities: 20 bicycle racks available.

Other information
- Station code: SP25

History
- Opened: 31 March 2016; 10 years ago

Services
Preceding station		Following station
IOI Puchong Jaya towards Sentul Timur	Sri Petaling Line	Taman Perindustrian Puchong towards Putra Heights
Location

The Pusat Bandar Puchong LRT station is a light rapid transit (LRT) station serving the Puchong town centre in Selangor. It is part of the LRT Sri Petaling Line. The station is located beside the busy Damansara–Puchong Expressway (LDP). Like most other LRT stations operating in the Klang Valley, this station is an elevated station, which consists of two side platforms.

The station is located near Lotus's Puchong and it is about 25 km south of Kuala Lumpur, the capital of Malaysia. A pedestrian bridge over the LDP connects the station to SetiaWalk. The station also provides a direct link to Lotus's Puchong via a pedestrian bridge. It mainly serves the residences of Pusat Bandar Puchong, Taman Wawasan Puchong and Bandar Puteri Puchong. Shop lots can also be found near Lotus's Puchong, as well as SetiaWalk.

The station is a part of the LRT Sri Petaling Line extension project which was proposed in 2006. The station was opened on 31 March 2016 as part of the Phase 2 of the project, which included another 3 stations in Puchong.

== History ==
The extension of both Sri Petaling Line and Kelana Jaya Line was announced on 29 August 2006 by then Deputy Prime Minister of Malaysia Najib Razak. This was also confirmed by then Prime Minister of Malaysia Abdullah Ahmad Badawi in his National Budget speech in 2006. The current site of the station was confirmed in 2007 and was initially named Bandar Metro Puchong.

Construction started in 2010, while fault-free test runs of the trains at the station started on 22 January 2016. Although it faced some delays, the station was opened on 31 March 2016, as part of the second phase of the extension project.

The construction was claimed to have caused damages on the roads and shops in the nearby areas. The construction of the extension project was also said to have caused flash floods in the area surrounding the station. The slow progress of the construction raised many complaints by the residents nearby. It also caused a disruption of businesses to the shop owners nearby as the construction occupied the parking spaces provided in the area.

== Incidents and accidents ==
An Indian man was found dead 100 metres away from the station. Based on the station's CCTV footage, the man was walking on the tracks before he was hit by the train. The victim was pronounced dead at the scene. The accident caused the service of the line to be temporarily disrupted to allow police to remove the body from the location.

In October 2018, the lift of the station broke down (Note: Investigation later shows that the breakdown was caused by a flash flood near the station as the water seeped into the lift and damaged the printed circuit board.) and caused disabled commuters to be stranded at the station. Prasarana Malaysia later apologised and the lift was repaired by the next day.

On 3 June 2025, a 63-year-old Taiwanese man was pronounced dead after falling onto the LRT tracks at this station. Based on CCTV footage, initial reports suggested that the death was an accident. The Royal Malaysian Police have opened an investigation into the matter.

== Station ==
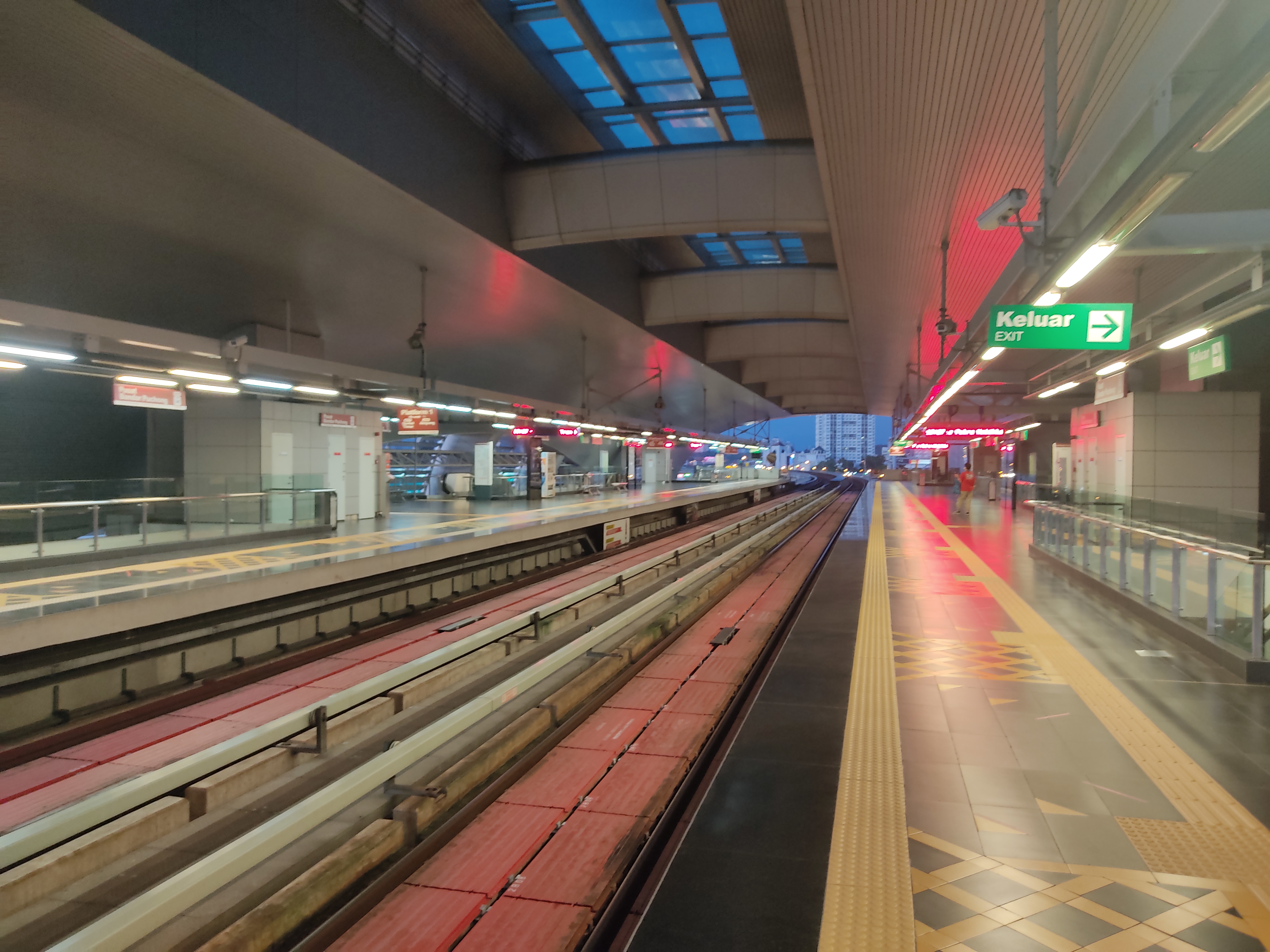
Platforms of the station

=== Station Layout ===
Park-and-ride facilities are provided in the station with 120 parking bays. A convenience store, operated by 7-Eleven as well as a cafe, can be found in the station. As a part of the initiative of making all stations accessible to the disabled, the station provides disabled-friendly facilities such as accessibility lifts, accessible toilets, special gate entrance for wheelchair users, and tactile paving provided throughout the station. The platform gap is reduced to a minimum to allow easy boarding for wheelchair users.

P	Side platform, doors will open on the left
P	Platform 2:	4 Sri Petaling Line towards SP31 Putra Heights (→)
P	Platform 1:	4 Sri Petaling Line towards SP1 AG1 Sentul Timur (←)
P	Side platform, doors will open on the left
C	Concourse level	Ticket vending machine, faregates, customer service office, pedestrian bridge
G	Street level	Park N' Ride, bus stop, bus information kiosk, convenience store
refers to accessibility lift for disabled.

=== Green Practices ===
As part of a green initiative launched by Prasarana, the station includes several green practices. Energy-efficient lights and rainwater harvesting systems were installed, and the glass louvers were designed to allow sunlight into the stations. The construction of the station utilized sustainable materials and recycling practices.

=== Entrances and Exits ===
The LRT station has a total of two entrances/exits, one heading towards Lotus's Puchong, and another leads to SetiaWalk.

Sri Petaling Line station
Entrance	Location	Destination	Picture
A	Jalan Bandar Tiga	Lotus's Puchong, Bandar Puchong, Taman Mutiara Puchong	
B	Jalan Bandar 1	Setia Walk, Taman Wawasan	

== Bus Services ==
=== Local/Feeder buses ===
Route No.	Origin	Destination	Via	Connecting to
T600	SP24 IOI Puchong Jaya; SP25 Pusat Bandar Puchong	Taman Wawasan	Damansara–Puchong Expressway; Persiaran Indera; Persiaran Wawasan	Terminus
T604	SP26 Taman Perindustrian Puchong	SP25 Pusat Bandar Puchong	Damansara–Puchong Expressway; Jalan Puchong–Petaling Jaya; Jalan Bandar Puchong Jaya; Jalan Bandar 7 Jalan Sri Puchong 1	Terminus
SJ02	SP25 Pusat Bandar Puchong	KJ30 SS18, Subang Jaya	Damansara–Puchong Expressway; SB3 Sunway Lagoon; New Pantai Expressway	Terminus

=== Trunk buses ===
Route No.	Origin	Destination	Via	Connecting to
506 (Note: Short walk from its closest station, SJ 337 Tesco Puchong (Opp))	Bandar Utama bus hub	KT3 PY41 Putrajaya Sentral	KG09 SA01 Bandar Utama; Damansara–Puchong Expressway; Damansara Utama; KJ24 Kelana Jaya; SP24 IOI Puchong Jaya; IOI Mall Puchong; SP25 Pusat Bandar Puchong; Puchong Utama; FT 29 Putrajaya-Cyberjaya Expressway	500, 502, 503, 520, 521, L02, L03, L04, L05, L15, BET13, BET15
600 (Note: Short walk from its closest station, SJ 449 Setia Walk (Selatan))	KJ14 KG16 Pasar Seni (Hub D)	Puchong Utama bus terminal (Jalan PU 7/1)	Jalan Syed Putra; Jalan Tun Sambanthan (KL Sentral); Jalan Sultan Abdul Samad; Jalan Syed Putra (Mid Valley); Jalan Klang Lama; Pearl Point Shopping Center; Taman OUG; Jalan Puchong–Petaling Jaya; Bandar Kinrara; SP24 IOI Puchong Jaya; Lotus's Puchong; SP25 Pusat Bandar Puchong; SetiaWalk Puchong; Puteri Boulevard; Tractors Malaysia; Jalan Puchong-Dengkil; Jalan Puchong Utama 3	601, 608, T601, T602
601 (Note: Six minute walk from its closest station, SJ 609 Setia Walk (Selatan))	Kotaraya / KJ14 KG16 Pasar Seni (Hub D)	Putra Perdana	Jalan Syed Putra; Jalan Tun Sambanthan (KL Sentral); Jalan Sultan Abdul Samad; Jalan Syed Putra (Mid Valley); Jalan Klang Lama; Pearl Point Shopping Center; Taman OUG; Jalan Puchong–Petaling Jaya; Bandar Kinrara; SP24 IOI Puchong Jaya; Lotus's Puchong; SP25 Pusat Bandar Puchong; SetiaWalk Puchong; HeroMarket Bandar Puteri; Sri Begonia Apartment; Sri Camellia Apartment; Lebuh Puteri; Bandar Puteri 6/7/8; Kampung Pasir Puchong; Batu 14 Puchong; Puchong Utama (PU 7/8/9); Taman Meranti Jaya; Bandar Bukit Puchong 2 Taman Desa Ayer Hitam; Jalan Puchong–Dengkil; Jalan Putra Perdana 3A; Jalan Putra Perdana 2A; Jalan Putra Perdana 3B; Jalan Putra Perdana 6A; Bulatan Putra Perdana	503
602 (Note: Six minute walk from its closest station, SJ 609 Setia Walk (Selatan))	SP24 IOI Puchong Jaya	Puchong Prima	Lotus's Puchong; SP25 Pusat Bandar Puchong; SetiaWalk Puchong; Puteri Boulevard; Tractors Malaysia; SP28 Puchong Perdana; SP29 Puchong Prima; Pangasapuri Lily; Pangsapuri Melor	T601, T603
604 (Note: Six minute walk from its closest station, SJ 609 Setia Walk (Selatan))	Kotaraya / KJ14 KG16 Pasar Seni (Hub D)	Taman Saujana Puchong / Bandar Bukit Puchong 1	Jalan Syed Putra; Jalan Tun Sambanthan (KL Sentral); Jalan Sultan Abdul Samad; Jalan Syed Putra (Mid Valley); Jalan Klang Lama; Pearl Point Shopping Center; Taman OUG; Jalan Puchong–Petaling Jaya; Bandar Kinrara; SP24 IOI Puchong Jaya; Lotus's Puchong; SP25 Pusat Bandar Puchong; SetiaWalk Puchong; HeroMarket Bandar Puteri; Sri Begonia Apartment; Sri Camellia Apartment; Lebuh Puteri; Bandar Puteri 6/7/8; Kampung Pasir Puchong; Batu 14 Puchong; Damansara–Puchong Expressway; Persiaran Saujana Puchong; Jalan Bukit Puchong	T602
608 (Note: Six minute walk from its closest station, SJ 609 Setia Walk (Selatan))	SP24 IOI Puchong Jaya	Pulau Meranti	SP25 Pusat Bandar Puchong; SetiaWalk Puchong, HeroMarket Bandar Puteri; Sri Begonia Apartment; Sri Camellia Apartment; Lebuh Puteri; Bandar Puteri 6/7/8; Kampung Pasir Puchong; Batu 14 Puchong; Puchong Utama bus terminal (Jalan PU 7/1); Puchong Utama (PU 7/8/9); Taman Meranti Jaya; Bandar Bukit Puchong 2 Taman Desa Ayer Hitam; Jalan Pulau Meranti; Abadi Height; Masjid Pulau Meranti	Terminus
