= Putrajaya Sentral =

Bus hub and train station in Putrajaya, Malaysia

Coordinates: 2°55′53.5″N 101°40′15.4″E

PY41 Putrajaya Sentral; KT3 Putrajaya & Cyberjaya
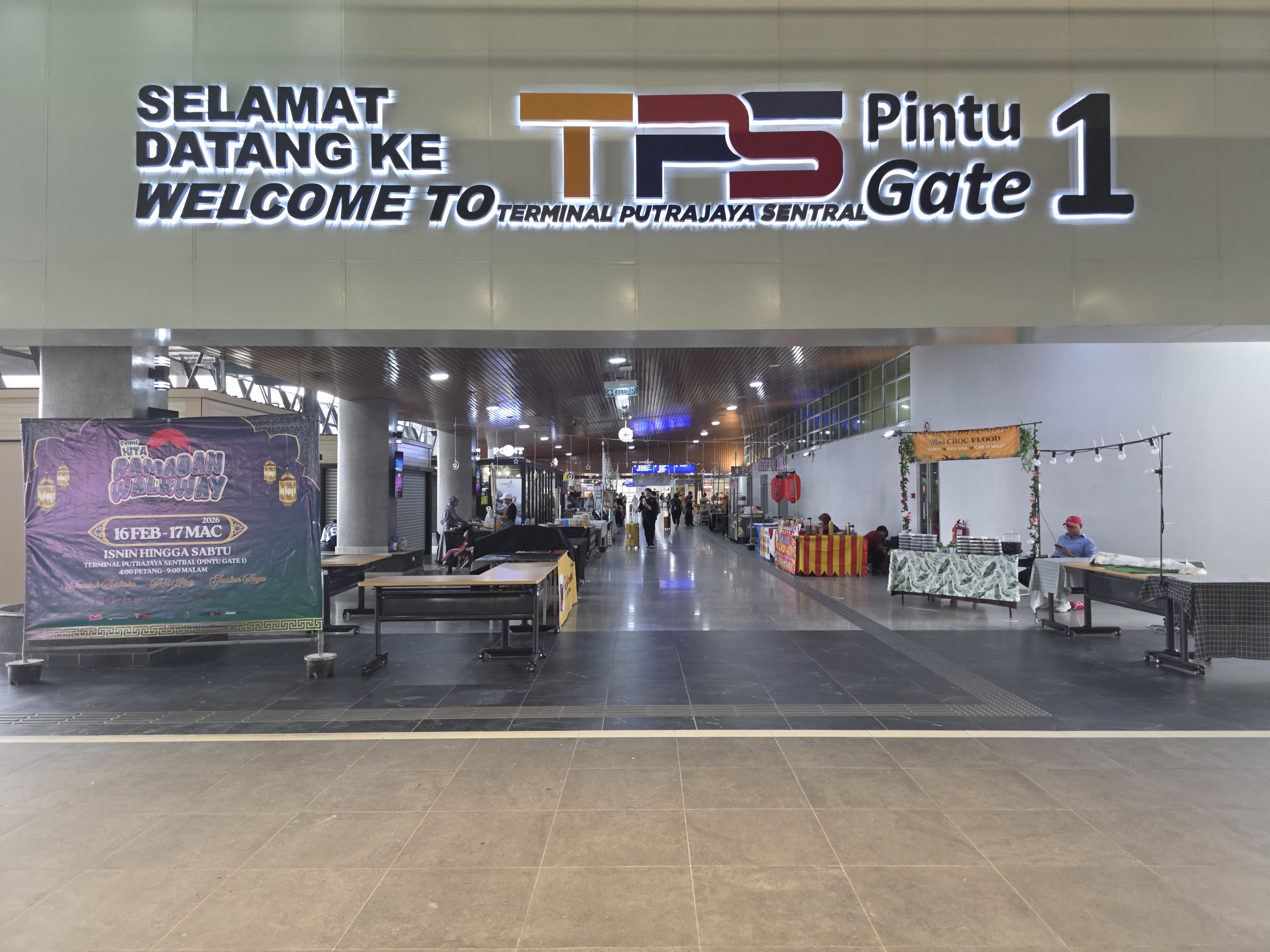
- Gate 1 of Putrajaya Sentral

General information
- Other names: Malay: ڤوتراجاي سينترل (Jawi); Chinese: 布城中环; Tamil: புத்ராஜெயா செண்ட்ரல்
- Location: Presint 7, 62000 Putrajaya; Malaysia
- System: Rapid KL (MRT)
- Owner: Express Rail Link (ERL); MRT Corp (MRT)
- Operator: Express Rail Link (ERL); Rapid Rail (MRT)
- Lines: 7 KLIA Transit; 12 Putrajaya Line; 14 Putrajaya Monorail (planned)
- Platforms: 2 island platforms (ERL); 1 island platform (MRT); 1 island platform (Monorail)
- Tracks: 4 (ERL); 2 (MRT); 2 (Monorail)

Construction
- Structure type: Surface (ERL); Elevated (MRT & Monorail)
- Parking: Available with payment
- Cycle facilities: Available
- Accessible: Available

Other information
- Status: Operational
- Station code: KT3 PY41

History
- Opened: 20 June 2002; 24 years ago (ERL); 16 March 2023; 3 years ago (MRT)

Services
Preceding station	Express Rail Link	Following station
Bandar Tasik Selatan towards Kuala Lumpur Sentral	KLIA Transit	Salak Tinggi towards KLIA T2
KLIA Ekspres does not stop here
Preceding station		Following station
Cyberjaya City Centre towards Kwasa Damansara	Putrajaya Line	Terminus
Location

Putrajaya Sentral is a bus hub and integrated train station in Presint 7, Putrajaya, Malaysia. It is served by the MRT Putrajaya Line, as well as the ERL KLIA Transit Line under the name Putrajaya & Cyberjaya.

Putrajaya Sentral also comprises other multimodal transport services apart from the ERL & MRT stations, which includes the unfinished Putrajaya Monorail station (abandoned as of now), a taxi centre, and a bus hub (currently utilised by Rapid KL and Nadi Putra buses) that has city buses serving Putrajaya, express buses and scheduled intercity buses. The station complex also contains a couple of restaurants and shops selling clothes. It is also connected to a 92,000 sq ft (8,500 m^{2}) mall called Destina Putrajaya.

== Station building ==
A common concourse exists for both the KLIA Transit platforms and the Putrajaya Monorail platforms. The new MRT station is located on the eastern side of the complex and is connected to the main building via a pedestrian walkway.

== Bus services ==
Putrajaya Sentral is also a bus terminal with four terminals. The intercity express bus services and shuttle to Heriot-Watt University Malaysia branch are located in Terminal B.

=== Trunk and feeder buses ===
All trunk and feeder buses are located in Terminal D near the MRT station. With the opening of the MRT Putrajaya Line, five feeder buses also began operating, linking the station with areas in Putrajaya. From 16 January 2026, only two of the feeder routes (T509 and T511) are in operation, as the other three routes (T508, T510 and T512, in addition to all trunk routes by RapidKL) were discontinued and replaced with Rapid KL On-Demand routes. Low ridership was cited as the reason for their termination.

Platform	Route No.	Operator	Origin	Desitination	Via	Connecting to
4	T509	Rapid KL (MRT Feeder Bus)	KT3 PY41 Putrajaya Sentral	Presint 16	Lebuh Wawasan; Seri Wawasan Bridge; Jalan Tun Razak, Putrajaya; Lebuh Bestari; Wisma Putra; Jalan P16; Alamanda Putrajaya; Lebuh Perdana Timur; Dataran Pahlawan Negara; Lebuh Perdana Selatan; Jalan Enggang P9	P101, P105, P106
6	T511	Rapid KL (MRT Feeder Bus)	KT3 PY41 Putrajaya Sentral	Presint 4	Lebuh Wawasan; Seri Wawasan Bridge; Persiaran Perdana; Dataran Gemilang; Jalan Enggang P9	P101, P104, P105, P107
9	P108	Rapid KL (Nadiputra Putrajaya)	KT3 PY41 Putrajaya Sentral	Kompleks ABCDEF, Presint 1	Jalan Enggang P9; Jalan Tempua P9B; Lebuh Perdana Barat; Persiaran Sultan Salahuddin Abdul Aziz Shah	523, T508, T509
10	T523	KR Travel & Tours	KT3 PY41 Putrajaya Sentral	Mydin Sinar Kota, Kuala Lumpur (Hub Lebuh Pudu) ( AG7 SP7 KJ13 Masjid Jamek)	Jalan Enggang P9; Jalan Tempua P9B; Lebuh Perdana Barat; Dataran Putra; Alamanda Putrajaya; IOI City Mall; Serdang Hospital; Sungai Besi Expressway; KB05 Serdang; KJ14 KG16 Pasar Seni	100, 103, 107, 120, 121, 122, 150, 151, 153, 400; 450, 540, 590, T571, SJ04, SPG04, BET2, BET5, BET6, BET8, BET13

=== On-Demand Routes ===
Rapid Bus on-demand routes are available in Putrajaya Sentral, serving most of the Putrajaya areas, and operate every day from 6.00 am to 11.00 pm.

Route No.	Origin	Destination	App
T508B	KT3 PY41 Putrajaya Sentral	Presint 1, 8, 9, 10, 11	Rapid on-Demand
T512B	KT3 PY41 Putrajaya Sentral	Presint 2, 3, 4, 8, 9, 11	Rapid on-Demand
T513B	KT3 PY41 Putrajaya Sentral	Presint 1, 2, 3, 4, 14, 15, 16, 17; Alamanda	Rapid on-Demand
T514B	KT3 PY41 Putrajaya Sentral	Presint 1, 2, 3, 4, 5, 6, 8, 18; Putrajaya International Convention Centre (PICC); Desa Pinggiran Putra; Cybersouth; UiTM Dengkil	Rapid on-Demand

Presint 12 (Wetland Park), 13, 19, and 20 (Challenge Park) are not served by Rapid Bus on-demand. IOI Resort City is served through T568B on-demand route from UPM MRT station.

=== Discontinued Lines ===
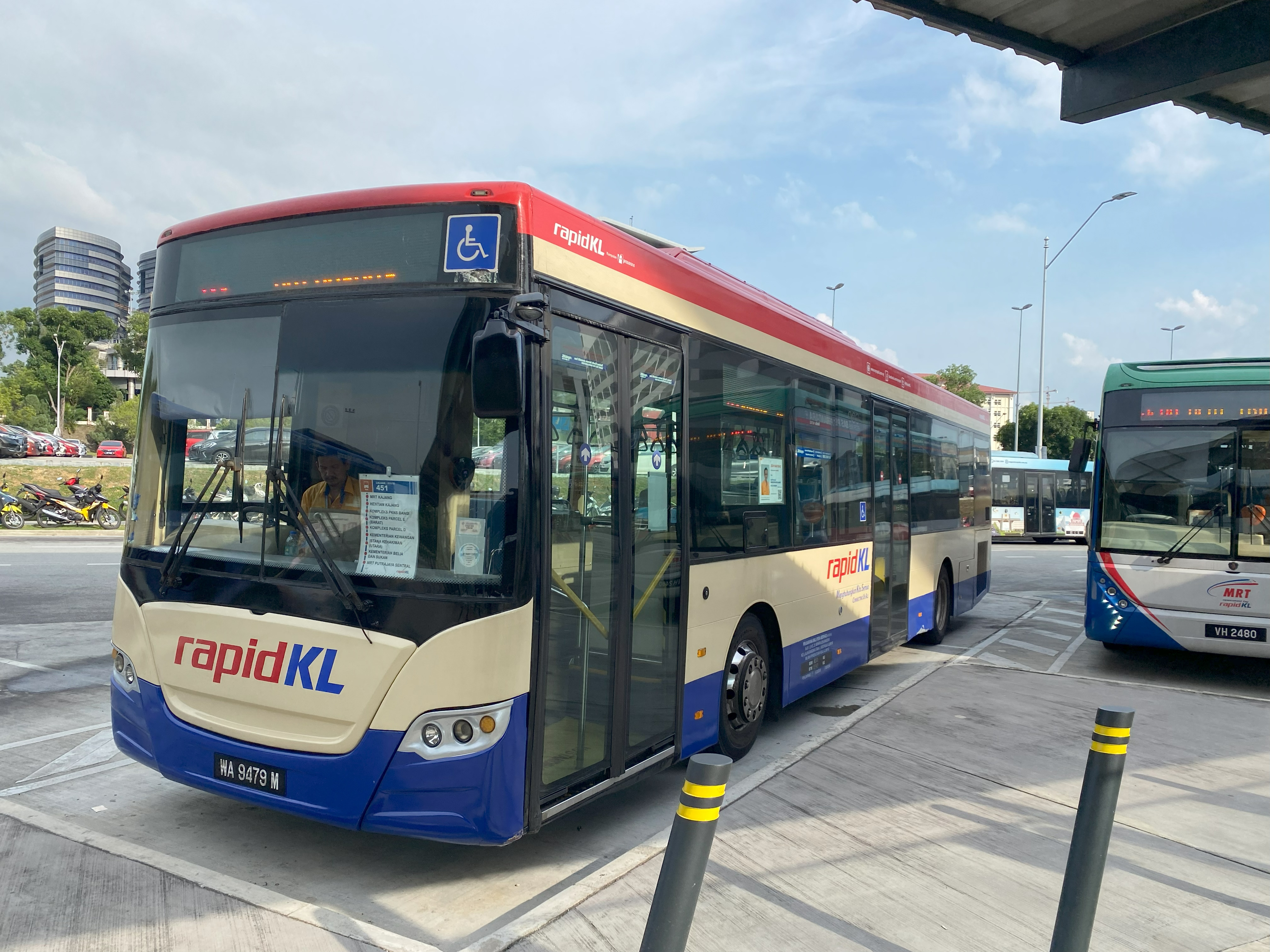
Rapid KL trial bus route 451 in MRT Putrajaya Sentral for the 5.00 pm trip towards MRT Kajang. This route has since been discontinued by Rapid Bus, citing low ridership, leaving sectors between Kajang & Putrajaya not directly connected with public transport. Passengers are required to interchange at Tun Razak Exchange or Bandar Tasik Selatan for journeys between Kajang and Putrajaya.

Platform	Route No.	Operator	Origin	Desitination	Via	Connected to	Terminated
3	T508	Rapid KL (MRT Feeder Bus)	KT3 PY41 Putrajaya Sentral	Presint 10	Jalan Merbuk P9; Jalan Gelam P9D; Jalan Tempua P9B; Lebuh Perdana Barat; Persiaran Seri Perdana; Jalan P11A; Jalan P11; Jalan Enggang P9	523, P102, P105, P107, P108	16 January 2026
5	T510	Rapid KL (MRT Feeder Bus)	KT3 PY41 Putrajaya Sentral	Presint 8	Lebuh Wawasan; Jalan P8; Ayer@8; Lebuh Perdana Barat; Jalan Enggang P9	P105	16 January 2026
7	T512	Rapid KL (MRT Feeder Bus)	KT3 PY41 Putrajaya Sentral	Presint 11	Jalan Enggang P9; Jalan P11; Jalan P11A	P102	16 January 2026
8	T513	Rapid KL (MRT Feeder Bus)	KT3 PY41 Putrajaya Sentral	Ministry of Transport, Presint 4	Jalan Enggang P9; Jalan Tempua P9B; Lebuh Perdana Barat; Persiaran Sultan Salahuddin Abdul Aziz Shah	523, T508, T509	31 July 2023
8	506	Rapid KL	KT3 PY41 Putrajaya Sentral	Central Park Avenue (Bandar Utama bus hub)	FT 29; Puchong Utama; Damansara–Puchong Expressway; SP25 Pusat Bandar Puchong; SP24 IOI Puchong Jaya/IOI Mall Puchong; KJ24 Kelana Jaya; Damansara Utama; KG09 SA01 Bandar Utama	780, 800, 801, 802, BET1, PJ05, PJ06	14 February 2026
9	451	Rapid KL	KB06 KG35 Kajang	KT3 PY41 Putrajaya Sentral	Hentian Kajang; Kompleks PKNS Bandar Baru Bangi; Nadi Presint 15; Persiaran Sultan Salahuddin Abdul Aziz Shah; Persiaran Perdana; Dataran Gemilang	450, T451, T461, T462, T463, T464	16 January 2026

== Gallery ==
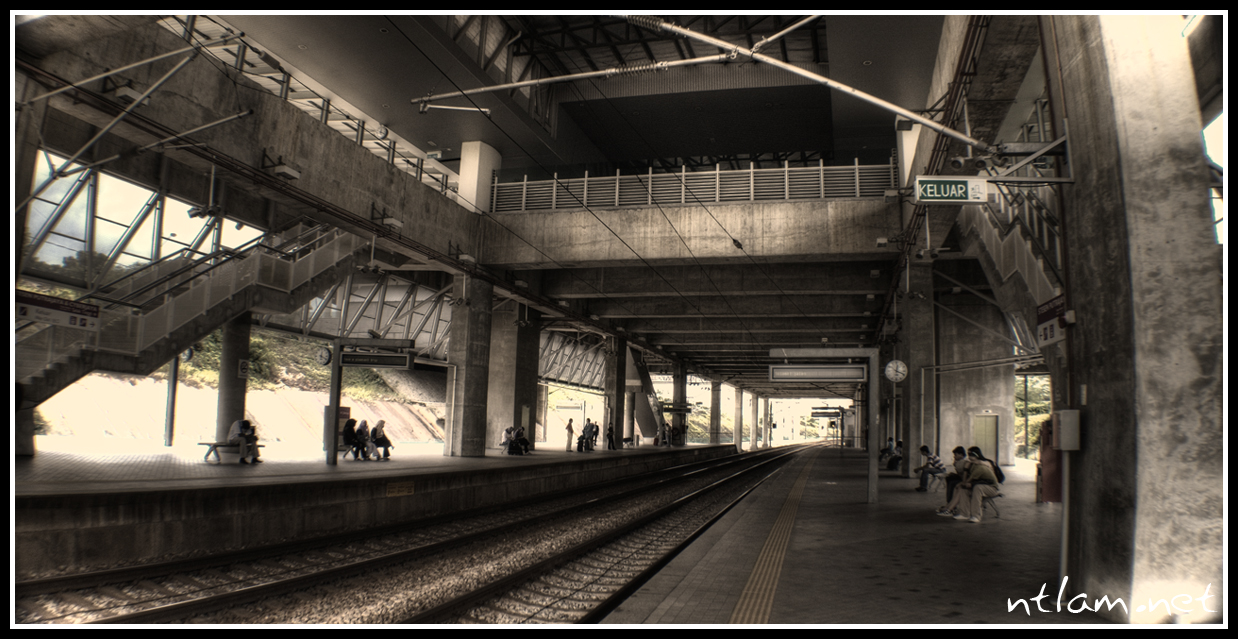
The side platforms of the KLIA Transit line

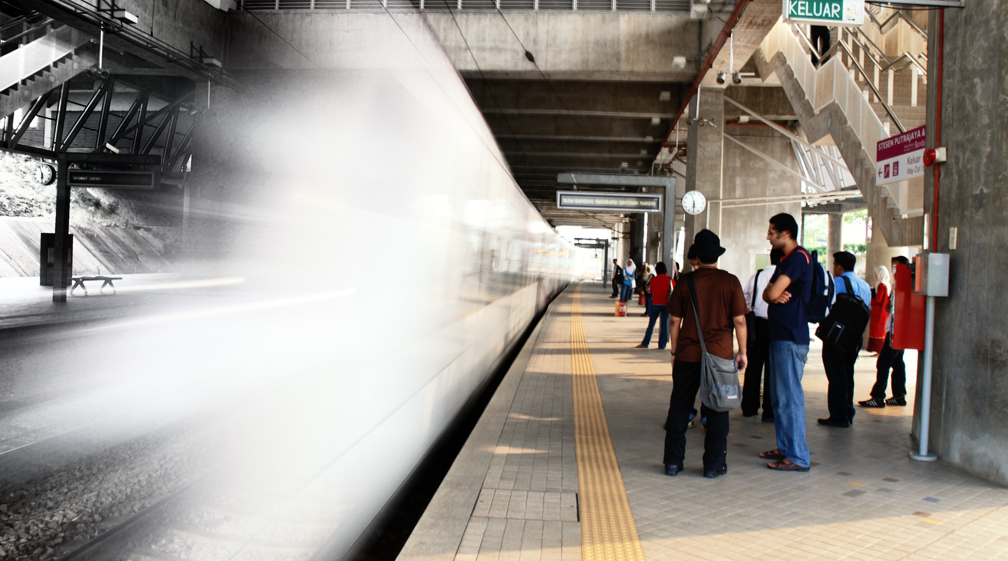
A KLIA Ekspres train passing through the station. Unlike the KLIA Transit, these trains do not stop here as they travel non-stop between KL Sentral and KLIA Terminals 1 and 2

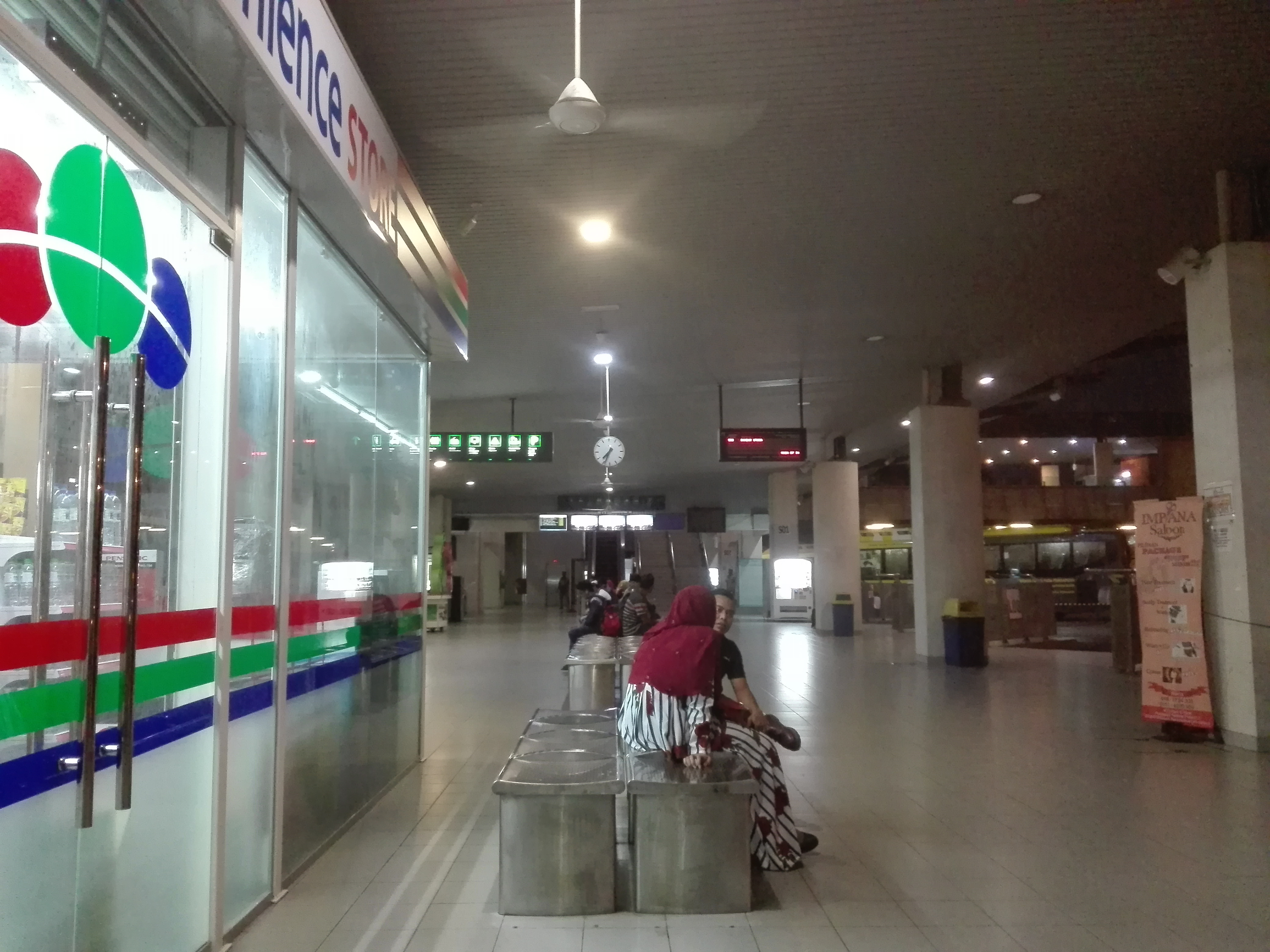
The bus platform at the station

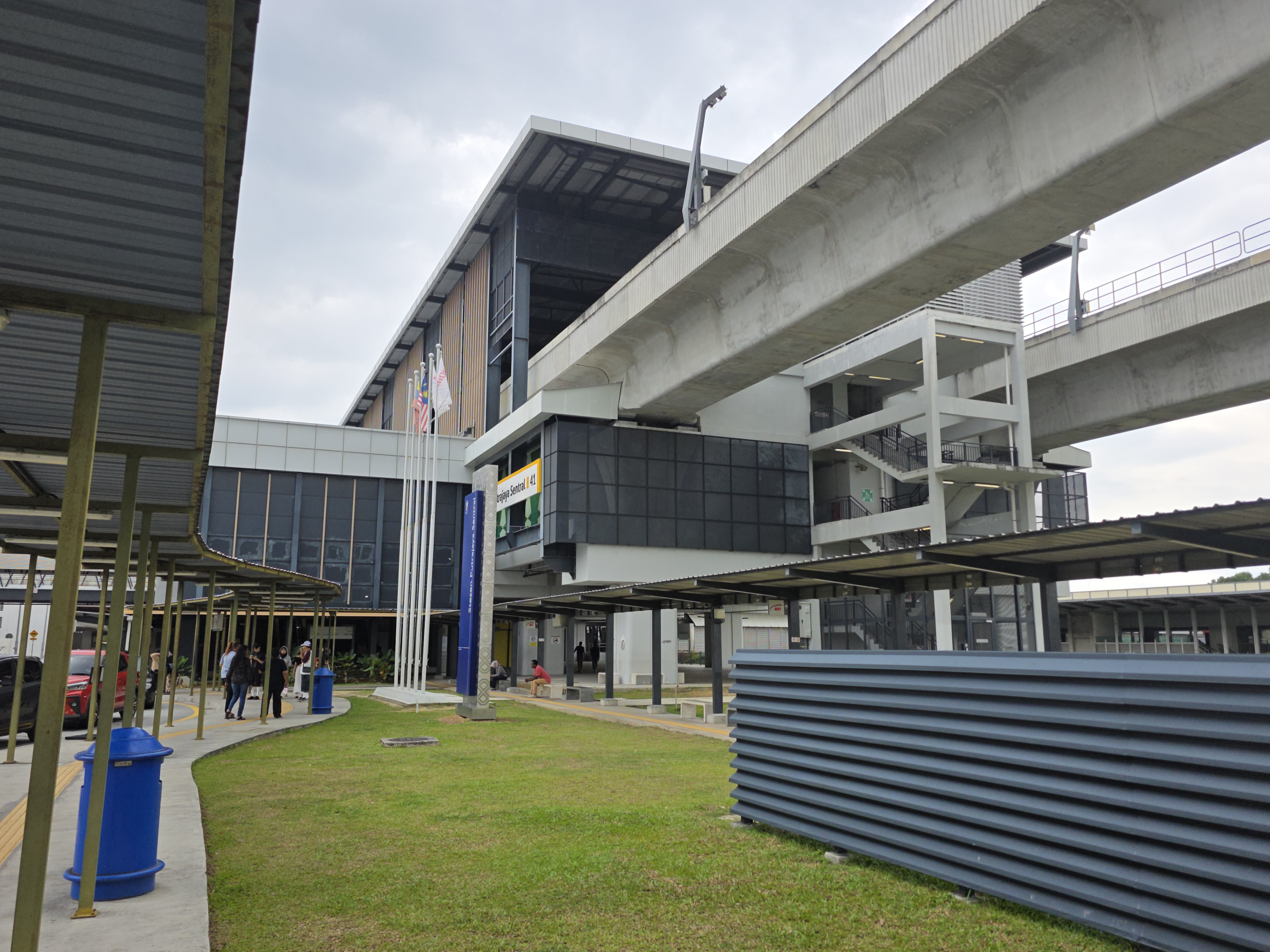
The exterior of the MRT station

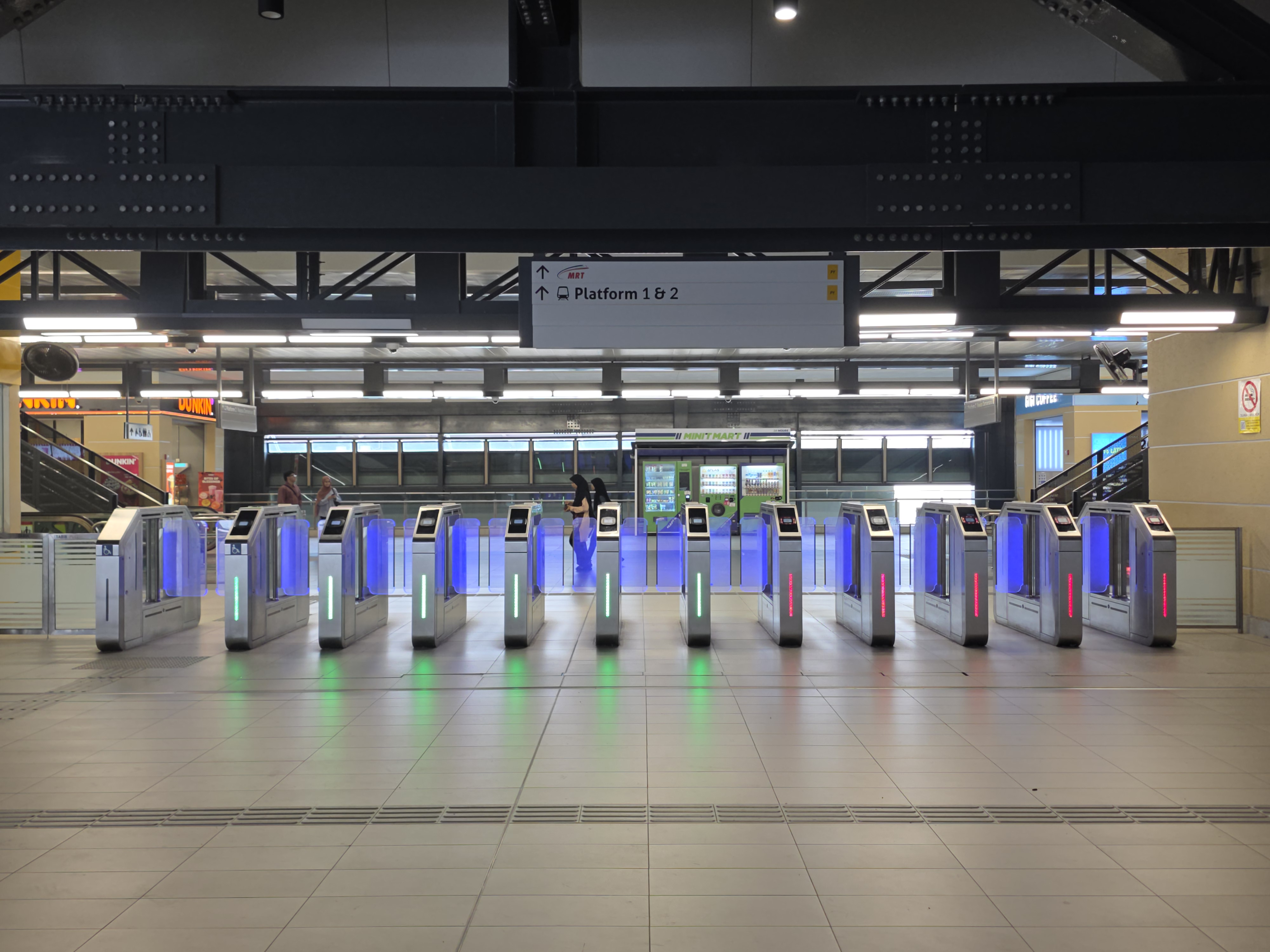
Faregates at concourse level of the MRT station

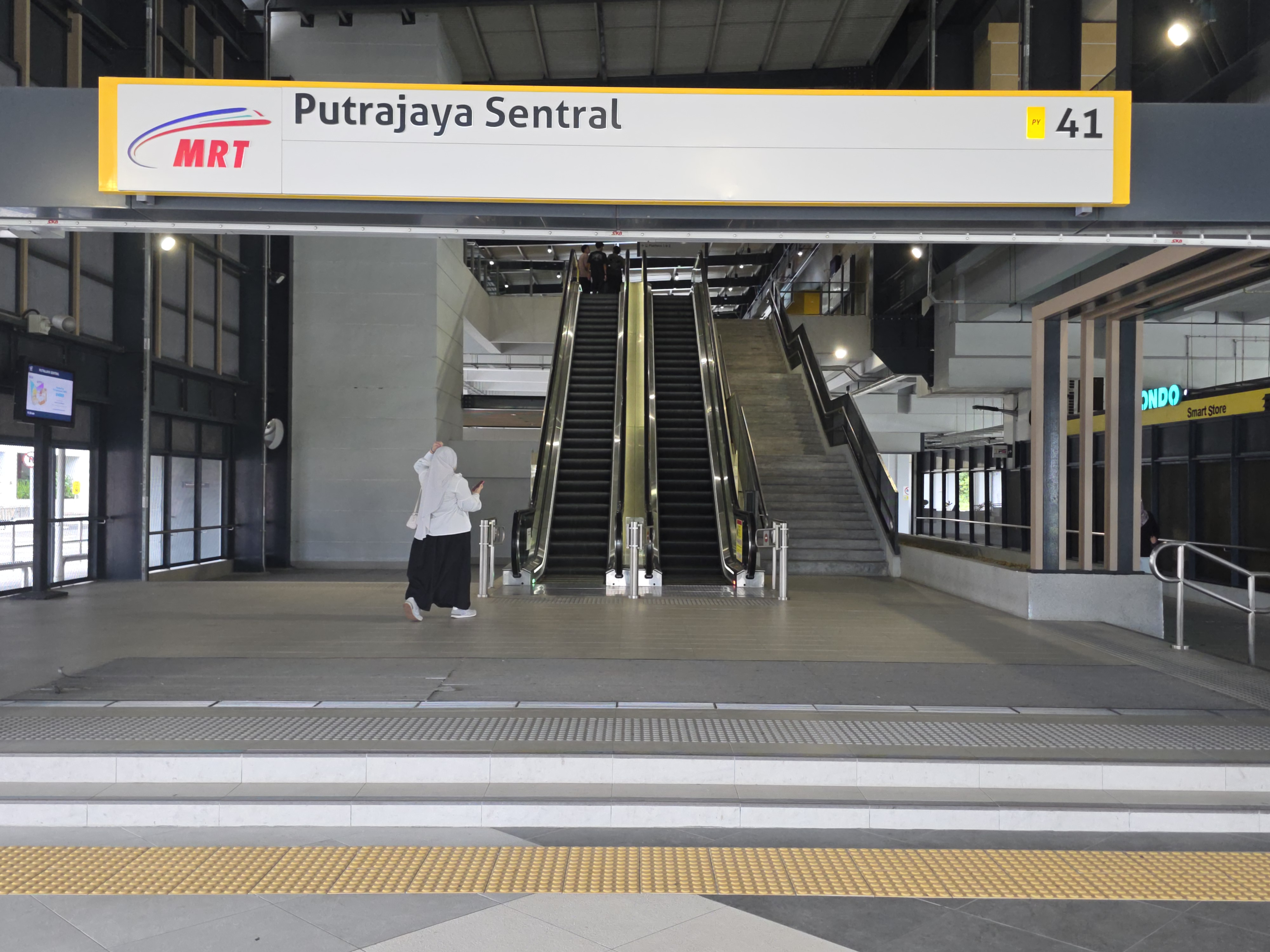
Entrance B of the MRT station

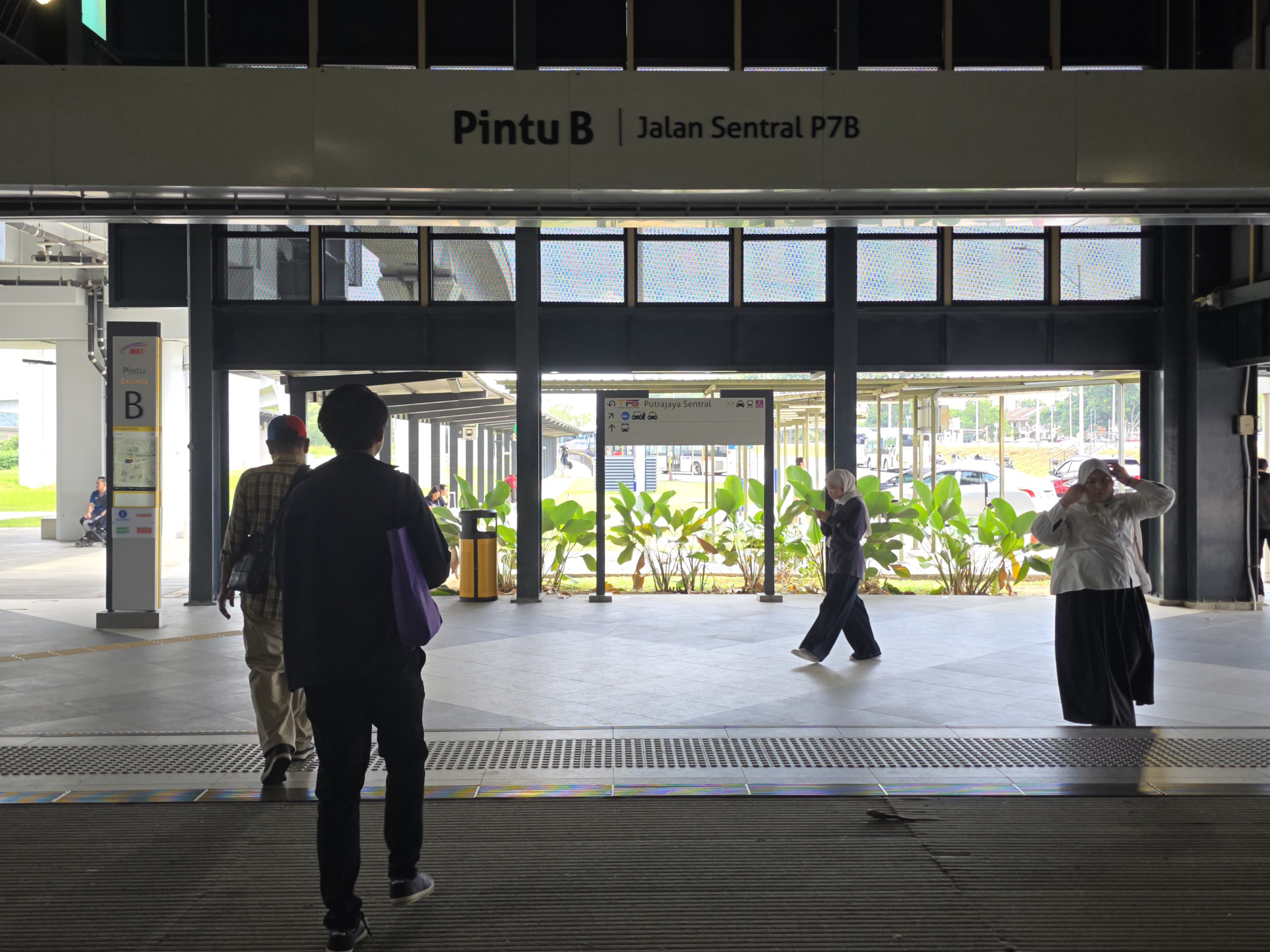
Entrance B of the MRT station, exiting on to Jalan Sentral P7B

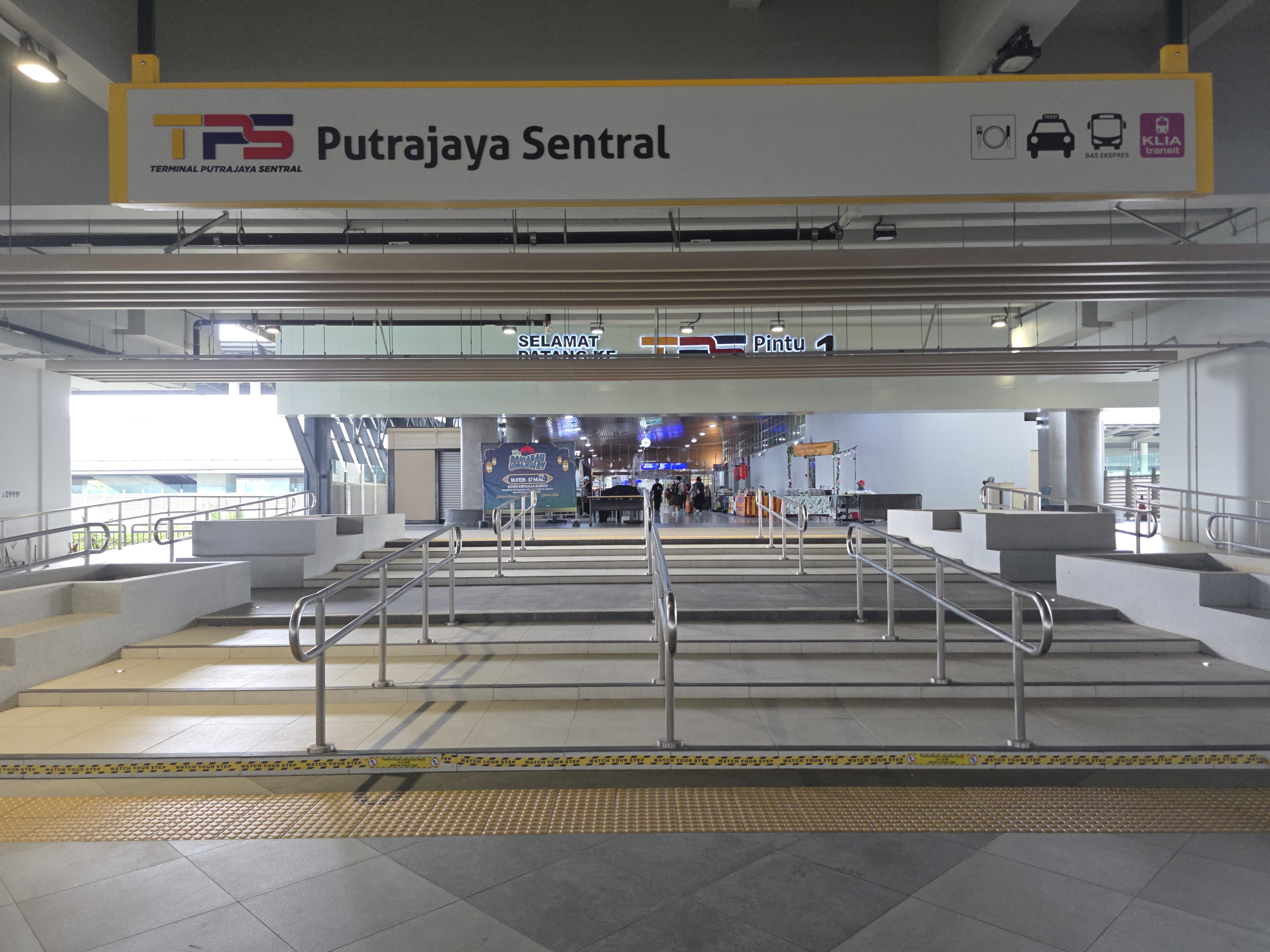
Pedestrian linkway between the main terminal building and the MRT station

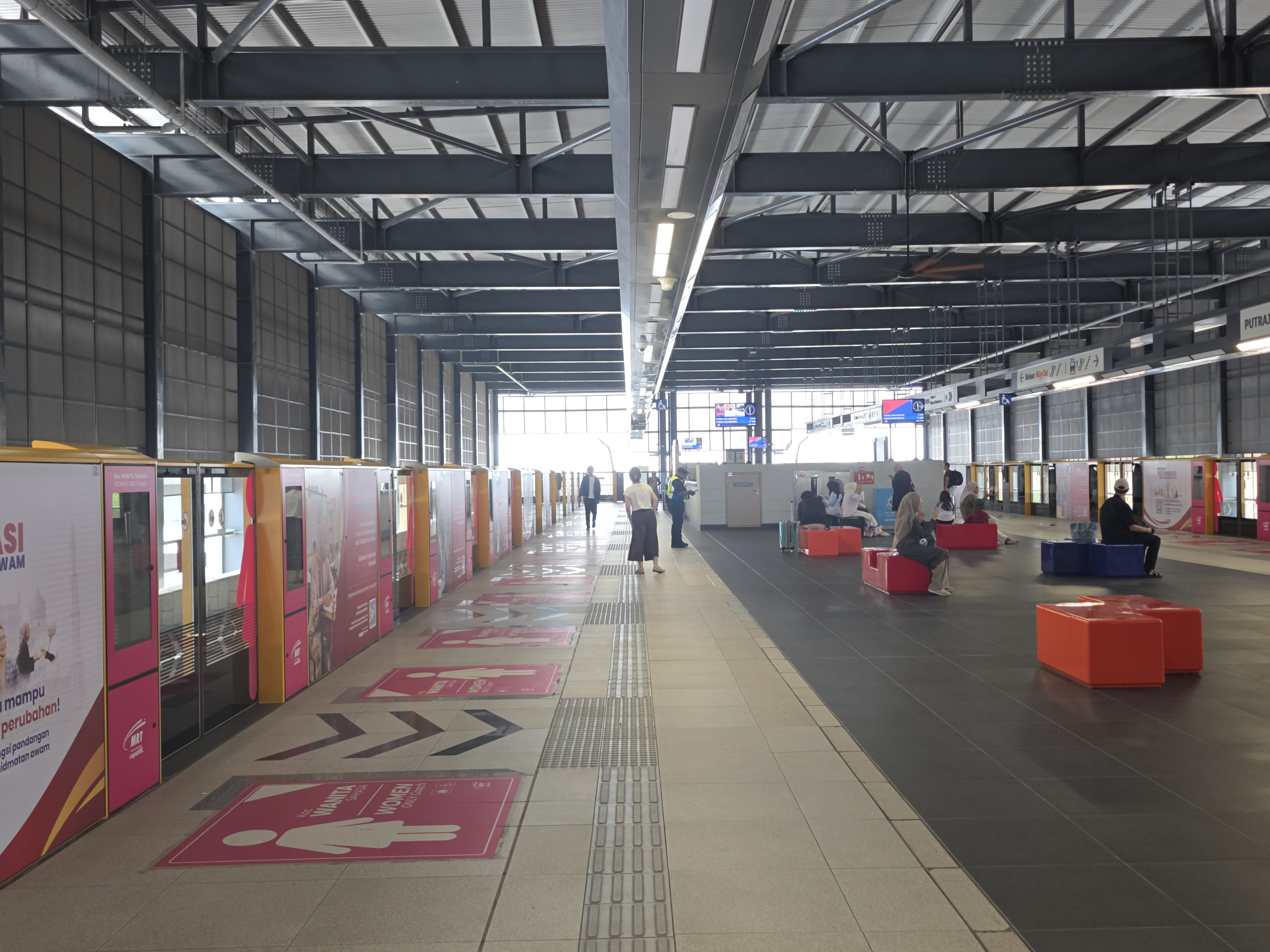
Platform level of the MRT station
