= Puchong Jaya =

Township in Puchong, Petaling District, Selangor, Malaysia

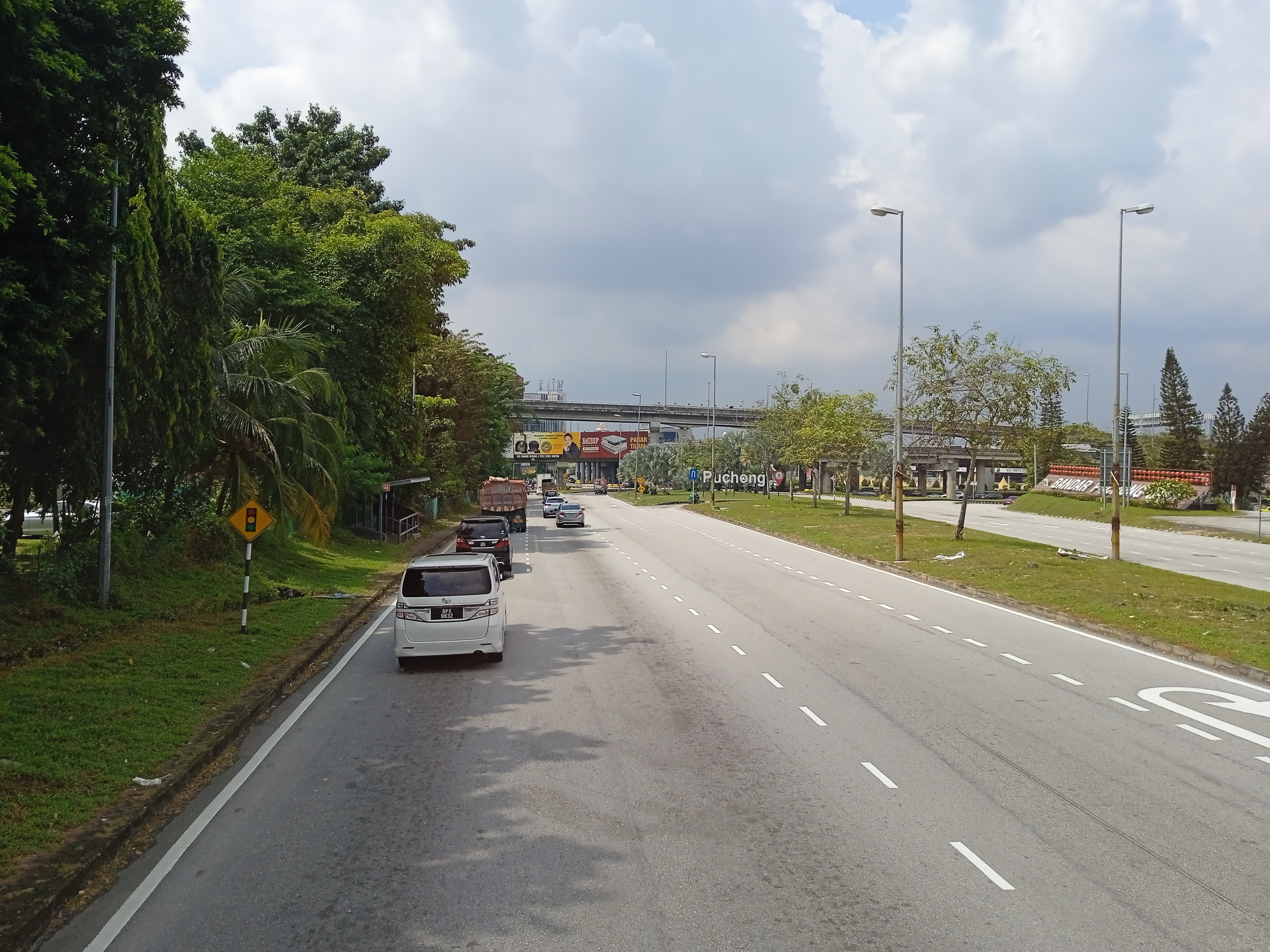
Puchong Jaya

Puchong Jaya in Petaling District

Puchong Jaya is a township in Puchong, Subang Jaya, Petaling District, Selangor, Malaysia. It is located between Bandar Sunway and Bandar Kinrara and was developed by IOI Group.

== Mall ==
- IOI Mall Puchong
