= Lotus's =

Retail chain in Thailand and Malaysia

- Formerly: Lotus Supercenter (1994–1998); Tesco Lotus Supercenter (1998–2000); Tesco Lotus (2000–2021)
- Industry: Food retailing
- Founded: 1994; 32 years ago (Lotus Supercenter); 1998; 28 years ago (Tesco Lotus Supercenter); 2000; 26 years ago (Tesco Lotus); 2021; 5 years ago (Lotus's)
- Headquarters: 629/1 Nawamin Road, Nuanchan Subdistrict, Bueng Kum District, Bangkok, Thailand
- Area served: Thailand and Malaysia
- Key people: Naris Thamkuekool, Group CEO; Sompong Rungnirattisai, CEO
- Products: Food items and daily products
- Owner: CP All
- Parent: CP Axtra
- Website: lotuss.com/en

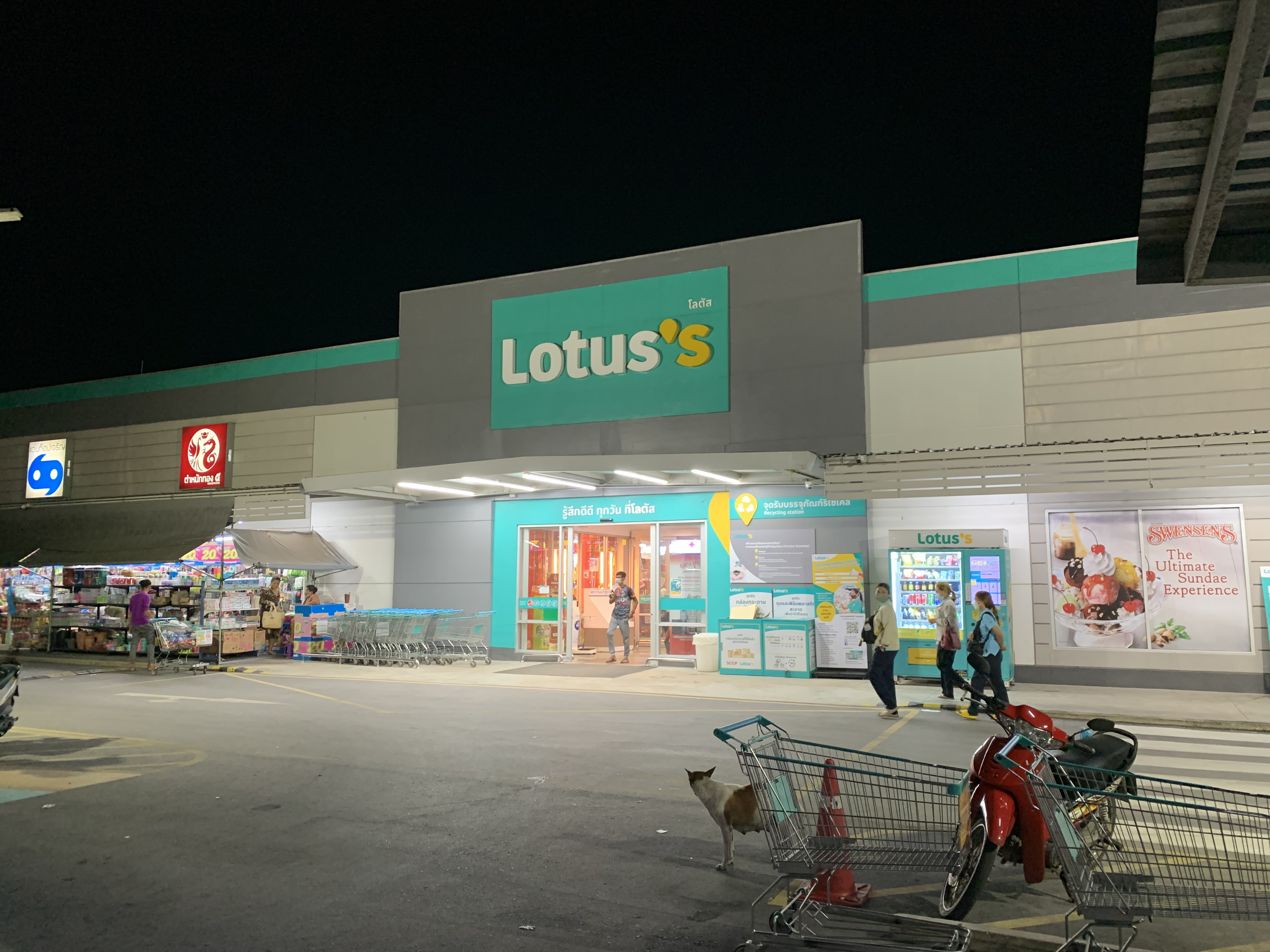
Lotus's in Ongkharak, Thailand

Lotus's (formerly known as Lotus Supercenter, Tesco Lotus Supercenter and Tesco Lotus) is a retail chain in Thailand founded and operated by Charoen Pokphand (CP) Group, with operations in Malaysia following the acquisition of Tesco Malaysia in 2020.

== Description ==
In 1994, the Charoen Pokphand (CP) Group established the Lotus Supercenter chain, opening its first outlet at Seacon Square. In 1998, British supermarket chain Tesco acquired a stake of the Lotus Supercenter chain to form "Tesco Lotus". CP Group sold most of its remaining shares of Tesco Lotus in 2003.

Tesco Lotus stores currently operate in five formats: Extra, Hypermarket, Department Store, Talad, and Express. Extra, Hypermarket, and Department store formats sell fresh food, prepared foods, and grocery offerings as well as a non-food offerings including electrical appliances, apparel, toys, stationery, and household goods. Talad ('market') is a "supermarket format" selling mainly groceries. Express is a convenience "mini-supermarket" format. Many of the products on the shelf are Tesco house brand products.

The bigger stores are often set in malls and have food courts and many other shops and stalls available as well as large car parks. Tesco Lotus also offers a range of retail and financial services including bill payment, personal loans (Tesco Premier), a Tesco Visa credit card, and a Tesco insurance broker. Most recently, in April 2013, Tesco Lotus introduced online shopping. As of early-2018, Tesco Lotus's total retail floor space stood at 1.4 million m^{2}. In August it opened store number 2,000 in Thailand. Its biggest competitor in the Thai market is Big C and Tops.

As of December 2019, Tesco Lotus had 1,967 stores in Thailand under the Tesco Lotus brand: 1,600 Tesco Lotus Express stores and about 400 other stores in hypermarket, Talad, and department store formats. Two hypermarkets opened in 2019, two more are being constructed, and 50 Tesco Lotus Express stores will open in the second-half of 2019.

=== Reacquisition by Charoen Pokphand and expansion to Malaysia ===
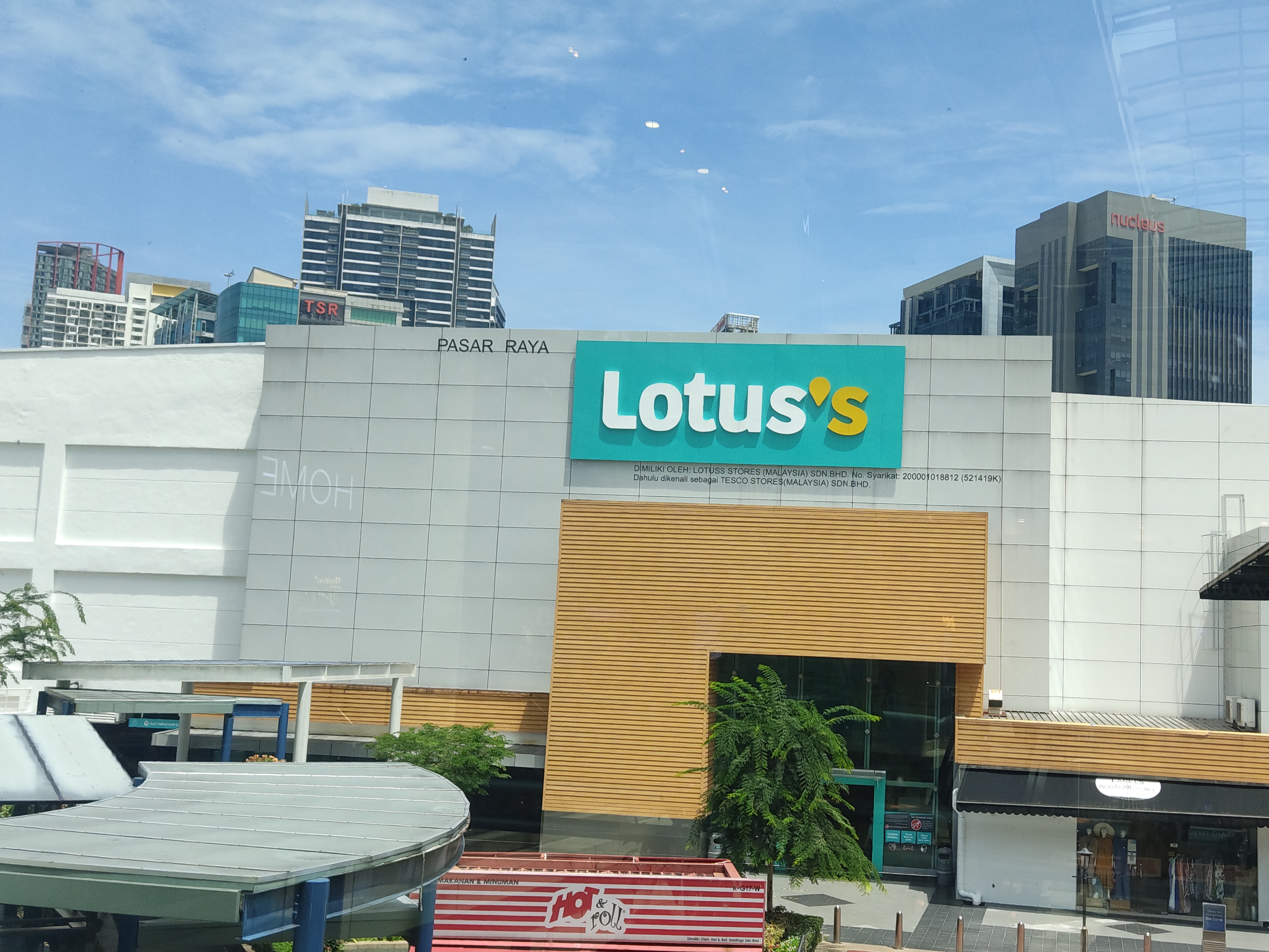
Lotus's in Mutiara Damansara, Malaysia in 2021

On 9 March 2020, CP Group submitted the winning bid to reacquire Tesco Lotus, in addition to Tesco operations in Malaysia, for about US$10 billion. The purchase needs the approval of Thailand's Trade Competition Commission as the new company could constitute a monopoly, given that CP Group already owns 7-Eleven convenience stores and the Makro cash-and-carry business. The sale was approved in Malaysia in November 2020 and in Thailand in December 2020, with the rebranding of the acquired stores beginning in February 2021, replacing the Tesco corporate branding with that of Lotus's. Through the Tesco acquisition in Malaysia, Lotus's operates 64 rebranded Tesco outlets in the country.

Lotus’s rebranded look branding is aimed at attracting younger shoppers. Its drop‑pin logo symbolises Lotus’s as a one‑stop destination, while the “S” stands for “smart,” representing an emphasis on sustainability, efficiency, and the use of technology.

== Corporate social responsibility ==
Tesco Lotus has operated the Tesco for Thais Foundation since 2003 which has presented over 27,000 scholarships to needy children around the country, and runs programs for undergraduates which include in-store training. The company is also part of a major reforestation program, "Plant 9 Million Trees", which completed its nine million trees target in 2013. In line with the rest of Tesco group, Tesco Lotus is pledged to reduce carbon emissions from its business operations and opened the first "Zero Carbon Store" in Asia at Bangpra, Chonburi in November 2011.

== Controversy ==
=== Libel lawsuit ===
In late-2007 and early-2008, Tesco Lotus sued three critics for libel. It lost the case against Jit Siratranont, former MP and now vice-general secretary of the Thai Chamber of Commerce, dropped the case against newspaper columnist Kamol Kamoltrakul on the grounds of his ill-health, and obtained a written apology from a newspaper business editor Nongnart Harnvilai.

=== Animal welfare concerns ===
The NGO World Animal Protection reported that Tesco Lotus uses sow stalls in their pork production process. The practice confines sows in cages no bigger than a refrigerator in order to use them as "breeding machines". Sow stalls have been banned in the UK since 1999 as well as in other jurisdictions. World Animal Protection succeeded in persuading Charoen Pokphand Foods, a major Thai pork producer, to get mother pigs out of cages in their Thai operations by 2025.

== Logo ==
1994-1998	1998-2000	2000-2008	2008-2021	2021-present
Lotus Supercenter	Tesco Lotus Supercenter	Tesco Lotus		Lotus's
