= IOI Mall Puchong =

Shopping mall in Puchong, Selangor, Malaysia

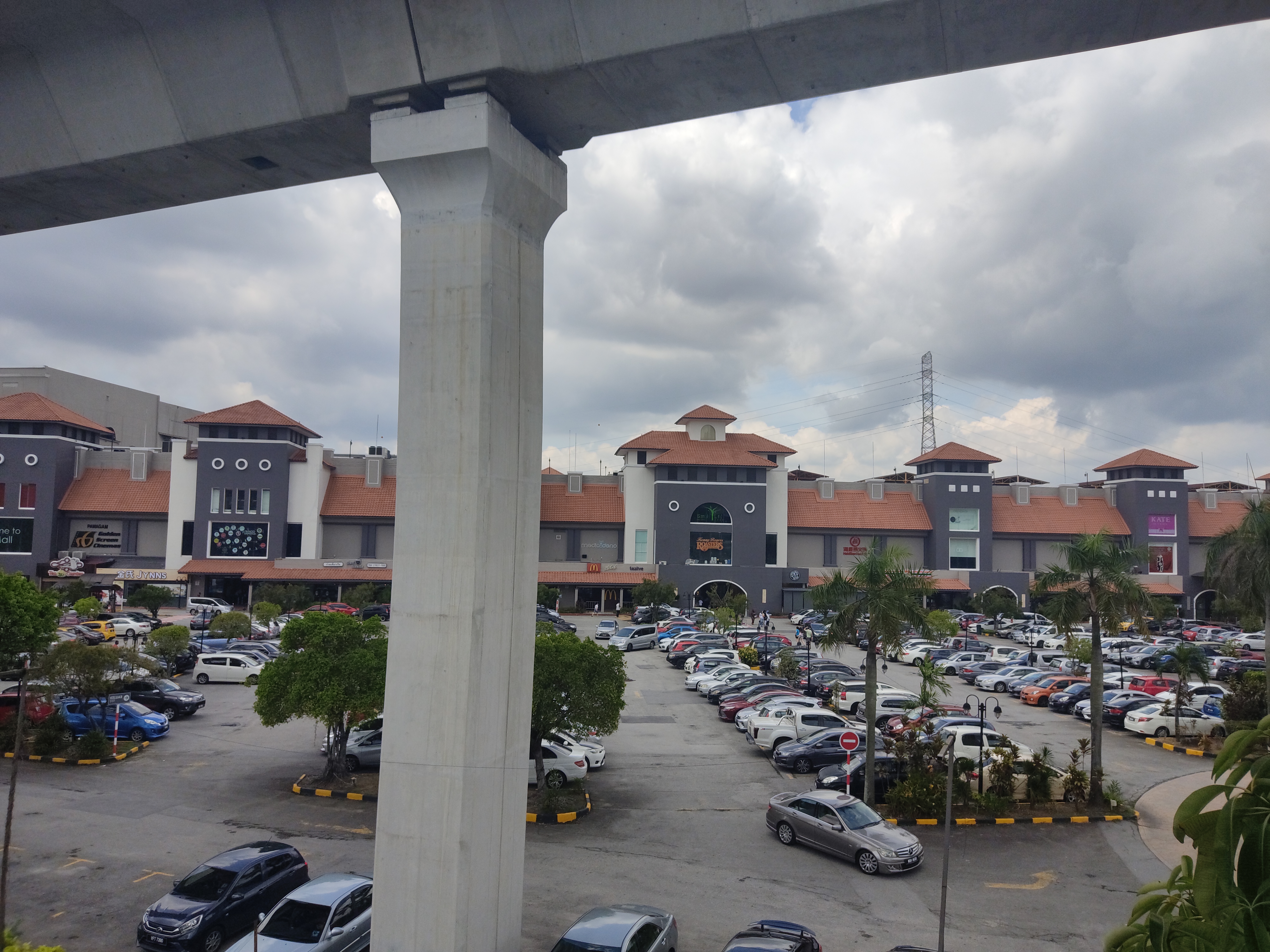
- IOI Mall Puchong from LRT station
- Location: Puchong, Selangor
- Coordinates: 3°02′44.3″N 101°37′05.6″E
- Address: Jalan Puchong, Bandar Puchong Jaya, 47170 Puchong, Selangor, Malaysia
- Opened: 1996
- Developer: IOI Properties Group
- Num. of stores: 150+
- Num. of anchor tenants: AEON, Golden Screen Cinemas, Popular, Toys R Us, Brands Outlet, PADINI Concept Store, Trio, Old Navy, UNIQLO, DeFacto, The Port Family Karaoke, Mr D.I.Y, Kaison
- Floors: 4
- Website: www.ioimp.com.my

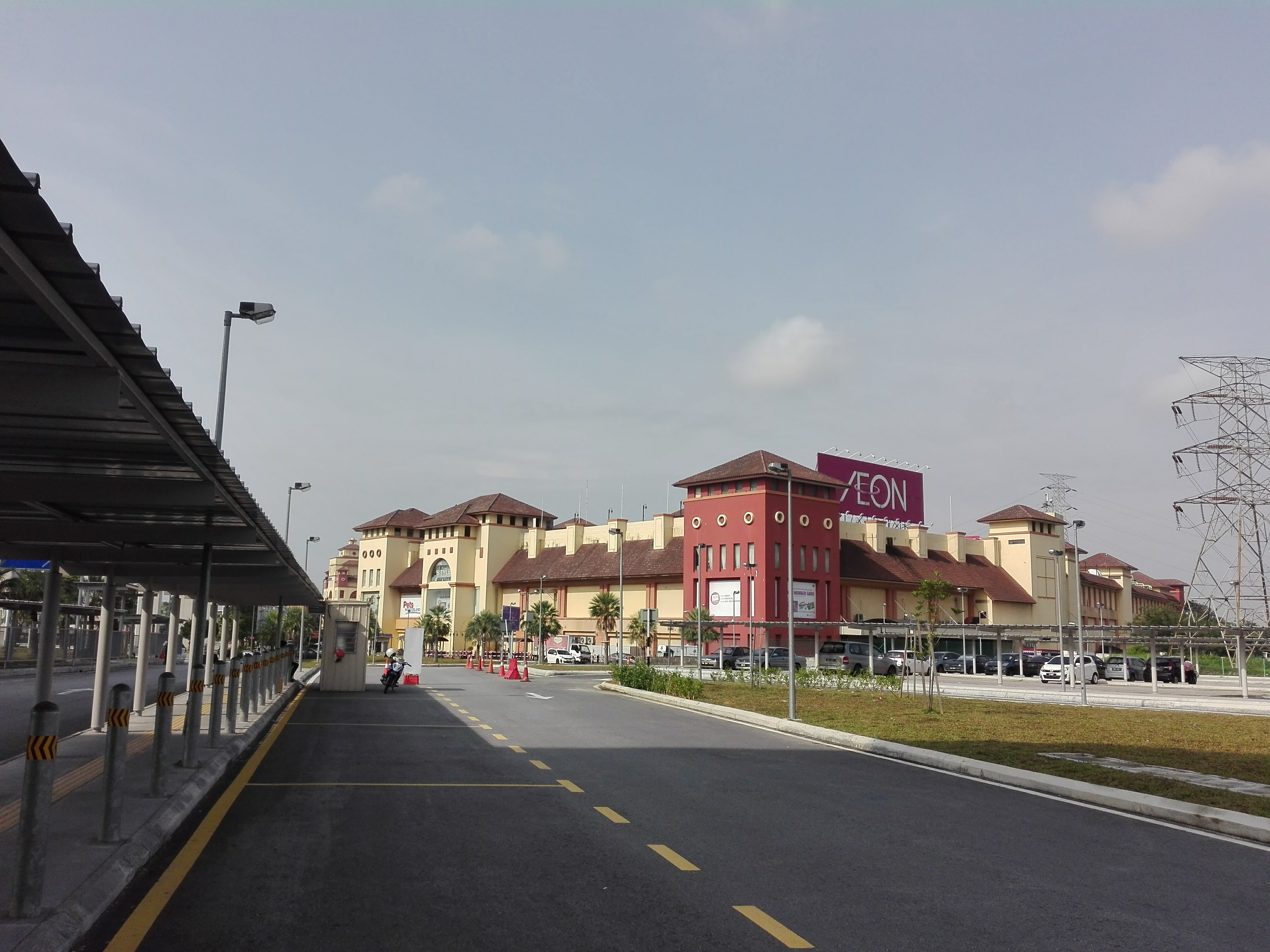
The iOi Mall Puchong seen from the nearby LRT station.

IOI Mall Puchong is a shopping mall in the northern part of Puchong. It is near Shah Alam, Putrajaya, Sunway, and Subang and connected to several major expressways such as Kesas and Lebuhraya Damansara Puchong. IOI Mall Puchong features Mediterranean architecture and includes four levels of shops, over 3,000 parking bays, and a million-dollar carousel acquired from the United States.

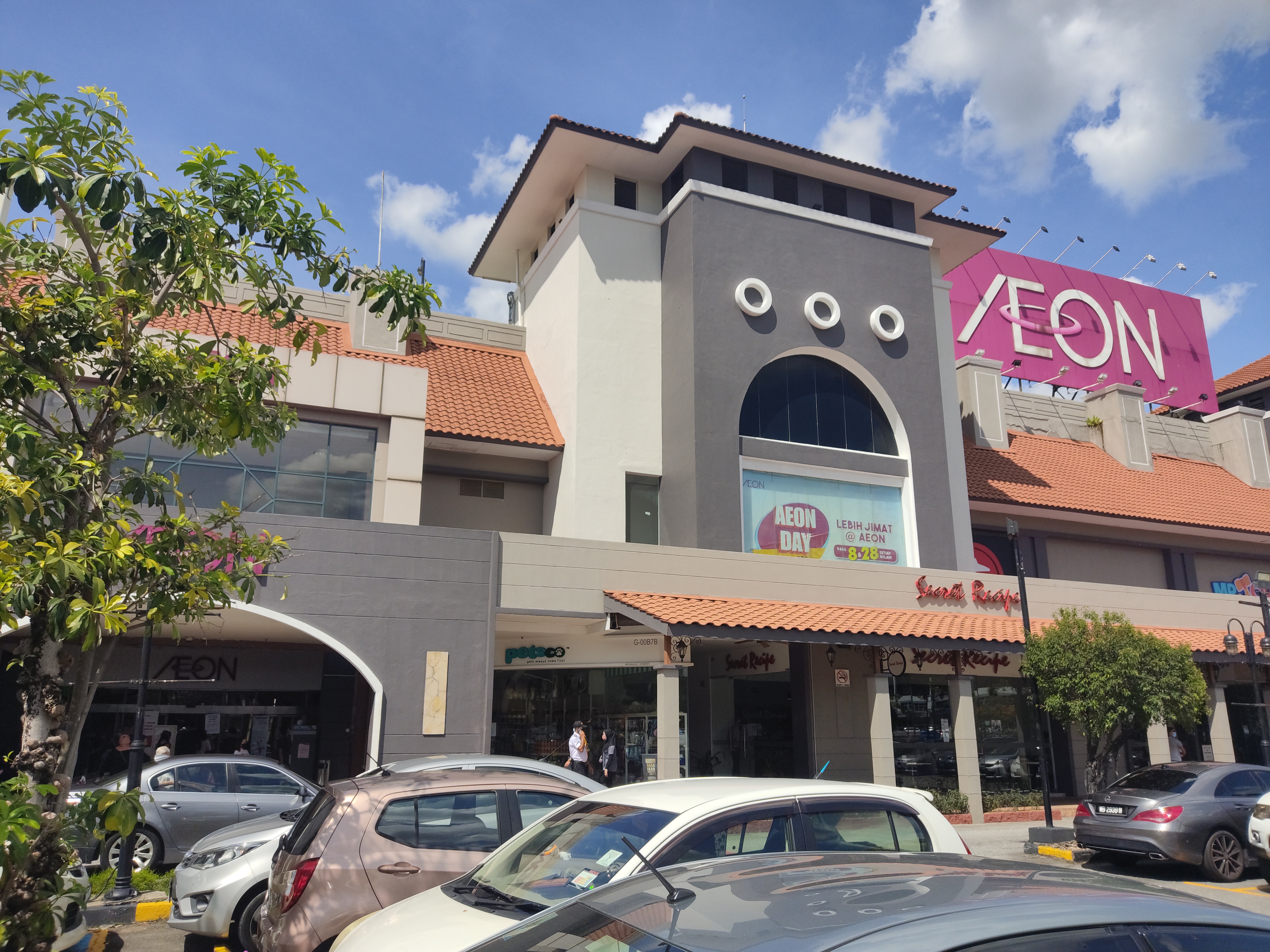
AEON Bandar Puchong located in north court of the mall

== Events ==
StarMetro Slam Dunk Competition and the AND1 Streetball Challenge were held in IOI Mall Puchong in June 2015. The slam dunk competition was one of the side show events that added to the thrill of the annual AND1 basketball challenge.

Gintell De'Wise Care Butterfly Massage Chair and Gintell De'Vano S FUNtastic Sofa were introduced in IOI Mall Puchong. Gintell brand ambassadors Datuk Jalaluddin Hassan and Amber Chia were also present at the launch here during Gintell's health fair.

On 9 February 2017, IOI Mall Puchong invited special guests to celebrate Chinese New Year, including 40 underprivileged children from Kampung Broga Semenyih, Kampung Baru Semenyih and Kampung Cempaka. Twenty senior citizens from the Kim Loo Ting Temple were also present to enjoy performances performed by Kun Seng Keng Kuala Lumpur, which includes a lion dance extravaganza, a dragon dance and a prosperity drum performance. The mall also gave away necessities and red packets to the old folks, children's homes and poor families, before treating them to a Chinese New Year spread at the Dynasty Dragon Restaurant that evening.

== Flash floods ==
In February 2013, continuous heavy rain at Pusat Bandar Puchong has resulted in flash floods with water levels rising to as high as 1.5 metres, stretching from IOI mall to Bandar Puteri and had caused massive traffic jams in the area.

In June 2015, the mall was not spared by the flash flood which hit the Damansara-Puchong Highway (LDP) along the IOI Puchong stretch due to heavy rain in Klang Valley.

On 15 November 2016, the mall was yet again victim to another flash flood which triggered a massive jam. The flood last about an hour and subsided at 5pm when the rain eventually stopped.

On 16 December 2023, the mall was yet again victim to another flash flood where it overflows the ground floor and North Court parking lot of the mall in addition to nearby Damansara-Puchong Highway (LDP) due to evening heavy rain in which MBSJ's flood alert system reached 3.156 meters on 6.55pm.

== Public transport ==
SP24 IOI Puchong Jaya LRT Station on the 4 Sri Petaling Line serves the mall, while the bus stop near the new wing is served by several bus routes including 506, 600, 601, 602, SJ02, T600 and T604.

== See also ==
- IOI City Mall
