= Sultan Abdul Aziz Shah Airport Highway =

Road in Malaysia

Federal Route 15
- Sultan Abdul Aziz Shah Airport Road

Route information
- Maintained by Malaysian Public Works Department
- Length: 5.7 km (3.5 mi)
- Existed: 1963–present
- History: Completed in 1965

Major junctions
- North end: Subang North
- FT 15 Federal Route 15; FT 287 Jalan Subang–Batu Tiga; Damansara–Shah Alam Elevated Expressway New Klang Valley Expressway / AH2 / AH141; FT 3213 Federal Route 3213; FT 2 Federal Highway; FT 15 Subang-Kelana Jaya Link
- South end: Subang-Federal Highway Interchange; FT 2 Federal Highway

Location
- Country: Malaysia
- Primary destinations: Sultan Abdul Aziz Shah Airport, Subang, Ara Damansara, Kelana Jaya, Subang Jaya

Highway system
- Highways in Malaysia; Expressways; Federal; State

Sultan Abdul Aziz Shah Airport Road/Sultan Abdul Aziz Shah Airport Highway or Federal Route 15 is a major highway in Selangor, Malaysia that links the FT2 Federal Highway and Sungai Buloh towards the Sultan Abdul Aziz Shah Airport.

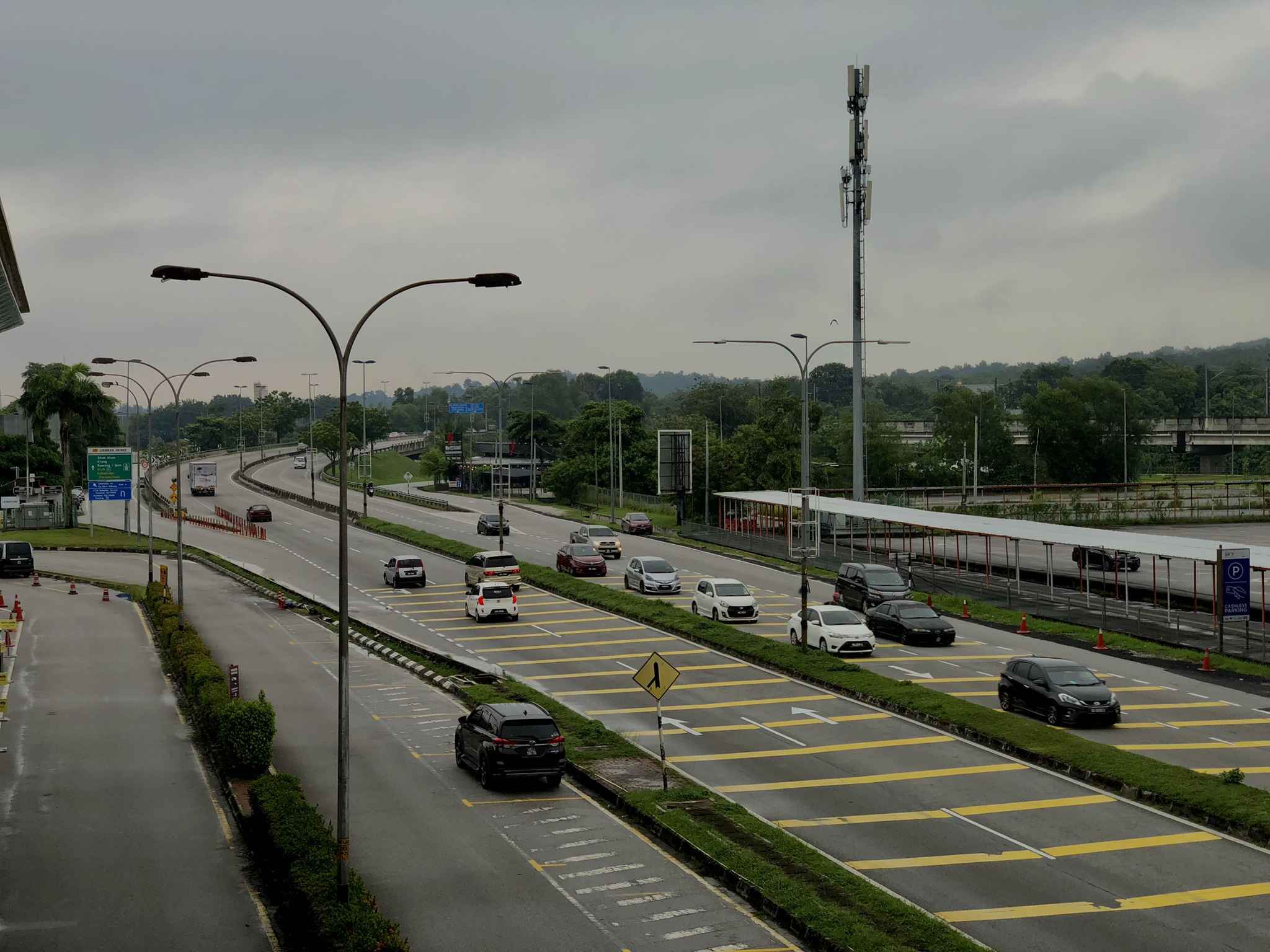
Subang Airport Road going through the SkyPark Terminal heading towards Sungai Buloh.

Subang Airport Road going through the SkyPark Terminal heading towards Ara Damansara and FT 2 Federal Highway.

== Junction lists ==
The entire route is located in Petaling District, Selangor.

Legend:

- I/C - Interchange, I/S - Intersection, RSA - Rest and service area, OBR - Overhead bridge restaurant, R/R - Restaurant and rest plaza, L/B - Layby, V/P - Vista point, TN - tunnel, T/P - Toll plaza, BR - Bridge
- C - Cloverleaf, S - Stack, T-A - Trumpet-A, T-B - Trumpet-B, DT - Directional-T/Y, SDT - Semi-Directional-T/Y, P-Y - Partial-Y, D - Diamond, P-C - Partial cloverleaf, D-D - Diverging diamond, D-R - Direct ramp

Location	km	mi	Exit	Name	Destinations	Notes
Subang North			Through to FT 15 Malaysia Federal Route 15			
Subang North				Subang North	FT 287 Jalan Subang–Batu Tiga – Bukit Subang, Batu Tiga, Shah Alam	T-junctions
Subang North				Subang Airport-DASH I/C	Damansara–Shah Alam Elevated Expressway; Damansara–Puchong Expressway – Kepong, Sungai Buloh, Bandar Sri Damansara, Petaling Jaya, Puchong, Putrajaya, Cyberjaya, Sungai Besi	Exit to Damansara
Subang North				Jalan Lama Lapangan Terbang Subang	FT 233 Jalan Lama Lapangan Terbang Subang – Subang Town Centre, Kampung Baru Subang, TUDM Subang	T-junctions
Subang Skypark			Sungai Damansara Bridge			
Subang Skypark				Jalan Lama Lapangan Terbang Subang	FT 233 Jalan Lama Lapangan Terbang Subang – Subang Town Centre, Kampung Baru Subang, TUDM Subang	T-junctions
Subang Skypark				Subang Skypark	Subang Skypark (Terminal 3) –	
Subang Skypark				Subang Skypark	Subang Skypark (Terminal 3) – Terminal Skypark Komuter station KTM Komuter	
Subang Skypark				Subang Skypark	Subang Skypark (Terminal 3) – Arrival/Departure	
Subang Skypark			Sungai Damansara bridge			
Subang Skypark				Malaysia Airports training centre		
Subang Skypark				LTSAAS control tower		
Subang Skypark				MAS Complex		
Subang Skypark			Airport runway bridge Maximum height limit: 4.5 m			
Subang Skypark				Subang Auction Centre	Subang Auction Centre	FHR2 bound
Subang Skypark			Abandoned T-junctions			
Subang Skypark			1506	LTSAAS Roundabout	Subang Airport Mosque (LTSAAS Mosque), Cargo Complex, National Shooting Range, Subang	Roundabout
Subang Skypark			Petronas L/B – Petronas, Perodua Service Centre, Telecom Exchange Building (FHR2 bound)			
Subang Skypark				Tank farm	Tank farm	LTSAAS bound
Subang Skypark			Sungai Damansara bridge			
Subang Jaya			BH Petrol L/B (LTSAAS bound)			
Subang Jaya			1505	Saujana I/C	Jalan PJU 1A/1 – Ara Damansara, Rapid KL Depot Lembah Subang; Persiaran Golf – Saujana, Saujana Golf and Country Club, Japanese School of Kuala Lumpur	Diamond interchange
Subang Jaya				Citta Mall	Citta Mall	FHR2 bound
Subang Jaya				Ara Damansara LRT station	P&R Ara Damansara LRT station 5	FHR2 bound
Subang Jaya			1504	Subang-NKVE I/C	Persada PLUS (PLUS Expressways main headquarters) New Klang Valley Expressway / AH2 / AH141 – Ipoh, Kuala Lumpur, Damansara, Klang, Kuala Lumpur International Airport (KLIA), Johor Bahru	Trumpet interchange
Subang Jaya			1503	Glenmarie Exit	FT 3213 Persiaran Kerjaya – Glenmarie, Shah Alam	LTSAAS bound
Subang Jaya				Glenmarie LRT Station	P&R Glenmarie LRT Station 5	
Subang Jaya			1502	Jalan SS 7/1 Exit	Jalan SS 7/1 – SS 7, Petaling Jaya Stadium, Kelana Business Centre	FHR2 bound
Subang Jaya				Subang Kelana Jaya Link Entry-exit	FT 15 Subang-Kelana Jaya Link – Subang Jaya (SS12 to SS19), UEP Subang Jaya, Putra Heights	From/To LTSAAS only
Subang Jaya	0.0	0.0	1501	Subang-Federal Highway I/C	FT 2 Federal Highway – Klang, Shah Alam, Petaling Jaya, Kuala Lumpur	Interchange
1.000 mi = 1.609 km; 1.000 km = 0.621 mi: Closed/former; Concurrency terminus; Incomplete access

== Gallery ==
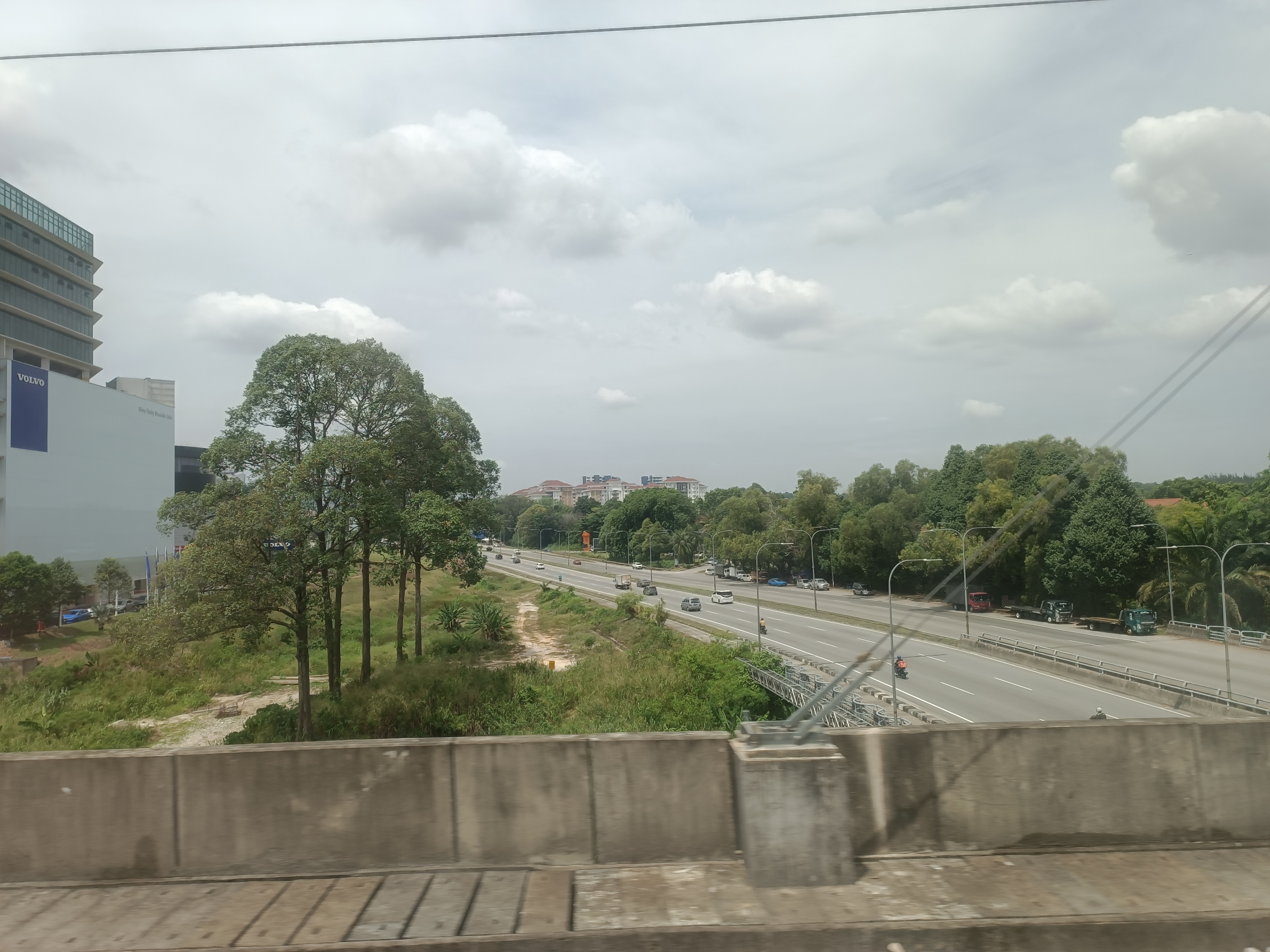
Subang Airport Road seen from the 10 Skypark Link train route.

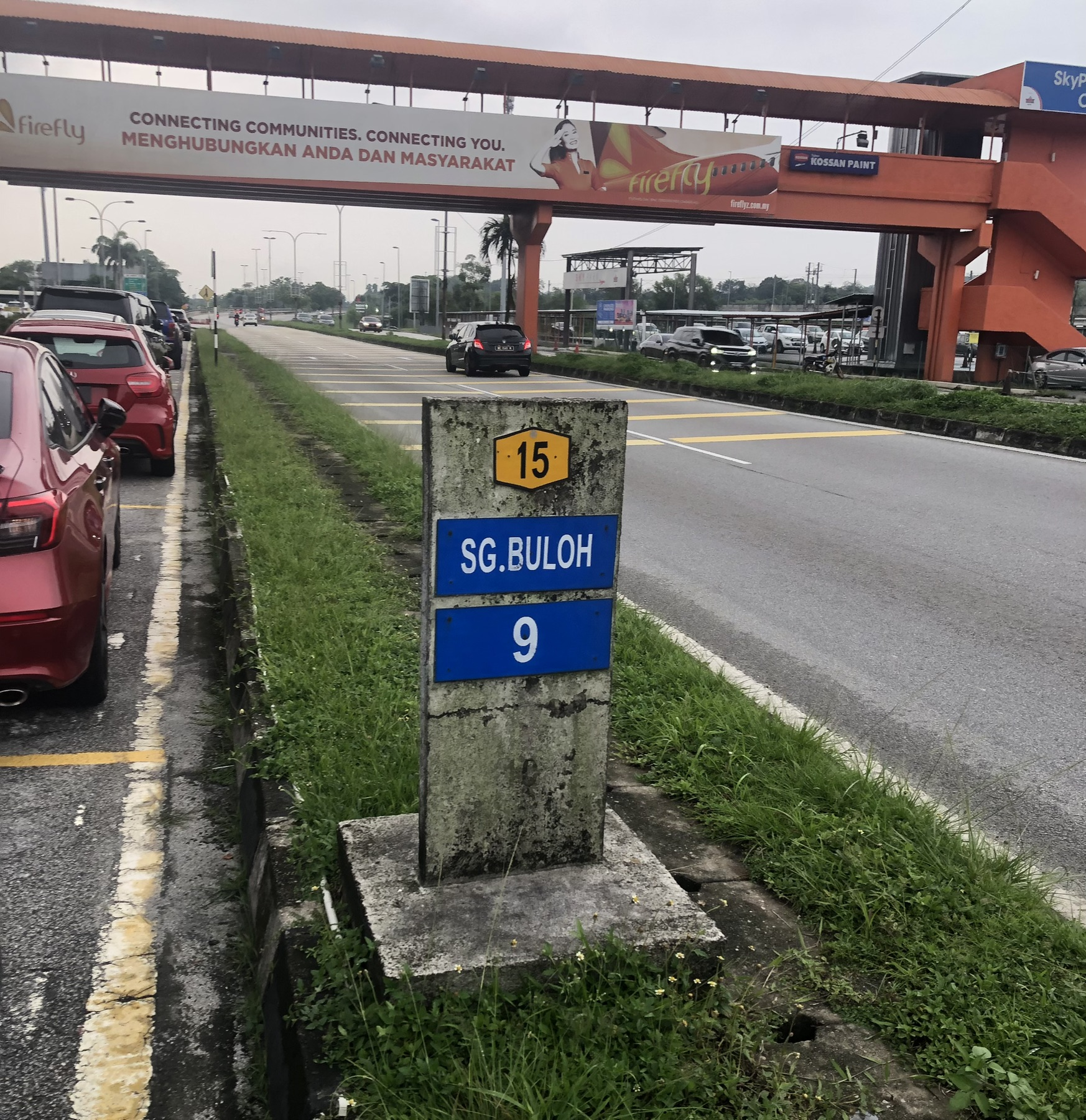
An old-style kilometre marker stone at the SkyPark Terminal with 9 kilometres towards Sungai Buloh.

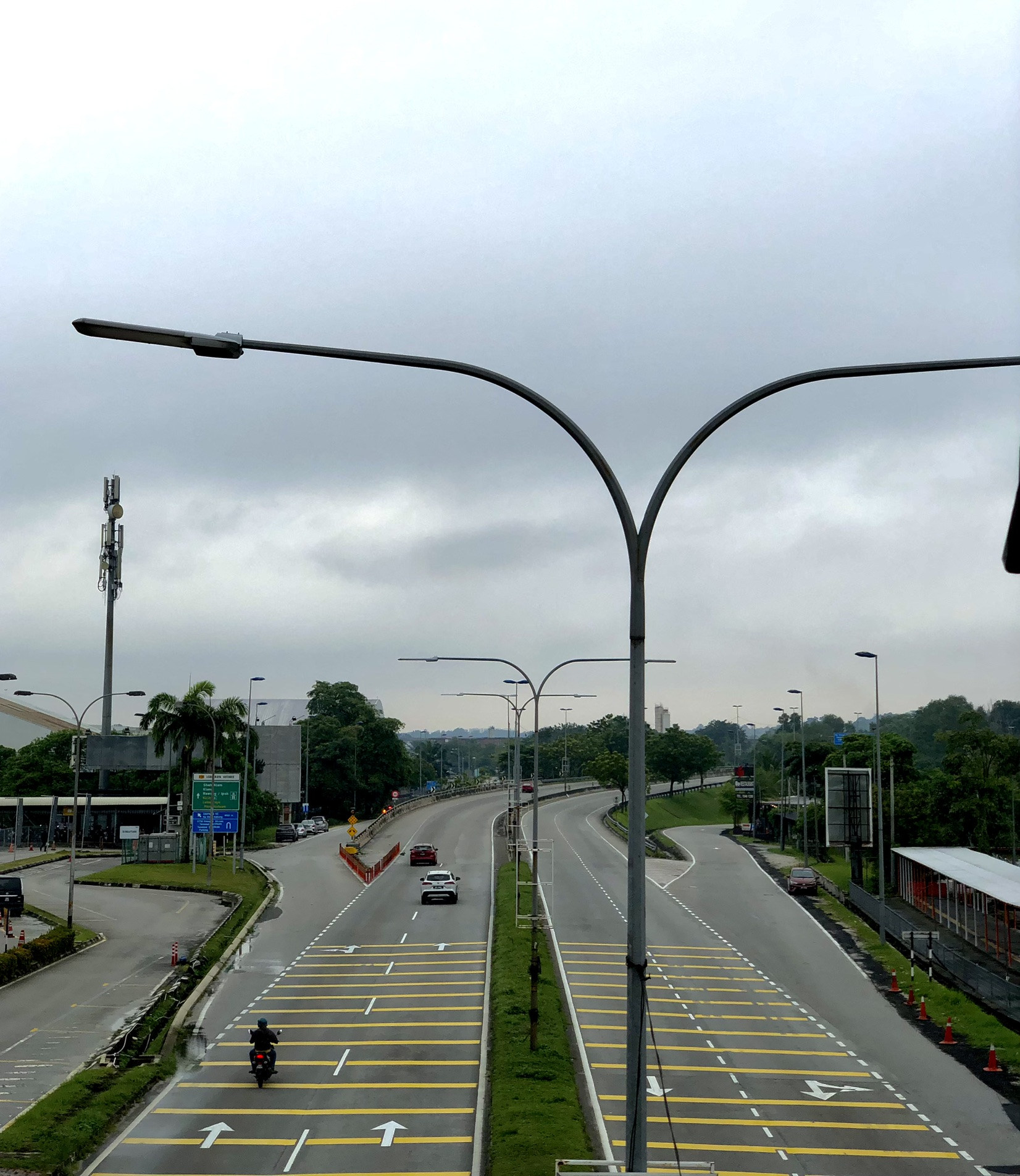
Subang Airport Road towards the Damansara River bridge heading towards Sungai Buloh.
