= Lembah Subang LRT station =

Light rapid transit station in Petaling Jaya, Selangor, Malaysia

KJ25 Lembah Subang
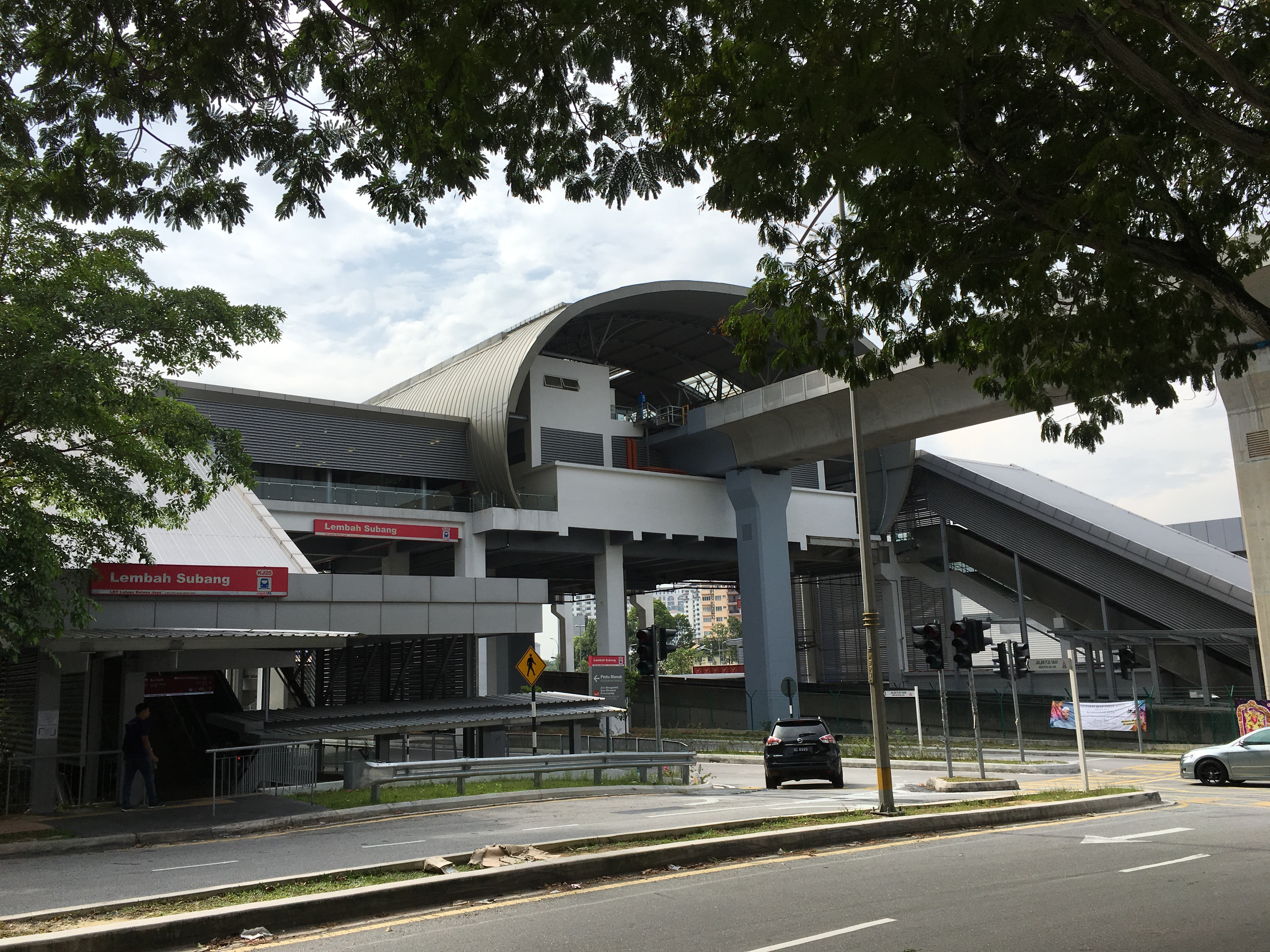
- Exterior view of the station

General information
- Other names: Malay: لمبه سوبڠ (Jawi); Chinese: 梳邦谷; Tamil: லெம்பா சுபாங்
- Location: Jalan PJU 1A/46, Ara Damansara, PJU 1A, 47301 Petaling Jaya; Selangor; Malaysia
- Coordinates: 3.1121°N 101.5912°E
- System: Rapid KL
- Owner: Prasarana Malaysia
- Operator: Rapid Rail
- Line: 5 Kelana Jaya Line
- Platforms: 2 side platforms
- Tracks: 2

Construction
- Structure type: Elevated
- Parking: Not available

Other information
- Station code: KJ25

History
- Opened: 30 June 2016; 10 years ago

Services
Preceding station		Following station
Kelana Jaya towards Gombak	Kelana Jaya Line	Ara Damansara towards Putra Heights
Location

Lembah Subang LRT station is a light rapid transit (LRT) station at the residental township of Ara Damansara (PJU 1A) in Petaling Jaya, Selangor, Malaysia. It is served by the LRT Kelana Jaya Line. Like most other LRT stations operating in the Klang Valley, this station is elevated. The station is located near the Subang Depot of the Kelana Jaya Line.

The station is in the vicinity of the NZX commercial centre, EVE Suites and the neighbourhoods of Ara Damansara and Taman Megah Mas.

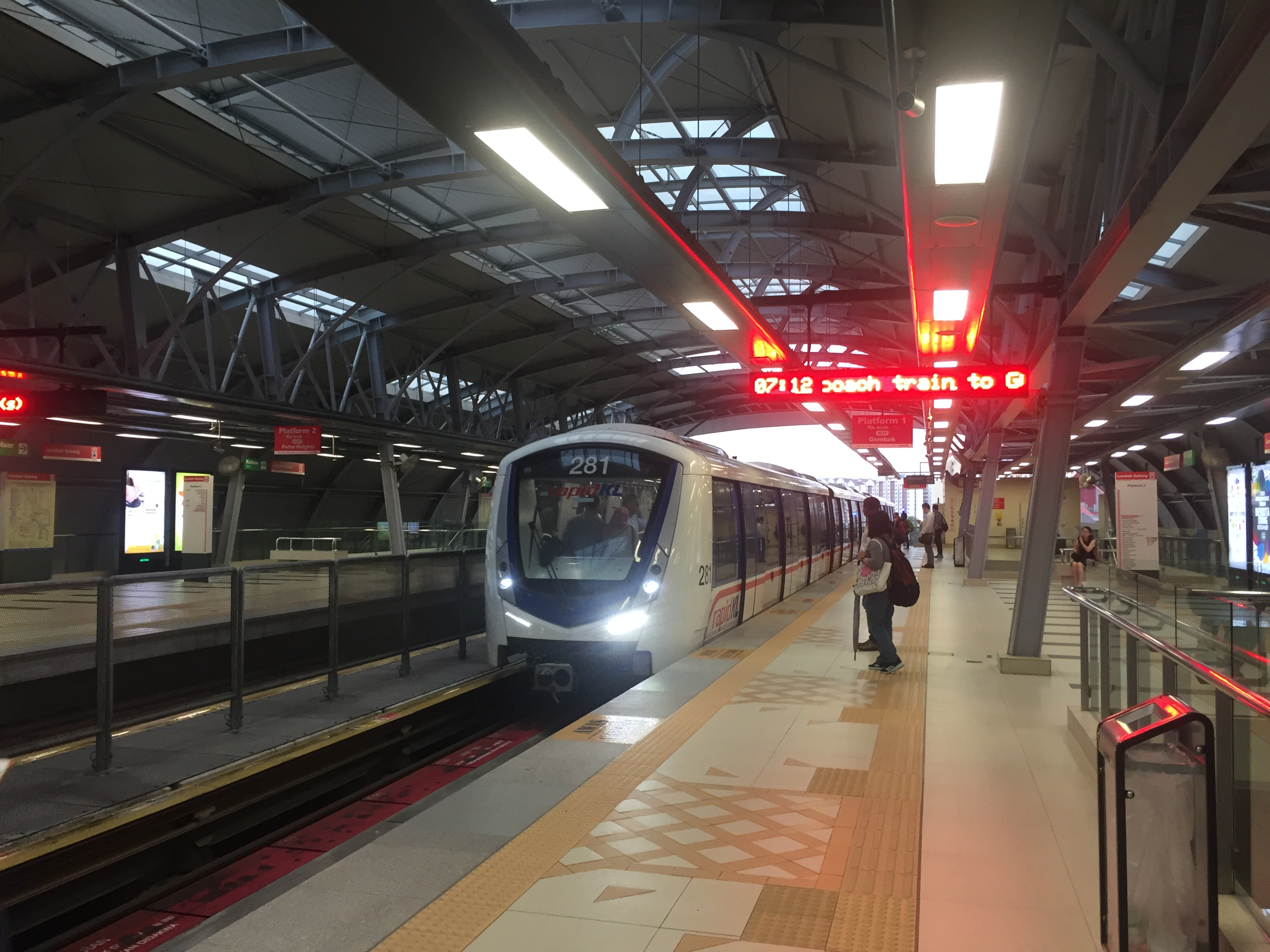
A train arriving at Platform 1 (Gombak-bound) of the station

== Services and connections ==
=== Services ===
In 2019, the peak-hour frequency between Ara Damansara and Gombak was increased. Waiting times were tentatively reduced by half from every 3 minutes to every 1.5 minutes to cater to increasing demand. Frequency went back to being consistent on the entire line when the COVID-19 pandemic began. (Note: In 2020, frequency was reduced when the COVID-19 pandemic hit Malaysia. It was never restored to the Gombak to Ara Damansara 2019 peak-hour frequency as of June 2022.)

=== Feeder bus services ===
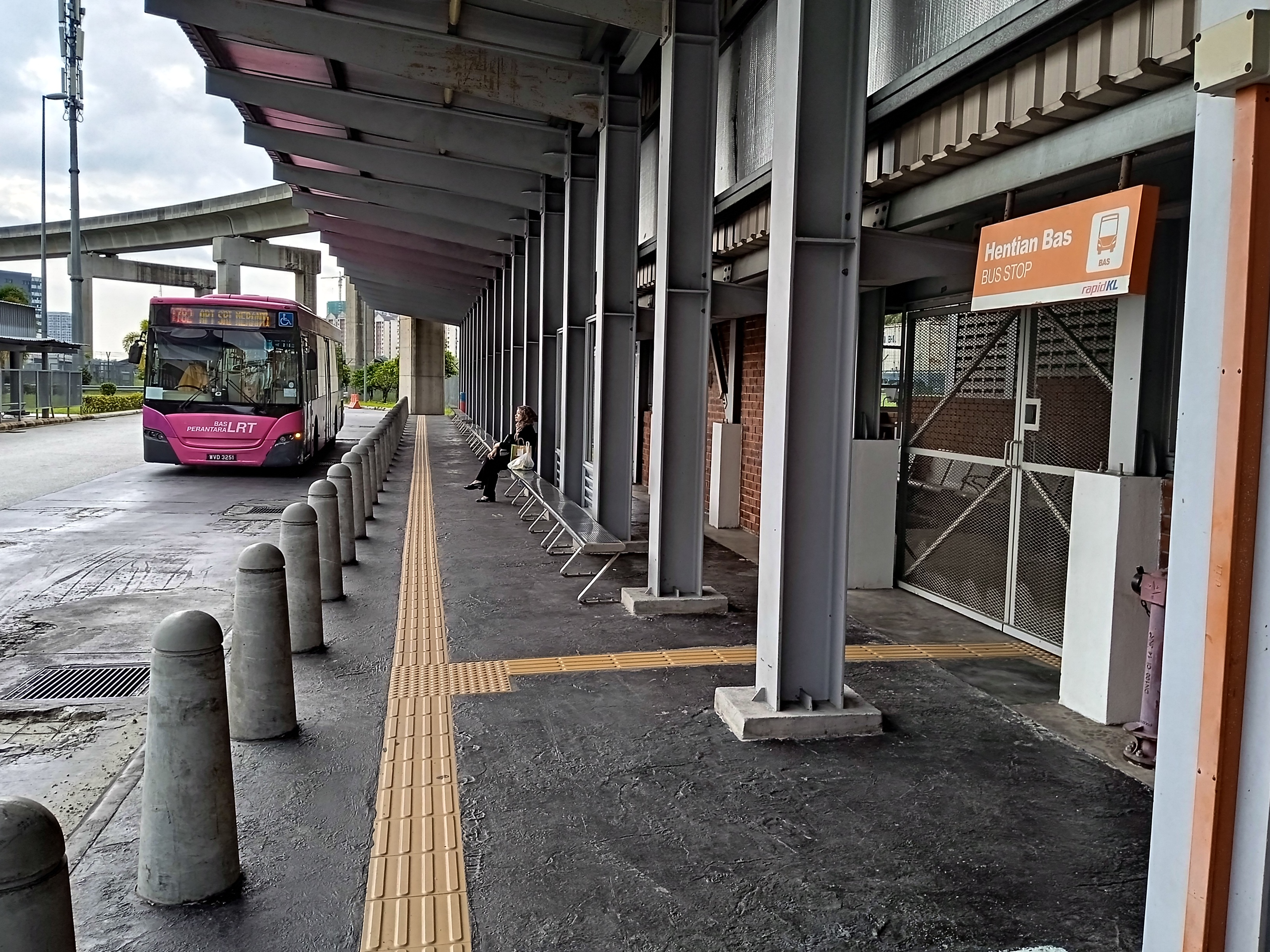
Lembah Subang station bus stop

The Lembah Subang LRT station is served by feeder buses operating for both the LRT Kelana Jaya Line and the MRT Kajang Line.

Route No.	Origin	Destination	Via	Image
T782	KJ25 Lembah Subang	Ara Damansara	Jalan PJU 1A/1	
T807	KG07 Surian	Ara Damansara	Persiaran Surian; Persiaran Damansara Indah; Persiaran Tropicana; Jalan PJU 1A/1; KJ25 Lembah Subang; Jalan Tropika Utama	

Subang Depot
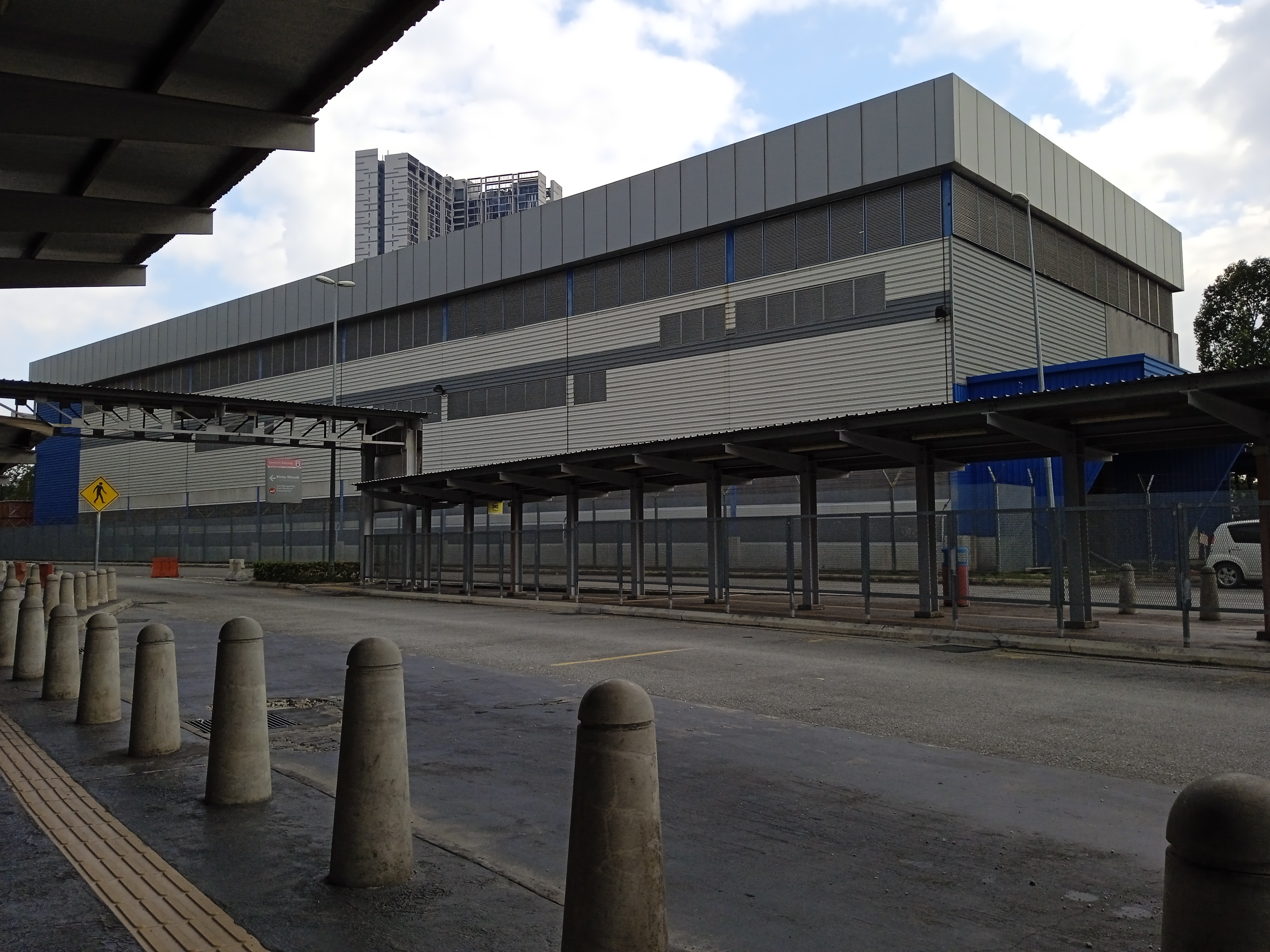
- Interactive map of Subang Depot

Location
- Location: Jalan PJU 1A/28B, Ara Damansara, Petaling Jaya, Selangor, Malaysia

Characteristics
- Owner: Prasarana Malaysia
- Operator: Rapid Rail
- Roads: FT 15; North–South Expressway Northern Route
- Rolling stock: Alstom Innovia ART 200 & Metro 300
- Routes served: 5 Kelana Jaya Line

History
- Opened: 1998; 28 years ago

== Yard ==
Lembah Subang LRT station is also adjacent to the Subang Depot, the only yard serving the Kelana Jaya Line.
