= Ara Damansara Mosque =

Mosque in Petaling, Selangor, Malaysia

- Masjid Ara Damansara
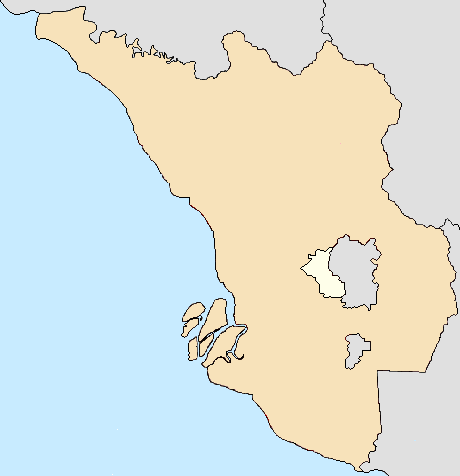
- Location within Petaling Jaya

Religion
- Affiliation: Islam
- Branch/tradition: Sunni

Location
- Location: No 3, Jalan PJU1A/37, Ara Tropika, Ara Damansara, Mukim Damansara, Petaling, Selangor, Malaysia
- Interactive map of Ara Damansara Mosque
- Coordinates: 3°07′01.6″N 101°35′02.2″E

Architecture
- Type: mosque
- Completed: 2015
- Minaret: 1

The Ara Damansara Mosque (Malay: Masjid Ara Damansara) is the first mosque built in the township of Ara Damansara located near Petaling Jaya, Selangor, Malaysia. Spanning 6 acres (2.4 ha), the mosque could accommodate 1,500 congregants at one time.

== History ==
The mosque was built by Sime Darby Properties which is also a developer of Ara Damansara. Construction of the mosque began in 2013 and was completed in 2015. This mosque began operations on 29 January 2015.

Ara Damansara Mosque received the "Best Mosques in Selangor" award in the "local awareness" category in December 2024.

== Features ==
Unique to many mosques in Malaysia, the mosque does not have a dome. Its structure consists only of pillars and a roof, and the congregants pray in an open area. The courtyard area of the mosque is large and includes facilities for exercising.

== See also ==
- Islam in Malaysia
