= Subang Airport Mosque =

Mosque in Subang, Selangor, Malaysia

- Masjid Lapangan Terbang Antarabangsa Subang
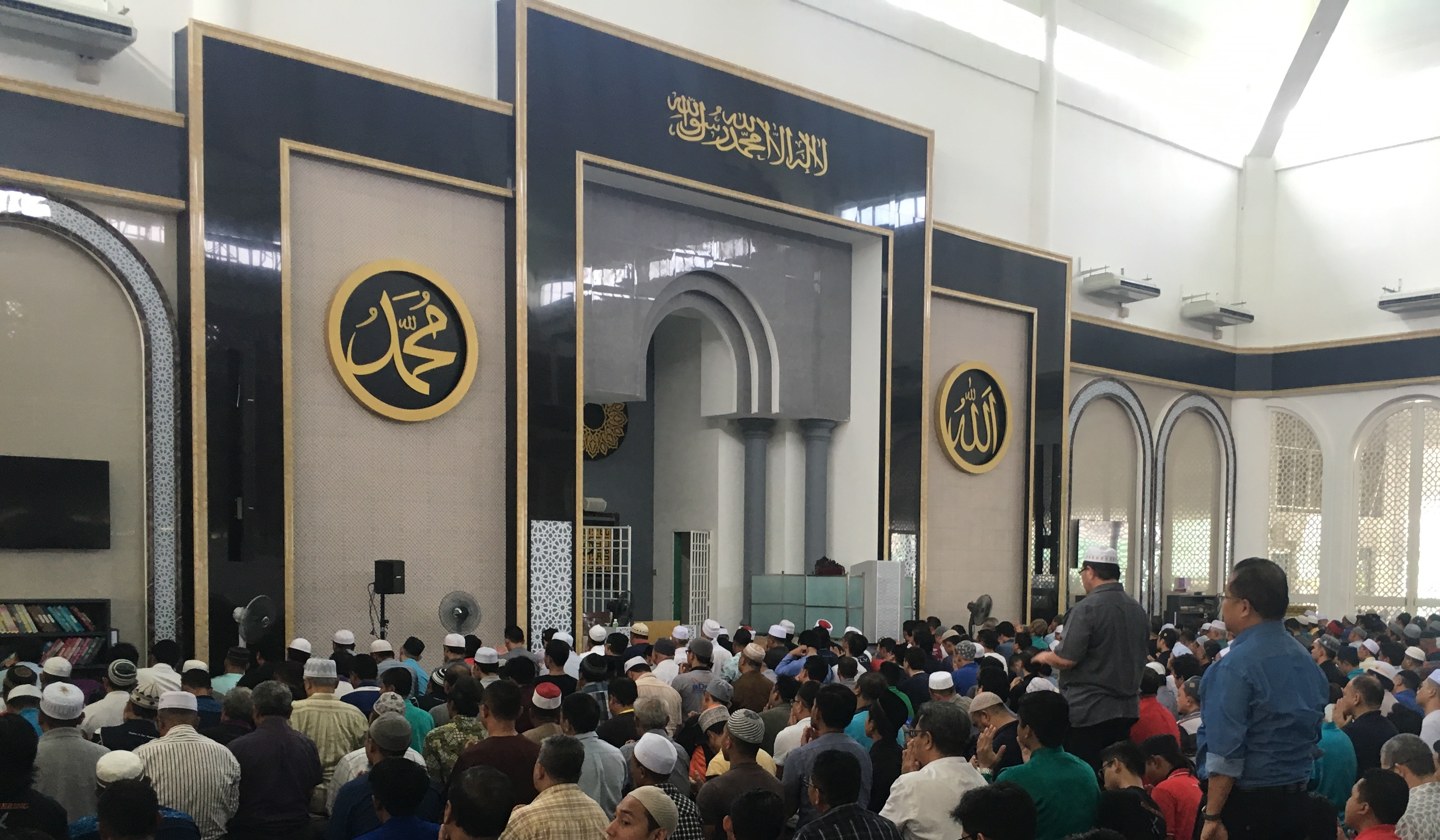

Location
- Location: Subang, Selangor, Malaysia
- Interactive map of Subang Airport Mosque
- Coordinates: 3°07′11.6″N 101°33′51.9″E

Architecture
- Minaret: 4

The Subang Airport Mosque (Malay: Masjid Lapangan Terbang Subang), also known as Masjid Lapangan Terbang Sultan Abdul Aziz and Masjid Hijau Subang Airport is a main mosque in Sultan Abdul Aziz Shah Airport in Subang, Selangor, Malaysia.

It was built in 1990 and opened on 1994. It is also used as an international mosque for tourists who arrive and depart from Malaysia. When Subang Airport was transferred to Kuala Lumpur International Airport (KLIA) in Sepang on 27 June 1998, it was converted into a public mosque for Muslims from Kampung Subang, Ara Damansara and Saujana.

== See also ==
- Islam in Malaysia
