= Malaysia Federal Route 15 =

Road in Malaysia

Federal Route 15

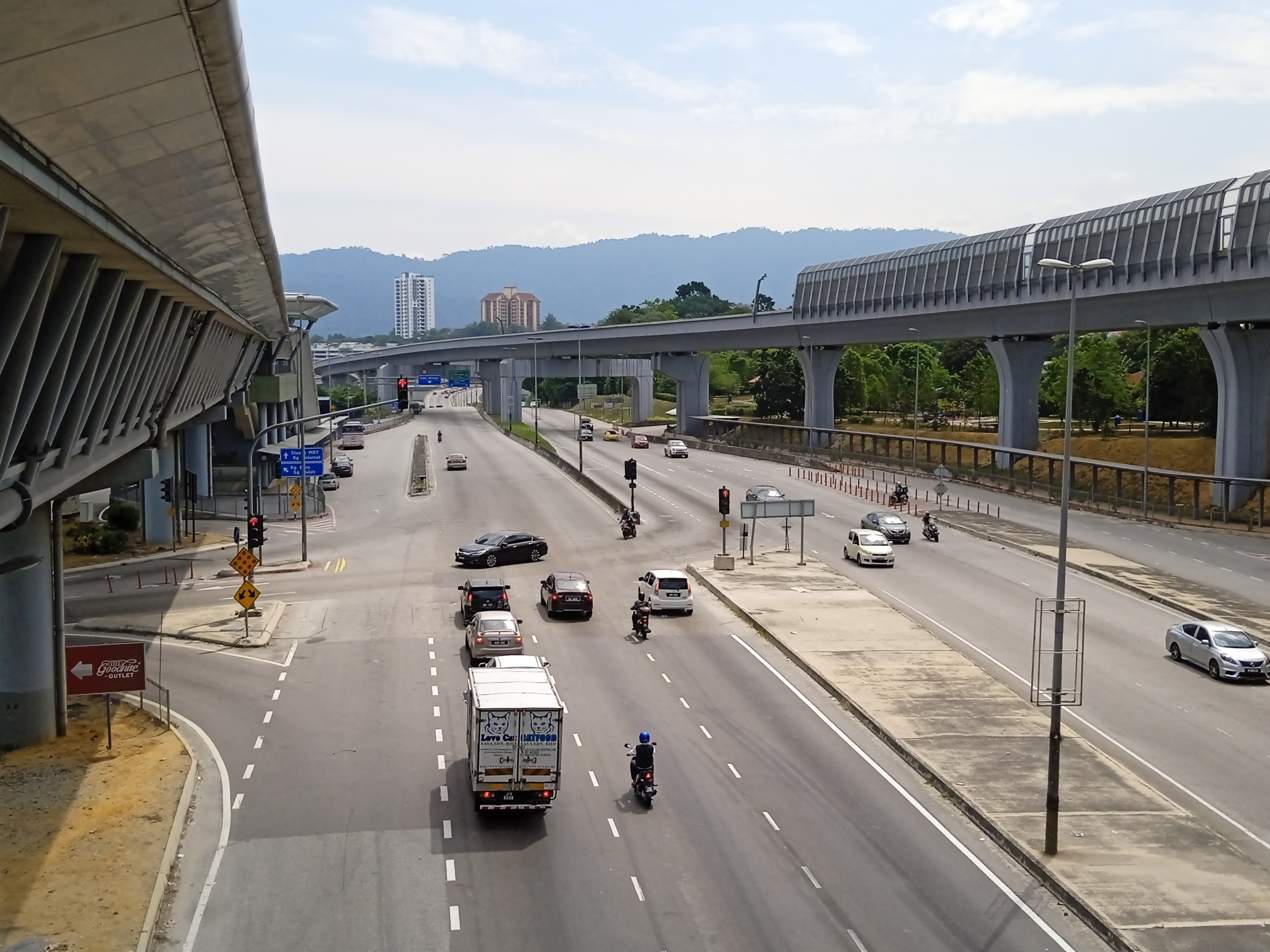

Route information
- Maintained by Malaysian Public Works Department
- Length: 21.82 km (13.56 mi)
- Existed: 1963–present
- History: Completed in 1965

Major junctions
- North end: Sungai Buloh
- FT 54 Sungai Buloh Highway; Damansara–Shah Alam Elevated Expressway; FT 287 Jalan Subang–Batu Tiga New Klang Valley Expressway / AH2 / AH141; FT 2 Federal Highway; New Pantai Expressway; Persiaran Kewajipan
- South end: Persiaran Kewajipan

Location
- Country: Malaysia
- Primary destinations: Kota Damansara, Subang, Bukit Jelutong, Shah Alam, Sultan Abdul Aziz Shah Airport , Kelana Jaya, Subang Jaya, USJ

Highway system
- Highways in Malaysia; Expressways; Federal; State

Federal Route 15 is main federal road in the Klang Valley region, Selangor, Malaysia. The main link begins from Kampung Melayu Subang at Subang to Sultan Abdul Aziz Shah Airport (Skypark) and ends at Subang Jaya.

== Overview ==
=== Sultan Abdul Aziz Shah Airport Road ===
The Sultan Abdul Aziz Shah Airport Highway is a major road linking Subang Jaya interchange of the Federal Highway (Federal Route 2) to the Sultan Abdul Aziz Shah Airport.

=== Subang–Kelana Jaya Link ===
The Subang–Kelana Jaya Link is an elevated highway linking Subang Jaya interchange of the Federal Route 2 to Persiaran Kewajipan.

== Route background ==
The Kilometre Zero is located at Subang Jaya, at its interchange with the Federal Route 2.

== Features ==
- The highway is lined by palm oil trees and rubber trees until 1999. But today it was developed as the new township area like Ara Damansara.
- Many seafood restaurants along this road near Subang Airport.
- The Kewajipan flyover on the Bulatan Kewajipan roundabout is a tallest flyover of the Subang–Kelana Jaya Link.
- The elevated Sungai Buloh–Kajang MRT line from Sungai Buloh to Kwasa Sentral.
- The elevated Kelana Jaya LRT line from Ara Damansara to Glenmarie.

At most sections, the Federal Route 15 was built under the JKR R5 road standard, allowing maximum speed limit of up to 90 km/h.

There is an alternate route: Subang North–Terminal 3: Subang Bypass (part of Subang Airport Highway).

One section has motorcycle lanes: Subang Airport roundabout–Subang-NKVE interchange.

== Junction lists ==
The entire route is located in Petaling District, Selangor.

Legend:

- I/C - Interchange, I/S - Intersection, RSA - Rest and service area, OBR - Overhead bridge restaurant, R/R - Restaurant and rest plaza, L/B - Layby, V/P - Vista point, TN - tunnel, T/P - Toll plaza, BR - Bridge
- C - Cloverleaf, S - Stack, T-A - Trumpet-A, T-B - Trumpet-B, DT - Directional-T/Y, SDT - Semi-Directional-T/Y, P-Y - Partial-Y, D - Diamond, P-C - Partial cloverleaf, D-D - Diverging diamond, D-R - Direct ramp

Location	km	mi	Exit	Name	Destinations	Notes
Sungai Buloh				Sungai Buloh	FT 54 Sungai Buloh Highway – Bandar Baru Sungai Buloh, Kuala Selangor, Kepong, Kuala Lumpur; North–South Expressway Northern Route / AH2 – Ipoh, Rawang, Klang, Kuala Lumpur International Airport (KLIA), Johor Bahru	Half-diamond interchange
Sungai Buloh				Kem Sungai Buloh	Kem Sungai Buloh	
Sungai Buloh				Kampung Baru Sungai Buloh	Jalan Welfare (Welfare Road) – Kampung Baru Sungai Buloh	T-junctions
Sungai Buloh				Kampung Selamat MRT station	Kampung Selamat MRT station 12	
Sungai Buloh				Sungai Buloh MRT Depot	Sungai Buloh Depot 9 12 – Centralised Labour Quarters	
Kota Damansara				Kota Damansara	Persiaran Mahogani – Kota Damansara, Mutiara Damansara New Klang Valley Expressway / AH2 / AH141 – Ipoh, Kuala Lumpur, Klang, Kuala Lumpur International Airport (KLIA), Johor Bahru	LILO exit
Kota Damansara				Kwasa Damansara		
Kota Damansara				Kwasa Damansara MRT station	P&R Kwasa Damansara MRT station 9 12	
Kota Damansara				Kwasa Damansara		
Kota Damansara				Kota Damansara	Persiaran Jati – Kota Damansara, Mutiara Damansara New Klang Valley Expressway / AH2 / AH141 – Ipoh, Kuala Lumpur, Klang, Kuala Lumpur International Airport (KLIA), Johor Bahru	T-junctions
Kota Damansara				Kota Damansara	Persiaran Sungai Buloh – Kota Damansara, Mutiara Damansara New Klang Valley Expressway / AH2 / AH141 – Ipoh, Kuala Lumpur, Klang, Kuala Lumpur International Airport (KLIA), Johor Bahru	T-junctions
Kota Damansara				Kwasa Sentral MRT station	P&R Kwasa Sentral MRT station 9	
Kota Damansara				RRIM	Rubber Research Institute of Malaysia (RRIM)	
Kota Damansara				RRIM I/C	Damansara–Shah Alam Elevated Expressway – Kepong, Sungai Buloh, Bandar Sri Damansara, Petaling Jaya, Puchong, Putrajaya, Cyberjaya, Sungai Besi	Exit only to Damansara
Subang				Subang North	West; FT 287 Jalan Subang–Batu Tiga – Bukit Subang, Batu Tiga, Shah Alam	T-junctions
Subang			Subang North–Subang see also Sultan Abdul Aziz Shah Airport Highway			
Subang			Sungai Damansara bridge			
Subang				Subang	FT 233 Jalan Lama Lapangan Terbang Subang – Subang Town Centre, Kampung Baru Subang, TUDM Subang	T-junctions
Subang				Seafood Restaurant		
Subang				Airod	Airod	
Subang			Terminal 3–Subang-Federal Highway I/C see also Sultan Abdul Aziz Shah Airport Highway			
Subang			Subang-Federal Highway I/C–Persiaran Kewajipan see also Subang–Kelana Jaya Link			
1.000 mi = 1.609 km; 1.000 km = 0.621 mi: Incomplete access
