= Glenmarie LRT station =

Light rapid transit station in Subang, Selangor, Malaysia

KJ27 Glenmarie; SA07 Glenmarie 2
- Exterior view of the Kelana Jaya Line station

General information
- Other names: Malay: ݢلينماري (Jawi); Chinese: 格林玛丽; Tamil: கிளன்மேரி
- Location: Sultan Abdul Aziz Shah Airport Highway, Glenmarie, Section U1, 40150 Shah Alam; Selangor; Malaysia
- Coordinates: 3.0958°N 101.5905°E
- System: Rapid KL
- Owner: Prasarana Malaysia
- Operator: Rapid Rail
- Lines: 5 Kelana Jaya Line; 11 Shah Alam Line
- Platforms: 5 : 1 island platform; 11 : 2 side platforms
- Tracks: 5 : 2; 11 : 2

Construction
- Structure type: Elevated
- Parking: Available with payment, 569 total parking bays.
- Cycle facilities: Available, 20 bicycle bays.
- Accessible: Yes

Other information
- Station code: KJ27 SA07

History
- Opened: 5 : 30 June 2016; 10 years ago; 11 : 29 June 2026; 4 months ago
- Former names: 5 : CGC-Glenmarie (2017 – 2026)

Services
Preceding station		Following station
Ara Damansara towards Gombak	Kelana Jaya Line	Subang Jaya towards Putra Heights
Subang towards Bandar Utama	Shah Alam Line	Kerjaya towards Johan Setia
Subang towards Bandar Utama	Shah Alam Line Future service (2031)	Temasya towards Johan Setia
Location

The Glenmarie LRT station is an integrated light rapid transit (LRT) elevated station in Glenmarie (Section U1), Shah Alam, and located on the borders near Kelana Jaya and Subang, Malaysia. It is currently served by the LRT Kelana Jaya Line and the LRT Shah Alam Line. The Shah Alam Line portion of this station is known as Glenmarie 2.

== History ==
The Kelana Jaya Line portion of the station opened on 30 June 2016, as part of the Kelana Jaya line extension project. The Shah Alam Line portion of the station opened on 29 June 2026.

From 30 August 2017 to early 2026, Credit Guarantee Corporation (CGC) Malaysia Berhad acquired the naming rights of the Kelana Jaya Line station, which is located about 100 metres from CGC's headquarters in Kelana Jaya, under Prasarana Malaysia's station naming rights programme. The Kelana Jaya Line station was thus previously known as CGC-Glenmarie.

== Station Features ==
=== Location ===
The station building for the Kelana Jaya Line portion is located on top of the Sultan Abdul Aziz Shah Airport Highway (part of Federal Route 15) adjacent to the neighbourhood of SS7 in Kelana Jaya, and is also nearby the Petaling Jaya Stadium which is the former home venue of the Petaling Jaya Rangers that competed in the Malaysia third-tier football league. There is also a sheltered walkway to Lincoln University College. The station building for the Shah Alam Line portion is located next to the Federal Route 3213 (Persiaran Kerjaya), just slightly west to the Kelana Jaya Line station. Both stations are interconnected by an elevated pedestrian walkway linkbridge, which is also connected to Entrance A of both stations.

Despite sharing the same name, the LRT station will not be an interchange with the proposed infill Glenmarie Komuter station on the KL Sentral-Terminal Skypark Line, which is set to be approximately 2.6 km away near the Glenmarie Industrial Park.

There is a Park N' Ride facility provided serving both stations that can house up to 569 cars. A bicycle rack is also available at both stations, with a capacity of 20 bicycles.

=== Station layout ===
==== Kelana Jaya Line ====
L2	Platform; Level	→ Platform 1: 5 Kelana Jaya Line towards KJ37 Putra Heights (Subang Jaya)
L2	Platform; Level	Island platform, doors will open on the right
L2	Platform; Level	← Platform 2: 5 Kelana Jaya Line towards KJ1 Gombak (Ara Damansara)
L1	Concourse	Faregates to paid area, escalators, lifts, ticketing machines, kiosks, customer service counter, pedestrian linkbridge to 11 Shah Alam Line
G	Ground Level	Feeder Bus Stop, Taxi Lay-By, Park N' Ride

The Kelana Jaya Line portion of the station consists of 3 levels, with an island platform above the concourse area. The station's Entrance A connects commuters directly to the Park N' Ride area of the station and also towards the Shah Alam Line portion of the station via a pedestrian linkbridge.

==== Shah Alam Line ====
L3	Platform; Level	Side platform, doors will open on the left
L3	Platform; Level	→ Platform 1: 11 Shah Alam Line towards SA01 Bandar Utama (Subang)
L3	Platform; Level	← Platform 2: 11 Shah Alam Line towards SA26 Johan Setia (Kerjaya)
L3	Platform; Level	Side platform, doors will open on the left
L2	Concourse	Faregates to paid area, escalators, lifts, ticketing machines, kiosks, customer service counter, direct exit to Entrance C
L1	KJL-SAL; Linkbridge	Escalators, lifts, pedestrian linkbridge to 5 Kelana Jaya Line
G	Ground Level	Feeder Bus Stop, Taxi Lay-By

The Shah Alam Line portion of the station consists of 4 levels, with two side platform above the concourse area on Level 2. The station's Entrance C directly connects commuters to the station's concourse and the feeder bus stop and taxi lay-by area. Level 1 of the station mainly links commuters towards the Kelana Jaya Line portion of the station via a pedestrian linkbridge.

=== Exits and entrances ===
Entrance	Location	Destination	Picture
A	KJL-SAL Linkbridge	Feeder bus stop, taxi and private vehicle lay-by Park N' Ride	
B	SS 7 Kelana Jaya	Kelana Business Centre	
C	Temasya Glenmarie	Feeder bus stop, taxi and private vehicle lay-by	

Entrance A connects commuters to both stations via an elevated pedestrian linkbridge and the station's Park N' Ride area. Entrance B is located to the east side across the Subang Airport highway which then connects commuters to the SS 7 neighbourhood of Kelana Jaya. Entrance C is the main entrance to the Shah Alam Line portion of the station and also connects commuters to its bus stop and vehicle lay-by.

== Bus services ==
=== Feeder buses ===
Route No.	Origin	Destination	Via	Connecting to
T774	KJ27 SA07 Glenmarie	Shah Alam Stadium	Jalan Kerjaya (Glenmarie); Jalan Subang-Batu Tiga; Persiaran Sukan; Jalan Batu Tiga Lama	754, SA02, SA05
T781	KJ24 Kelana Jaya	Kelana Centre Point / Stadium MBPJ; SA06 Subang	Damansara–Puchong Expressway; Jalan SS 7/26; Jalan SS 7/19; KJ27 SA07 Glenmarie; Jalan SS 7/2; Jalan SS 7/15; Jalan SS 7/13	783, T780

=== Other buses ===
Route No.	Origin	Destination	Via	Connecting to
772	KJ14 KG16 Pasar Seni	Subang Suria	Jalan Tun Tan Cheng Lock; Jalan Tun Sambanthan (KL Sentral); Jalan Bangsar; Federal Highway; KJ27 SA07 Glenmarie; KJ28 Ara Damansara; Sultan Abdul Aziz Shah Airport; Subang Perdana; Kampung Melayu Subang; Persiaran Galaksi; Jalan Utarid U5/27; Jalan Utarid U5/3; Persiaran Atmosphera	T802, T803

=== On-Demand Routes ===
Route No.	Origin	Destination	App
T774B	KJ27 SA07 Glenmarie	Seksyen 13, Shah Alam	Rapid On-Demand
T775B	KJ27 SA07 Glenmarie	Temasya Glenmarie	Rapid On-Demand

== Gallery ==
=== Kelana Jaya Line ===
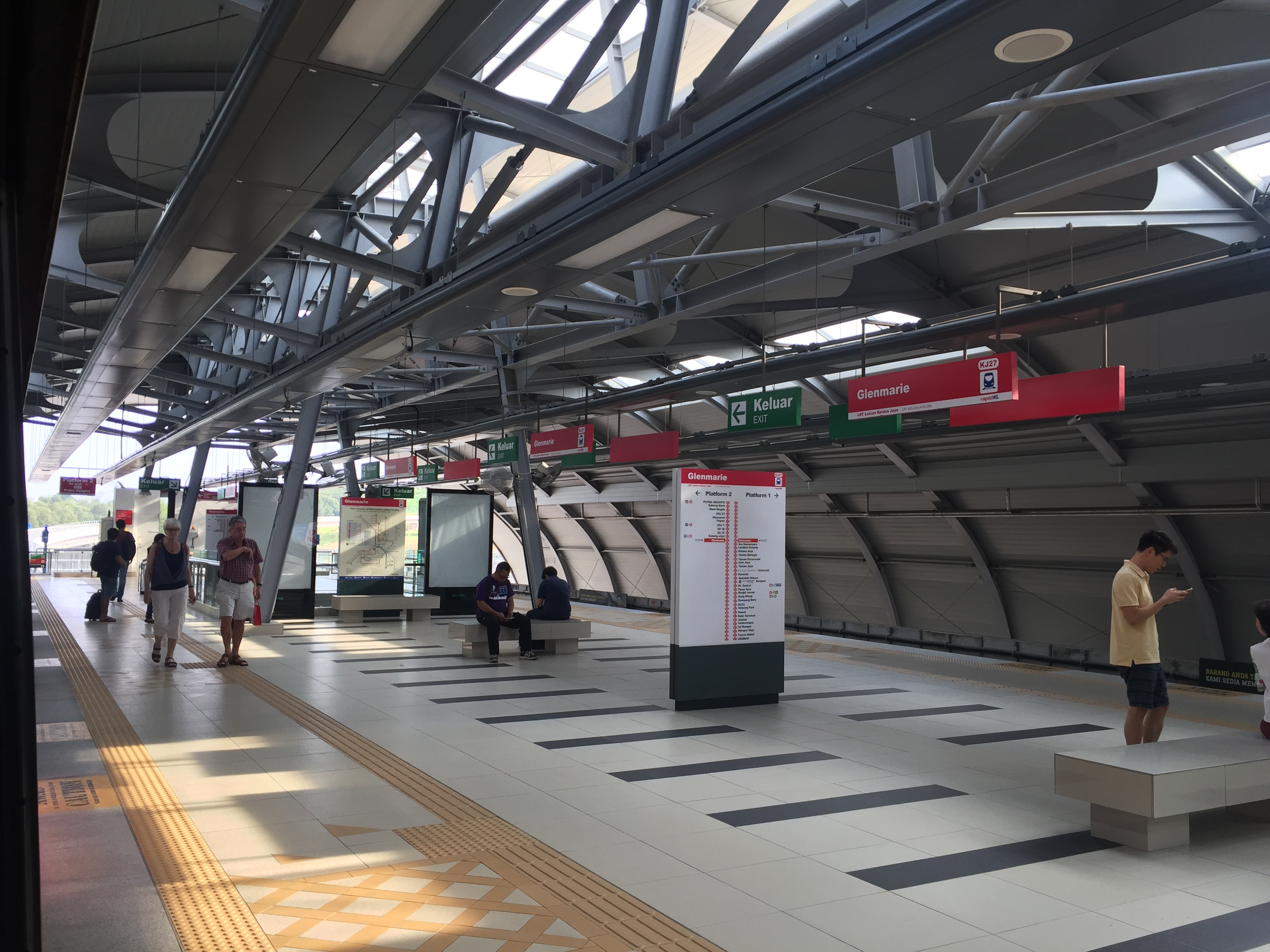
The island platform of the Kelana Jaya Line

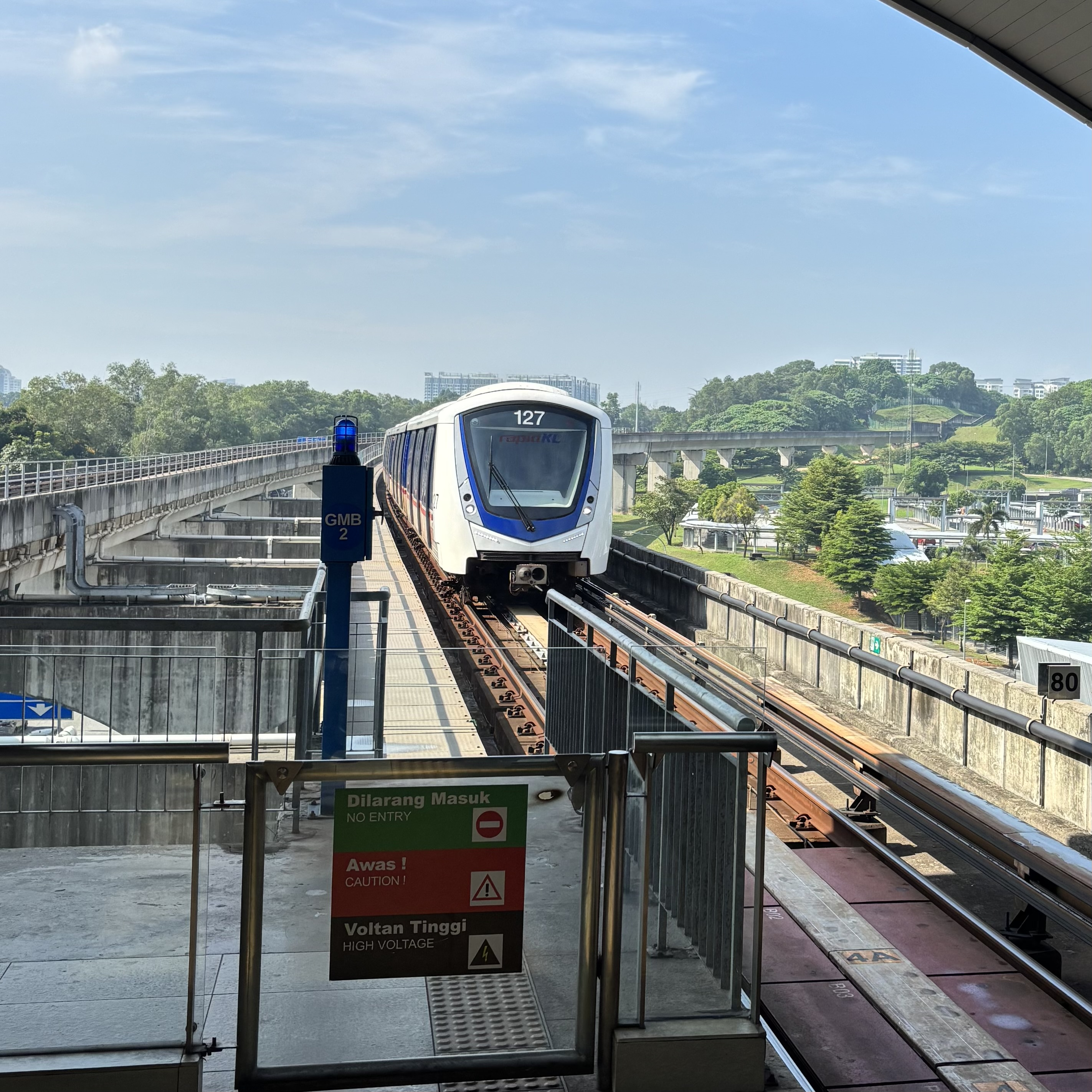
Train approaching Glenmarie station bound for Gombak

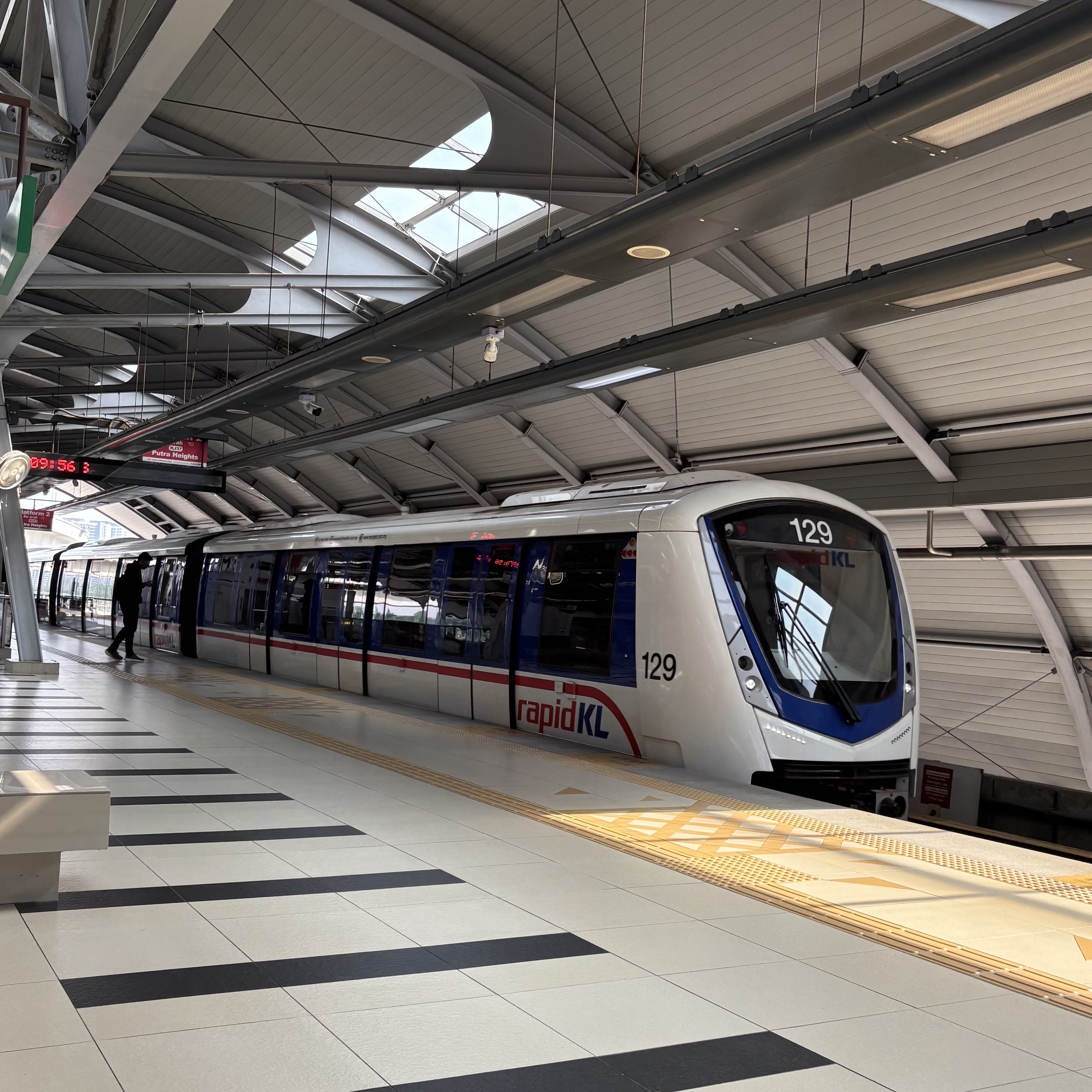
Train arriving in Glenmarie Station heading towards Putra Heights

Side exterior view of the station

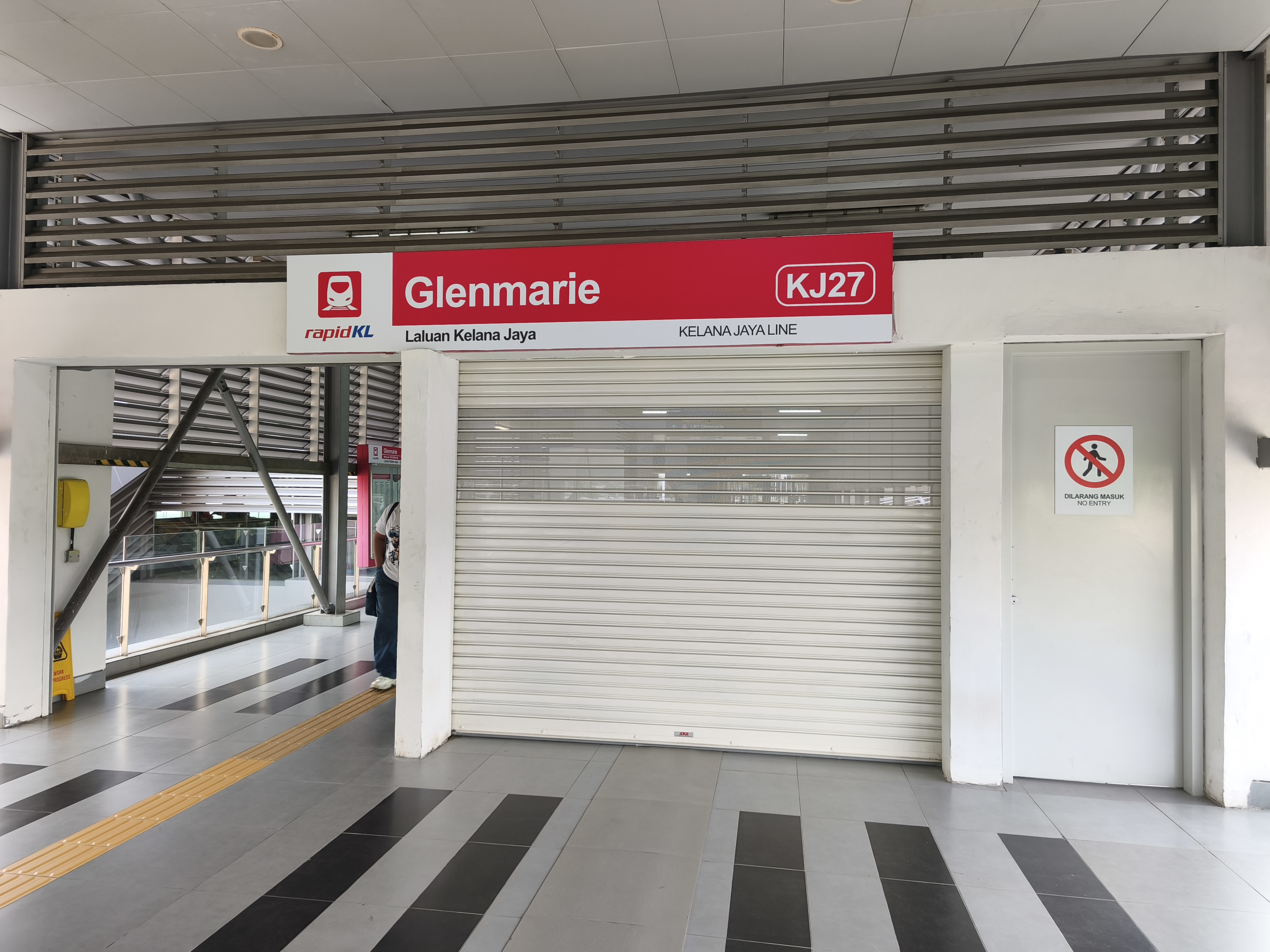
View of the entrance from the KJL-SAL linkbridge

View of the station's customer service counter

View of the station's faregates

View of the station's concourse, with escalators towards the platform area

=== Shah Alam Line ===
View of the station under construction in 2024

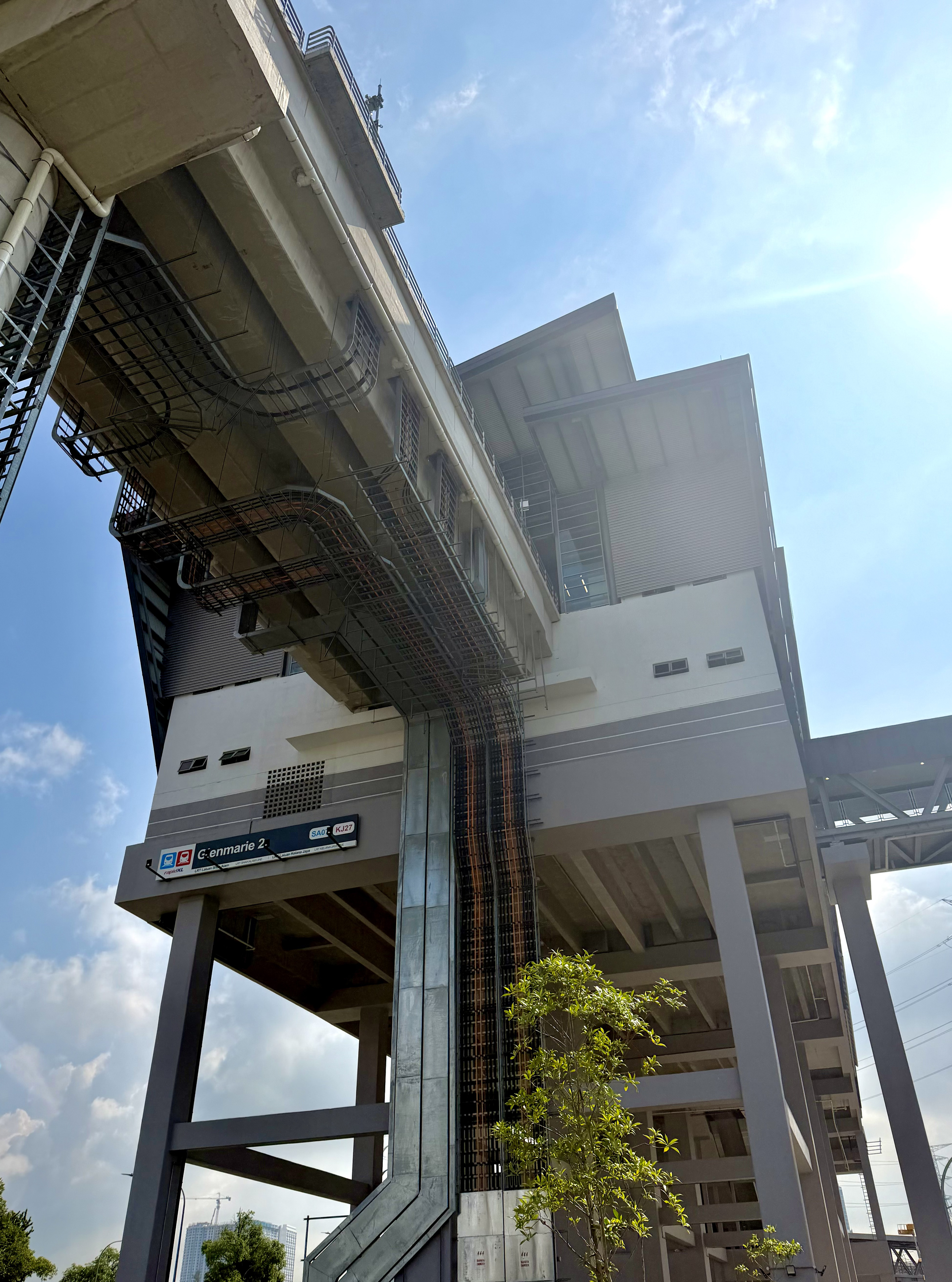
Low-angle perspective view of the station building

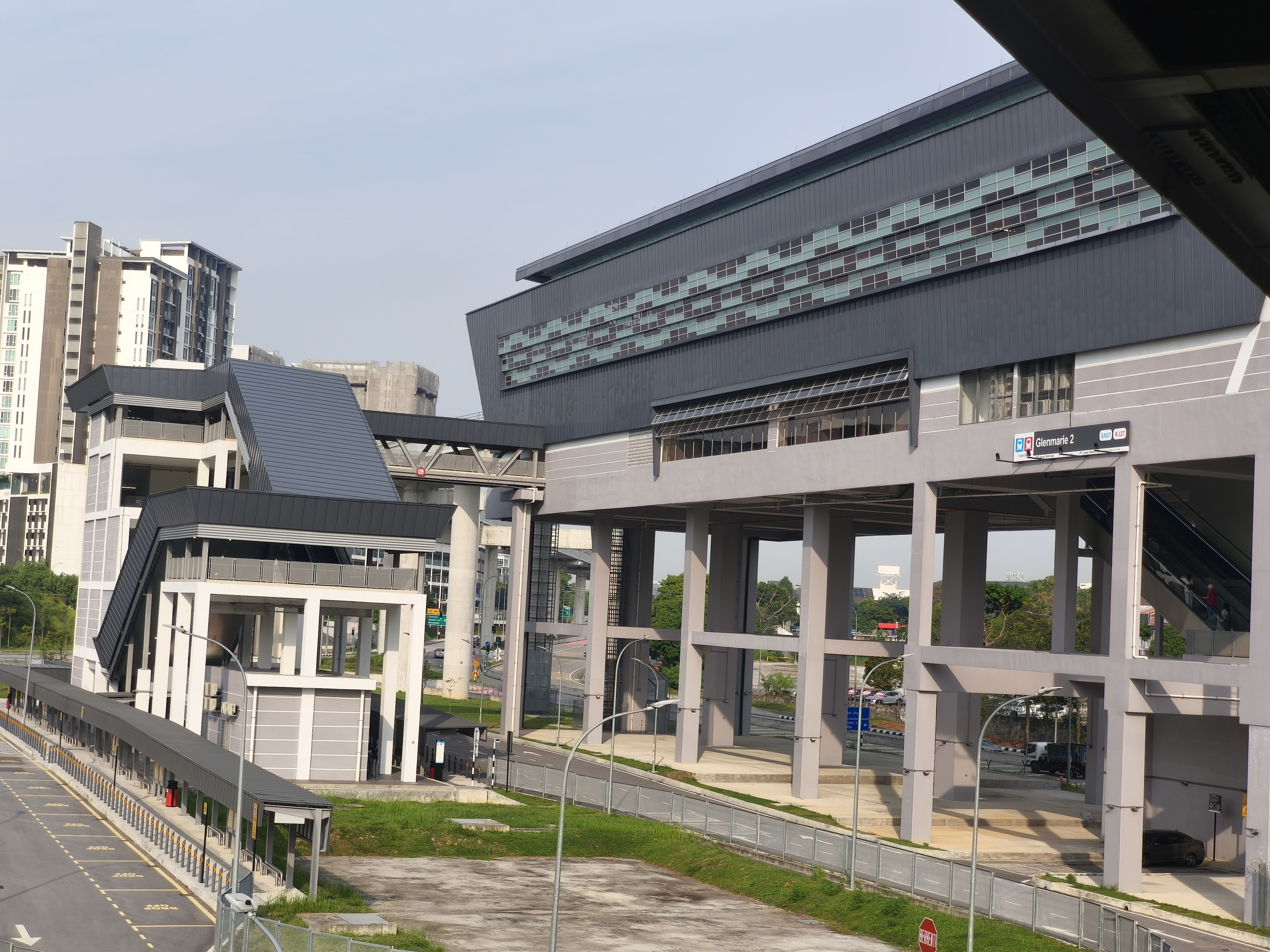
Side exterior view of the station from the pedestrian linkbridge

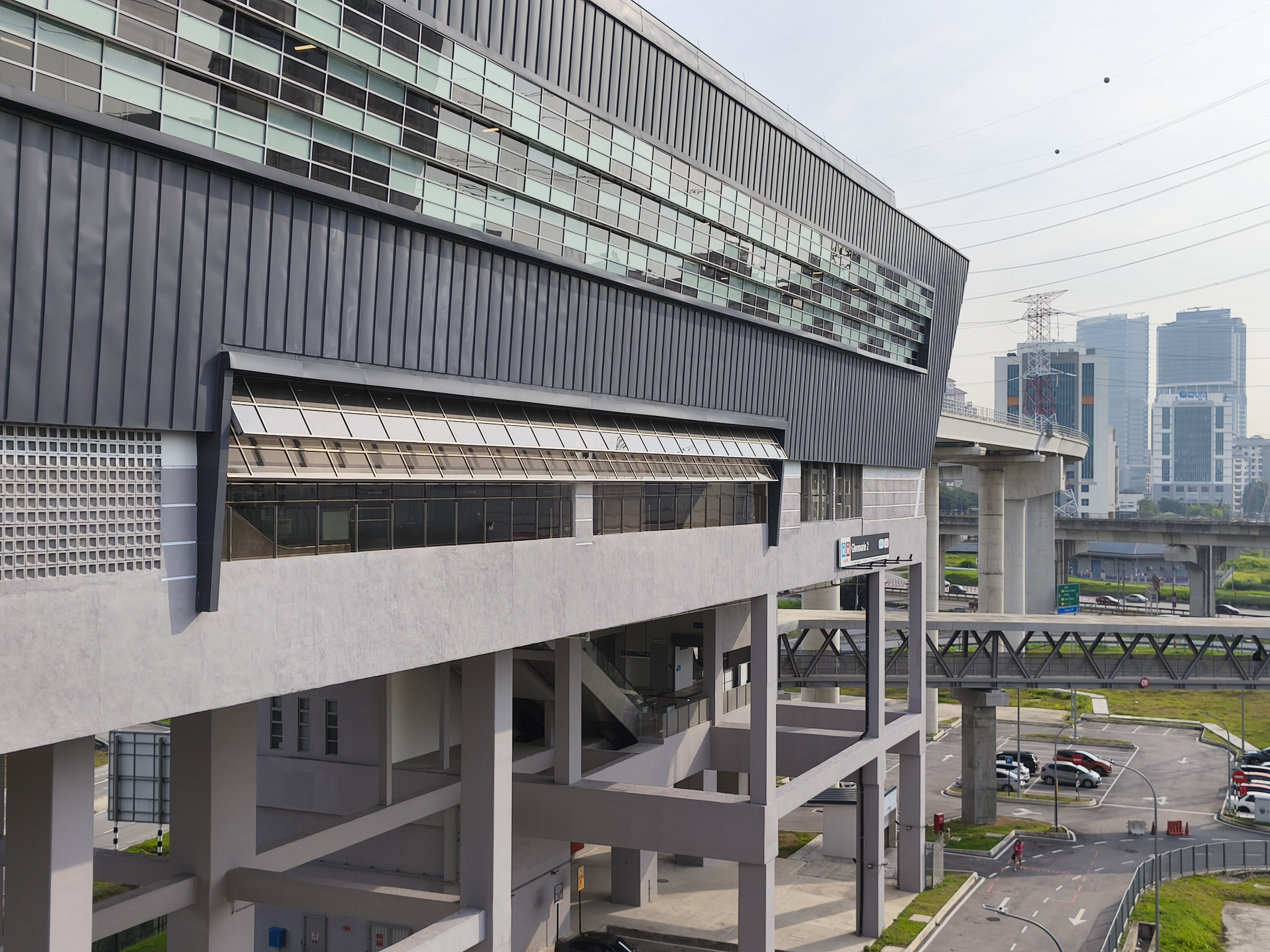
Side exterior view of the station from Entrance C

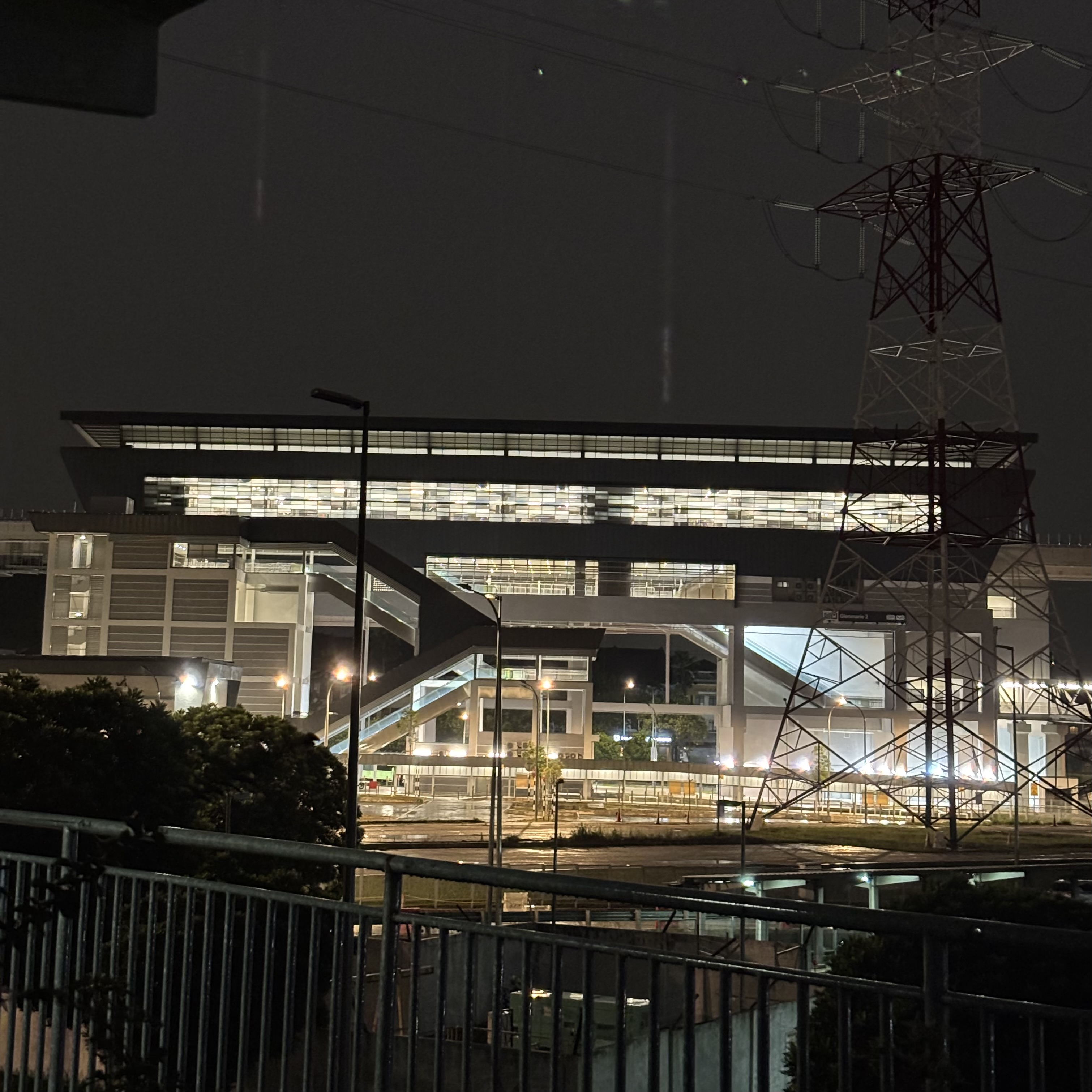
View of the station at night

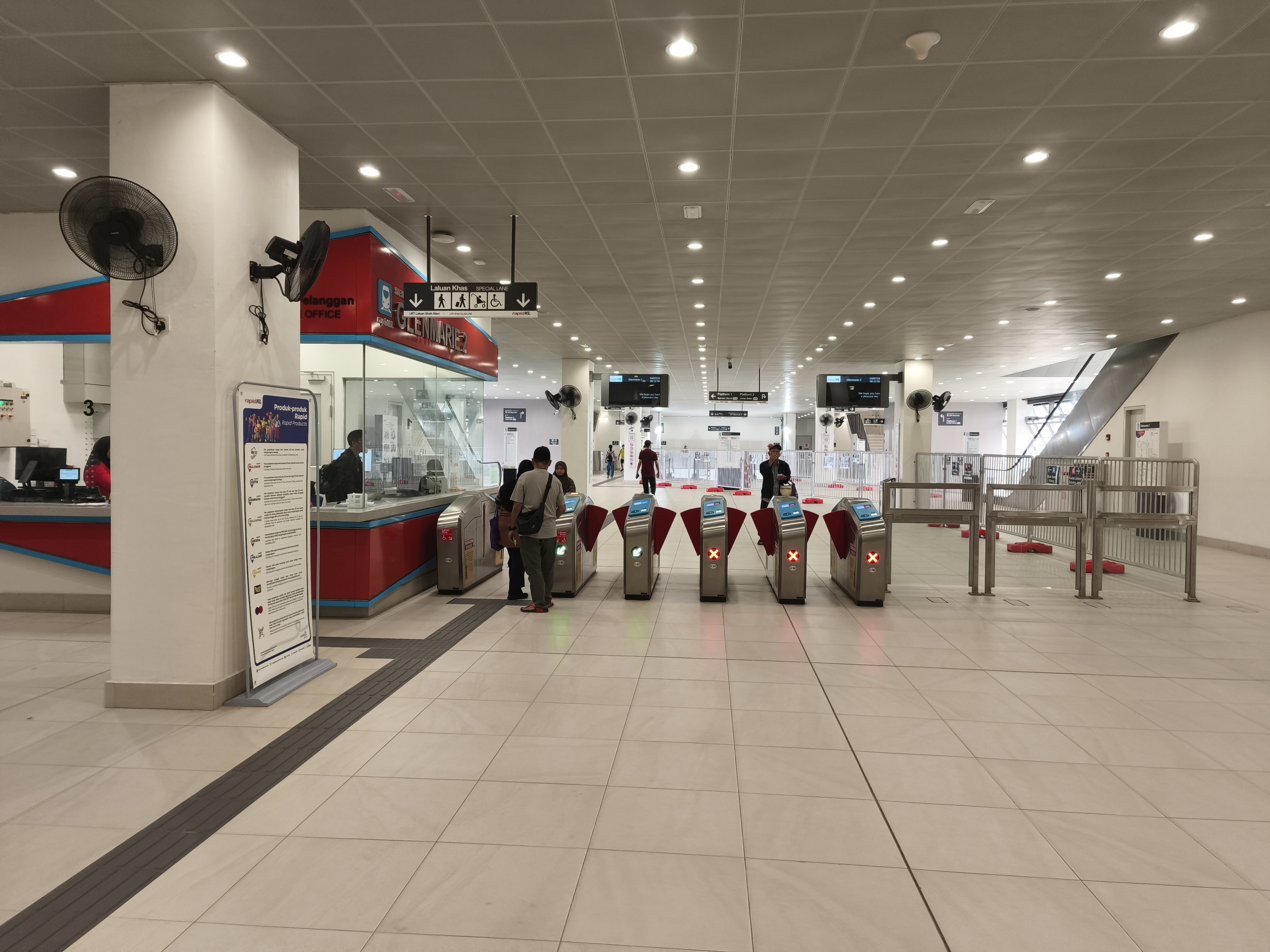
View of the station's customer service counter and faregates

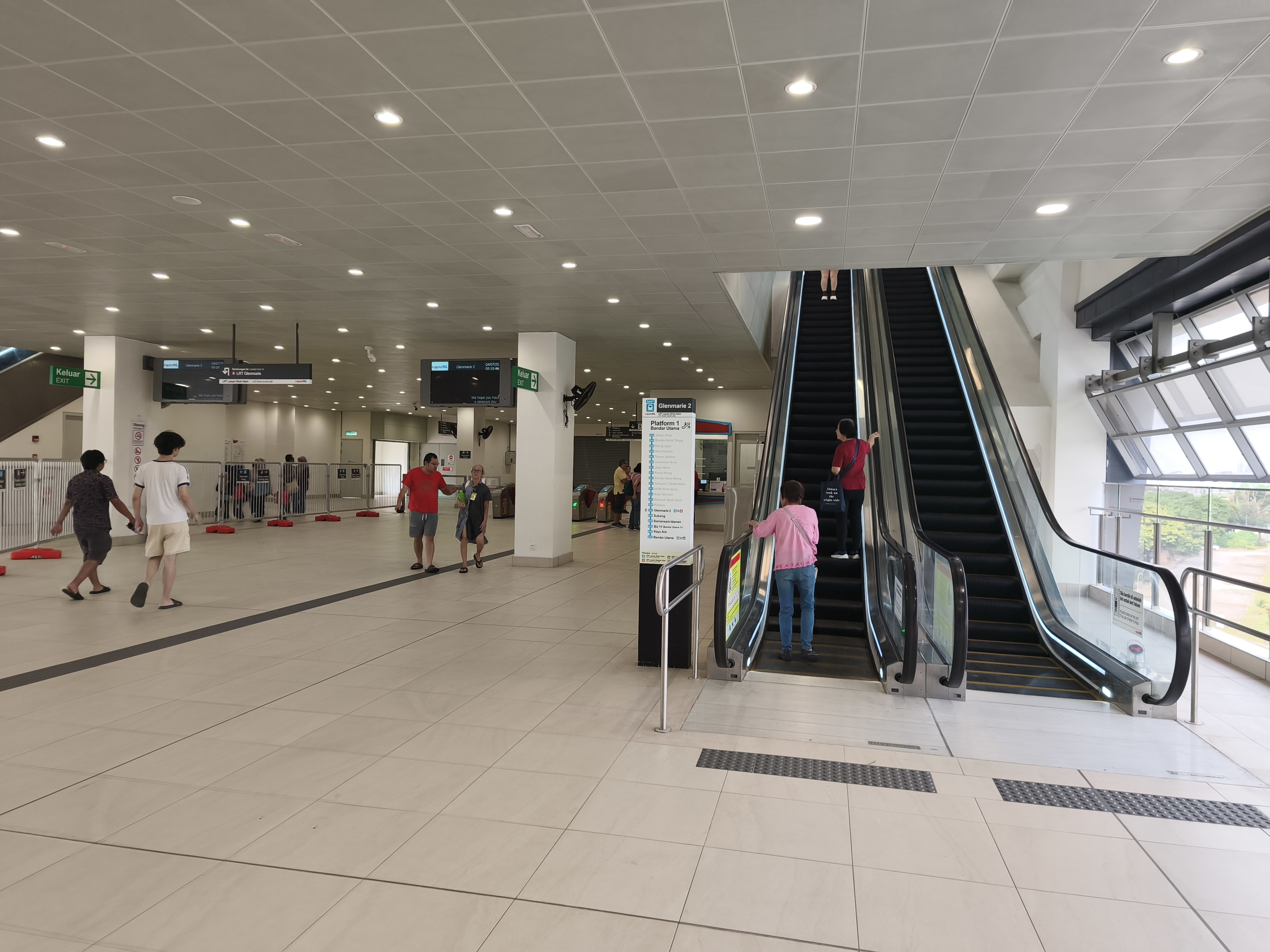
View of the station's concourse, with escalators towards the platform area

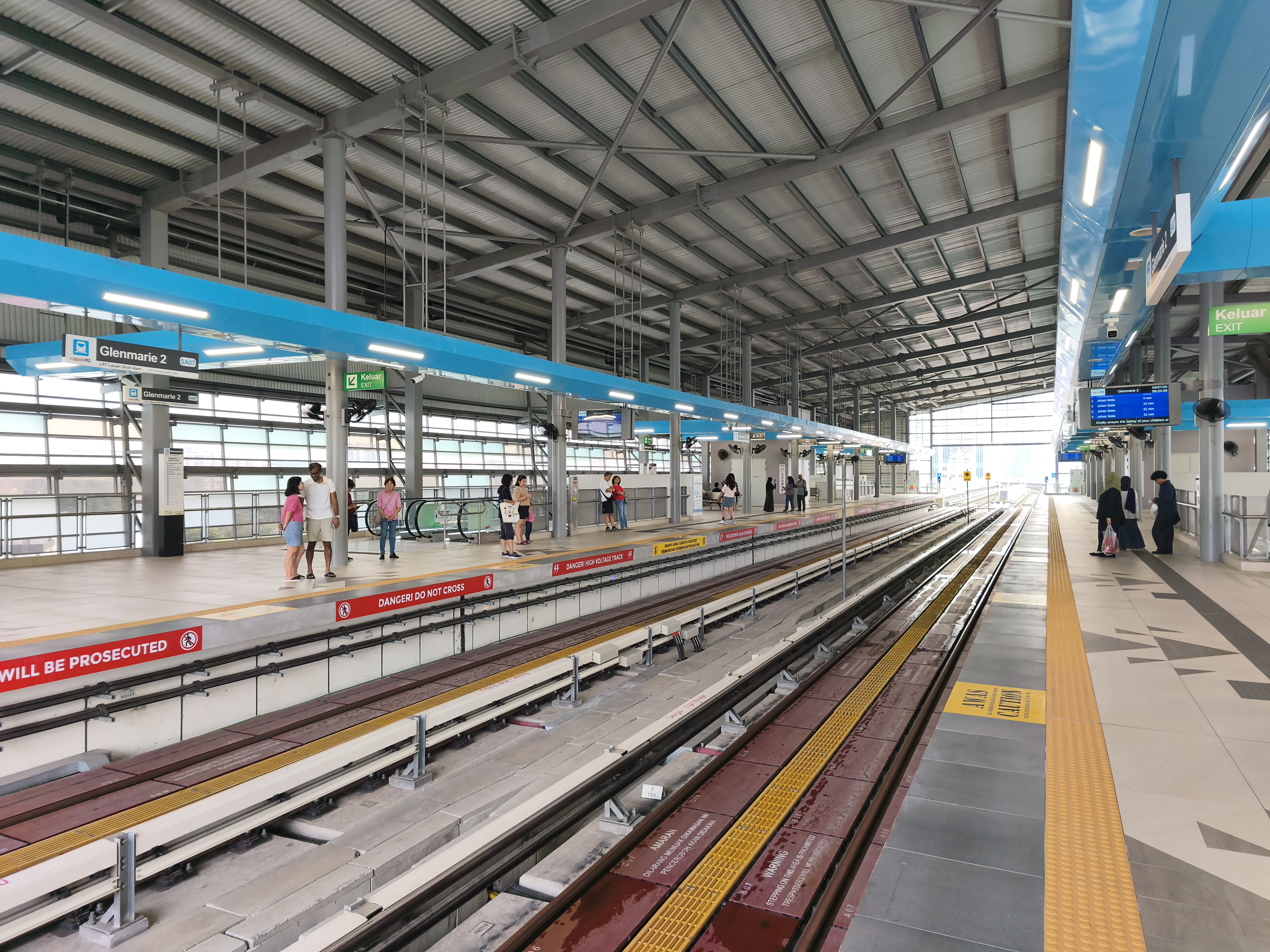
View of the station's platform

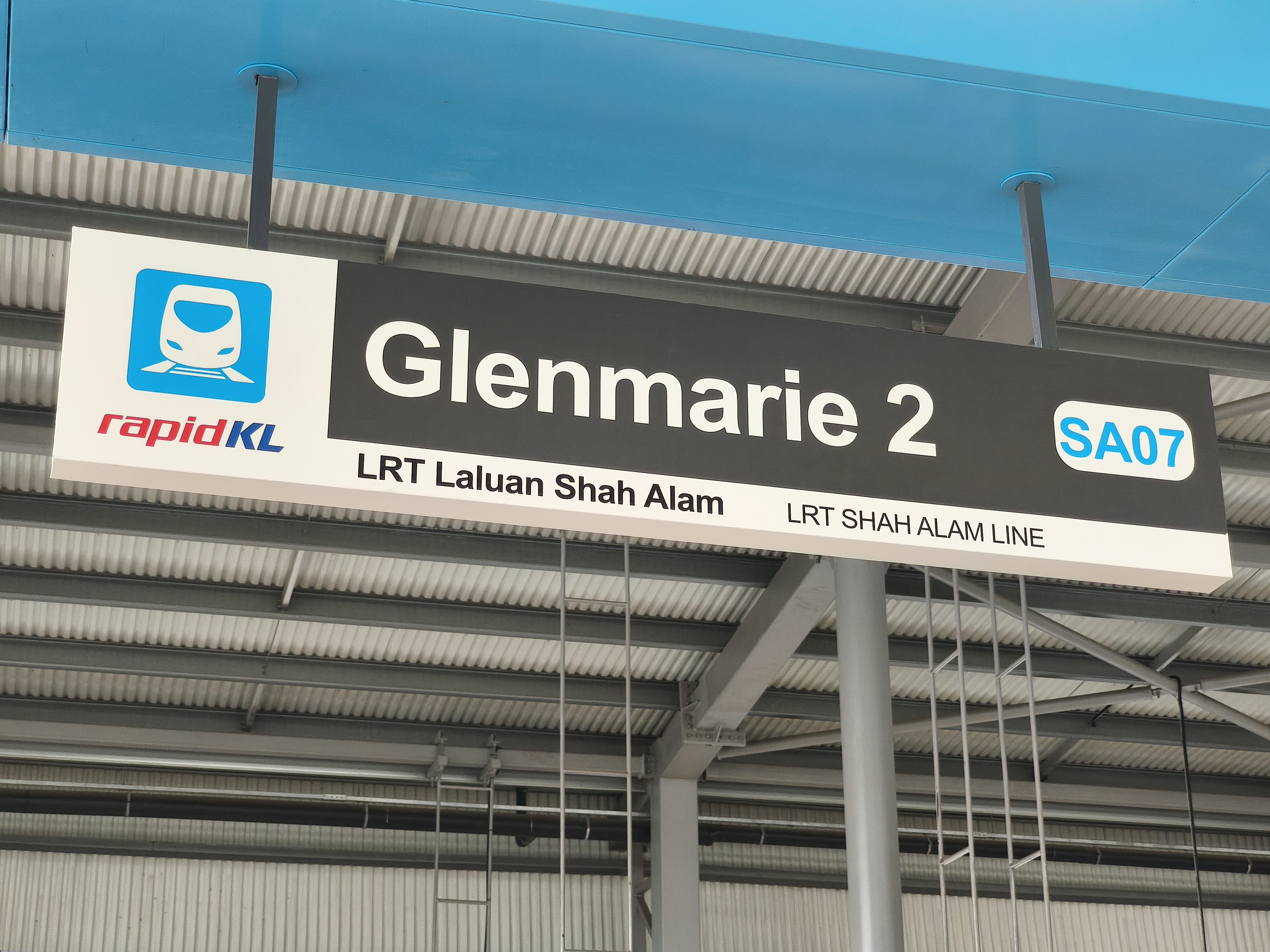
View of the platform signboard
