= Ara Damansara LRT station =

Light rapid transit station in Petaling Jaya, Selangor, Malaysia

KJ26 Ara Damansara
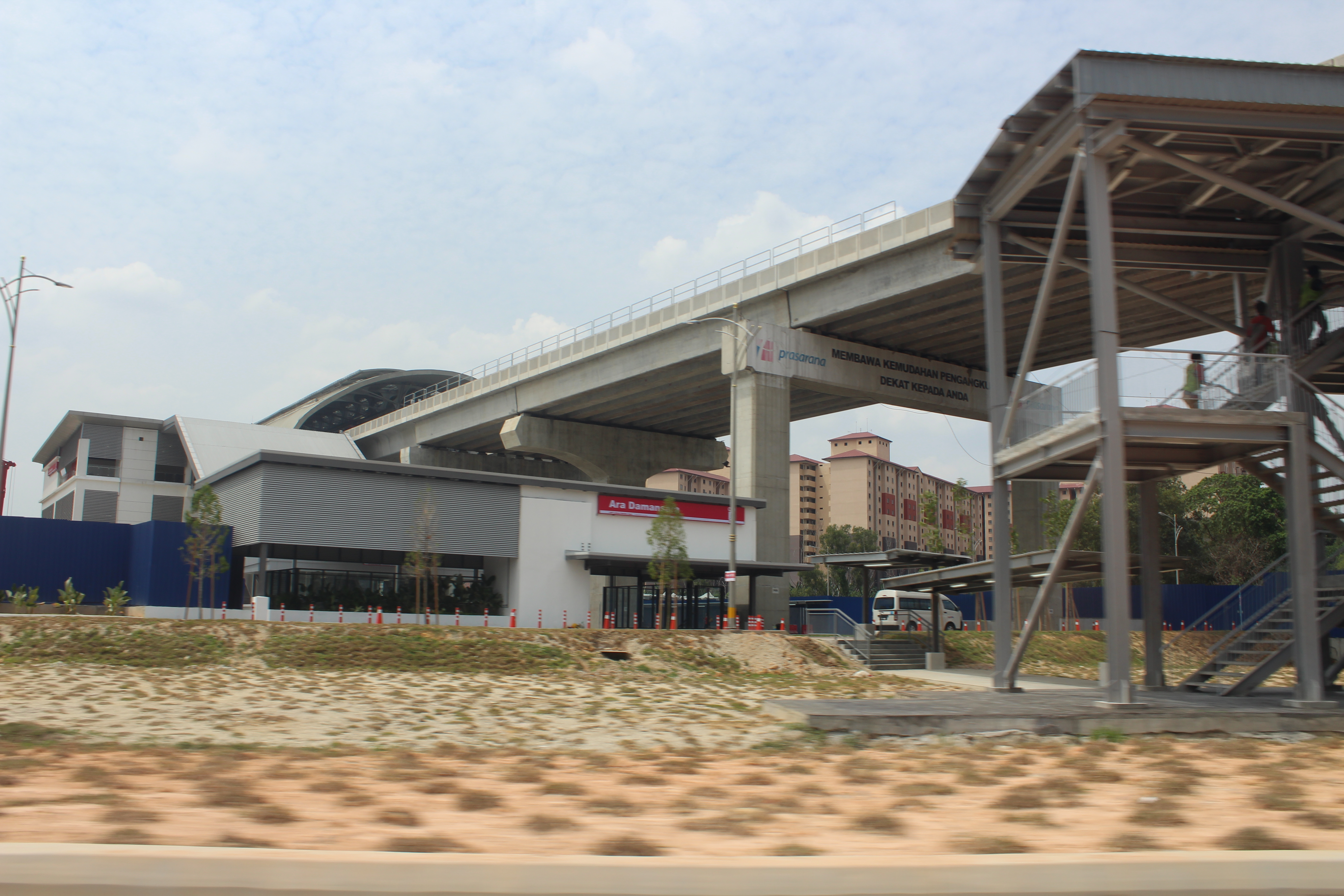
- Exterior view of the station

General information
- Other names: Malay: ارا دامنسارا (Jawi); Chinese: 阿拉白沙罗; Tamil: ஆரா டாமன்சாரா
- Location: Sultan Abdul Aziz Shah Airport Highway, Ara Damansara, PJU 1A, 47301 Petaling Jaya; Selangor; Malaysia
- Coordinates: 3°06′30.1″N 101°35′11.3″E
- System: Rapid KL
- Owner: Prasarana Malaysia
- Operator: Rapid Rail
- Line: 5 Kelana Jaya Line
- Platforms: 1 island platform
- Tracks: 2

Construction
- Structure type: Elevated
- Parking: Available with payment, 817 total multi-storey parking bays
- Cycle facilities: Available

Other information
- Station code: KJ26

History
- Opened: 30 June 2016; 10 years ago

Services
Preceding station		Following station
Lembah Subang towards Gombak	Kelana Jaya Line	Glenmarie towards Putra Heights
Location

Ara Damansara LRT station is a light rapid transit (LRT) station in Ara Damansara (PJU 1A), Petaling Jaya, Selangor, Malaysia. It is served by the LRT Kelana Jaya Line. Like most other LRT stations operating in the Klang Valley, this station is elevated.

The station has an entrance from the neighbourhood of Taman Mayang Emas near the Evolve Concept Mall and the Japanese School of Kuala Lumpur, and another entrance from the Sultan Abdul Aziz Shah Airport Highway which it faces.

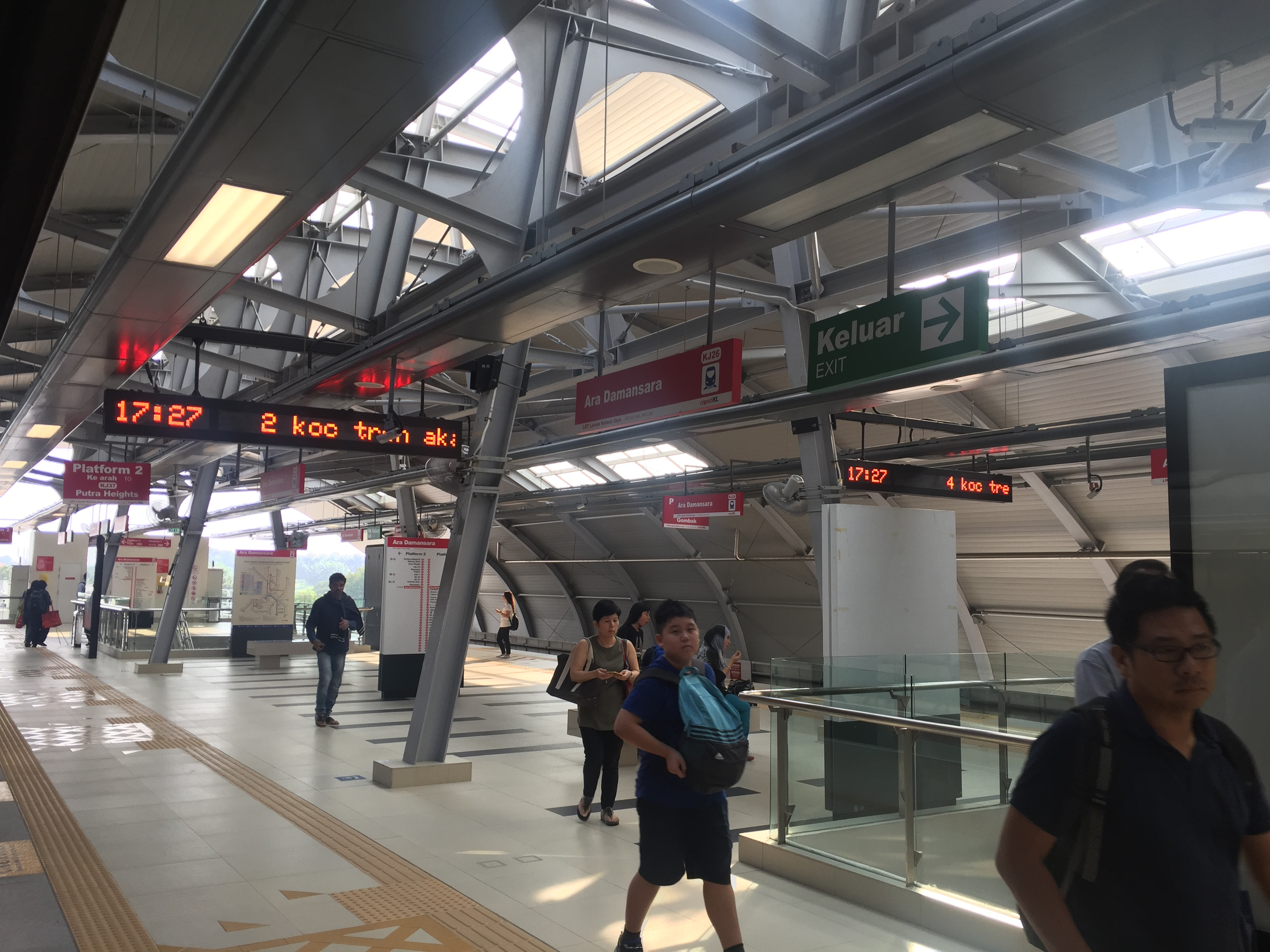
The island platform of the station

== Bus services ==
=== Feeder buses ===
Route No.	Origin	Desitination	Via	Connecting to
T773 (until 31 October 2020)	KJ26 Ara Damansara	Sultan Abdul Aziz Shah Airport / KS03 Terminal Skypark	Jalan Lapangan Terbang Subang	T772 to Kampung Melayu Subang and KJ14 KG16 Pasar Seni; T804 to KG05 Kwasa Sentral

=== Other buses ===
Route No.	Origin	Desitination	Via	Connecting to
772	KJ14 KG16 Pasar Seni station	Subang Suria	Jalan Tun Tan Cheng Lock; Jalan Tun Sambanthan (KL Sentral); Jalan Bangsar; KJ16 Bangsar; Federal Highway; KJ27 SA07 Glenmarie; KJ26 Ara Damansara; Sultan Abdul Aziz Shah Airport; Subang Perdana; Kampung Melayu Subang; Persiaran Galaksi; Jalan Utarid U5/27; Jalan Utarid U5/3; Persiaran Atmosphera	T802 T803
