= Subang, Selangor =

Subang
- Town and District capital
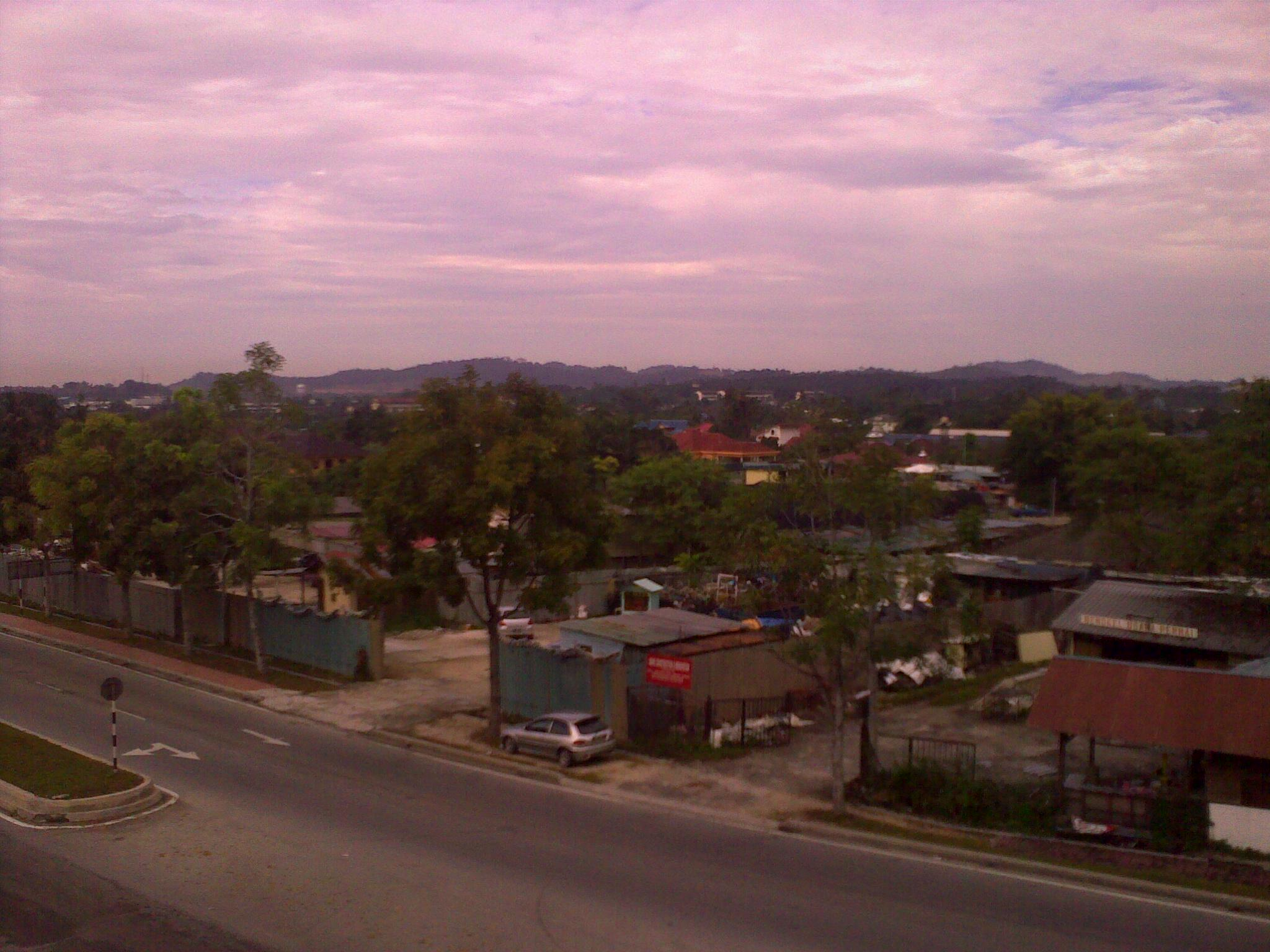

- Location in Peninsular Malaysia
- Coordinates: 3°9′1.75″N 101°31′52.15″E
- Country: Malaysia
- State: Selangor
- District: Petaling

Area
  - Total: 200 km^{2} (77 sq mi)
- Time zone: UTC+8 (MST)
- Postcode: 40150; 40160; 47200
- Calling code: +603-78, +603-61

Subang is a township in Petaling District, Selangor, Malaysia. It is located about 17 km west of downtown Kuala Lumpur.

It is home to the Sultan Abdul Aziz Shah Airport (Subang Skypark), the former international airport of Kuala Lumpur. The airport now serves domestic flights, as well as cargo and private aviation.

== Geography ==
Subang town falls within the local government area of the Shah Alam City Council (MBSA), corresponding to sections U3, U6 and U7. Clockwise from west to east, it is surrounded by Bukit Jelutong (Shah Alam), Sungai Buloh as well as the townships of Kwasa Damansara, Kota Damansara, Bandar Utama, Ara Damansara and Kelana Jaya (Petaling Jaya).

=== Subdivisions ===
==== Residential areas ====
As there are many golf courses nearby such as Glenmarie Golf and Country Club, Subang National Golf Club and it is home to the renowned Saujana Golf and Country Club, it is a strategic location for the premier neighbourhoods. These neighbourhoods include a range of houses from luxurious condominiums to villas, semi-detached and bungalows.

- Amaya Saujana
- Serai Saujana
- Lake View Saujana
- Glenhill Saujana
- Maplewoods Saujana
- Bunga Raya Condominium

== Economy ==
Subang town, being home to the Subang Airport, houses the headquarters of Malaysia Airlines, the Malaysian flag carrier, as well as its low-cost subsidiary Firefly. The complex is across the highway from the airport terminal.

Airbus has a maintenance centre just south of the Malaysia Airlines compound.

West of the airport runway, there is a small industrial area, along the road to the Royal Malaysian Air Force base.

The main commercial area of Subang town is in Taman Subang Perdana, containing several shoplots, located just to the north of the airport runway.

== Transportation ==
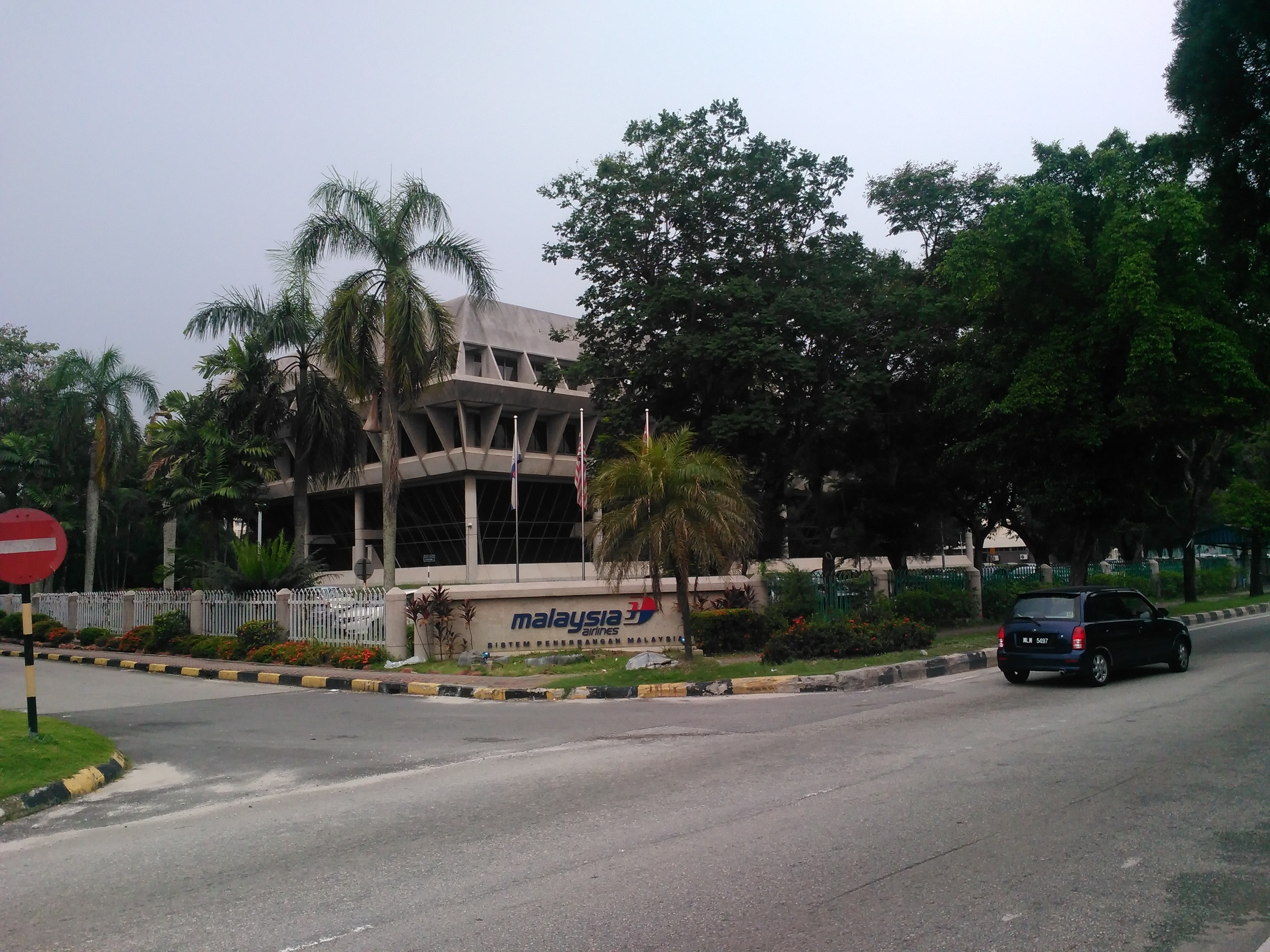
Malaysia Airlines head office

=== Air ===
Subang is home to the Sultan Abdul Aziz Shah Airport, a.k.a. Subang Skypark (IATA: SZB). It was Malaysia's principal international airport from 1965 to 1998, when it was replaced by the Kuala Lumpur International Airport in Sepang region. The airport still serves domestic flights and limited international flights by Firefly and Malindo Air. Private charter flights provided by Berjaya Air are also available.

The Subang Airport is also a major air cargo hub, operated by Raya Airways.

=== Rail and bus ===
Terminal Skypark Komuter station, on the KTM Komuter KL Sentral–Terminal Skypark Line, designed to connect Subang Airport to KL Sentral, is the main railway station in the area.

Rapid KL has 5 bus routes serving Subang town:

- 772: Subang Suria - Subang Perdana commercial centre - Subang Airport - LRT Ara Damansara (Kelana Jaya Line)
- T772: Bukit Subang - Subang Perdana commercial centre - MRT Kwasa Sentral (Kajang Line)
- T804: Subang Airport - MRT Kwasa Sentral (Kajang Line)
- T803: Subang Suria - MRT Kwasa Sentral (Kajang Line)
- T802: Subang Bestari - MRT Kwasa Sentral (Kajang Line)

=== Road ===
Subang town is mainly served by the Federal Route 15, which was built as a feeder road for the Subang Airport. The highway links Sungai Buloh in the north to Subang Jaya in the south.

The Guthrie toll road runs through the western border of Subang town.

Indirectly, the PLUS toll road serves Subang town with an interchange with national highway 15 at exit 104 . The exit is next to Ara Damansara LRT station.

== Education ==
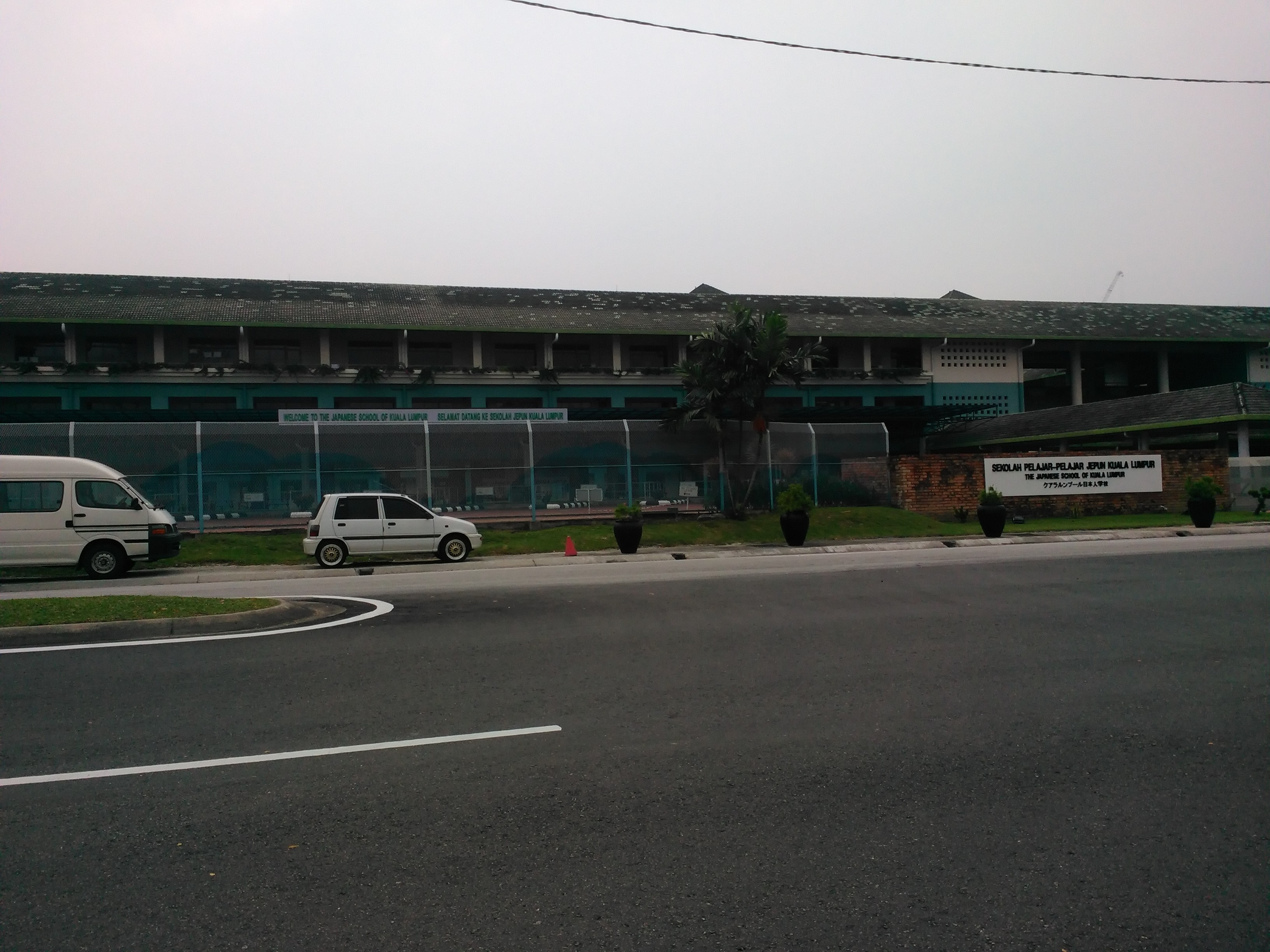
Japanese School of Kuala Lumpur

The Japanese School of Kuala Lumpur is located on the grounds of the Saujana Golf and Country Club in Subang.

== Weather ==
Subang is considered as the most thunderous place in Malaysia. According to Malaysian Meteorological Department:-

- Subang had the highest number of days with lightning in a year with 362 days in 1987.
- Subang has the highest mean annual number of days with thunderstorm with 262 days.
- Subang had the highest number of days with thunderstorms in a year with 269 days in 1969.

== Politics ==
Subang town falls within the Sungai Buloh parliamentary constituency, currently represented by Sivarasa Rasiah (PH-PKR).

On the state level, Subang town is within the borders of the Kota Damansara state constituency. It is currently held by Shatiri Mansor (PH-PKR).
