= Japanese School of Kuala Lumpur =

- クアラルンプール日本人学校; Sekolah Pelajar-Pelajar Jepun Kuala Lumpur

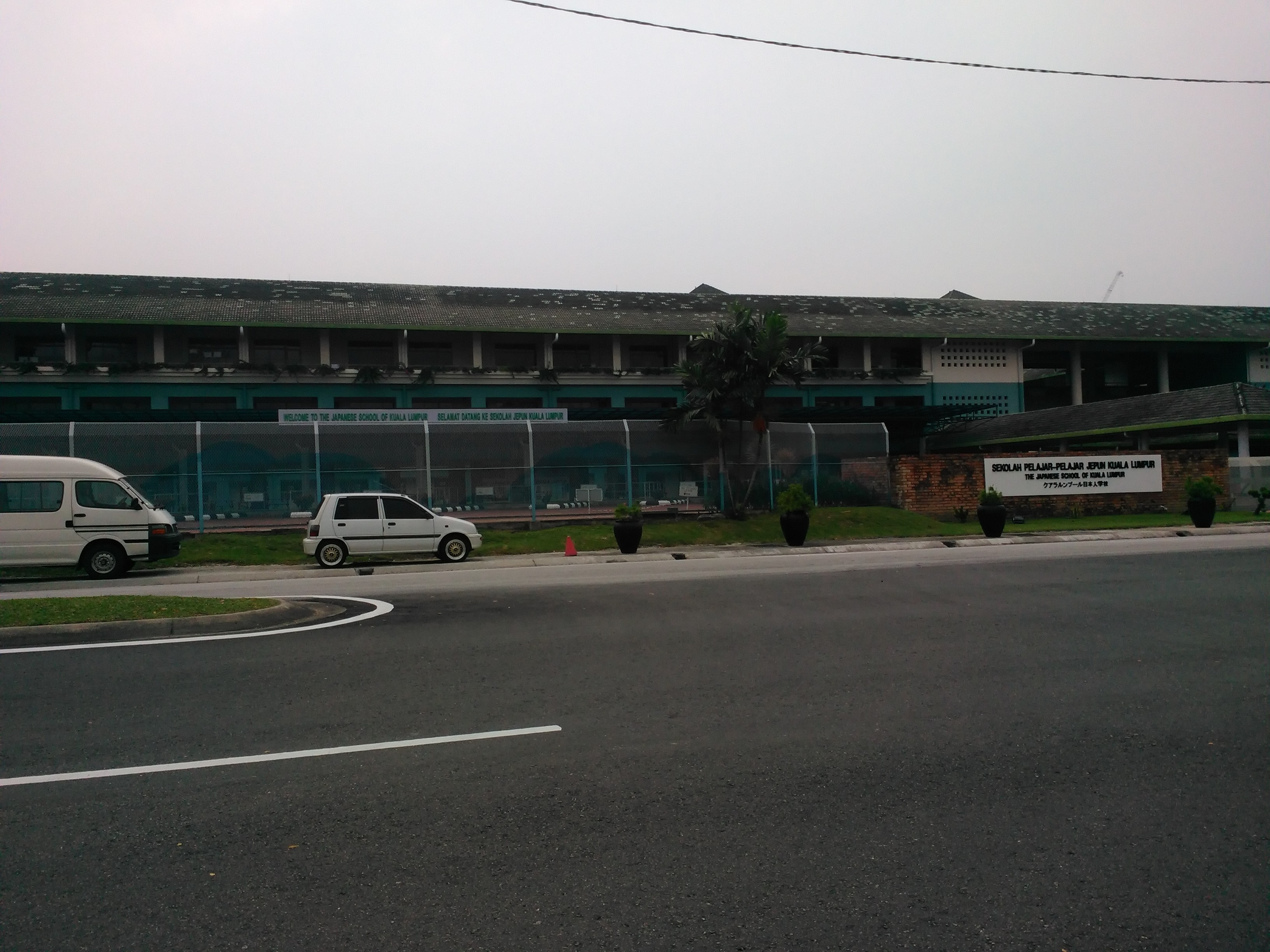

Location
- Saujana Resort Seksyen U2, 40150, Selangor Darul Ehsan, Malaysia; 3.1094693°N 101.57855990000007°E

Information
- Type: Private, international school
- Established: 1966; 60 years ago
- Headmaster: Yasuhiko Seto
- Website: jskl.edu.my

The Japanese School of Kuala Lumpur (JSKL; Japanese: クアラルンプール日本人学校, Kuararunpūru Nihonjin Gakkō, Malay: Sekolah Pelajar-Pelajar Jepun Kuala Lumpur) is a Japanese international school in Saujana Golf and Country Club in Subang, Selangor, Malaysia. The school uses the Japanese Education Curriculum as its syllabus. The school was established by the Japan Club of Kuala Lumpur.

== History ==
JSKL was established in 1966, being initially based at Jalan Kia Peng. In 1976, it moved to new premises at Taman Seputeh. JSKL moved to its current premises in Subang in April 1993, while the Taman Seputeh premise was reused as the clubhouse of Japan Club of Kuala Lumpur in January 1995.

== See also ==
- List of schools in Selangor

== Sources ==
- 現代アジア事典 (in Japanese), Bunshindo (文眞堂), 2009, p. 321, ISBN 9784830946493
