= Ara Damansara =

- Township

Other transcription(s)
  - Jawi: ارا دامنسارا
  - Chinese: 阿拉白沙罗
- Seal

- Location in Selangor, Malaysia Ara Damansara (Malaysia)
- Coordinates: 3°07′28″N 101°34′59″E
- Country: Malaysia
- State: Selangor
- District: Petaling
- Establishment: 1999

Government
  - Type: City Council
  - Body: Majlis Bandaraya Petaling Jaya (Petaling Jaya City Council)
  - Councillor: Mohd Ikhshan Mohamad Din

Area
  - Total: 2.99 km^{2} (1.15 sq mi)
- Time zone: UTC+8 (MST)
- Website: www.aradamansaranow.com

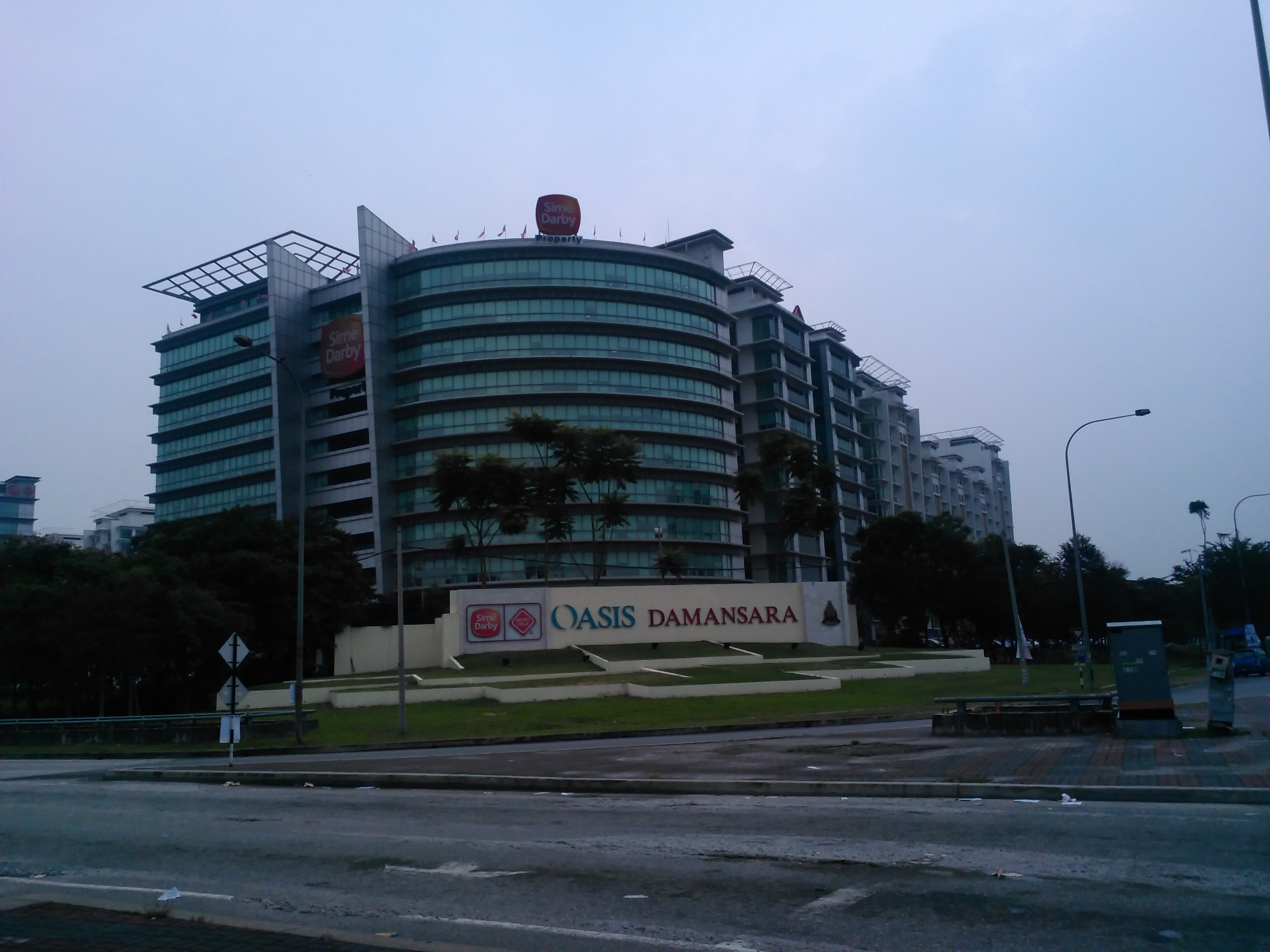
The Sime Darby headquarters located in Oasis Damansara

Ara Damansara is a residential township in Petaling Jaya, Petaling District, Selangor, Malaysia. It is located along Federal Route 15.

== History ==
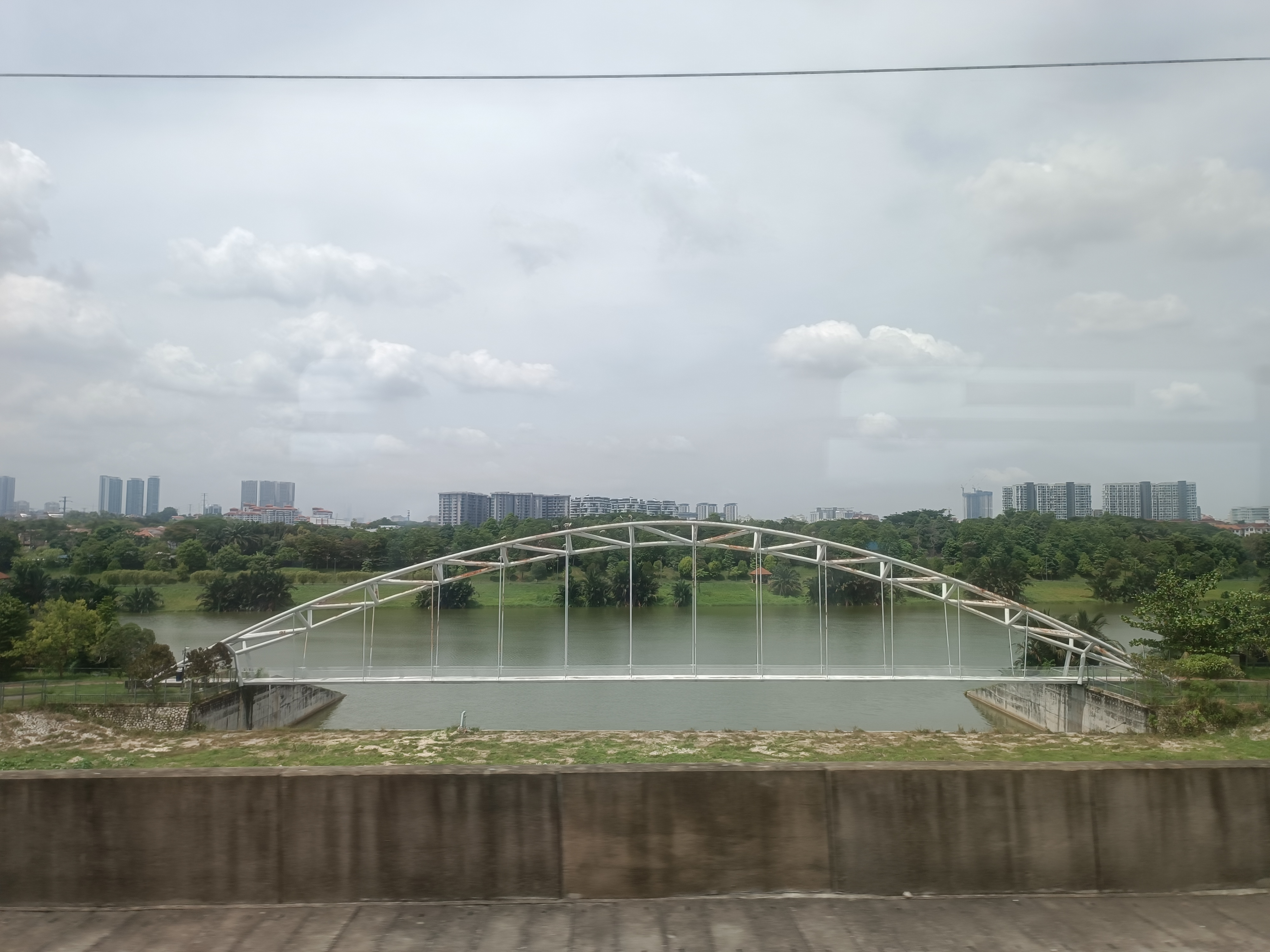
Ara Damansara eco park

Ara Damansara was first developed in 1999 by Sime Pilmoor Development. The development plan includes approximately 4,000 units of various property types.

== Surrounding Area and Accessibility ==
Ara Damansara spans 739 acres (2.99 km²) and is situated along the Subang Airport Highway (Federal Route 15) in Petaling Jaya. The township is located near several major highways, including the New Klang Valley Expressway (NKVE), Subang Airport Highway, and Puncak Alam Highway. Surrounding areas include Kota Damansara to the north, Taman Tun Dr Ismail to the east, Subang Jaya to the south, and Kayangan Height to the west.

Accessibility to Ara Damansara is facilitated by the Subang Airport Highway and the Subang Kelana-Link interchange. Additional access is provided through the New Klang Valley Expressway tunnel via Crimson Condominium to the Damansara–Puchong Expressway (LDP). The eastern portion of Ara Damansara connects to Persiaran Tropicana, offering access to commercial areas.

== Public transport ==
=== Train ===
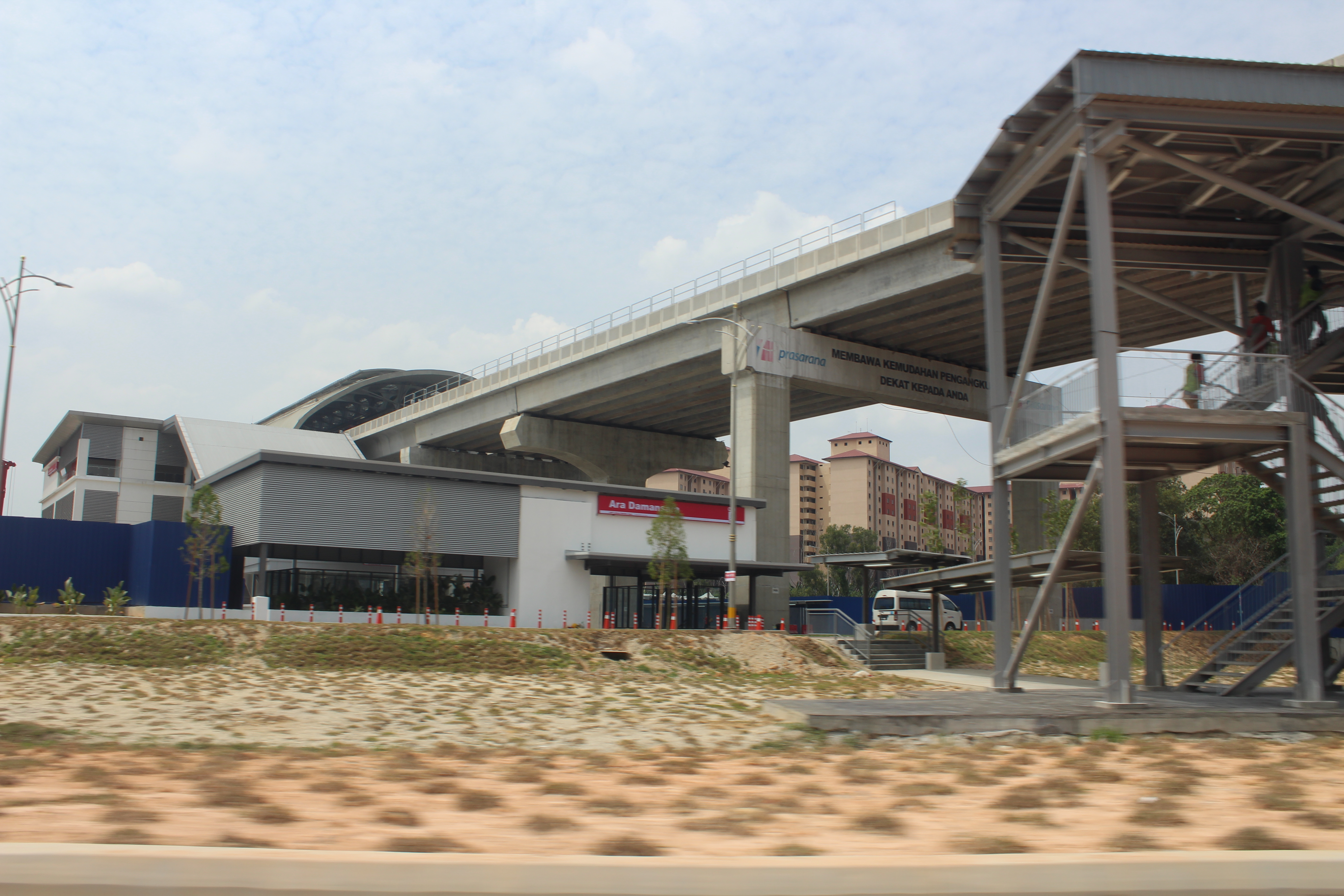
Ara Damansara LRT station.

Ara Damansara is connected to the Light Rail Transit (LRT) Kelana Jaya Line with three stations nearby; Ara Damansara LRT Station, Glenmarie LRT Station and Lembah Subang LRT Station.

=== Bus ===
Feeder bus services around these stations help connect the township with the surrounding areas; they connect Ara Damansara LRT station to Sultan Abdul Aziz Shah Airport, while buses from Lembah Subang LRT station connect to Surian MRT station and circulate around Ara Damansara.

== Facilities ==
Ara Damansara Park is located in the center of the township and has a 2 kilometre long walking path. Ara Damansara has a number of private hospitals and medical clinics. The township has a primary school, a secondary school, an international school and several pre-schools and kindergartens. It also has 2 post offices.
