= Kota Kemuning National Secondary School =

- Sekolah Menengah Kebangsaan Kota Kemuning
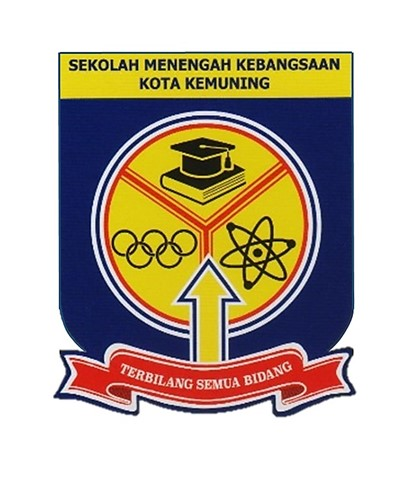

Location
- Jalan Anggerik Doritis 31/143, Kota Kemuning, 40460 Shah Alam, Selangor; Shah Alam, Selangor; Malaysia

Information
- Type: Secondary school High School
- Motto: Terbilang Semua Bidang
- Established: 2002
- School district: Klang
- Session: Morning & Afternoon
- School code: BEA0108
- Principal: Mohd Fauzi Bin Zailan
- Staff: 11 staff (2014)
- Teaching staff: 155 Teachers (2014)
- Grades: Peralihan - Form 5
- Age range: 13-17 years old
- Enrollment: 3660 Students (October 2023)
- Language: Malay, English, Mandarin Chinese, Tamil
- Classrooms: 18 (Aranda - Westara), (ST1-ST7 & SK1-SK11)
- Colours: Blue, Yellow and Red
- Yearbook: Kemuning Permai
- Affiliations: Ministry Of Education Malaysia

Kota Kemuning National Secondary School (Malay: Sekolah Menengah Kebangsaan Kota Kemuning), is a national secondary school which is located in Kota Kemuning, Shah Alam, Selangor, Malaysia. As of 2020, this school holds more than 3000 students from around Kota Kemuning, Bukit Rimau, west of Jalan Kebun area, Alam Impian, Kemuning Utama and even from the city of Klang.

== History ==
Sekolah Menengah Kebangsaan Kota Kemuning (previously known as Sekolah Menengah Kebangsaan Bukit Kemuning) started their school session on 7 January 2002. The name of the school is by geographical location, Kota Kemuning.

The construction of the school is managed by the property development company HICOM-Gamuda Development Sdn. Bhd. (joint venture between DRB-HICOM and Gamuda Land) and on 15 November 2001, the ownership of the school was then handed over to Klang District Education Department (PPD Daerah Klang) of the Selangor Education Department (Jabatan Pendidikan Negeri Selangor - JPNS) which is under the governance of the Ministry of Education to be officialise as a school.

By 18 January 2002, the school only served students in the morning session as well as having 168 students and 16 teachers excluding the first principal of the school Tuan Haji Mohammed Nashan bin Singgan. The school till today remains under the Klang District Education Department even though geographically located under the jurisdiction of the Shah Alam City Council. The initial plan of the infrastructure is to cater 1500 students into 44 classrooms.

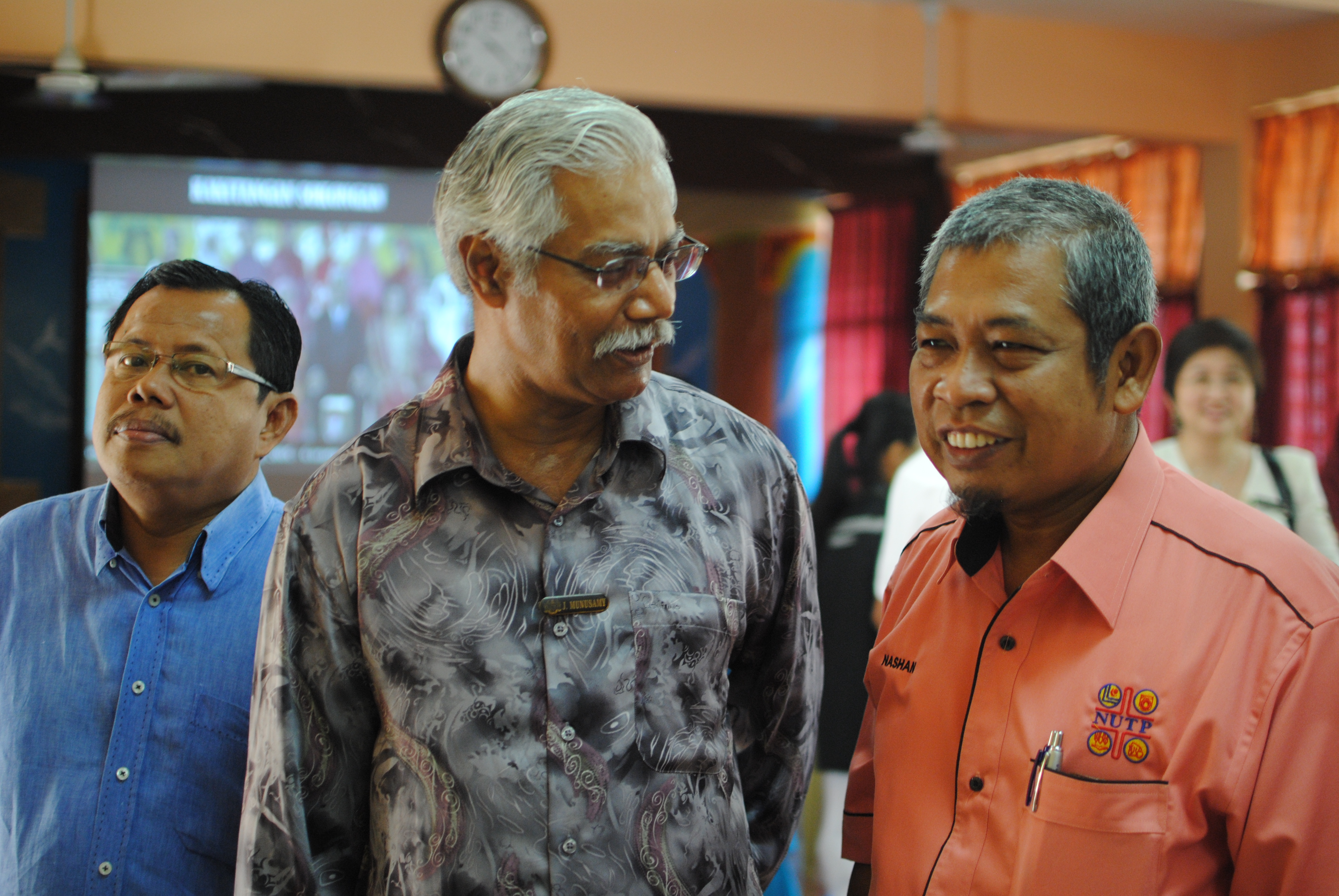
Mr.Munusamy (centre) looks on to Tuan Haji Mohammed Nashan Singgan (right) during the 10th Year Anniversary of SMK Kota Kemuning.

== Construction of new school ==
SMK Kota Kemuning has been one of the best schools in the Township of Kota Kemuning, this results in the over 3000 students that are attending this school. This has inevitably brought up the issue of overcrowding.

This issue was addressed by constructing an awning, adding more classes and new blocks, et cetera. Although all this initiatives have been taken, this issue still remains a challenge, so former Education Minister Datuk Seri Mahdzir Khalid said the project was first announced in 2013 under a Public Private Partnership (PPP) programme to accommodate the growing number of students in the township through the construction of SMK Kota Kemuning 2. However, the construction of SMK Kota Kemuning 2 has not been initiated yet.

== See also ==
- List of schools in Selangor
- Lists of schools in Malaysia
- Education in Malaysia

== Gallery ==
SMK Kota Kemuning Highlights
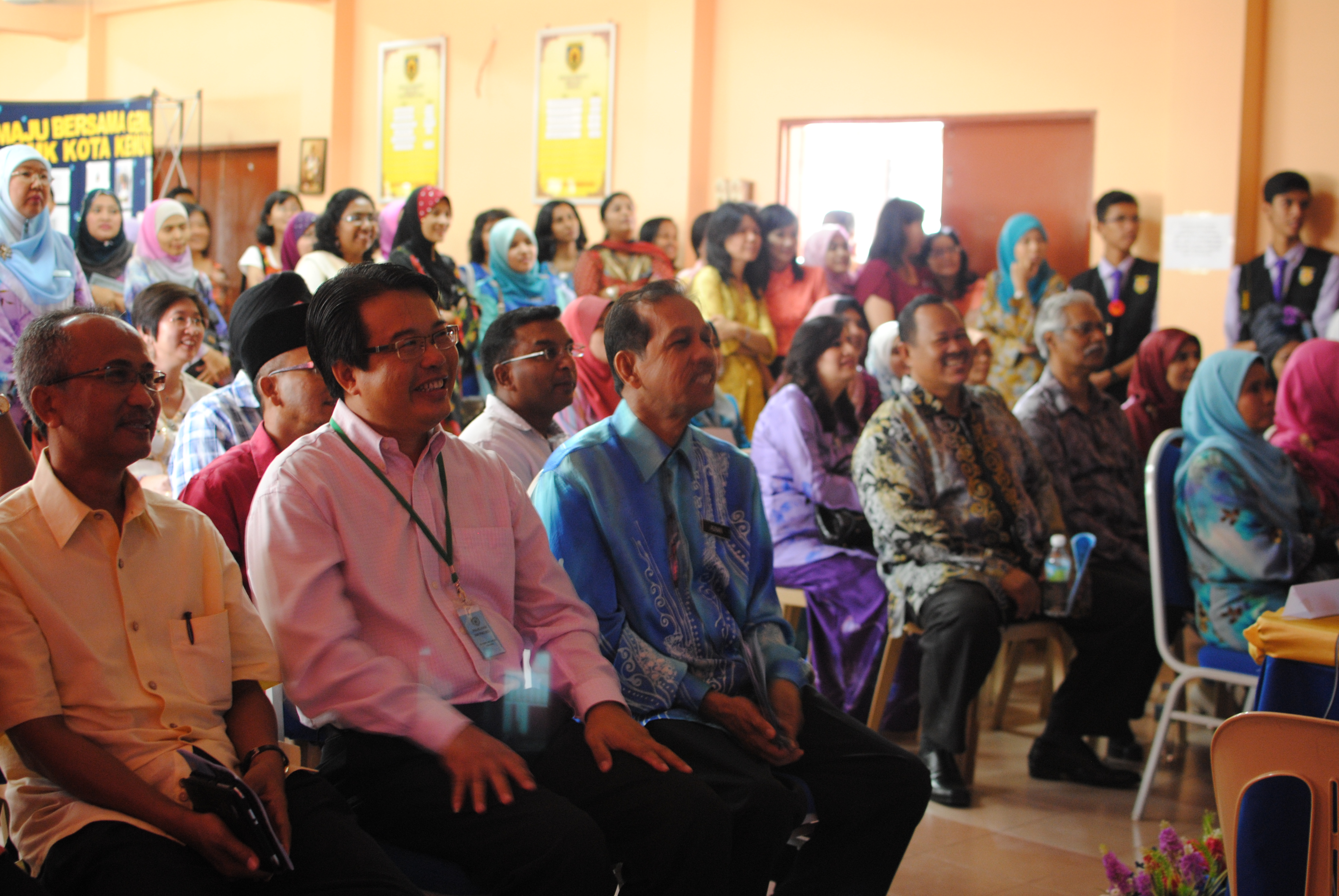
Mr. Kuan Chee Kheong, teachers and VIPs watching a video about the 10th Year Anniversary of SMK Kota Kemuning.
