= Malaysia Federal Route 190 =

Road in Malaysia

Federal Route 190
- Jalan Kota Raja; Jalan Sungai Kandis; Jalan Bukit Kemuning

Route information
- Maintained by Malaysian Public Works Department
- Length: 17.00 km (10.56 mi)

Major junctions
- West end: Klang
- Jalan Kampung Jawa; Jalan Raja Nong; B5 State Route B5; FT 190 Jalan Kebun; Kemuning–Shah Alam Highway; Persiaran Budiman; Shah Alam Expressway; FT 286 Federal Route 286
- East end: Shah Alam; Hicom

Location
- Country: Malaysia
- Primary destinations: Bukit Badak, Sungai Kandis, Bukit Kemuning, Taman Sri Muda, Kota Kemuning

Highway system
- Highways in Malaysia; Expressways; Federal; State

Federal Route 190, consisting of Jalan Kota Raja, Jalan Sungai Kandis and Jalan Bukit Kemuning (formerly Selangor State Route B3 and B12), is a federal road in Klang Valley region, Selangor, Malaysia. It is also a main route to Klang from Puchong, Kota Kemuning and Bukit Rimau.

The Kilometre Zero of the Federal Route 190 starts at Klang Town Centre.

== Features ==
At most sections, the Federal Route 190 was built under the JKR R5 road standard, allowing maximum speed limit of up to 90 km/h (56 mph).

== Junction lists ==
The entire route is located in Selangor.

Legend:

- I/C - Interchange, I/S - Intersection, RSA - Rest and service area, OBR - Overhead bridge restaurant, R/R - Restaurant and rest plaza, L/B - Layby, V/P - Vista point, TN - tunnel, T/P - Toll plaza, BR - Bridge
- C - Cloverleaf, S - Stack, T-A - Trumpet-A, T-B - Trumpet-B, DT - Directional-T/Y, SDT - Semi-Directional-T/Y, P-Y - Partial-Y, D - Diamond, P-C - Partial cloverleaf, D-D - Diverging diamond, D-R - Direct ramp

District	Location	km	mi	Name	Destinations	Notes
Klang	Klang			Klang	Klang Komuter station Jalan Stesyen	T-junctions
Klang	Klang	0.0	0.0	Klang	Jalan Dato' Hamzah – Istana Alam Shah, Gedung Raja Abdullah, Galeri Diraja Sultan Abdul Aziz Shah Klang, Town Centre, Banting, Port Klang	T-junctions
Klang	Klang			Sultan Sulaiman Mosque	Sultan Sulaiman Mosque and the Royal Mausoleum	
Klang	Klang			Sultan Alam Shah Islamic College		
Klang	Bukit Badak			Kampung Jawa	Jalan Kampung Jawa	Junctions
Klang	Bukit Badak			Jalan Raja Nong	Jalan Raja Nong – Taman Sri Andalas, Pandamaran	Junctions
Klang	Bukit Badak			Jalan Dato' Mohd Sidin	B5 Selangor State Route B5 – Jalan Batu Tiga Lama, Bukit Kuda, Padang Jawa	T-junctions
Klang	Bukit Badak			Kampung Bukit Badak		
Klang	Bukit Badak			Kampung Teluk Menegun		
Klang	Bukit Badak			Sungai Teluk Menegun bridge		
Klang	Bukit Badak			Desa Latania		
Klang	Sungai Kandis			Kampung Sungai Kandis	Jalan Siswi Kanan – Alam Impian	T-junctions
Klang	Sungai Kandis			Taman Kandis Permai		
Klang	Sungai Kandis			Jalan Batu 4	Jalan Batu 4 – Alam Impian	T-junctions
Klang	Sungai Kandis			Sungai Kandis Roundabout	Jalan Uganda (Jalan Sungai Jati) – Taman Sri Andalas, Pandamaran, Banting; FT 190 Jalan Kebun – Kampung Jalan Kebun, Bukit Rimau; Shah Alam Expressway – Pulau Indah, West Port, South Port, North Port, Subang Jaya, Petaling Jaya, Sri Petaling, Kuala Lumpur, Cheras, Kuantan, Kuala Lumpur International Airport (KLIA), Johor Bahru	Roundabout
Klang	Kota Kemuning			Kampung Bukit Naga		
Klang	Kota Kemuning			Kampung Bukit Kemuning		
Klang	Kota Kemuning			Jalan Bukit Rimau (Alternative route to Kota Kemuning)	Jalan Bukit Rimau – Kota Kemuning, Kota Kemuning Golf and Country Club, Bukit Rimau	T-junctions
Klang	Kota Kemuning			Jalan Bukit Kemuning-LKSA	Kemuning–Shah Alam Highway – Shah Alam, Alam Impian	Interchange
Klang	Kota Kemuning			Taman Sri Muda (Section 25)	Persiaran Budiman – Taman Sri Muda (Section 25), Shah Alam, Section 1 until 24, Kemuning Utama	T-junctions
Klang	Kota Kemuning			Section 26 underpass	Jalan Bukit Meru – Taman Sri Muda (Section 25), Section 33, Kemuning Utama	Underpass junctions
Klang–Petaling district border				Sungai Klang bridge		
Petaling	Shah Alam	17.00	10.56	Shah Alam; Hicom	FT 286 Malaysia Federal Route 286/Persiaran Kuala Selangor – Shah Alam, Section 1 until 24, Hicom Industrial Area, Section—until -- Damansara–Puchong Expressway – Puchong, Putrajaya, Cyberjaya; Shah Alam Expressway – Kota Kemuning, Klang, Pulau Indah, West Port, South Port, North Port, Subang Jaya, Petaling Jaya, Sri Petaling, Kuala Lumpur, Cheras, Kuantan, Kuala Lumpur International Airport (KLIA), Johor Bahru	Diamond interchange
1.000 mi = 1.609 km; 1.000 km = 0.621 mi
