= Selangor State Route B10 =

Road in Selangor, Malaysia

Selangor Route 10
- Jalan Johan Setia 佐汉瑟迪亚路

Route information
- Maintained by Malaysian Public Works Department

Major junctions
- West end: Klang–Banting Highway
- FT 3218 Federal Route 3218; FT 5 Klang–Banting Highway; FT 190 Jalan Kebun
- East end: Jalan Kebun

Location
- Country: Malaysia
- Primary destinations: Taman Johan Setia Permai, Taman Johan Setia, Taman Setia

Highway system
- Highways in Malaysia; Expressways; Federal; State

Selangor State Route B10, Jalan Johan Setia is a major road in Selangor, Malaysia.

== History ==
At 3 pm of 20 July 2020, the boring of piles for the construction of the Shah Alam line (SAL/LRT3) project caused the Soil erosion and sedimentation in FT5 Klang–Banting Highway (Jalan Klang–Banting), near Pandamaran Road-Johan Setia Road intersections.

The Public Works Department (JKR) ordered to closed the Klang–Banting Highway from Banting to Klang closed emergency 72 hours for repairing.

== Junction list ==
The entire route is located in Klang District, Selangor.

Legend:

- I/C - Interchange, I/S - Intersection, RSA - Rest and service area, OBR - Overhead bridge restaurant, R/R - Restaurant and rest plaza, L/B - Layby, V/P - Vista point, TN - tunnel, T/P - Toll plaza, BR - Bridge
- C - Cloverleaf, S - Stack, T-A - Trumpet-A, T-B - Trumpet-B, DT - Directional-T/Y, SDT - Semi-Directional-T/Y, P-Y - Partial-Y, D - Diamond, P-C - Partial cloverleaf, D-D - Diverging diamond, D-R - Direct ramp

Location	km	mi	Name	Destinations	Notes
Johan Setia			Klang–Banting Highway	FT 3218 Jalan Pandamaran – Pandamaran, Port Klang; FT 5 (Klang–Banting Highway) – Klang, Bandar Bukit Tinggi, Bandar Botanic, Telok Panglima Garang, Banting; Shah Alam Expressway – Pulau Indah, West Port, South Port, North Port, Subang Jaya, Petaling Jaya, Sri Petaling, Kuala Lumpur, Cheras, Kuantan, Kuala Lumpur International Airport (KLIA), Johor Bahru	Junctions
Johan Setia			Taman Johan Setia Permai		
Johan Setia			Taman Wira Setia		
Johan Setia			Taman Johan Setia		
Johan Setia			Taman Setia		
Johan Setia			Jalan Stesen VHF Klang	Klang VHF Stations Road – Klang VHF Stations	T-junctions
Johan Setia			Jalan Kebun	FT 190 Jalan Kebun – Klang, Bukit Kemuning, Shah Alam, Kampung Jalan Kebun, Kampung Bukit Komandol; Shah Alam Expressway – Pulau Indah, West Port, South Port, North Port, Subang Jaya, Petaling Jaya, Sri Petaling, Kuala Lumpur, Cheras, Kuantan, Kuala Lumpur International Airport (KLIA), Johor Bahru	Junctions
1.000 mi = 1.609 km; 1.000 km = 0.621 mi
