= Malaysia Federal Route 3216 =

Road in Malaysia

Federal Route 3216
- Jalan Batu Tiga Lama

Route information
- Maintained by Malaysian Public Works Department
- Length: 4.7 km (2.9 mi)

Major junctions
- East end: Batu Tiga; Carlsberg refinery
- FT 2 Federal Highway; FT 3214 Shah Alam–Puchong Highway; Kemuning–Shah Alam Highway (Persiaran Sultan); Persiaran Raja Muda; Persiaran Kemajuan; Jalan Padang Jawa; New North Klang Straits Bypass / FT 20; B5 Jalan Dato' Mohd Sidin
- West end: Klang

Location
- Country: Malaysia
- Primary destinations: Padang Jawa

Highway system
- Highways in Malaysia; Expressways; Federal; State

Federal Route 3216, which consists of Jalan Batu Tiga Lama (formerly Selangor State Route B6), Jalan Sungai Rasau and Persiaran Selangor, is an industrial federal road in Klang Valley regions, Selangor, Malaysia. It is a toll free road.

The Kilometre Zero is located at Klang.

At most sections, the Federal Route 3216 was built under the JKR U4 road standard, allowing maximum speed limit of up to 60 km/h.

== Junction lists ==
The entire route is located in Selangor.

Legend:

- I/C - Interchange, I/S - Intersection, RSA - Rest and service area, OBR - Overhead bridge restaurant, R/R - Restaurant and rest plaza, L/B - Layby, V/P - Vista point, TN - tunnel, T/P - Toll plaza, BR - Bridge
- C - Cloverleaf, S - Stack, T-A - Trumpet-A, T-B - Trumpet-B, DT - Directional-T/Y, SDT - Semi-Directional-T/Y, P-Y - Partial-Y, D - Diamond, P-C - Partial cloverleaf, D-D - Diverging diamond, D-R - Direct ramp

District	Location	km	mi	Name	Destinations	Notes
Petaling	Section 15			Batu Tiga		From Federal Highway only
Petaling	Section 15			Carlsberg refinery		
Petaling	Section 15			Goodyear tyre factory		
Petaling	Section 15			Bulatan Sejahtera	FT 3214 Shah Alam–Puchong Highway/Persiaran Tengku Ampuan – Shah Alam city centre, Section 1 until 13, Section 21 until 32, Hicom; Damansara–Puchong Expressway – Puchong, Putrajaya, Cyberjaya	Roundabout
Petaling	Section 15			Section 15		
Petaling	Section 15			Bulatan Selangor	Kemuning–Shah Alam Highway (Persiaran Sultan) – Shah Alam city centre, Section 1 until 13, Universiti Teknologi MARA (UiTM), Section 16 until 21, Kota Kemuning, Pulau Indah, Kuala Lumpur International Airport (KLIA), USJ; FT 2 Federal Highway – Kuala Lumpur, Klang	Roundabout
Petaling	Section 15			Volvo		
Petaling	Section 15			Royal Mint		
Petaling	Section 15			Bulatan Perusahaan	Persiaran Raja Muda – Shah Alam city centre, Section 1 until 13, Universiti Teknologi MARA (UiTM), Section 16 until 21	Roundabout
Petaling	Section 16			Masjid Jamek Raja Tun Uda		
Petaling	Section 16			Bulatan Kemajuan	Persiaran Kemajuan – Section 16 until 21	Roundabout
Petaling	Section 16			CCM Refinery		
Klang	Padang Jawa			Padang Jawa	Jalan Padang Jawa – Shah Alam city centre, Section 1 until 13, Universiti Teknologi MARA (UiTM), Padang Jawa, P&R Padang Jawa Komuter station FT 2 Federal Highway – Kuala Lumpur, Klang	Junctions
Klang	MBSA–MBKlg			MBSA–MBKlg border limit		
Klang	Sungai Rasau			Sungai Rasau	FT 2 Federal Highway – Klang	T-junctions
Klang	Sungai Rasau			North Klang Straits Bypass	New North Klang Straits Bypass / FT 20 – Port Klang, Kapar, Meru, Ipoh, Kuala Lumpur	T-junctions
Klang	Sungai Rasau			Jalan Dato' Mohd Sidin	B5 Jalan Dato' Mohd Sidin – Bukit Badak, Sungai Kandis, Jalan Bukit Kemuning	Junctions
Klang	Sungai Rasau			Bukit Kuda	Jalan Bukit Kuda	
Klang	Sungai Rasau			Berkeley Garden	Berkeley Garden; FT 2 Federal Highway – Kuala Lumpur, Klang	Junctions
Klang	Klang			Klang Centro		
Klang	Klang			Klang Chinese Temple		
Klang	Klang			Klinik Kesihatan Bukit Kuda		
Klang	Klang	0.0	0.0	Klang	Jalan Batu Tiga – Klang Town Centre	
1.000 mi = 1.609 km; 1.000 km = 0.621 mi: Incomplete access
