= Kota Kemuning Lakeside Park =

Park in Selangor

Kota Kemuning Lakeside Park Taman Tasik Kota Kemuning
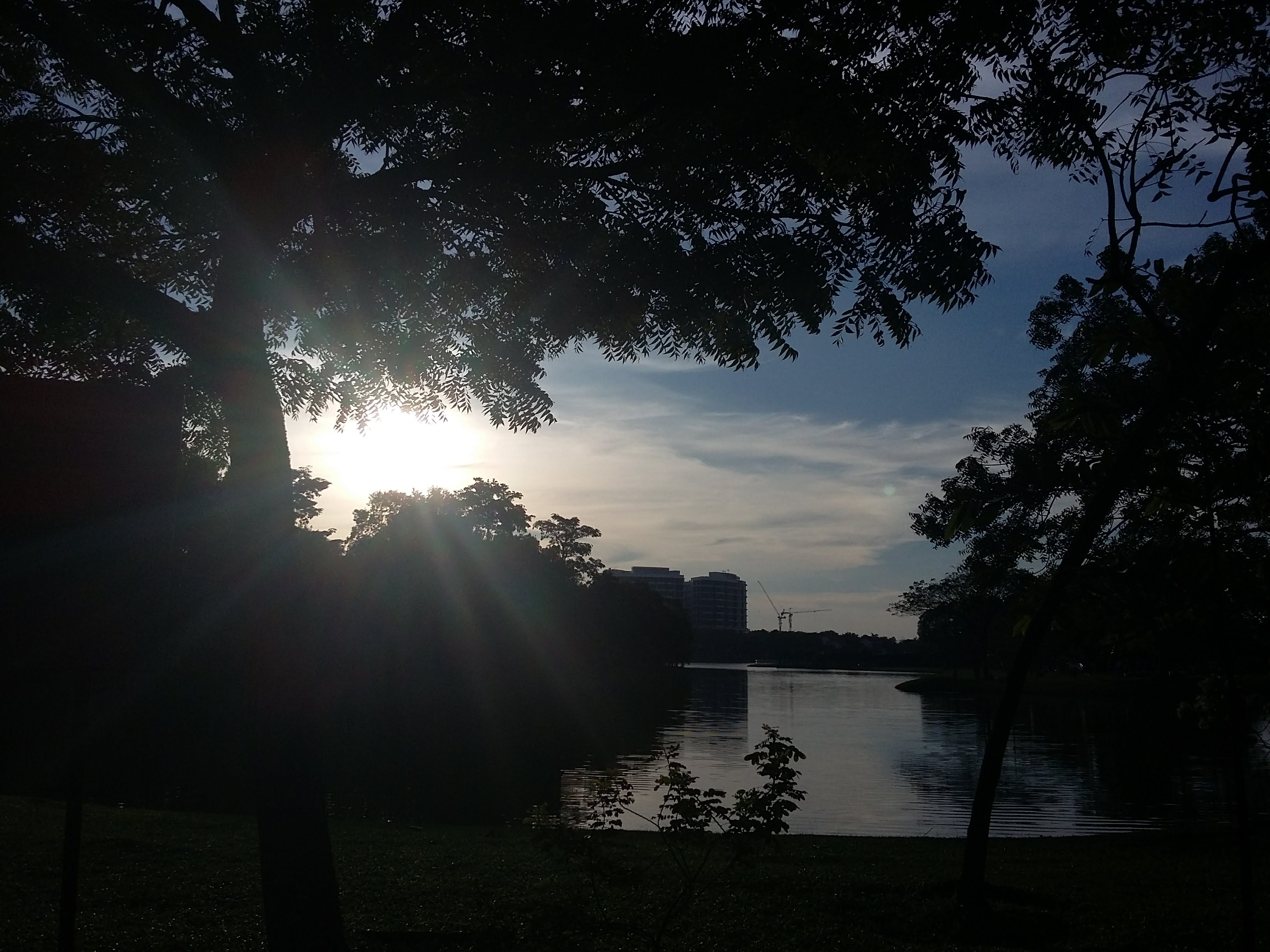
- Interactive map of Kota Kemuning Lakeside Park; Taman Tasik Kota Kemuning
- Type: Public Park
- Location: Kota Kemuning, 40460 Shah Alam, Selangor
- Coordinates: 3.155647°N 101.714997°E
- Area: 25 acres (10 ha)
- Created: 1994
- Operator: Gamuda Land
- Status: Open all year

The Kota Kemuning Lakeside Park (Malay: Taman Tasik Kota Kemuning) is an urban park in Kota Kemuning, Shah Alam. The park has been designed to provide greenery to Kota Kemuning and the areas surrounding it.

== Park Features ==
The park features a 22-acre (8.9 ha) lake surrounded by 25 acres (10 ha) of land.

A children's playground is also located in the park which is covered with EPDM, a special rubberised material for comfort and safety.

The park also features a 2-kilometre (1.2 mi) jogging track.
