= Malaysia Federal Route 3214 =

Road in Malaysia

Federal Route 3214

Route information
- Maintained by Malaysian Public Works Department
- Length: 38.7 km (24.0 mi)
- History: Split into two main federal roads in 2025

Major junctions
- North end: Subang
- FT 15 Federal Route 15; Guthrie Corridor Expressway New Klang Valley Expressway / AH2 / AH141; B9 State Route B9; FT 3213 Persiaran Kerjaya; FT 2 Federal Highway; North–South Expressway Central Link / AH2; Persiaran Jubli Perak; Shah Alam Expressway; Persiaran Klang; Damansara–Puchong Expressway
- South end: Puchong

Location
- Country: Malaysia
- Primary destinations: Sungai Buloh, Shah Alam, Glenmarie, Hicom

Highway system
- Highways in Malaysia; Expressways; Federal; State

Federal Route 3214 is a former industrial federal road in the Klang Valley region, Selangor, Malaysia.

The Kilometre Zero is located at USJ Interchange.

At most sections, the Federal Route 3214 was built under the JKR R5 road standard, with a speed limit of 90 km/h.

There is one overlap: Shah Alam–Bukit Jelutong (overlaps with E35 Guthrie Corridor Expressway).

The Federal Route 3214 has been split into Federal Route 286 (Shah Alam–Puchong) and 287 (Subang–Batu Tiga).

== Highways ==
- FT287 Malaysia Federal Route 287 (Subang–Batu Tiga)
- FT286 Malaysia Federal Route 286 (Shah Alam–Puchong)
