= Jalan Kebun =

Road in Malaysia

Federal Route 190
- Jalan Kebun
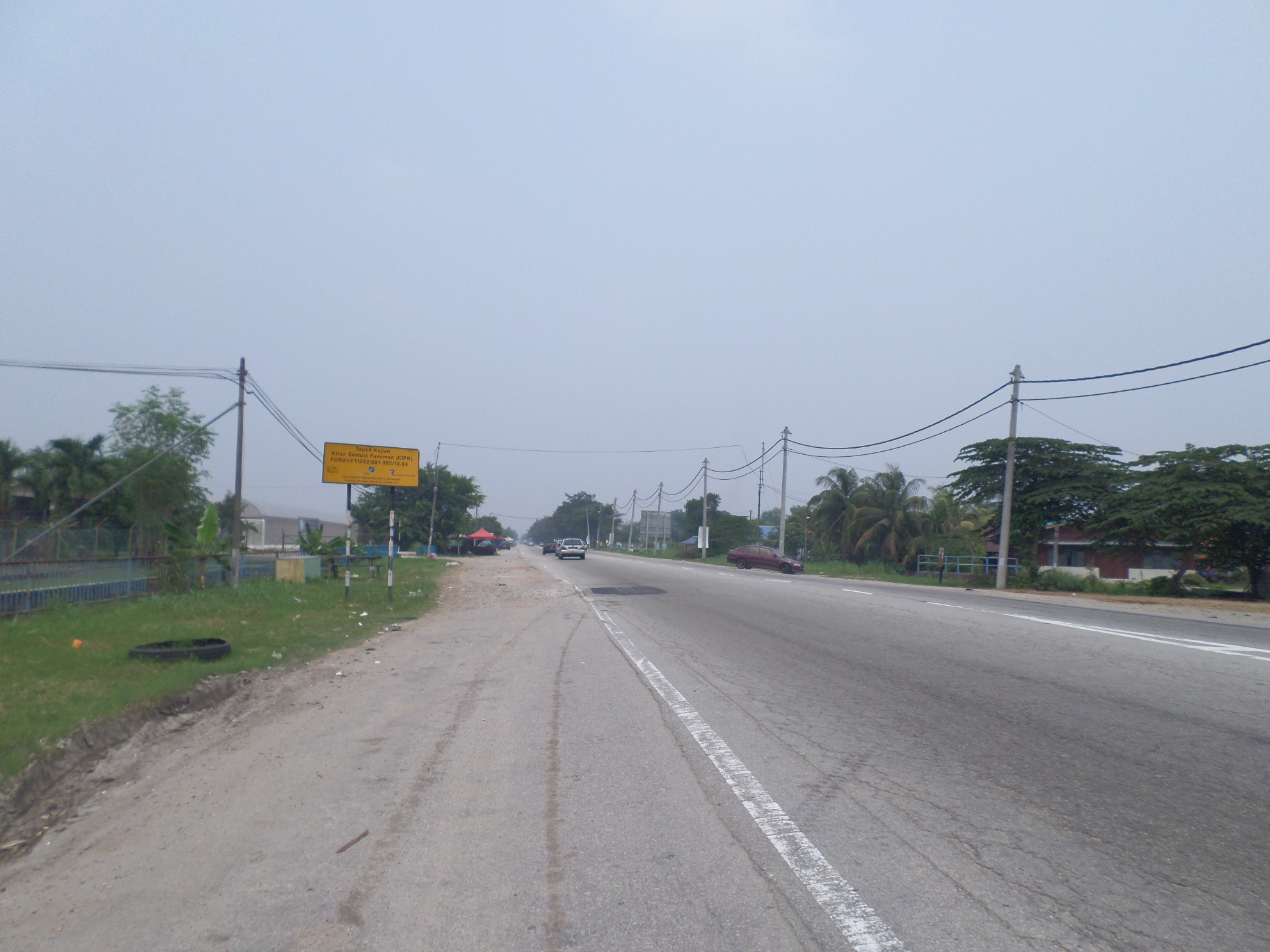

Route information
- Maintained by Malaysian Public Works Department

Major junctions
- North end: Bulatan Sungai Kandis
- FT 190 Federal Route 190; Shah Alam Expressway; B10 State Route B10; B129 State Route B129
- South end: Bukit Komandol

Location
- Country: Malaysia
- Primary destinations: Klang, Kota Kemuning, Bukit Rimau

Highway system
- Highways in Malaysia; Expressways; Federal; State

Jalan Kebun, Federal Route 190a (formerly Selangor State Route B6) is a federal road in Selangor, Malaysia.

== Junction list ==
The entire route is located in Selangor.

District	Location	km	mi	Name	Destinations	Notes
Klang	Sungai Kandis			Sungai Kandis Roundabout	Jalan Uganda (Jalan Sungai Jati) – Bandar Sentosa, Pandamaran, Taman Sri Andalas, Banting; FT 190 Malaysia Federal Route 190 – Klang city centre, Kampung Bukit Kemuning, Shah Alam, Hicom, Puchong; Jalan Kebun Nenas – Taman Sentosa	Roundabout
Klang	Kebun			Kebun-SAE	Shah Alam Expressway – Pulau Indah, West Port, Port Klang, North Port, Banting, Bukit Rimau, Kota Kemuning, Shah Alam, Subang Jaya, Petaling Jaya, Kuala Lumpur, Sri Petaling, KL Sports City, Kuala Lumpur International Airport (KLIA), Johor Bahru	Diamond interchange
Klang	Bukit Rimau			Kampung Bukit Rimau	B10 Selangor State Route B10 – Pandamaran, Banting; Jalan Bukit Rimau – Kota Kemuning	
Klang	Bukit Rimau			Kampung Batu 7	Jalan Kampung Batu 7 – Kampung Batu 7, Kota Kemuing	
Kuala Langat	Sijangkang			Bukit Komandol	Jalan Kemandol Utama – Taman Sri Orked; Jalan Sijangkang Utama – Sijangkang, Teluk Panglima Garang, Banting	
Kuala Langat	Bandar Tropicana Awam			Bandar Tropicana Awam	B129 Jalan Masjid – Sijangkang, Teluk Panglima Garang, Banting; Persiaran Tropicana Aman Utama 1 – Bandar Tropicana Awam, Bandar Eco Santuari, Bandar Rimbayu	
1.000 mi = 1.609 km; 1.000 km = 0.621 mi
