= Persiaran Sultan, Shah Alam =

Road in Malaysia

Persiaran Sultan

Major junctions
- North end: Sultan Salahuddin Abdul Aziz Shah Building
- BSA- Persiaran Pegawai; BSA3 Persiaran Masjid; FT 2 Federal Highway; FT 3216 Persiaran Selangor; BSA- Persiaran Jubli Perak; Kemuning–Shah Alam Highway
- South end: Section 24

Location
- Country: Malaysia

Highway system
- Highways in Malaysia; Expressways; Federal; State

Persiaran Sultan BSA1 is the longest municipal driveway (highway) in Shah Alam, Selangor, Malaysia. The driveway connects the Sultan Salahuddin Abdul Aziz Shah Building at the north to Bulatan Jubli Perak at the south. This driveway is maintained by the Shah Alam City Council or Majlis Bandaraya Shah Alam (MBSA)

== Junction lists ==
The entire route is located in Petaling District, Selangor.

Legend:

- I/C - Interchange, I/S - Intersection, RSA - Rest and service area, OBR - Overhead bridge restaurant, R/R - Restaurant and rest plaza, L/B - Layby, V/P - Vista point, TN - tunnel, T/P - Toll plaza, BR - Bridge
- C - Cloverleaf, S - Stack, T-A - Trumpet-A, T-B - Trumpet-B, DT - Directional-T/Y, SDT - Semi-Directional-T/Y, P-Y - Partial-Y, D - Diamond, P-C - Partial cloverleaf, D-D - Diverging diamond, D-R - Direct ramp

Location	km	mi	Name	Destinations	Notes
Shah Alam			Sultan Salahuddin Abdul Aziz Shah Building; Section 5	Sultan Salahuddin Abdul Aziz Shah Building (State Administrative Centre), Selangor State Monument	
Shah Alam			Shah Alam; Setia Jasa Roundabout	BSA- Persiaran Pegawai – Section 4, 6, 7 and 8, Sultan Salahuddin Abdul Aziz Shah Court Complex; BSA3 Persiaran Masjid – Section 2, 3 and 7, Universiti Teknologi MARA (UiTM), Sultan Salahuddin Abdul Aziz Mosque, Section 9 until 13	Roundabout interchange
Shah Alam			Shah Alam; Dataran Shah Alam	Plaza Perangsang and Quality Hotel Shah Alam, Shah Alam Walk, Shah Alam City Hall	City square
Shah Alam			Shah Alam; Persiaran Perbandaran	Persiaran Perbandaran – SACC Mall, Kompleks PKNS	Ramp from/to south
Shah Alam			SACC Mall ramp off	SACC Mall	Ramp off
Shah Alam			Shah Alam City Arch		
Shah Alam			Shah Alam; Jalan --	SACC Mall, Shah Alam city bus stations	Ramp from/to south
Shah Alam			Darul Ehsan Roundabout I/C–Jubli Perak Roundabout I/C see also Kemuning–Shah Alam Highway		
Shah Alam			Section 24		
1.000 mi = 1.609 km; 1.000 km = 0.621 mi: Concurrency terminus; Incomplete access
