= Bandar Gamuda Cove =

Township in Selangor, Malaysia

- Township
- Gamuda Cove
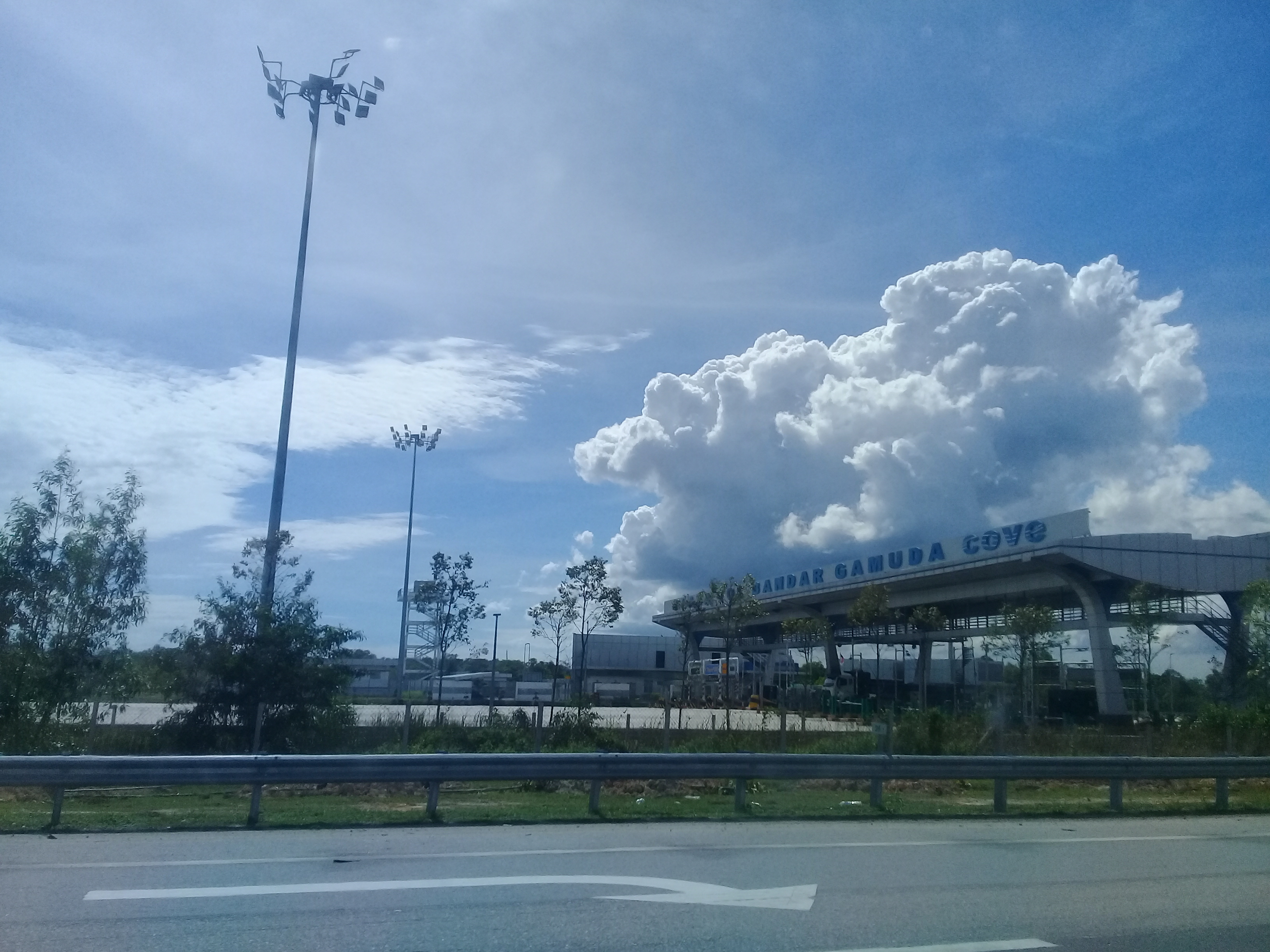
- Gamuda Cove Toll Plaza

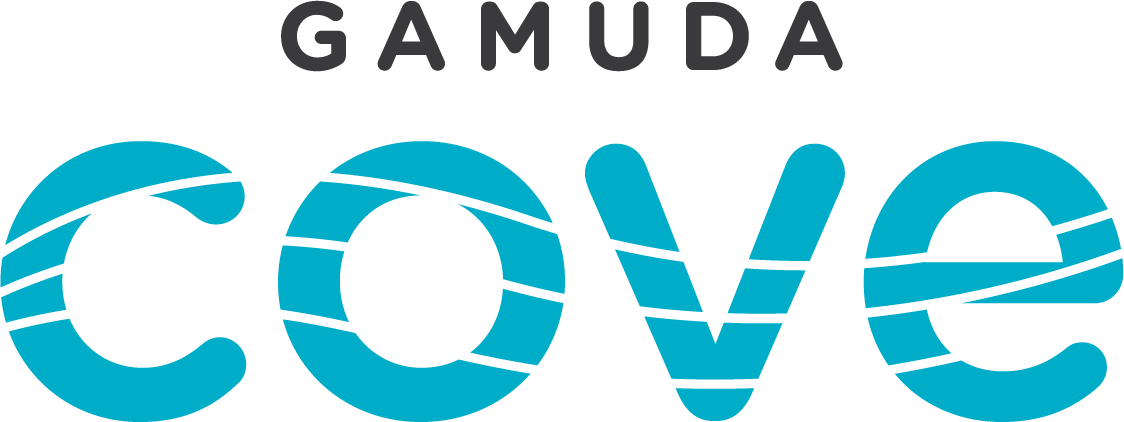
- Logo

- Location within Selangor Location within Peninsular Malaysia Location within Malaysia
- Coordinates: 2.8853385°N 101.6153145°E
- Country: Malaysia
- State: Selangor
- District: Kuala Langat
- Established: September 2018
- Founder: Gamuda Land

Area
  - Total: 6.1 km^{2} (2.4 sq mi)
- Time zone: UTC+8 (MYT)
- Postal code: 42700

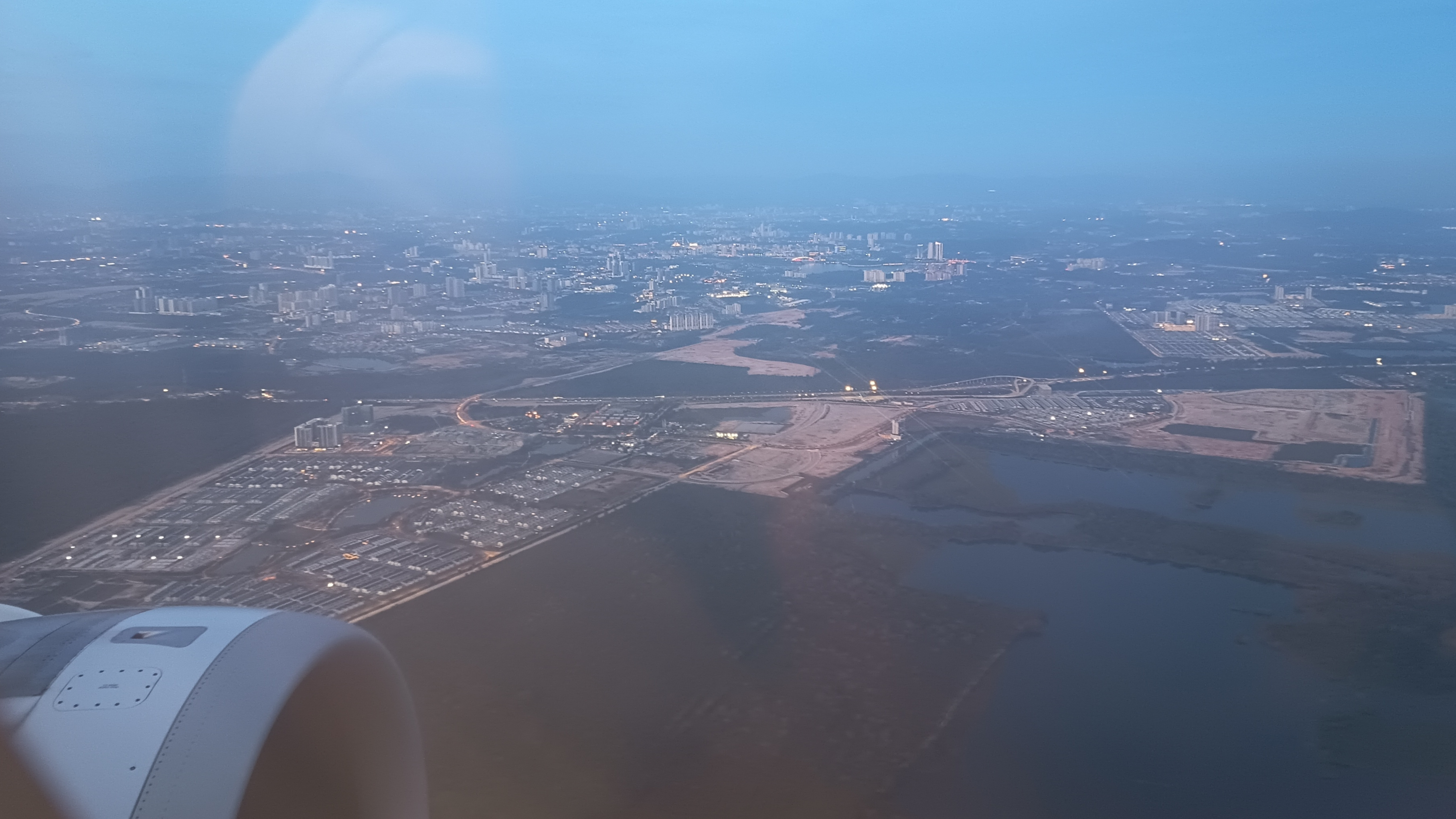
An aerial view of Bandar Gamuda Cove

Bandar Gamuda Cove is a township in Selangor, Malaysia, located next to Paya Indah Wetlands and Kuala Langat North Forest Reserve. Spanning over 1,530 acres (620 ha), it was launched in 2018 with the Discovery Park. It was projected that the population of Mori Pines and Palma Sands was going to reach 7,600 people by the end of 2024.

== Place of interest ==
- SplashMania Waterpark
- Townsquare
- Discovery Park
- Paya Indah Wetlands

== Transport ==
=== Car ===
It can be accessed by North–South Expressway Central Link and a direct link to Cyberjaya.

=== Public transport ===
It currently has no bus service but it has a tram service that will go around the loop.

== Climate ==
Bandar Gamuda Cove has a climate of Humid subtropical climate as usual with 25 °C (77 °F) and 31 °C (88 °F).
