= Kemuning–Shah Alam Highway =

Shortest expressway in Malaysia

Expressway 13
- Kemuning–Shah Alam Highway

Route information
- Maintained by Prolintas with its subsidiary Projek Lintasan Shah Alam Sdn Bhd (LKSA)
- Length: 7.3 km (4.5 mi)
- Existed: 2007–present
- History: Completed in 2010

Major junctions
- North end: Shah Alam, Federal Highway Route 2 Interchange
- BSA1 Persiaran Sultan; FT 2 Federal Highway; FT 3216 Persiaran Selangor; BSA-- Persiaran Jubli Perak; Persiaran Tun Teja; FT 190 Jalan Bukit Kemuning; Shah Alam Expressway; Persiaran Kota Kemuning
- South end: Kemuning Interchange; Shah Alam Expressway

Location
- Country: Malaysia
- Primary destinations: Shah Alam, Alam Impian, Kota Kemuning, Bukit Rimau, Klang, Pelabuhan Klang

Highway system
- Highways in Malaysia; Expressways; Federal; State

The E13 Kemuning–Shah Alam Highway (Malay: Lebuhraya Kemuning–Shah Alam), (LKSA), is an expressway in Klang Valley, Selangor, Malaysia. The 7.3 km (4.5 mi) expressway connects Kemuning Interchange of the Shah Alam Expressway E5 near Kota Kemuning until Federal Highway Route 2 Interchange (also known as Bulatan Darul Ehsan Interchange) of the Federal Highway Route 2 near Klang. It was originally given route code E4, but was later changed to E13 and E4 was used by South Kedah Expressway.

== Route background ==
The expressway starts at Kemuning Interchange and its interchange with the Persiaran Kota Kemuning and Shah Alam Expressway E5. After that, it passes the Jalan Bukit Kemuning Interchange, a toll plaza near Taman Sri Muda and Alam Impian Interchange. The expressway crosses the Klang River bridge to Section 24. The expressway overlaps with the Persiaran Sultan from Bulatan Jubli Perak Interchange towards Bulatan Selangor Interchange, Federal Highway Route 2 Interchange of the Federal Highway Route 2 and finally towards the Shah Alam city centre.

== History ==
Construction of the expressway began in 2007. The expressway used to be known as Persiaran Sultan, and covers areas from Shah Alam city to Section 24. It was built at the Majlis Bandaraya Shah Alam (MBSA) (Shah Alam City Council) area and took 24 months to construct. It was completed during 2010. The expressway was opened to traffic on 18 May 2010.

== Features ==
- Linking Kota Kemuning to Shah Alam to Klang.
- Straight and long expressway between Shah Alam city centre and Section 24.
- An access route to Alam Impian, including a layby opened in January 2023.
- A main route to the Shah Alam Expressway from Shah Alam and to the Federal Highway from Kota Kemuning.
- Federal Highway Route 2 Interchange, the largest cloverleaf interchange in Malaysia
- The Touch 'n Go Drive-Through Purchase and Refill (POS) lane is provided here at all toll plazas along the highway.

== Tolls ==
The Kemuning–Shah Alam Highway uses opened toll systems where all toll transactions at both toll plazas on the Kemuning–Shah Alam Highway are conducted electronically via Touch 'n Go cards or SmartTAGs starting 13 January 2016. Cash payments are no longer available. In October 2022, it was one of the four expressways maintained by PROLINTAS to have its toll rates deducted between 8% and 15%.

=== Toll rates ===
(Since 20 October 2022)

Class	Types of vehicles	Rate (in Malaysian Ringgit (RM))	
Class	Types of vehicles	Seri Muda	Alam Impian
0	Motorcycles (Vehicles with two axles and two wheels)	Free	
1	Private Cars (Vehicles with two axles and three or four wheels (excluding taxis and buses))	1.56	0.83
2	Vans and other small goods vehicles (Vehicles with two axles and five or six wheels (excluding buses))	3.40	1.80
3	Large Trucks (Vehicles with three or more axles (excluding buses))	5.10	2.70
4	Taxis	0.83	
5	Buses	1.10	0.55

== Interchange lists ==
The entire route is located in Selangor.

Legend:

- I/C - Interchange, I/S - Intersection, RSA - Rest and service area, OBR - Overhead bridge restaurant, R/R - Restaurant and rest plaza, L/B - Layby, V/P - Vista point, TN - tunnel, T/P - Toll plaza, BR - Bridge
- C - Cloverleaf, S - Stack, T-A - Trumpet-A, T-B - Trumpet-B, DT - Directional-T/Y, SDT - Semi-Directional-T/Y, P-Y - Partial-Y, D - Diamond, P-C - Partial cloverleaf, D-D - Diverging diamond, D-R - Direct ramp

District	Km	Exit	Flyover	Name	Destinations	Notes
Through to BSA1 Persiaran Sultan
Petaling	7.0	1306A 1306B	Ground	Federal Highway Route 2 I/C	Slip Roads – Shah Alam City Centre, Universiti Teknologi MARA (UiTM); Cloverleaf Interchange; FT 2 Federal Highway – Klang (Royal Town), I-City, Kuala Lumpur, Subang, Subang Jaya, Petaling Jaya	Cloverleaf interchange with separated slip roads
Petaling	6.6	1305	Ground	Bulatan Selangor I/C	FT 3216 Persiaran Selangor – Padang Jawa, Other factories, Section 15 and 16	Roundabout interchange
Petaling			Ground	Shah Alam Fire Station		Shah Alam bound
Petaling			Ground	Section 15 Police Station		Shah Alam bound
Petaling			Ground	Jalan Utas 15/1	Jalan UTAS 15/1 – Yeo Hiap Seng factory, Selangor State Veterinary Services Department, Slaughterhouse (Abattoir) Centre, UMW Toyota asslembly plant, N-IOI, Other factories	LILO exit
Petaling		BR	Ground	Railway crossing bridge		
Petaling			Ground	Section 18-Section 19	Jalan Kelapa 18/42 – Section 18; Jalan Petani 19/1 – Section 19, Centre for Instructor & Advanced Skill Training (CIAST); P&R Shah Alam Komuter station	LILO exit
Petaling		1304	Ground	Jubli Perak I/C	BSA- Persiaran Jubli Perak – Section 16 until 18, Section 19 until 35, Batu Tiga, Subang, Hicom, Puchong	Roundabout interchange
Petaling			Ground	Section 24	Jalan Rebung 24/13 – Section 24	Shah Alam bound
Petaling		BR	LKSA; Bridge	LKSA Bridge	U-Turn – Section 24, Shah Alam, Uptown Shah Alam	
Petaling–Klang district border		BR	LKSA; Bridge	Sungai Klang bridge		
Klang	3.1	BR	LKSA; Bridge	LKSA Arch		
Klang	2.5	BR	LKSA; Bridge	Sungai Rasau Bridge		
Klang	2.2	1303	Ground	Alam Impian I/C	T Alam Impian T/P; Alam Impian L/B (eastbound only); Persiaran Tun Teja – Alam Impian (Section 35)	Trumpet interchange
Klang	2.0	T/P	Ground	Seri Muda Toll Plaza	Touch 'n Go SmartTAG MyRFiD MyRFiD SmartTAG Touch 'n Go	
Klang	1.8	L/B	Ground	Seri Muda L/B	Seri Muda L/B – Sri Muda toll plaza, LKSA operation office TnG TAG; Customer Service Centre	Shah Alam bound
Klang	1.1	1302	Kemuning	Jalan Bukit Kemuning I/C	FT 190 Malaysia Federal Route 190 – Taman Sri Muda (Section 25), Section 25 until 31, Hicom, Puchong	From/to Shah Alam only
Klang		1301A 1301B	Kemuning	Kemuning I/C	Shah Alam Expressway – Klang, Pulau Indah, West Port, South Port, North Port, Kuala Lumpur International Airport (KLIA), Johor Bahru, Subang Jaya, Petaling Jaya, Sri Petaling, Kuala Lumpur, Cheras, Ampang, Kuantan	Cloverleaf interchange
Through to Persiaran Anggerik Mokara
