= Malaysia Federal Route 3213 =

Road in Malaysia

Federal Route 3213
- Persiaran Kerjaya

Route information
- Maintained by Malaysian Public Works Department
- Length: 5.6 km (3.5 mi)

Major junctions
- West end: FT 286 Jalan Subang-Batu Tiga
- FT 286 Federal Route 286; FT 15 Sultan Abdul Aziz Shah Airport Highway
- East end: FT 15 Sultan Abdul Aziz Shah Airport Highway

Location
- Country: Malaysia
- Primary destinations: Subang, Glenmarie, Subang Jaya, Subang Airport

Highway system
- Highways in Malaysia; Expressways; Federal; State

Persiaran Kerjaya, or Jalan Glemarie, Federal Route 3213, is a major highway in Klang Valley, Selangor, Malaysia. It is a toll-free highway and act as alternative route to Federal Highway.

The Kilometre Zero is located at Jalan Subang-Batu Tiga junction near Shah Alam.

== Features ==
At most sections, the Federal Route 3213 was built under the JKR R5 road standard, allowing maximum speed limit of up to 90 km/h (56 mph).

A portion of the elevated rapid transit line, the LRT Shah Alam Line, runs along the entire road road. Two stations on the Shah Alam Line are located on this road: Glenmarie 2 and Kerjaya.

== Junction lists ==
The entire route is located in Petaling District, Selangor.

Legend:

- I/C - Interchange, I/S - Intersection, RSA - Rest and service area, OBR - Overhead bridge restaurant, R/R - Restaurant and rest plaza, L/B - Layby, V/P - Vista point, TN - tunnel, T/P - Toll plaza, BR - Bridge
- C - Cloverleaf, S - Stack, T-A - Trumpet-A, T-B - Trumpet-B, DT - Directional-T/Y, SDT - Semi-Directional-T/Y, P-Y - Partial-Y, D - Diamond, P-C - Partial cloverleaf, D-D - Diverging diamond, D-R - Direct ramp

Location	km	mi	Exit	Name	Destinations	Notes
Shah Alam	0.0	0.0	321301	Jalan Subang-Batu Tiga I/S	FT 286 Malaysia Federal Route 286 – Shah Alam, TTDI Jaya, Batu Tiga; Guthrie Corridor Expressway – Rawang, Ipoh; FT 2 Federal Highway – Kuala Lumpur, Klang	T-junctions
Shah Alam			321302	Jalan Pentadbir U1/30 I/S	Jalan Pentadbir U1/30	T-junctions
Shah Alam			321303	Jalan Pegawai U1/33 I/S	Jalan Pegawai U1/33	T-junctions
Shah Alam			321304	Jalan Kontraktor U1/11 I/S	Jalan—U1/-- – Ntv 7 TV stations, UOW Malaysia (KDU)	T-junctions
Shah Alam			Caltex and Shell Layby			
Shah Alam			321305	Jalan Hakim U1/24 I/S	Jalan Hakim U1/24 – Ntv 7 TV stations, Proton Parts Centre; FT 3213 Jalan Glenmarie Lama – Batu Tiga	Junctions
Shah Alam				BMW showroom	BMW showroom	
Shah Alam				DENSO	DENSO	
Shah Alam			Railway crossing bridge			
Shah Alam			321306	Jalan Glenmarie Lama I/S	FT 3213 Jalan Glenmarie Lama – Glenmarie Golf and Country Club	T-junctions
Shah Alam			321307	Jalan Pengaturcaraan U1/51 I/S	Jalan Pengaturcaraan U1/51 – Temasya Industrial Park, Subang Jaya	T-junctions
Shah Alam			321308	Jalan Glenmarie Lama Exit	FT 3213 Jalan Glenmarie Lama – Glenmarie Golf and Country Club	Subang Airport bound
Shah Alam			321309	DRB-HICOM I/S	Jalan Canselor U1/13 – DRB-HICOM headquarters, Holiday Inn Glenmarie Resort (formerly known as the Pan Pacific Glenmarie Resort)	T-junctions
Shah Alam			321310	Temasya I/S	Jalan U1/-- – Temasya Industrial Park	T-junctions
Shah Alam				EON Showroom	EON Showroom	
Shah Alam			321311	Jalan Presiden U1/1 I/S	Jalan Presiden U1/1 – Caltex petrol stations	Junctions
Shah Alam				TNB substations	TNB substations	
Shah Alam			321312	Sultan Abdul Aziz Shah Airport Highway Exit	FT 15 Sultan Abdul Aziz Shah Airport Highway – Subang Airport, Subang, Sungai Buloh North–South Expressway Northern Route / AH2 / AH141 – Ipoh, Damansara, Kuala Lumpur, Klang, Kuala Lumpur International Airport (KLIA), Johor Bahru	Subang Airport bound
1.000 mi = 1.609 km; 1.000 km = 0.621 mi: Incomplete access
