= Shah Alam Expressway =

Road in Malaysia

Expressway 5
- Shah Alam Expressway; Lebuhraya Shah Alam; Lebuhraya KESAS 莎阿南大道
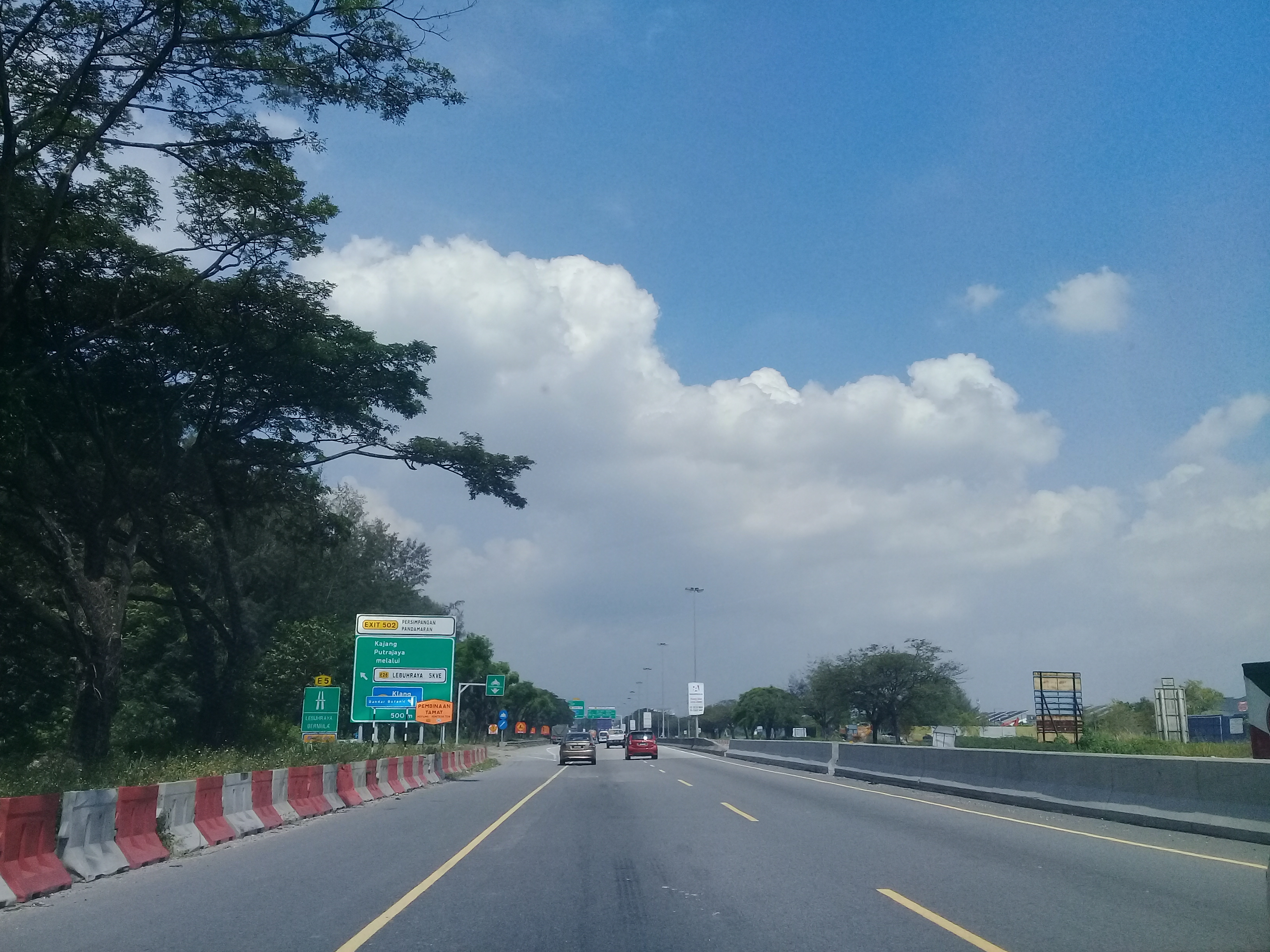

Route information
- Maintained by Konsortium Expressway Shah Alam Selangor Sdn. Bhd.
- Length: 57.5 km (35.7 mi)
- Existed: 1994–present
- History: Completed in November 1996; 29 years ago

Major junctions
- West end: FT 181 Pulau Indah Expressway at Pandamaran, Selangor
- FT 5 Klang–Banting Highway; West Coast Expressway; Kemuning–Shah Alam Highway; FT 3214 Shah Alam–Puchong Highway; North–South Expressway Central Link; Damansara–Puchong Expressway; Maju Expressway; Kuala Lumpur–Seremban Expressway; Sungai Besi–Ulu Klang Elevated Expressway
- East end: FT 28 Kuala Lumpur Middle Ring Road 2 at Sri Petaling, Kuala Lumpur

Location
- Country: Malaysia
- Primary destinations: Klang, Kota Kemuning, Shah Alam, Subang Jaya, USJ, Puchong, Bandar Kinrara, Awan Kecil, Awan Besar, Bukit Jalil, Kompleks Sukan Negara, Sri Petaling

Highway system
- Highways in Malaysia; Expressways; Federal; State

The E5 Shah Alam Expressway is a 57.5-kilometre (35.7-mile) controlled-access highway in Peninsular Malaysia running between Pandamaran in Klang, Selangor to Sri Petaling in Kuala Lumpur. Shah Alam Expressway is the third east–west-oriented expressway in the Klang Valley after the Federal Highway and New Klang Valley Expressway. This expressway is part of the Kuala Lumpur Middle Ring Road 2 Scheme (Sunway Interchange–Sri Petaling Interchange). Shah Alam Expressway does not pass through Shah Alam as its name suggests – consequently, motorists will need to travel another 7.3 km to Shah Alam via Kemuning–Shah Alam Highway.

== Overview ==
The Shah Alam Expressway is an alternative to the congested Federal Highway, and a motorist on the expressway can practically travel to any part of the Klang Valley as it connects to a wide range of highway networks such as the Damansara–Puchong Expressway, North–South Expressway Central Link, North–South Expressway, Maju Expressway, New Klang Valley Expressway, Kemuning–Shah Alam Highway and the Kuala Lumpur–Karak Expressway.

Given its high accessibility in connectivity, the Shah Alam Expressway is a popular travelling mode and over one million motorists ply the route on a daily basis, of which 66% are using the toll-free stretch.

The Shah Alam Expressway starts at kilometre 18 near Pandamaran Interchange in Klang, Selangor.

== History ==
=== Konsortium Expressway Shah Alam Selangor ===
The Konsortium Expressway Shah Alam Selangor Sdn Bhd (KESAS) is a join consortium between Selangor State Development Corporation (PKNS), Gamuda, Arab Malaysian Development Berhad (AMDB) and Permodalan Nasional Berhad (PNB). The company was formed on 3 September 1993 to finance, design, construct, operate, maintain and collect toll for the Shah Alam Expressway for 28 years and 9 months.

=== Construction ===
Construction of the expressway began on 1994. Phase 1 (Seafield–Sri Petaling) was completed in 1996 and Phase 2 (Seafield–Pandamaran) was completed in 1998. During the 1998 Commonwealth Games in Kuala Lumpur, the expressway became a gateway to National Sports Complex in Bukit Jalil.

The expressway formerly featured its own electronic toll collection system, known as the "Express TAG". From 1 July 2004, the Express TAG was replaced by the Touch 'n Go and SmartTAG systems.

== Tolls ==
The Shah Alam Expressway using opened toll systems.

=== Electronic Toll Collections (ETC) ===
As part of an initiative to facilitate faster transaction at the Kemuning, Sunway, Awan Besar and Awan Kecil Toll Plazas, all toll transactions at four toll plazas on the Shah Alam Expressway will be conducted electronically via Touch 'n Go cards or SmartTAGs starting 2 March 2016.

=== Toll rates ===
(Starting 15 January 2013)

Class	Type of vehicles	Rate (in Malaysian Ringgit (RM))
0	Motorcycles, bicycles or vehicles with 2 or less wheels	Free
1	Vehicles with 2 axles and 3 or 4 wheels excluding taxis	RM2.00
2	Vehicles with 2 axles and 5 or 6 wheels excluding buses	RM3.00
3	Vehicles with 3 or more axles	RM4.00
4	Taxis	RM1.00
5	Buses	RM1.50

=== Toll name ===
Abbreviation	Name
KMN	Kemuning
SUN	Sunway
AWB	Awan Besar (West)
AWK	Awan Besar (East)

== Interchange lists ==
Below is a list of interchanges (exits), laybys and rest and service areas along the Shah Alam Expressway. The exits are arranged in ascending numerical order from West to East.

Legend:

- I/C - Interchange, I/S - Intersection, RSA - Rest and service area, OBR - Overhead bridge restaurant, R/R - Restaurant and rest plaza, L/B - Layby, V/P - Vista point, TN - tunnel, T/P - Toll plaza, BR - Bridge
- C - Cloverleaf, S - Stack, T-A - Trumpet-A, T-B - Trumpet-B, DT - Directional-T/Y, SDT - Semi-Directional-T/Y, P-Y - Partial-Y, D - Diamond, P-C - Partial cloverleaf, D-D - Diverging diamond, D-R - Direct ramp

State/territory	District	Location	km	mi	Exit	Name	Destinations	Notes
Selangor	Klang	Pandamaran			Through to FT 181 Pulau Indah Expressway			
Selangor	Klang	Pandamaran	18.8	11.7	502	Pandamaran I/C	FT 5 Klang–Banting Highway – Klang (Royal Town), Bandar Bukit Tinggi, Bandar Botanic, Teluk Panglima Garang, Banting	Diamond interchange
Selangor	Klang	Pandamaran	19.1	11.9	502A	Bandar Botanic I/C	Persiaran Mahogani – Bandar Botanic, Bandar Bukit Tinggi	Ramp on/off interchange
Selangor	Klang	Pandamaran	19.4	12.1	503	Bandar Puteri I/C	Lebuh Pending Satu – Bandar Puteri	Diamond interchange
Selangor	Klang	Kebun	20.0	12.4	503A	Kebun West I/C	West Coast Expressway – Taiping, Teluk Intan, Kuala Selangor, Teluk Panglima Garang, Banting, Kuala Lumpur International Airport (KLIA)	Trumpet interchange
Selangor	Klang	Kebun	24.5	15.2	504	Kebun I/C	B14 Jalan Kebun– Klang (Royal Town), Jalan Bukit Kemuning, Kampung Bukit Rimau, Bukit Komandol	Diamond interchange
Selangor	Klang	Kemuning	27.0	16.8	Kemuning Toll Plaza			
Selangor	Klang	Kemuning	27.2	16.9	Kemuning Toll Plaza L/B			
Selangor	Klang	Kemuning			505	Bukit Rimau I/C	Persiaran Anggerik Eria – Bukit Rimau	Trumpet interchange
Selangor	Klang	Kemuning			506	Kota Kemuning I/C	Kemuning–Shah Alam Highway – Alam Impian, Shah Alam, Klang (Royal Town), Persiaran Kota Kemuning – Kota Kemuning, Kota Kemuning Golf & Country Club	Cloverleaf interchange
Selangor	Klang–Petaling District border				Sungai Klang bridge			
Selangor	Petaling	Hicom	33.0	20.5	507	Hicom I/C	FT 190 Jalan Bukit Kemuning – Kampung Bukit Kemuning, Taman Sri Muda (Seksyen 25); FT 3214 Shah Alam–Puchong Highway / BSA7 Persiaran Kuala Selangor – Shah Alam (Seksyen 1–21), Hicom Industrial Area (Seksyen 26–27); Damansara–Puchong Expressway – Puchong, Putrajaya, Cyberjaya	Diamond interchange
Selangor	Petaling	Hicom				Proton Centre of Excellence	Showroom (parking)	From Sri Petaling only
Selangor	Petaling	Hicom			Hicom L/B, Petronas, Petron, Shell (both directions; separated)			
Selangor	Petaling	Seafield	35.9	22.3	508	Seafield I/C	North–South Expressway Central Link / AH2 – Ipoh, Subang, Klang, Kuala Lumpur, KLIA, Johor Bahru	Trumpet interchange
Selangor	Petaling	Seafield				Elevated U-turn	Shah Alam Expressway – Sri Petaling, Kajang, Seremban, Cheras, Ampang, Kuantan	Elevated U-turn
Selangor	Petaling	Seafield			510	Kewajipan I/C	Persiaran Kewajipan – Subang, Sultan Abdul Aziz Shah Airport, Subang Jaya, USJ, Putra Heights	Diamond interchange
Selangor	Petaling	Seafield				Persiaran Subang Mewah Exit	Slip roads – Persiaran Subang Mewah (USJ 1)	From Sri Petaling only
Selangor	Petaling	Sunway			Sungai Penaga bridge			
Selangor	Petaling	Sunway				Sunway South Quay	Jalan Lagoon Selatan – Sunway South Quay, Bandar Sunway, Monash University (Malaysia)	Directional ramp interchange (to/from Sri Petaling only)
Selangor	Petaling	Sunway				USJ 1 Exit	Slip roads – Persiaran Subang Permai (USJ 1)	From Sri Petaling only
Selangor	Petaling	Sunway				U-turn	Shah Alam Expressway – USJ, Putra Heights, Shah Alam, Klang	U-turn
Selangor	Petaling	Sunway	40.5	25.2	Sunway Toll Plaza; Wisma KESAS / KESAS operations (adjacent)			
Selangor	Petaling	Sunway			Sunway Toll Plaza			
Selangor	Petaling	Sunway			Sungai Klang bridge			
Selangor	Petaling	Sunway			511	Sunway I/C	Damansara–Puchong Expressway – Kepong, Damansara, Petaling Jaya, Puchong, Putrajaya, Cyberjaya	Cloverleaf interchange with one flyover ramp
Selangor	Petaling	Sunway	44.9	27.9	512	Kinrara I/C	Jalan Taman Seri Sentosa – Jalan Klang Lama / Petaling Jaya, Puchong, Kinrara	Diamond interchange
Kuala Lumpur	Bandar Tun Razak	Awan Besar			Kinrara RSA (eastbound)			
Kuala Lumpur	Bandar Tun Razak	Awan Besar			Awan Besar RSA, Caltex, Shell; Sate Kajang Haji Samuri (westbound)			
Kuala Lumpur	Bandar Tun Razak	Awan Besar			Awan Besar (East) Toll Plaza (AUX, Eastbound)			
Kuala Lumpur	Bandar Tun Razak	Awan Besar	47.7	29.6	Awan Besar (East) Toll Plaza (AUX) L/B (eastbound)			
Kuala Lumpur	Bandar Tun Razak	Awan Besar	48.0	29.8	513	Awan Besar I/C	Jalan Awan Besar – Awan Besar, Taman OUG; Jalan 1/155B – Bukit Jalil	Diamond interchange
Kuala Lumpur	Bandar Tun Razak	Awan Besar	48.2	30.0	Awan Besar (West) Toll Plaza (AUX) L/B (westbound)			
Kuala Lumpur	Bandar Tun Razak	Awan Besar			Awan Besar (West) Toll Plaza (Westbound, AWK)			
Kuala Lumpur	Bandar Tun Razak	Awan Besar			514	Awan Kecil I/C	Diamond interchange legs Jalan 2/149 – Taman Seri Endah, Awan Kecil; Jalan Kompleks Sukan – Bukit Jalil, KL Sports City Stacked interchange Maju Expressway – Kuala Lumpur (Jalan Tun Razak), Kampung Pandan, Putrajaya, Cyberjaya, KLIA	Stacked interchange with diamond below
Kuala Lumpur	Bandar Tun Razak	Sri Petaling			515	Sukom I/C	Jalan Merah / direct access to SUKE; Sungai Besi–Ulu Klang Elevated Expressway – Taman Seri Endah, KL Sports City	Diamond interchange
Kuala Lumpur	Bandar Tun Razak	Sri Petaling			516	Sri Petaling I/C	Complex system (cloverleaf/stacked/trumpet) with flyover toward Salak Selatan/Bangsar/Kuala Lumpur; Links: Sungai Besi–Ulu Klang Elevated Expressway – Ampang, Cheras, Bukit Teratai, Alam Damai; Kuala Lumpur–Seremban Expressway – Kuala Lumpur, Petaling Jaya, Sungai Besi; North–South Expressway Southern Route – Kajang, KLIA, Seremban, Malacca, Johor Bahru	
Kuala Lumpur	Bandar Tun Razak	Sri Petaling			Through to FT 28 Kuala Lumpur Middle Ring Road 2			
1.000 mi = 1.609 km; 1.000 km = 0.621 mi: Electronic toll collection; Incomplete access; Route transition

== Gallery ==
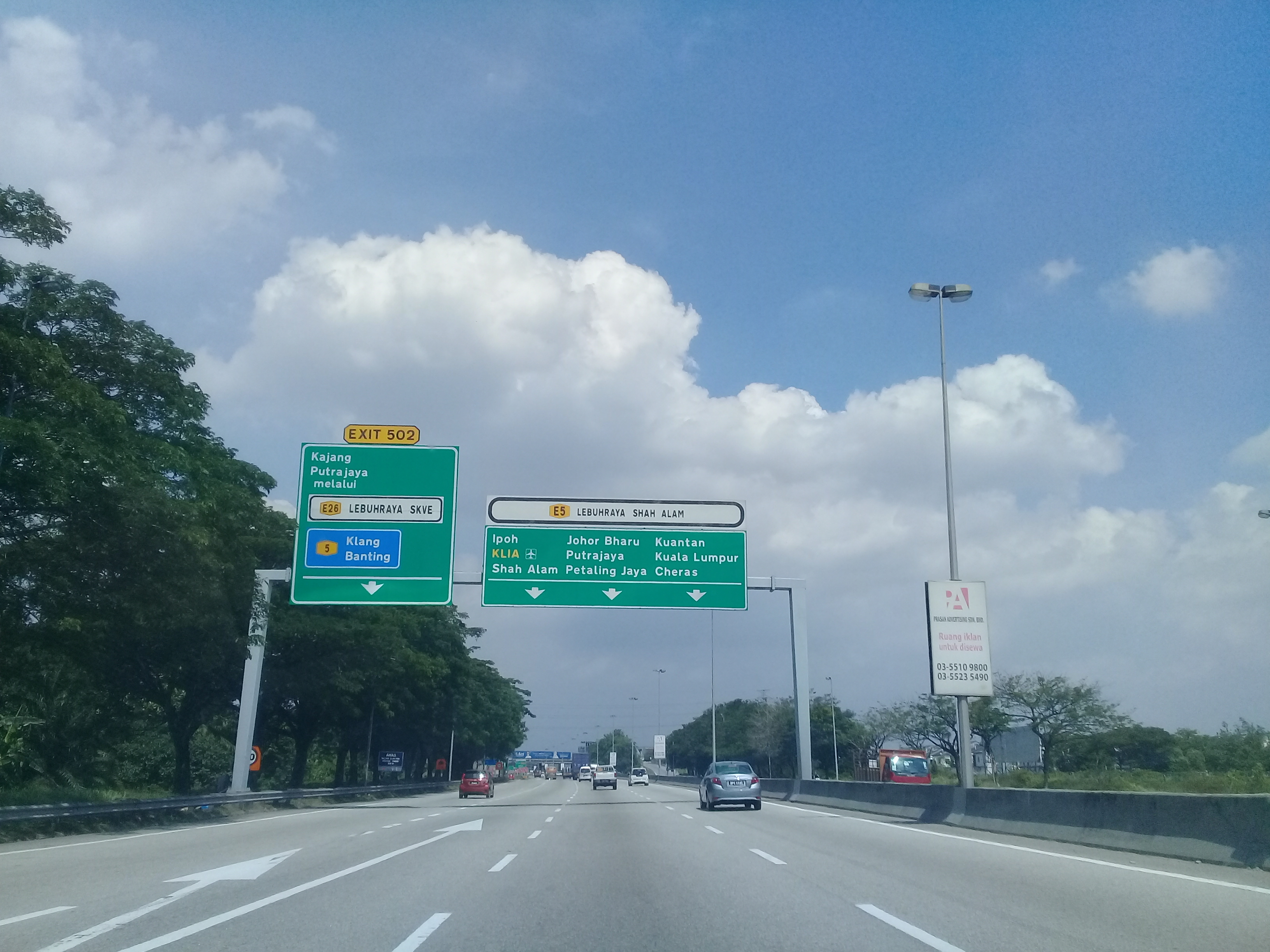
Pandamaran Interchange

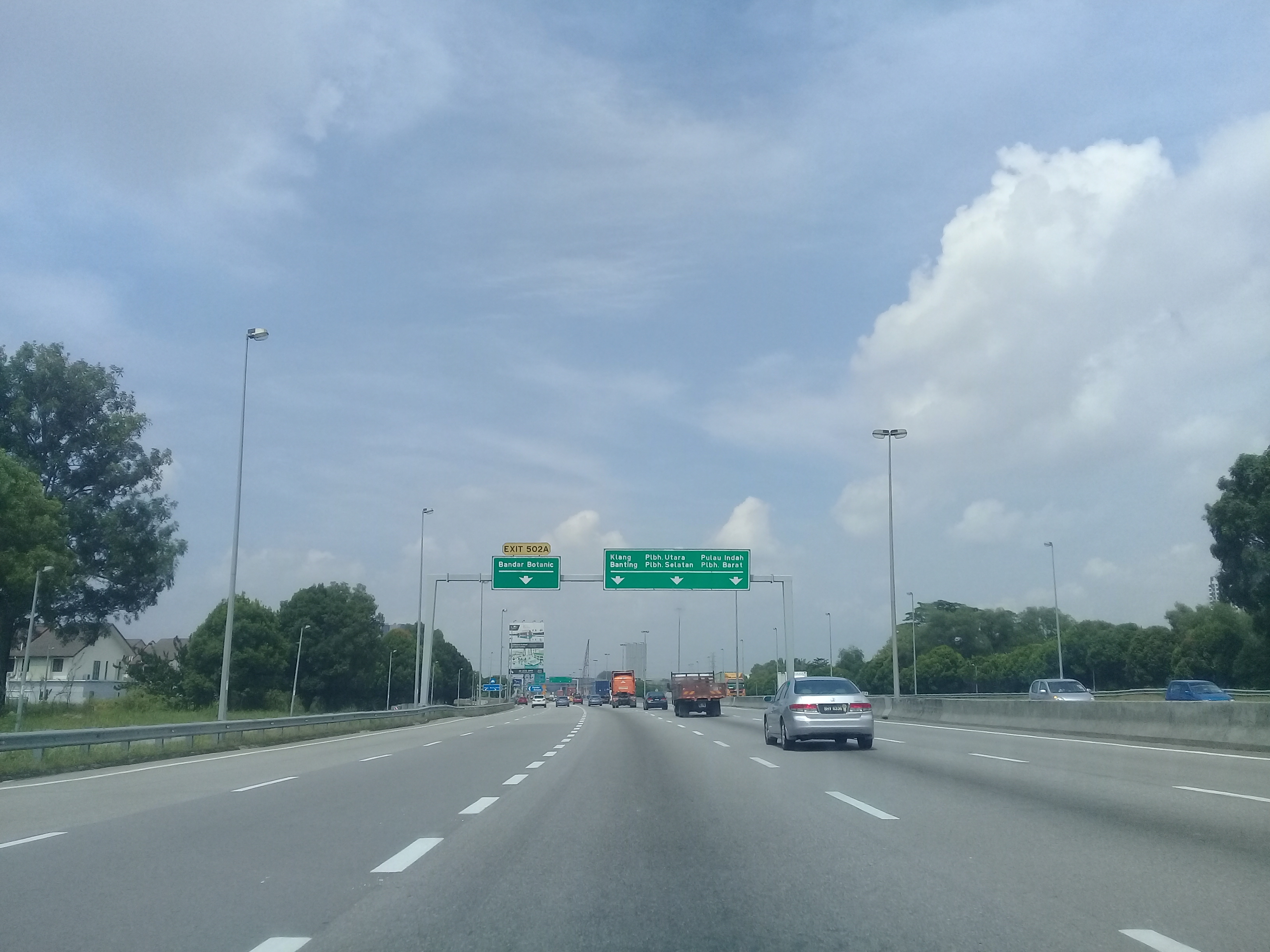
Bandar Botanic Interchange

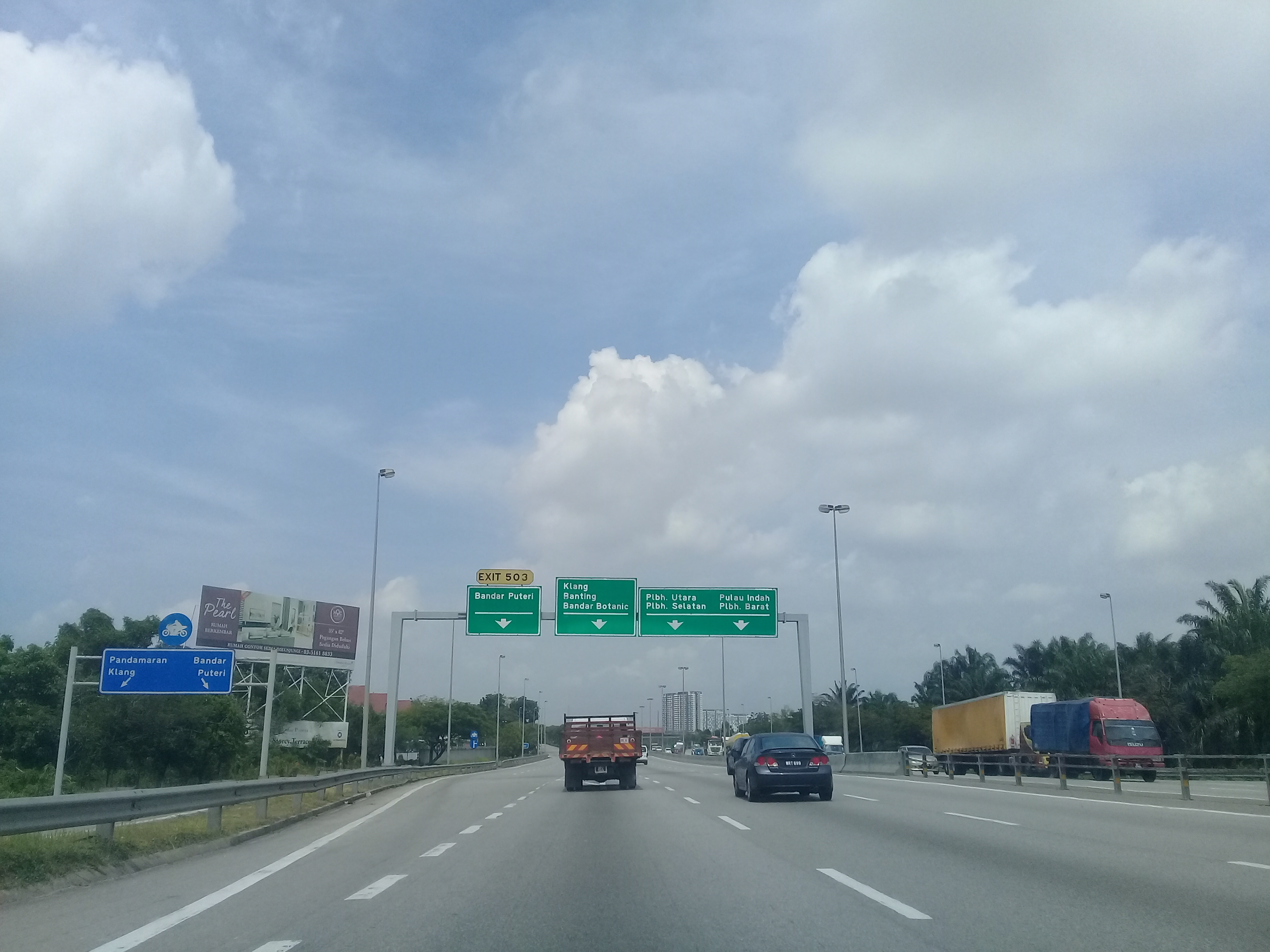
Bandar Puteri Interchange

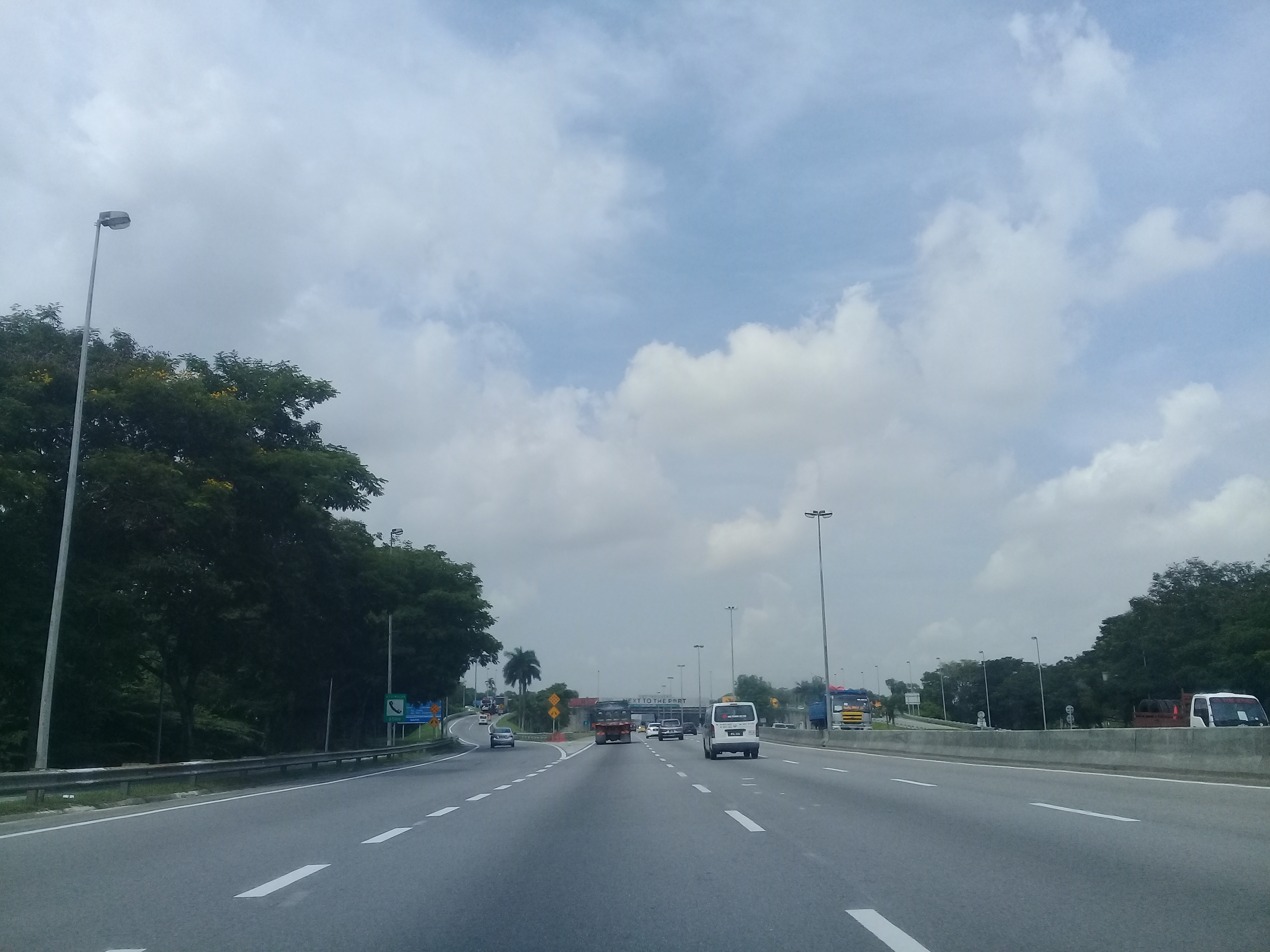
Kebun Interchange

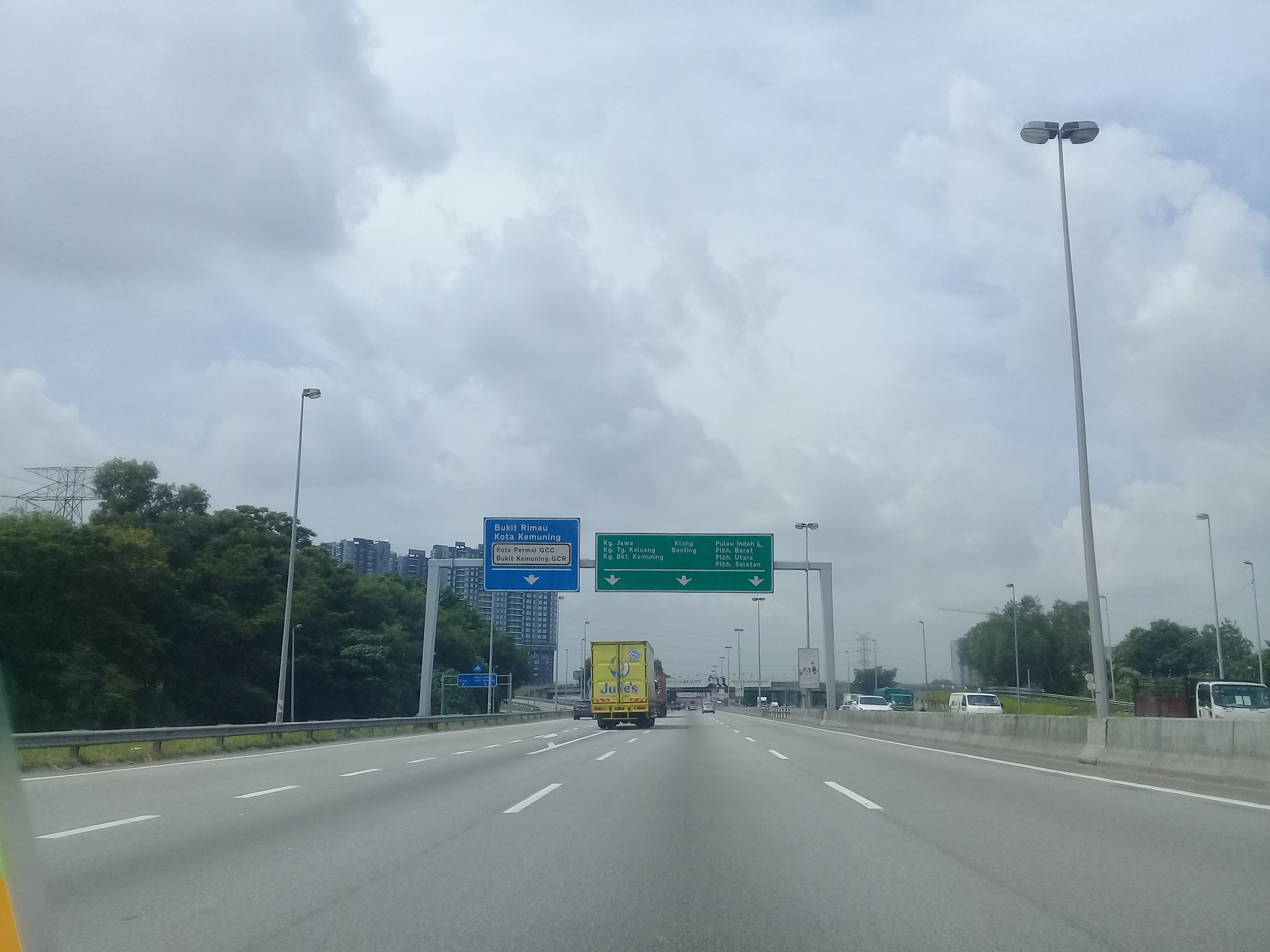
Bukit Rimau Interchange

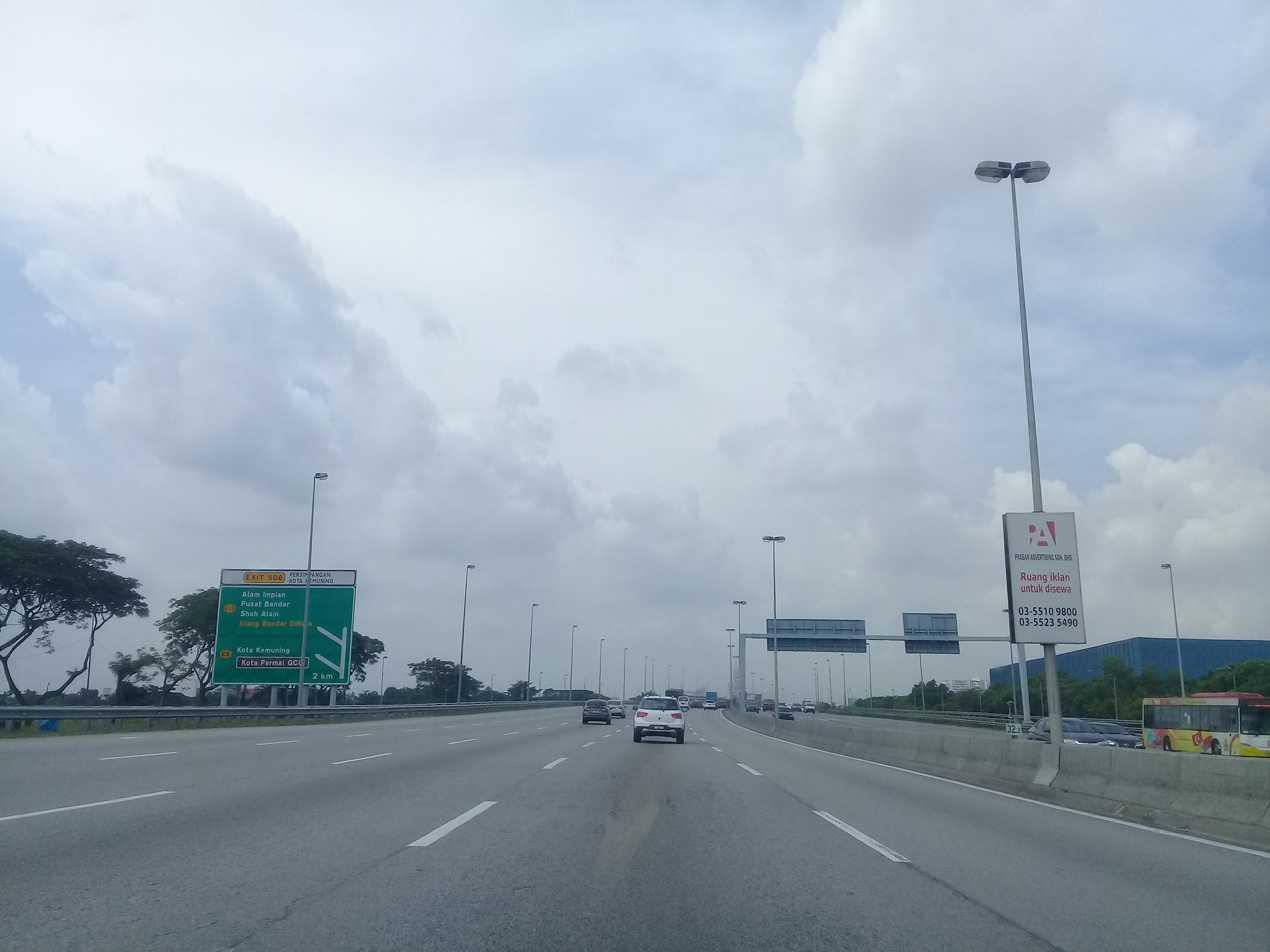
Kota Kemuning Interchange

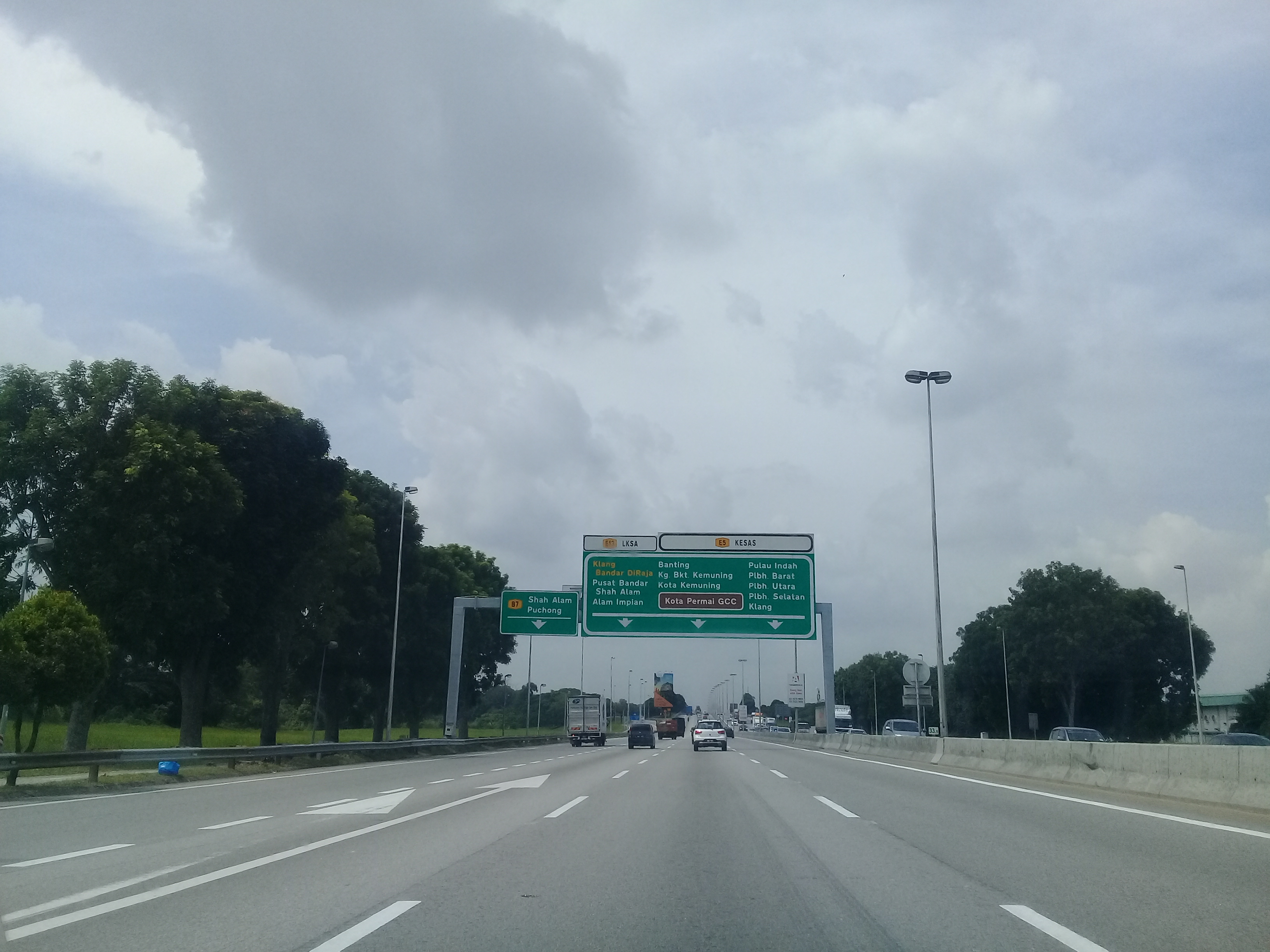
Hicom Interchange

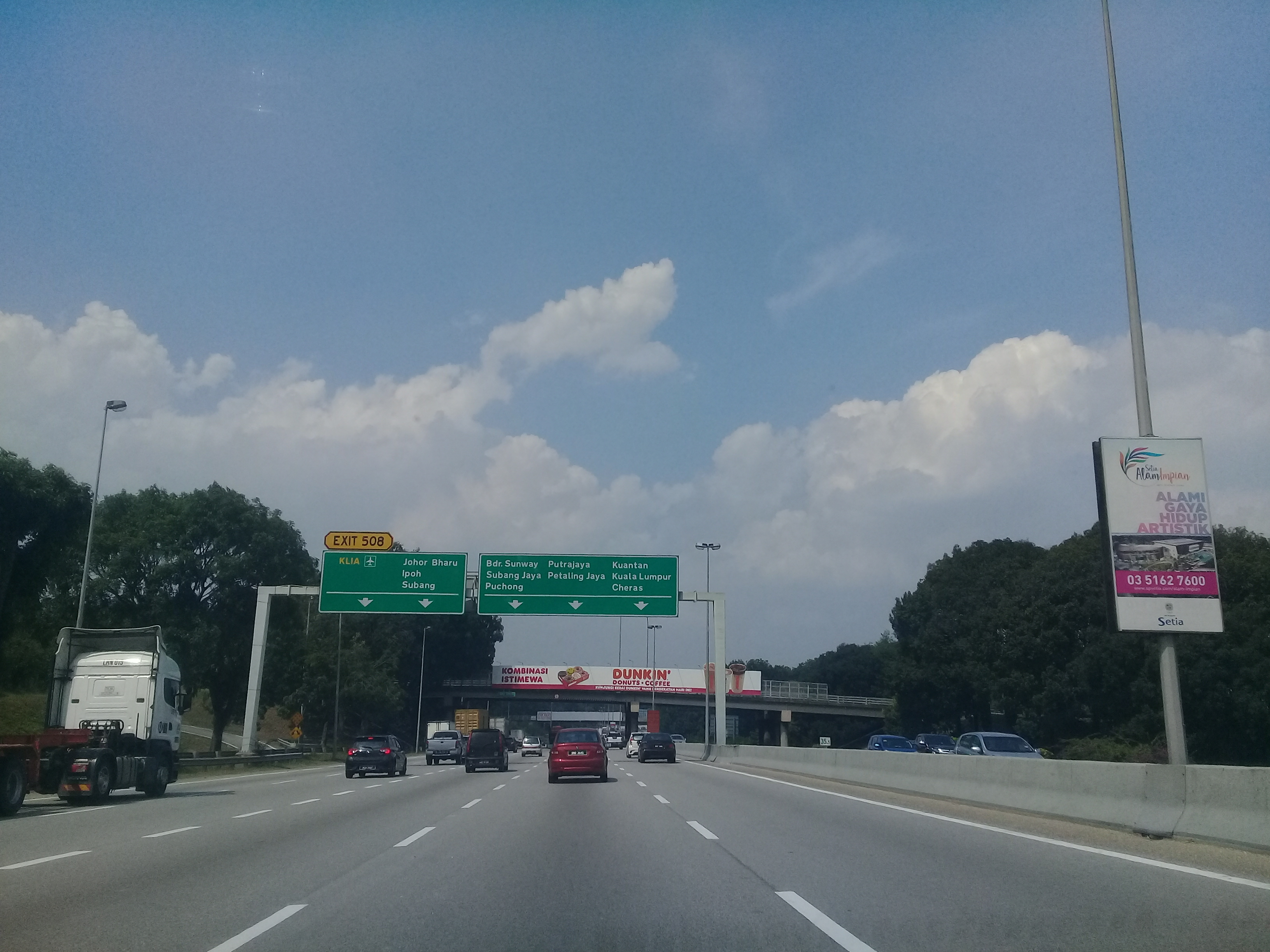
Seafield Interchange

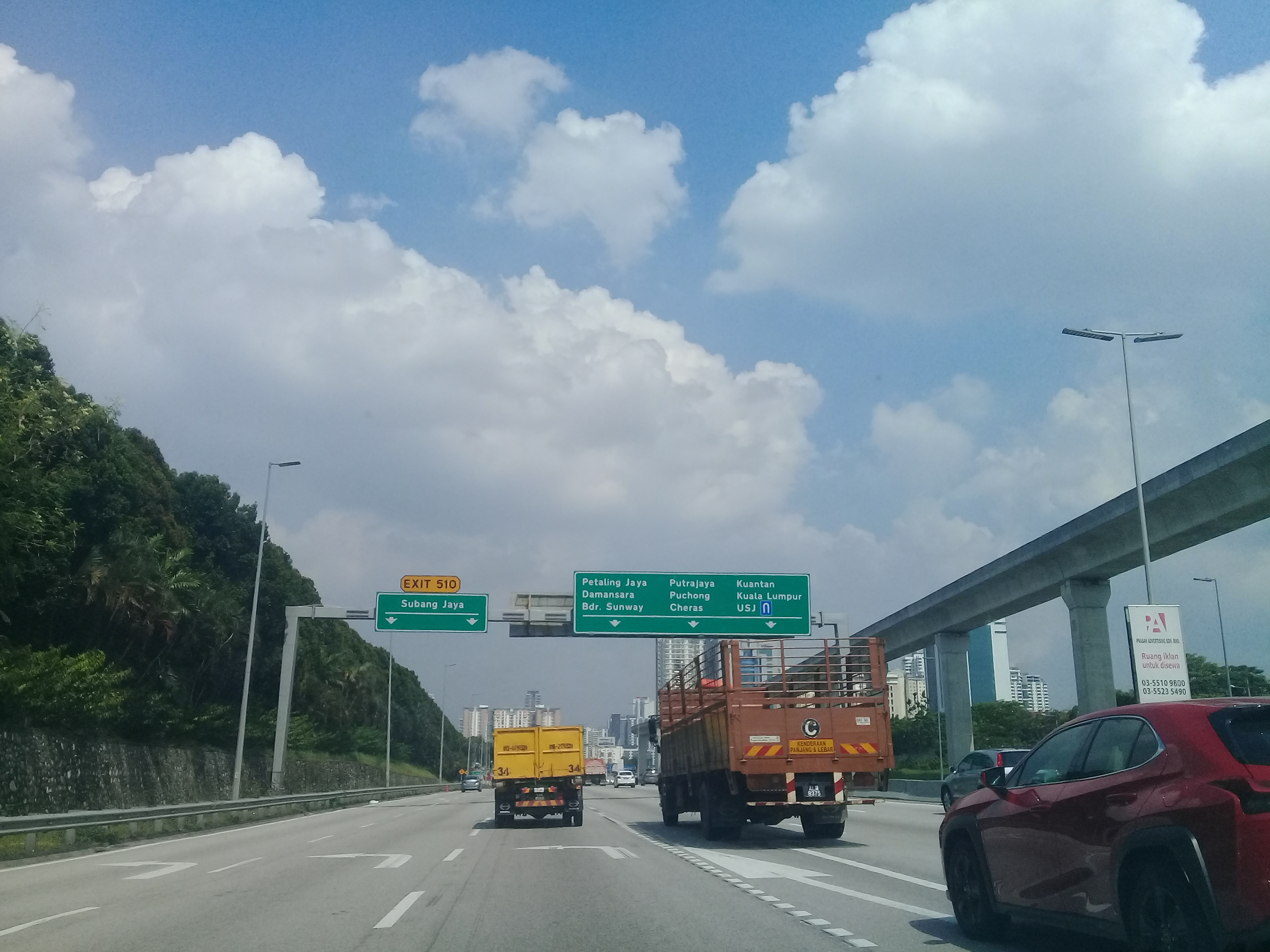
Kewajipan Interchange

== See also ==
- Malaysian expressway system
