= Gamuda =

Engineering, property and infrastructure company based in Malaysia

Gamuda Berhad
- Type: Public Limited Company
- Traded as: MYX: 5398
- ISIN: MYL5398OO002
- Industry: Engineering & Construction; Infrastructure & Concession; Property Development
- Founded: 6 October 1976
- Founders: Koon Yew Yin; Dato' Lin Yun Ling
- Headquarters: Menara Gamuda, D-16-01, Block D, PJ Trade Centre, No. 8, Jalan PJU 8/8A, Bandar Damansara Perdana, 47820 Petaling Jaya, Selangor, Malaysia
- Key people: Tan Sri Dato' Haji Ambrin Buang, Chairman; Dato' Lin Yun Ling, Group Managing Director & CEO
- Products: MRTs, railways, stormwater management and road tunnel, highways, expressways, bridges, dams, water treatment plant, airports and properties
- Revenue: ▲MYR13.35 Billion (2024)
- Net income: ▲MYR912.13 Million (2024)
- Total assets: ▲MYR13.3 Billion (2024)
- Total equity: ▲MYR5.2 Billion (2024)
- Number of employees: ≥ 6,053
- Subsidiaries: Gamuda Engineering Sdn Bhd; DT Infrastructure Pty Ltd; Gamuda (Australia) Pty. Ltd. Gamuda (Singapore) Pte Ltd. Gamuda Land Vietnam LLC; MMC Gamuda; Gamuda Saudi Arabia LLC; Gamuda Land Sdn Bhd; Gamuda Taiwan; Megah Management Services Sdn Bhd; Yayasan Gamuda; Gamuda Naim Engineering & Construction (GNEC) Sdn Bhd; Naim Gamuda (NAGA) JV Sdn Bhd
- Website: Gamuda Berhad

Gamuda Berhad (MYX: 5398) is a Malaysian company involved in engineering, infrastructure, and property development. The company is listed on the Main Market of Bursa Malaysia, Beyond Malaysia, Gamuda has operations in Australia, Taiwan, Vietnam, Singapore, India, and Qatar.

== Corporate background ==
The company was incorporated as a private limited company on 6 October 1976 in Ipoh, Perak and was listed on the main a board of Bursa Malaysia on 10 August 1992. It was founded by Koon Yew Yin and Lin Yun Ling.

One of its major projects was the Stormwater Management and Road Tunnel (SMART Tunnel) project – a 50:50 joint venture collaboration with MMC Corporation Berhad. Completed in year 2007, this 9.7 km SMART tunnel primary function is to divert excess floodwater from Sungai Klang and Sungai Ampang to be stored in the storage pond. This dual-purpose tunnel also serves as an alternative route for the motorist to travel to and from the city centre.

In 2008, MMC-Gamuda was awarded the RM12.485 billion worth of Electrified Double Track Project (EDTP) from Ipoh to Padang Besar. This 329 km Project involves the realignment and construction of the electrified double railways that span across four northern states of Perak, Penang, Kedah and Perlis in Peninsular Malaysia.

In January 2011, MMC-Gamuda received the letter of award that they were appointed as the Project Delivery Partner (PDP) for the KVMRT (Sungai Buloh – Kajang Line) (KVMRT, SBK Line). Being the PDP, MMC-Gamuda's role is to deliver the project within the target cost and completion dates, managing the elevated works package contractors, as well as dividing elevated works packages, evaluating tenders, recommending the best elevated works package contractors to MRT Corporation, the owner of the KVMRT project.

Besides, in March 2012, MMC Gamuda (T) Sdn Bhd was appointed as the turnkey contractor for the 9.5 km underground works for KVMRT, SBK Line worth RM8.28 billion. Seven underground stations will be constructed along the 9.5 km tunnel – KL Sentral, Pasar Seni, Merdeka, Bukit Bintang, Pasar Rakyat, Cochrane and Maluri. This underground works package inclusive of the design, construction and completion of tunnels, stations and associated structures between the Semantan Portal and Maluri Portal.

Besides the local projects they are developing, Gamuda has ventured internationally with various civil engineering construction, infrastructure and property development located in Taiwan, South East and Far East Asia, Indochina, Middle East, Australia, Singapore and Vietnam.

In Sarawak, on 28 July 2016, Gamuda announces that it had team up with Sarawak-based Naim Holdings Berhad via an associate company, Naim Gamuda (NAGA) JV Sdn Bhd. Their role is main contractor for Pantu Junction - Batang Skrang section in Sarawak in Pan Borneo Highway project in works package contract (WPC04 PJS). Its length is 89.43 km (55.57 mi).

On 1 July 2020 it was announced that Gamuda Bhd would be the project delivery partner (PDP) for the Penang Transport Master Plan (PTMP).

In June 2023, the Australian transport projects division of Downer Group was purchased and renamed DT Infrastructure.

In Sabah, the Ulu Padas Hydroelectric Project (UPHEP) is one of the most significant renewable energy initiatives, aimed at enhancing the state's energy security and sustainability. Gamuda Berhad, through its joint venture participation in UPP Holdings Sdn Bhd, is developing the UPHEP in the Tenom and Sipitang districts of Sabah. The project was formally approved by the Sabah State Government on 6 September 2024. The multibillion-ringgit project, with an estimated cost of RM4 billion, will have an installed capacity of 187.5 MW and is expected to generate about 1,052 GWh of renewable electricity annually. Scheduled for commercial operation by December 2030, UPHEP is designed to strengthen Sabah's electricity supply, adding around 15% to the state's dependable generation capacity. The project includes a 40-year power purchase agreement (PPA) between Gamuda's Upper Padas Power Sdn. Bhd. (UPPSB) and Sabah Electricity Sdn. Bhd. (SESB), ensuring stable revenue generation and long term maintenance support following its completion in 2030. Upon completion, UPHEP is expected to operate as a long-term source of renewable energy and revenue for Sabah. The project will enhance electricity stability, contribute to the state's renewable energy targets, and deliver consistent returns through its extended operational framework.

The hydroelectric facility is intended to provide a stable source of clean baseload power, reducing reliance on fossil fuel and enhancing energy security for both households and industries. The project aims to comply with the internationally recognised Hydropower Sustainability Standard (HSS) and includes the integration of floating solar technology on the reservoir, reinforcing its commitment to environmental sustainability. By supplying clean, renewable energy and supporting socio-economic growth, the UPHEP is positioned as a key driver of sustainable development for Sabah.

== Major shareholders ==
The substantial shareholders of Gamuda Berhad include several prominent Government-Linked Entities (GLEs) and institutional investors. These stakeholders play a significant role in the organization's governance and strategic direction.

- Employees Provident Fund (EPF): As the largest shareholder, EPF holds a substantial portion of Gamuda's shares, reflecting its significant investment in the company.
- Kumpulan Wang Persaraan (Diperbadankan) (KWAP): KWAP, the pension fund for public sector employees, is another key institutional investor in Gamuda.
- Permodalan Nasional Berhad (PNB): PNB, a prominent government-linked investment management company, holds a significant stake in Gamuda, aligning with its mandate to manage and grow the wealth of Bumiputera investors.
- Maybank Nominees (Tempatan) Sdn Bhd: This entity represents local institutional investors holding shares in Gamuda, often on behalf of unit trust funds and other investment vehicles.
- HSBC Nominees (Asing) Sdn Bhd: This nominee company holds shares on behalf of foreign institutional investors, indicating international interest in Gamuda's performance and prospects.
- Amanah Saham Nasional Berhad (ASNB): ASNB manages, a significant unit trust fund that invests in Gamuda, providing retail investors with exposure to the company's shares.

These major shareholders collectively contribute to Gamuda's strategic direction and corporate governance, reflecting the corporation's importance in Malaysia's infrastructure and property development sectors.

== Infrastructure projects ==
=== Airports ===
- New Doha International Airport (NDIA), Qatar

=== Bridge ===
- Sitra Causeway Bridges, Bahrain

=== Expressway Network ===
- Shah Alam Expressway Shah Alam Expressway
- Damansara–Puchong Expressway Damansara–Puchong Expressway
- Sprint Expressway Sprint Expressway
- SMART Tunnel Stormwater Management and Road Tunnel (SMART Tunnel), Malaysia
- Panagarh-Palsit and Durgapur Expressways, India
- Dukhan Highway, Qatar
- Pan-Borneo Highway

=== Mass Rapid Transit ===
- Klang Valley Mass Rapid Transit (KVMRT), Malaysia
  - Kajang Line (KG Line)
  - Putrajaya Line (PY Line)
- Kaohsiung Metropolitan Mass Rapid Transit (KMRT), Taiwan

=== Railway ===
- Electrified Double Track Project (EDTP)(Ipoh-Padang Besar), Malaysia

=== Township Development (Gamuda Land) ===
- Kota Kemuning, Shah Alam – A township
- Bandar Botanic, Klang
- Valencia, Sungai Buloh
- Horizon Hills, Johor – Located within the Iskandar Development Region
- Jade Hills, Kajang
- Gamuda Gardens, Rawang
- Gamuda Cove, Kuala Langat
- Gamuda Kemuning Twenty-five.7, Kuala Langat
- Madge Mansion, Kuala Lumpur
- The Robertson, Kuala Lumpur
- Kelana Jaya Development, Petaling Jaya
- Bukit Bantayan Residences, Inanam, Kota Kinabalu, Sabah
- 661 Chapel ST, Melbourne
- Gamuda City, Vietnam
- Celadon City, Vietnam

=== Water Treatment and Supply and Sewage Treatment ===
- Sungai Selangor Water Supply Scheme Phase 1 (SSP1), Malaysia
- Sungai Selangor Water Supply Scheme Phase 3 (SSP3), Malaysia
- Yen So Sewage Treatment Plant, Vietnam
- Ulu Padas Water Supply Scheme - a 6,000 MLD Treatment Plant in Beaufort, Sabah – part of the broader Ulu Padas hydropower & water infrastructure project

=== Hydroelectric Power ===
- Ulu Padas Hydroelectric Project (UPHEP), Tenom and Sipitang, Sabah – a massive 187.5 MW hydroelectric facility with Gamuda Berhad as the main turnkey developer
