= Alam Impian =

- Township

- Location in Peninsular Malaysia
- Coordinates: 3°1′22.32″N 101°30′38.34″E
- Country: Malaysia
- State: Selangor
- Establishment: 2006
- Time zone: UTC+8 (MST)
  - Summer (DST): Not observed
- Postal code: 40470
- Calling code: 03

Alam Impian is a township in Shah Alam. Developed by SP Setia, the township was launched in November 2006 under I&P Group Sdn Bhd. It has graffiti walls, an art gallery, linear parks, an amphitheatre, street art, a 31 acres (13 ha) central town park and a clubhouse.

== Access ==
Alam Impian is accessible via the Lebuhraya Kemuning–Shah Alam Highway (LKSA) Kemuning–Shah Alam Highway, the KESAS Shah Alam Expressway 506, the Federal Highway and the ELITE North–South Expressway Central Link.
