= Bukit Rimau =

- Township
- Nickname: Tiger Hill
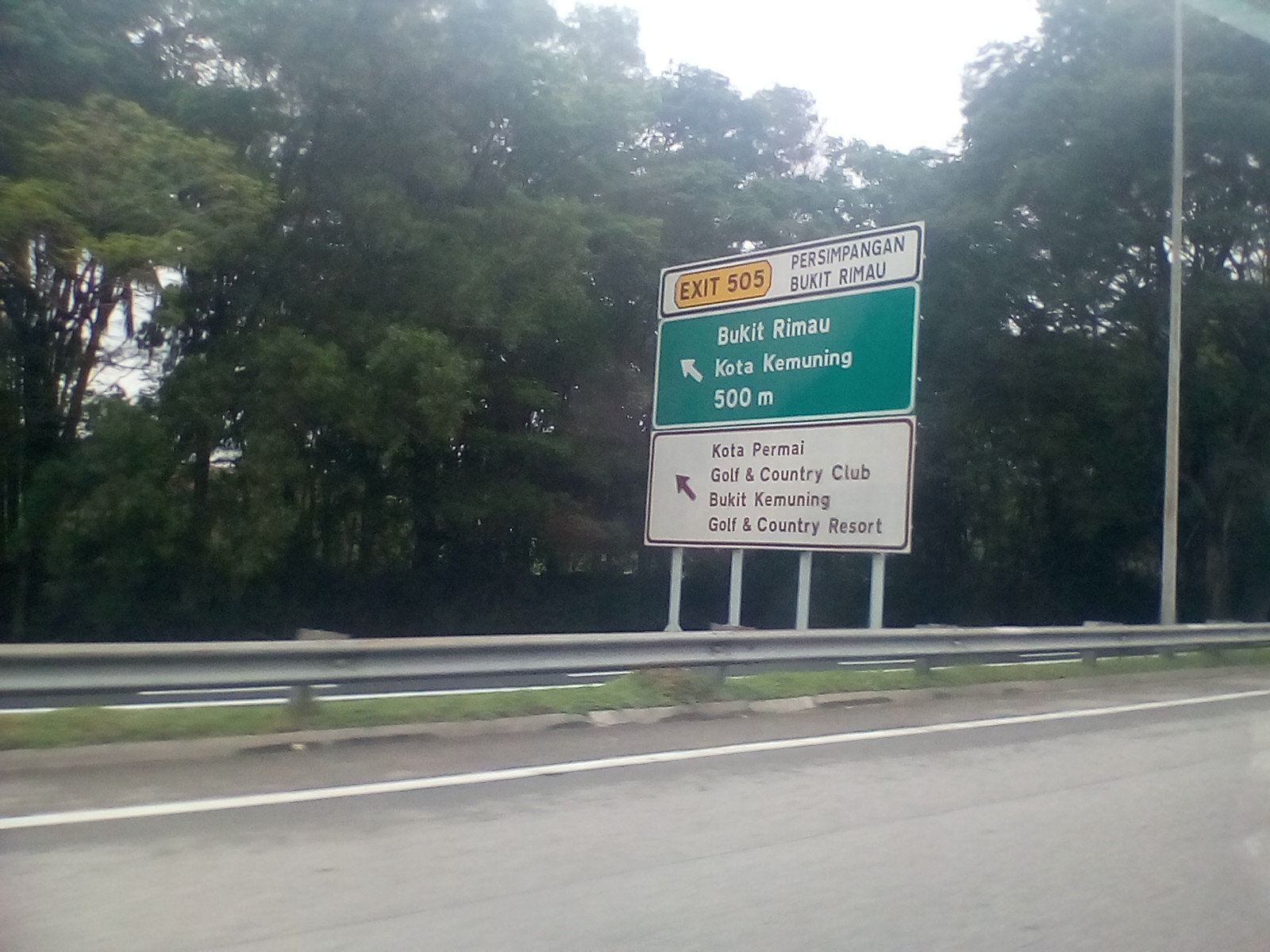
- Bukit Rimau Interchange

- Location in Peninsular Malaysia
- Coordinates: 2°59′52.88″N 101°31′44.63″E
- Country: Malaysia
- State: Selangor
- Establishment: 1996

Area
  - Total: 1.77 km^{2} (0.68 sq mi)
- Time zone: UTC+8 (MST)
  - Summer (DST): Not observed
- Postal code: 40460
- Calling code: 03

Bukit Rimau is a township in Shah Alam, Klang District, Selangor, Malaysia.

Together with the adjacent Kota Kemuning township, Bukit Rimau is known as one of the greenest suburbs in Selangor.

Occupying over 365 acres of land, part of Bukit Rimau is situated on a gentle, sloping hill. The area comprises a mixture of residential properties, commercial properties, offices, leisure and recreational facilities, educational and cultural facilities and industrial units.

== Background ==
Bukit Rimau was established around 1996. The name is derived from the Malay language words, Bukit Harimau, meaning Tiger Hill.

== Geography ==
Bukit Rimau is located in between 3 major cities, Subang Jaya, Shah Alam and Klang.

It is well connected to areas in the Klang Valley via a network of major highways including the Shah Alam Expressway (KESAS), Exit 505 - Bukit Rimau Interchange or Exit 506B - Kemuning Interchange and the Kemuning–Shah Alam Highway.

Bukit Rimau is also situated next to Kota Kemuning.

== Greenery ==
Bukit Rimau consists of at least 43 acres of parklands, pocket gardens, lush tropical vegetation and recreational facilities. The different precincts and parklands are interconnected by continuous pedestrian and cycle pathways.

The streetscape within the residential areas is spaciously laid out with roads that are 50 feet wide, allowing for generous green reserves on both sides.

Bukit Rimau and Kota Kemuning, where up to 45% of the area is covered in greenery, are known as two of the greenest residential areas in Selangor.

Bukit Rimau is also one of the first townships in Malaysia to place all utility services underground, offering neater and cleaner surroundings.

== Landmarks ==
- Chinese Taipei School - an international boarding school
- Columbia Asia Hospital - a regional hospital
- Nouvelle Industrial Park, Bukit Rimau
- Bukit Kemuning Golf & Country Resort - featuring an 18-hole golf course
- Matahari Clubhouse
- Shah Alam Buddhist Society - a major centre for Buddhism in the state and also a Wedding Registrar
- AEON Big Hypermarket
- Econsave Kota Kemuning - a hypermarket
- Sri Maha Mariamman Temple, Kota Kemuning - a Hindu temple
- Sekolah Kebangsaan Bukit Rimau (Bukit Rimau National School)

== Education ==
Primary and secondary
The Chinese Taipei School (CTS) is an international boarding school based in Bukit Rimau. The CTS follows Taiwan's educational schedule and uses Taiwanese teaching materials. Languages used for teaching include English, Mandarin Chinese and Malay language (Bahasa Melayu). The school complex consists of classrooms, an indoor stadium, library, a dormitory, laboratories, language labs, music rooms, cooking rooms, arts and crafts classrooms, dancing rooms and computer rooms. Although a majority of the school's students come from various foreign countries, applications from Malaysian students are accepted. SK Bukit Rimau is also a public primary school located in Bukit Rimau.

Tertiary
Nearby is the Malaysian Institute of Technology Academy (MIT Academy).

Training Centre
The Enviro Academy is a certified training provider sanctioned by Malaysia's Department of Environment and offers postgraduate courses.

== Healthcare ==
Healthcare in Bukit Rimau is provided through numerous private institutions, including hospitals, clinics, healthcare centres and Chinese medicine halls.

In 2010, Columbia Asia Hospital, a chain of hospitals in Asia with 28 medical facilities across India, Malaysia, Vietnam and Indonesia was launched in Bukit Rimau.

Due to its proximity to Kota Permai Golf & Country Club and Bukit Kemuning Golf & Country Resort, Bukit Rimau has recently become a hub for specialty clinics that provide chiropractic, physiotherapy and rehabilitative care for spine, joint and sports injuries.

== Places of worship ==
Shah Alam Buddhist Society

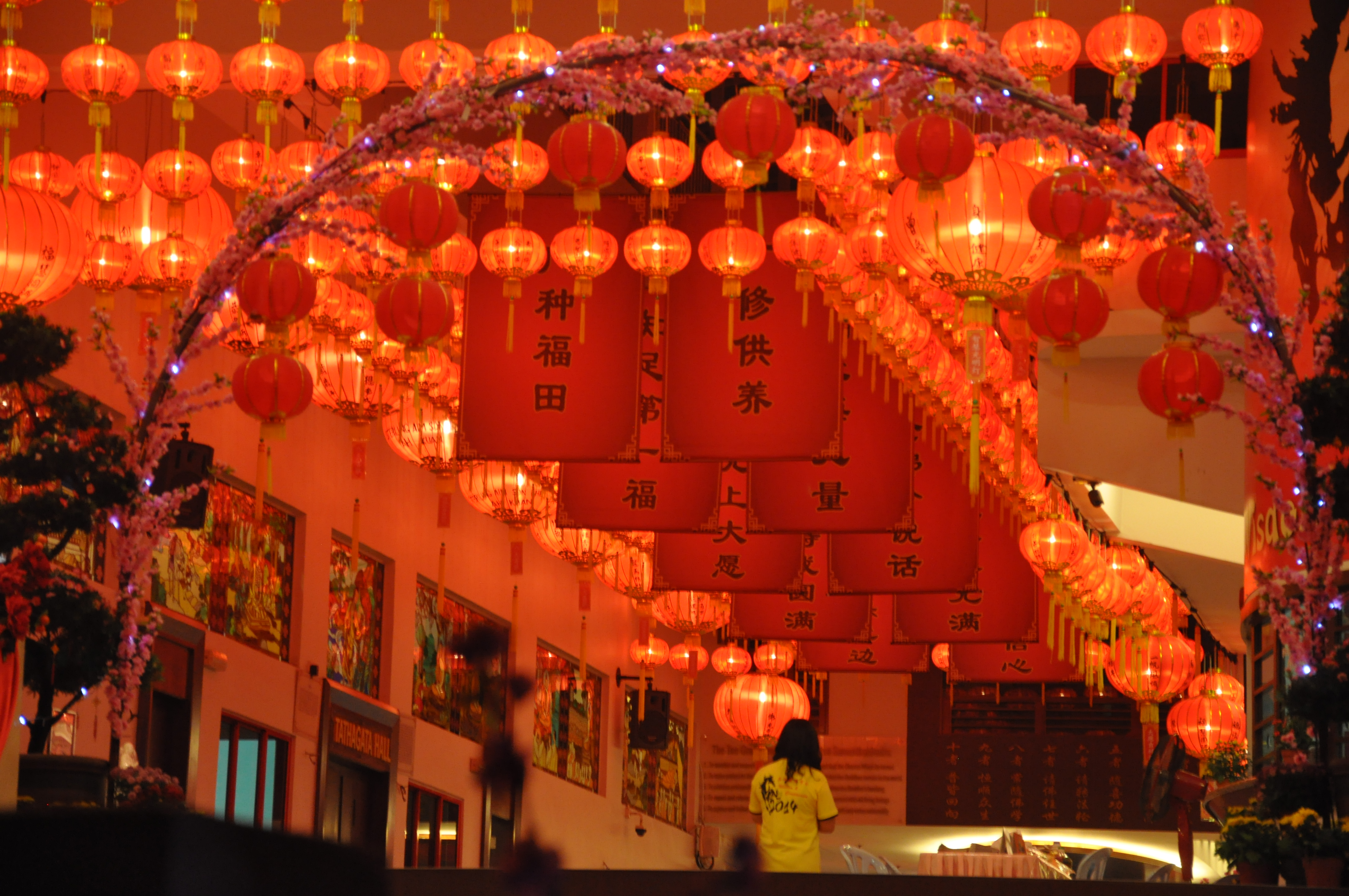
Bukit Rimau's Shah Alam Buddhist Society at night during the 2014 Chinese New Year celebrations

The Shah Alam Buddhist Society (SABS) is a major centre for Buddhism in the state. It is also a Wedding Registrar which is popular among Buddhist couples looking to get married.

In 2007, the society embarked on a quest to obtain the International Organization for Standardization (ISO) 9001 Quality Management System.

As a Buddhist society, SABS’s aim was to use ISO as a tool to create a well-documented management system that is guided by the Dharma. After two years of effort, SABS succeeded in achieving the ISO 9001:2008 certification.

The SABS complex consists of several large prayer halls, smaller meditation halls, the Avalokitesvara Gallery, Jivaka Free Chinese Medical Consultation Clinic and Manjushri Library.

Regular activities including Dharma Talks and the Sunday Dharma School are held here.

Sri Maha Mariamman Temple
Sri Maha Mariamman Temple is a Hindu temple serving the Hindu community in Kota Kemuning, Kemuning Utama, Bukit Rimau and Berjaya Park.

Surau An-Namira
Surau An-Namira is a Surau in Bukit Rimau.

== Sports and recreation ==
The greenery and abundance of cycling paths around Bukit Rimau has led to it becoming a popular destination for solo and group cyclists, who often hold get-togethers in the area.

Bukit Rimau is home to the 18-hole Bukit Kemuning Golf & Country Resort. The resort is sprawled over 150 acres and consists of a pro shop, swimming pool, gymnasium, food and beverage outlets, VIP room, seminar rooms and function room.

Community living in Bukit Rimau is further enhanced by the provision of several indoor and outdoor facilities within a clubhouse that includes a swimming pool, gymnasium, table tennis hall, library, children's playgrounds and a badminton and Sepak Takraw court.

=== Nearby ===
- Kota Kemuning Lakeside Park - 25-acre park surrounding a 22-acre lake that is suitable for jogging, picnics, basketball and kite flying
- Gamuda Walk Shopping Mall - neighbourhood shopping centre

=== Further out ===
- ÆON Bukit Tinggi Shopping Centre - Southeast Asia's largest Jusco store
- GM Klang Wholesale City
- Carey Island (Pulau Carey)
