= Malaysia Federal Route 286 =

Malaysian highway

Federal Route 286
- Shah Alam–Puchong Highway

Route information
- Maintained by Malaysian Public Works Department

Major junctions
- North end: Batu Tiga, Shah Alam
- Guthrie Corridor Expressway; FT 2 Federal Highway; North–South Expressway Central Link / AH2; BSA17 Persiaran Jubli Perak; BSA7 Persiaran Tengku Ampuan; Shah Alam Expressway; Damansara–Puchong Expressway
- South end: USJ

Location
- Country: Malaysia
- Primary destinations: Shah Alam, Subang Jaya, Puchong

Highway system
- Highways in Malaysia; Expressways; Federal; State

Federal Route 286, Shah Alam–Puchong Highway (Hicom Highway) (formerly Federal Route 3214 or Selangor State Route B7) is a major highway in Klang Valley region, Selangor, Malaysia.

It comprises part of Persiaran Jubli Perak, Jalan Batu Tiga Lama (Seksyen 26 Shah Alam), Persiaran Kuala Selangor, and Persiaran Klang.

== Junction lists ==
The entire route is located in Petaling District, Selangor.

Legend:

- I/C - Interchange, I/S - Intersection, RSA - Rest and service area, OBR - Overhead bridge restaurant, R/R - Restaurant and rest plaza, L/B - Layby, V/P - Vista point, TN - tunnel, T/P - Toll plaza, BR - Bridge
- C - Cloverleaf, S - Stack, T-A - Trumpet-A, T-B - Trumpet-B, DT - Directional-T/Y, SDT - Semi-Directional-T/Y, P-Y - Partial-Y, D - Diamond, P-C - Partial cloverleaf, D-D - Diverging diamond, D-R - Direct ramp

Location	km	mi	Exit	Name	Destinations	Notes	
Shah Alam			Through to Guthrie Corridor Expressway				
Shah Alam				Jalan Monfort	B9 Batu Tiga–Sungai Buloh Highway – Shah Alam Sports Complex, Shah Alam city centre, Section 1 until 14, Taman TTDI Jaya (Section U3), Subang Air Force Base (TUDM Subang) (Section U5), Monfort Boys Town (Section U1), Politeknik Sultan Salahuddin Abdul Aziz Shah (Section U1)	Junctions	
Shah Alam			Shell L/B (Batu Tiga bound) – Shell petrol stations with 7-Eleven, Naza showroom				
Shah Alam				Persiaran Kerjaya	FT 3213 Persiaran Kerjaya – Glenmarie, Sultan Abdul Aziz Shah Airport	T-junctions	
Shah Alam				Persiaran Sukan	Persiaran Sukan – Shah Alam Sports Complex, Shah Alam city centre, Section 1 until 14	T-junctions	
Shah Alam				Jalan Batu Tiga Lama (Glenmarie)	Jalan Batu Tiga Lama (Glenmarie) – Kampung Batu Tiga, Section U1	T-junctions	
Shah Alam				Batu Tiga	FT 2 Federal Highway – Shah Alam, Klang, Subang Jaya, Petaling Jaya, Kuala Lumpur	Diamond interchange	
Shah Alam				Central Sugar Refinery (CSR)	Central Sugar Refinery (CSR) – Hindu temple, Kampung Batu Tiga Lama, Batu Tiga Komuter station	T-junctions	
Shah Alam			Petron L/B (Bulatan Megawati bound) – Petron				
Shah Alam				Ebor North-NSECL	North–South Expressway Central Link / AH2 – USJ, Putra Heights, Bandar Saujana Putra, Kuala Lumpur International Airport (KLIA), Seremban, Malacca, Johor Bahru	From Batu Tiga only	
Shah Alam				Taman Perindustrian UEP Subang Jaya	Taman Perindustrian UEP Subang Jaya		
Shah Alam			Petron and Petronas L/B (Batu Tiga bound)				
Shah Alam				Masjid Ebor	Masjid Ebor		
Shah Alam				Ebor South-NSECL	No Entry	T-junctions; From NSECL only	
Shah Alam				High5	High5 bread factory – High5 Bread Town (Museum)		
Shah Alam				Jalan Batu Tiga Lama	BSA17 Persiaran Jubli Perak – Sections 16 until 22, Shah Alam City Centre	T-junctions; Turn off to continue along route	
Shah Alam				Taman Pinggiran USJ	Taman Pinggiran USJ		
Shah Alam				Subang Hi-Tech Industrial Park	Jalan Bukit Belimbing 26/38 – Subang Hi-Tech Industrial Park, F&N Coca-Cola Factory; BSA7 Persiaran Tengku Ampuan – Sections 16 until 22, Shah Alam City Centre	Junctions; Rejoin main road to continue along route	
Shah Alam				Hicom-SAE	FT 190 Malaysia Federal Route 190 – Kampung Bukit Kemuning, Taman Sri Muda (Section 25); Shah Alam Expressway – Kota Kemuning, Pulau Indah, West Port, South Port, North Port, Klang, Subang Jaya, Kuala Lumpur, Cheras, Kuantan	Diamond interchange	
Shah Alam				Proton Car Assembly Plant	Proton Car Assembly Plant		
Shah Alam				Persiaran Hulu Selangor	Persiaran Hulu Selangor – Section 26 until 27	T-junctions	
Shah Alam				Proton Car Assembly Plant	Proton Car Assembly Plant		
Shah Alam				Persiaran Klang	Persiaran Klang – Section 26 until 27	T-junctions	
Shah Alam	UEP Subang Jaya				USJ-NSECL	North–South Expressway Central Link / AH2 – Ipoh, Shah Alam, Kuala Lumpur International Airport (KLIA), Johor Bahru	T-junctions
Shah Alam	UEP Subang Jaya			Damansara–Puchong Expressway (Puchong West Link)			
Shah Alam	1.000 mi = 1.609 km; 1.000 km = 0.621 mi: Incomplete access; Route transition						
