= Kota Kemuning =

- Township
- Interactive map of Kota Kemuning
- Location within Selangor Location within Peninsular Malaysia
- Coordinates: 3°1′22.32″N 101°30′38.34″E
- Country: Malaysia
- State: Selangor
- Time zone: UTC+8 (MST)
  - Summer (DST): Not observed
- Postal code: 40470
- Calling code: 03
- Website: kotakemuning.online

Kota Kemuning is a township located in the constituency of Kota Raja, in Klang District, Selangor, Malaysia, just south of Shah Alam. Kota Kemuning borders Putra Heights on its east, across the Klang River.

== Background ==
It is developed by Hicom-Gamuda Development Sdn Bhd, a joint-venture company between DRB-HICOM and Gamuda Berhad. This township was Gamuda Land's first venture into property development in 1994 and is renowned as one of the Klang Valley’s finest residences with its healthy and harmonious living environment. Kota Kemuning is approximately 25 km southwest of Kuala Lumpur City Centre.

Kota Kemuning was within the municipal authority of Klang until a cession in 1994 transferred the township to Shah Alam City Council.

== Access ==
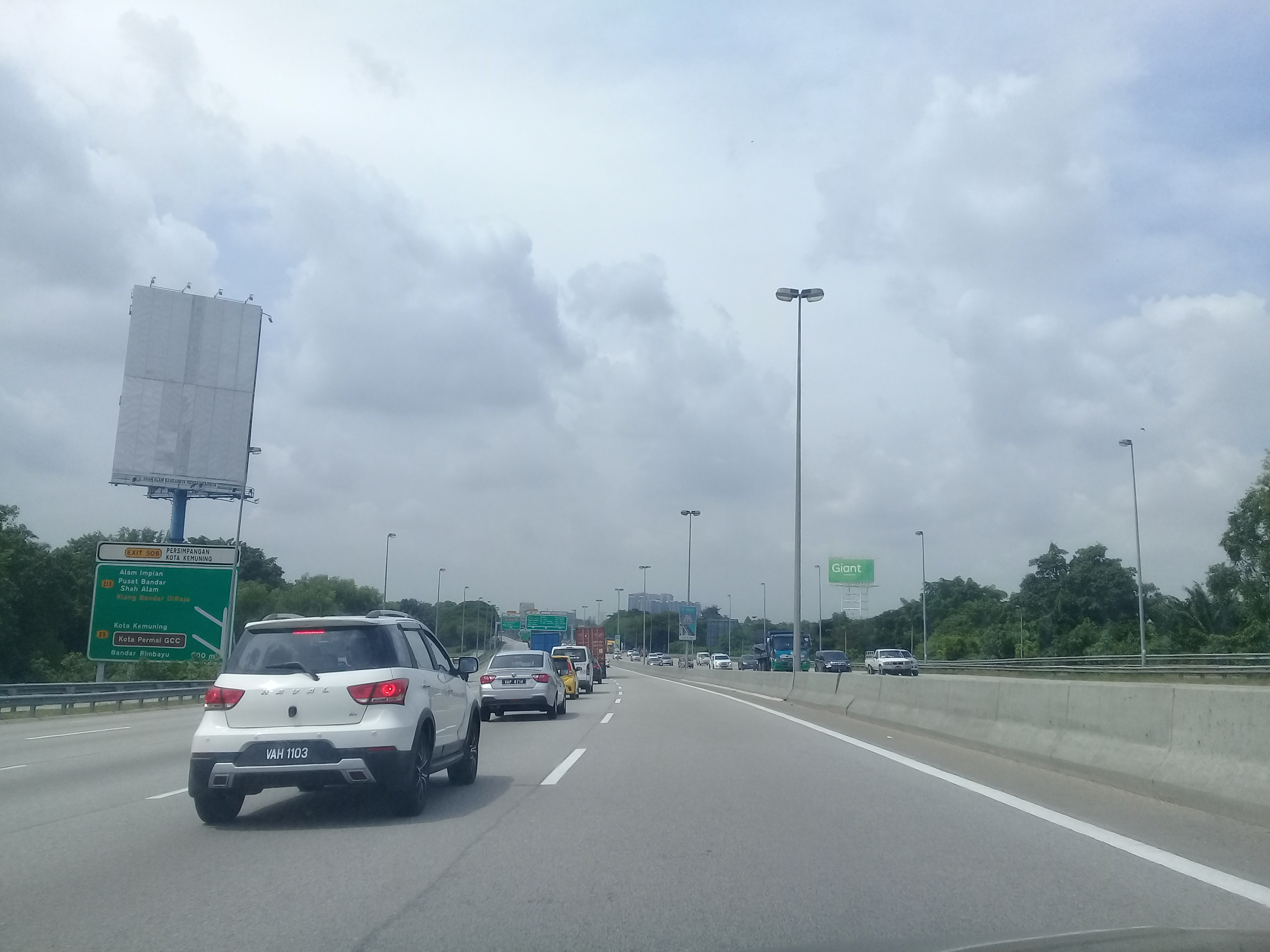
Kota Kemuning Interchange.

=== Car ===
It is accessible via various major highways and expressways namely KESAS 506, and the ELITE. A new expressway; Kemuning–Shah Alam Highway (LKSA), linking Kota Kemuning to downtown Shah Alam opened in 2010.

=== Public transportation ===
LRT Putra Heights is the closest rail station to Kota Kemuning by distance. The Smart Selangor bus route SA08 connects LRT Alam Megah to Kota Kemuning via HICOM. It is also accessible from KTM Shah Alam via Smart Selangor bus SA06 if coming from Shah Alam and Sri Muda.

RapidKL bus T756 goes towards Hentian Bandar Shah Alam in Section 14 via Taman Sri Muda. In addition, this bus connects with RapidKL bus 751 from Taman Sri Muda to Pasar Seni, Kuala Lumpur.

== Type of development ==
Kota Kemuning is a mixed residential and commercial development spanning across 1,820 acres (7.4 km^{2}) The residential developments consist of bungalows, semi-detached houses, link terrace houses, townhouses, condominiums and apartments. The commercial developments include commercial centres, shop offices, commercial land, and terraced and semi-dee factories. The township has an 18-hole golf course known as Kota Permai Golf and Country Club which has held various championships such as the Maybank Malaysian Open and the Volvo Masters. The township also has a park called Kota Kemuning Lakeside Park.

The design concept for Kota Kemuning was meant to make it a self-contained township centred on a resort and golf course living with facilities and amenities. Its key features are the Central Lake and Lakeside Drive with the continuous jogging track, and basketball courts as well as its Wetland and Hill Parks.

== Demographics ==
Ethnic composition of Kota Kemuning (2020)
Ethnicities / Nationality	Percentage
Chinese	61.3%
Malay	28.4%
Indians	9.9%
Others	0.4%

Kota Kemuning's population is primarily Chinese—61.3% Chinese, 28.4% Malay, 9.9% Indian and 0.4% other.

Ethnic groups in Kota Kemuning, 2020 census
Ethnicity	Population	Percentage
Chinese	11,744	56.30%
Bumiputera	5,435	26.05%
Indian	1,902	9.12%
Others	83	0.40%
Non-Malaysian citizens	1,696	8.13%
Total	20,860	100%
