= Malaysia Federal Route 3217 =

Road in Malaysia

Federal Route 3217
- Jalan Perindustrian Kapar–Meru

Route information
- Maintained by Malaysian Public Works Department
- Length: 17.8 km (11.1 mi)

Major junctions
- West end: Kapar
- FT 5 Federal Route 5 B1 State Route B1; Setia Alam Highway; West Coast Expressway; New North Klang Straits Bypass; B4 State Route B4; FT 20 North Klang Straits Bypass
- South end: Klang

Location
- Country: Malaysia
- Primary destinations: Meru, Setia Alam

Highway system
- Highways in Malaysia; Expressways; Federal; State

Federal Route 3217 or Jalan Perindustrian Kapar–Meru (formerly Selangor State Route B2 and B1), is an industrial federal road in Selangor, Malaysia.

The road comprises two sections: the north-south stretch from Meru to Klang city center is known as Jalan Meru and the east-west stretch from Meru to Kapar is known as Persiaran Hamzah Alang.

At most sections, the Federal Route 3217 was built under the JKR R5 road standard, with a maximum speed limit of 90 km/h (56 mph).

== Junction lists ==
The entire route is located in Klang District, Selangor.

Legend:

- I/C - Interchange, I/S - Intersection, RSA - Rest and service area, OBR - Overhead bridge restaurant, R/R - Restaurant and rest plaza, L/B - Layby, V/P - Vista point, TN - tunnel, T/P - Toll plaza, BR - Bridge
- C - Cloverleaf, S - Stack, T-A - Trumpet-A, T-B - Trumpet-B, DT - Directional-T/Y, SDT - Semi-Directional-T/Y, P-Y - Partial-Y, D - Diamond, P-C - Partial cloverleaf, D-D - Diverging diamond, D-R - Direct ramp

Location	km	mi	Name	Destinations	Notes
Kapar			Kapar	FT 5 Malaysia Federal Route 5 – Teluk Intan, Sabak Bernam, Kuala Selangor, Banting, Klang, Port Klang	T-junctions
Kapar			Taman Sentosa		
Kapar			Taman Kapar Mewah		
Kapar			Taman Kapar Ria		
Kapar			Kapar-WCE I/C	West Coast Expressway – Lumut, Sabak Bernam, Kuala Selangor, Ipoh, Klang, Shah Alam, Banting	T-junctions
Meru			Taman Perindustrian Meru		
Meru			Taman Meru V		
Meru			Taman Perindustrian Meru Indah		
Meru			Jalan Haji Abdul Manan 1	Jalan Abdul Manan – Meru, Klang Sentral	T-junctions
Meru			Taman Seri Puteri		
Meru			Meru	B1 Selangor State Route B1 – Kuala Selangor, Ijok, Batu Arang, Puncak Alam; Jalan Paip – Meru Cemetery	Junctions; Northern terminus of concurrency with B1
Meru			Jalan Haji Abdul Manan	Jalan Haji Abdul Manan – Kapar, Kuala Selangor	T-junctions
Setia Alam			Klang Sentral		
Setia Alam			Setia Alam	Setia Alam Highway – Setia Alam, Setia Eco Park, Setia City Mall New Klang Valley Expressway / AH141 – Ipoh, Kuala Lumpur, Kuala Lumpur International Airport, Johor Bahru	Directional-T interchange
Setia Alam			Setia Alam	Persiaran Setia Prima	LILO
Bukit Raja			Jalan Meru-WCE I/C	West Coast Expressway – Kapar, Kuala Selangor, Sabak Bernam, Ipoh	Parclo interchange/Inbound
Bukit Raja			Bukit Raja	Persiaran Sungai Keramat – Bandar Bukit Raja; Persiaran Astana – Bukit Raja industrial area, Setia Alam, Eco Ardence	Half-diamond interchange
Bukit Raja			Meru-NNKSB	New North Klang Straits Bypass – Port Klang, Kapar, Kuala Selangor	Ramp to Port Klang
Bukit Raja			Jalan Haji Sirat	B4 Selangor State Route B4 – Kapar, Kuala Selangor	T-junctions
Bukit Raja			Meru-NKSB	FT 20 North Klang Straits Bypass – Port Klang, Kapar, Kuala Selangor, Shah Alam, Kuala Lumpur New Klang Valley Expressway / AH141 – Ipoh, Kuala Lumpur, Kuala Lumpur International Airport, Johor Bahru	Diamond interchange
Klang			Klang	FT 5 Malaysia Federal Route 5 (through Jalan Sireh) – Klang City Centre, Shah Alam, Kuala Lumpur, Banting, Port Klang, Kapar, Kuala Selangor	Turn left only
Klang			Klang	FT 5 Malaysia Federal Route 5 (through Jalan Sireh) – Klang City Centre, Shah Alam, Kuala Lumpur, Banting, Port Klang, Kapar, Kuala Selangor	Roundabout; Entrance only Southern terminus of concurrency with B1
1.000 mi = 1.609 km; 1.000 km = 0.621 mi: Concurrency terminus
