= Selangor State Route B1 =

Road in Malaysia

Selangor Route 1
- Jalan Meru

Major junctions
- North end: Bandar Seri Coalfields
- FT 54 Federal Route 54; B49 State Route B49; FT 3217 Federal Route 3217
- South end: Klang

Location
- Country: Malaysia
- Primary destinations: Puncak Alam, Shah Alam, Meru, Setia Alam

Highway system
- Highways in Malaysia; Expressways; Federal; State

Selangor State Route B1, Jalan Meru is a major road in Selangor, Malaysia, connecting townships such as Setia Alam, Bukit Raja, Kapar, Meru and as far as Klang.

== Junction lists ==
The entire route is located in Selangor.

Legend:

- I/C - Interchange, I/S - Intersection, RSA - Rest and service area, OBR - Overhead bridge restaurant, R/R - Restaurant and rest plaza, L/B - Layby, V/P - Vista point, TN - tunnel, T/P - Toll plaza, BR - Bridge
- C - Cloverleaf, S - Stack, T-A - Trumpet-A, T-B - Trumpet-B, DT - Directional-T/Y, SDT - Semi-Directional-T/Y, P-Y - Partial-Y, D - Diamond, P-C - Partial cloverleaf, D-D - Diverging diamond, D-R - Direct ramp

District	Location	km	mi	Name	Destinations	Notes
Kuala Selangor	Bandar Seri Coalfields			Bandar Seri Coalfields	Persiaran Harum Pandan – Bandar Seri Coalfields; FT 54 Malaysia Federal Route 54 – Kuala Selangor, Ijok Bestari Jaya, Batu Arang, Paya Jaras, Sungai Buloh, Kuala Lumpur; Kuala Lumpur–Kuala Selangor Expressway – Kuala Selangor, Kuala Lumpur, Rawang, Ipoh	Junctions
Kuala Selangor	Puncak Alam			Sungai Buloh Bridge		
Kuala Selangor	Puncak Alam			Puncak Alam	Jalan Persiaran Puncak Alam 6 – Puncak Alam, Alam Jaya; B49 Selangor State Route B49 – Shah Alam, Subang, Puncak Perdana	Junctions
Kuala Selangor	Puncak Alam			Puncak Alam Layby		
Kuala Selangor	Puncak Alam			Puncak Alam	Persiaran Puncak Alam 3 – Puncak Alam	T-junctions
Kuala Selangor	Puncak Alam			UiTM Puncak Alam Campus	Jalan Akademik – Universiti Teknologi MARA (UITM) Puncak Alam Campus	T-junctions
Kuala Selangor	FELDA Bukit Cherakah			FELDA Bukit Cherakah	Jalan Felda Bukit Cherakah	T-junctions
Petaling	FELDA Bukit Cherakah			FELDA Bukit Cherakah	Jalan Bukit Cerakah 2 – Puncak Alam, Alam Jaya; Jalan Seri Jaya – Shah Alam, Subang, Puncak Perdana	Junctions
Klang	Meru			Meru	FT 3217 Malaysia Federal Route 3217 – Kapar, Jeram, Kuala Selangor; Jalan Paip – Meru Cemetery	Junctions
Klang	Meru			Meru–Klang	see also FT 3217 Malaysia Federal Route 3217	
1.000 mi = 1.609 km; 1.000 km = 0.621 mi: Concurrency terminus
