= Alam Budiman =

Human settlement in Malaysia

Coordinates: 3.143173°N 101.482751°E

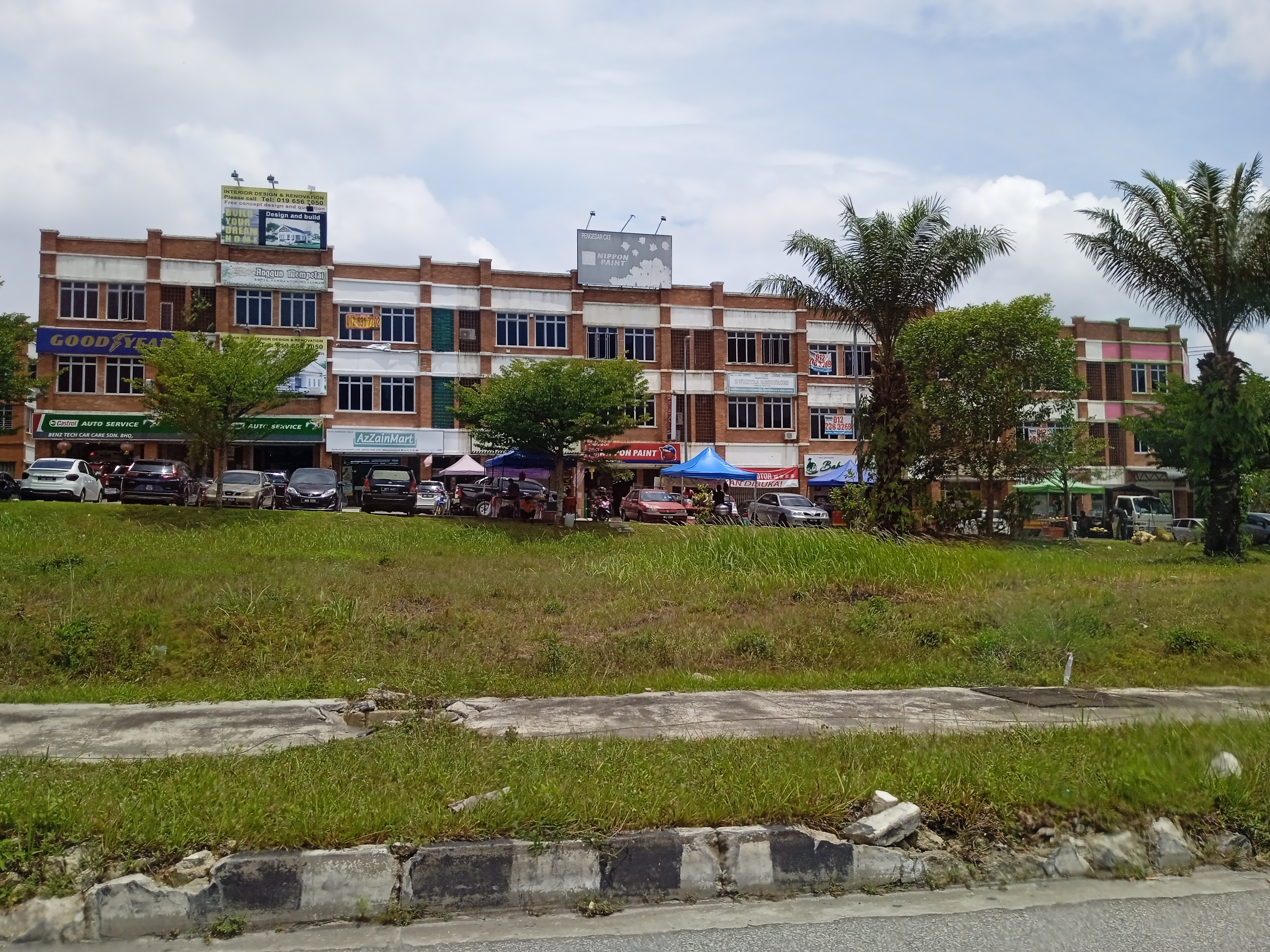
Alam Budiman shoplots from Persiaran Mokhtar Dahari.

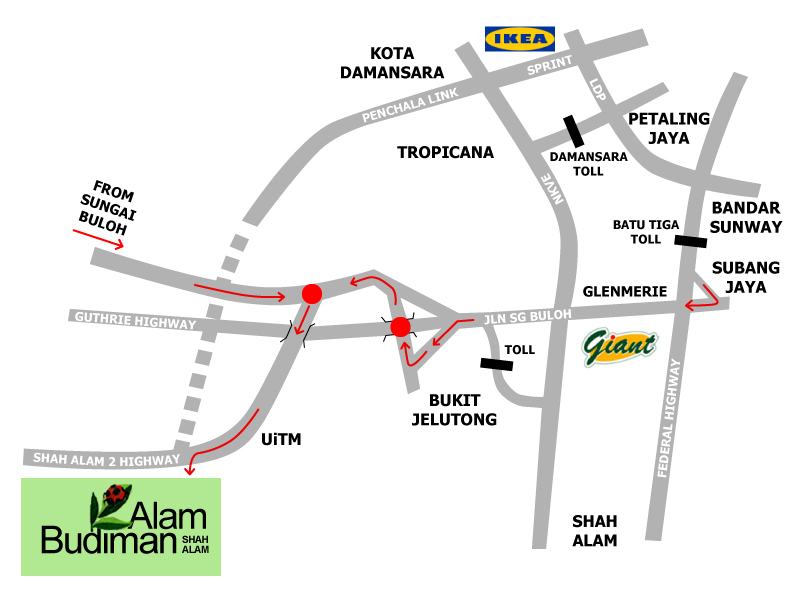
Alam Budiman Location Map

Alam Budiman is a township located at Section U10 Shah Alam, Selangor, Malaysia. It is roughly halfway between Central part of Shah Alam, and Kapar, Klang. Alam Budiman also borders Meru to the west and Setia Alam to the southwest. It is situated near the new UiTM Puncak Perdana campus.

Alam Budiman is connected by Persiaran Mokhtar Dahari B49 to the Guthrie Corridor Expressway Guthrie Corridor Expressway, which is a shortcut to Shah Alam from Rawang.

Adjacent townships include Puncak Perdana, Sunway Alam Suria, and Cahaya SPK.
