= Abu Sujak Mahmud =

Malaysian politician (1939–2021)

Yang Berbahagia Dato' Abu Sujak Mahmud DSSA SSA KMN PPT PJK
- ابو شجاع محمود

1st Mayor of Shah Alam
- In office 2000–2002
- Preceded by: Position established
- Succeeded by: Salamon Selamat

Deputy Menteri Besar of Selangor
- Monarch: Salahuddin
- Menteri Besar: Muhammad Muhammad Taib
- Constituency: Subang

Member of the Selangor State Legislative Assembly for Batu Tiga
- In office 1995–1999
- Preceded by: Mohd Zain Sulaiman (UMNO–BN)
- Succeeded by: Salamon Selamat (UMNO–BN)

Member of the Selangor State Legislative Assembly for Subang
- In office 1986–1995
- Preceded by: Constituency created
- Succeeded by: Constituency abolished

Personal details
- Born: Abu Sujak bin Mahmud; 4 January 1939 Kampung Jawa, Klang, Selangor
- Died: 11 February 2021 (aged 82) Section 4, Shah Alam, Selangor
- Resting place: Masjid Dato' Dagang Muslim Cemetery, Kampung Jawa, Klang, Selangor
- Citizenship: Malaysian
- Party: United Malays National Organisation (UMNO)
- Other political affiliations: Barisan Nasional (BN)
- Education: Klang High School
- Alma mater: University of Malaya
- Occupation: Politician

Abu Sujak bin Mahmud (4 January 1939 – 11 February 2021) was a Malaysian politician who served as Mayor of Shah Alam and Deputy Menteri Besar of Selangor.

== Death ==
On 11 February 2021, Abu Sujak died from old age. He was 82 years old.

== Election results ==
Selangor State Legislative Assembly
Year	Constituency	Candidate	Votes	Pct	Opponent(s)	Votes	Pct	Ballots cast	Majority	Turnout
1986	N31 Subang	Abu Sujak Mahmud (UMNO)	8,918	77.87%	Sumairi Awab (PAS)	2,535	22.13%	11,869	6,383	76.10%
1990	N31 Subang	Abu Sujak Mahmud (UMNO)	11,062	70.09%	Usulludin Jamil (S46)	4,720	29.91%	16,357	6,342	77.89%
1995	N35 Batu Tiga	Abu Sujak Mahmud (UMNO)	14,112	82.12%	Wan Ahmad Othman (PAS)	3,071	17.87%	17,494	11,041	71.97%

== Honours ==
=== Honours of Malaysia ===
- Malaysia
  - Officer of the Order of the Defender of the Realm (KMN) (1990)
- Selangor
  - Knight Companion of the Order of Sultan Salahuddin Abdul Aziz Shah (DSSA) – Dato' (1988)
  - Companion of the Order of Sultan Salahuddin Abdul Aziz Shah (SSA) (1985)
  - Recipient of the Distinguished Conduct Medal (PPT) (1982)
  - Recipient of the Meritorious Service Medal (PJK)
