= Setia Alam Highway =

Road in Malaysia

Setia Alam Highway (Persiaran Setia Alam)

Route information
- Maintained by Malaysian Public Works Department

Major junctions
- West end: Setia Alam West Interchange
- FT 3217 Federal Route 3217 New Klang Valley Expressway / AH141
- Southeast end: Setia Alam Interchange

Location
- Country: Malaysia
- Primary destinations: Setia Alam

Highway system
- Highways in Malaysia; Expressways; Federal; State

The Setia Alam Highway or Persiaran Setia Alam is a major highway in Selangor, Malaysia. It is also a main route to New Klang Valley Expressway via the Setia Alam Interchange.

The highway starts at the Setia Alam Interchange of the New Klang Valley Expressway E1 up to FT3217 Jalan Perindustrian Kapar–Meru interchange.

== History ==
The highway was built by S P Setia Berhad, who developed Setia Alam, a new township in Shah Alam. It was constructed in 2004 and was completed in 2006. The highway was opened to traffic on 14 July 2006 alongside the official opening of the new Setia Alam Interchange of the New Klang Valley Expressway.

At most sections, the highway was built under the JKR R5 road standard, allowing maximum speed limit of up to 90 km/h (56 mph).

== Interchange lists ==
The entire route is located in Petaling District, Selangor.

Legend:

- I/C - Interchange, I/S - Intersection, RSA - Rest and service area, OBR - Overhead bridge restaurant, R/R - Restaurant and rest plaza, L/B - Layby, V/P - Vista point, TN - tunnel, T/P - Toll plaza, BR - Bridge
- C - Cloverleaf, S - Stack, T-A - Trumpet-A, T-B - Trumpet-B, DT - Directional-T/Y, SDT - Semi-Directional-T/Y, P-Y - Partial-Y, D - Diamond, P-C - Partial cloverleaf, D-D - Diverging diamond, D-R - Direct ramp

Location	km	mi	Exit	Name	Destinations	Notes
Setia Alam			6	Setia Alam West I/C	FT 3217 Malaysia Federal Route 3217 – Meru, Puncak Alam, Kuala Selangor, Klang, Port Klang	Direction-T interchange
Setia Alam			5C	Setia Impian Exit	Jalan Setia Impian U13/6 – Lotus's Setia Alam, Setia Alam Mosque	Meru bound
Setia Alam			5A	Setia Murni Exit	Jalan Setia Murni U13/50 – Setia Murni	NKVE bound
Setia Alam			Petronas L/B and Pizza Hut Delivery (NKVE bound)			
Setia Alam			5B	Persiaran Setia Murni Exit	Persiaran Setia Murni – Setia Murni	NKVE bound
Setia Alam			4	Setia Alam; Setia Alam Sentral I/C	Persiaran Setia Perdana – Setia Murni, Setia Dagang, Setia City Convention Centre, Setia City Mall, S P Setia Headquarters; Persiaran Setia Indah – Setia Impian, Setia Prima, Central Park, Setia Indah, Bukit Raja	Diverging diamond interchange
Setia Alam			3A; 3B	Setia Dagang Exit; Setia Indah Exit	Persiaran Setia Dagang – Setia Dagang, Setia City Convention Centre, Setia City Mall, S P Setia Headquarters; Jalan Setia Indah U13/9 – Setia Indah, Central Park, Setia Alam Welcome Center	LILO exit
Setia Alam			2A	Setia Alam; Setia Alam East I/C	Persiaran Setia Prima – Setia Eco Park, Setia City Convention Centre, Setia City Mall, Setia Indah, Setia Damai, Eco Ardence	Diverging diamond interchange
Setia Alam			1A	Setia Eco Park Exit	Jalan Setia Nusantara U13/17 – Setia Eco Park	NKVE bound
Setia Alam			1B	Setia Tropika Exit	Jalan Setia Tropika U13/18S – Setia Eco Park, Tenby International School	NKVE bound
Setia Alam				Eco Ardence I/C	Persiaran Setia Damai – Eco Ardence, i-City, Bukit Raja	Half-diamond Interchange
Setia Alam			Setia Alam Toll Plaza			
Setia Alam	0.0	0.0	102	Setia Alam-NKVE I/C	New Klang Valley Expressway / AH141 – Bukit Raja, Klang, Port Klang, Shah Alam, Ipoh, Kuala Lumpur, Kuala Lumpur International Airport (KLIA), Johor Bahru	Direction-T interchange
1.000 mi = 1.609 km; 1.000 km = 0.621 mi: Electronic toll collection; Incomplete access
