= Jalan Meru LRT station =

Metro station in Selangor, Malaysia

SA19 Jalan Meru
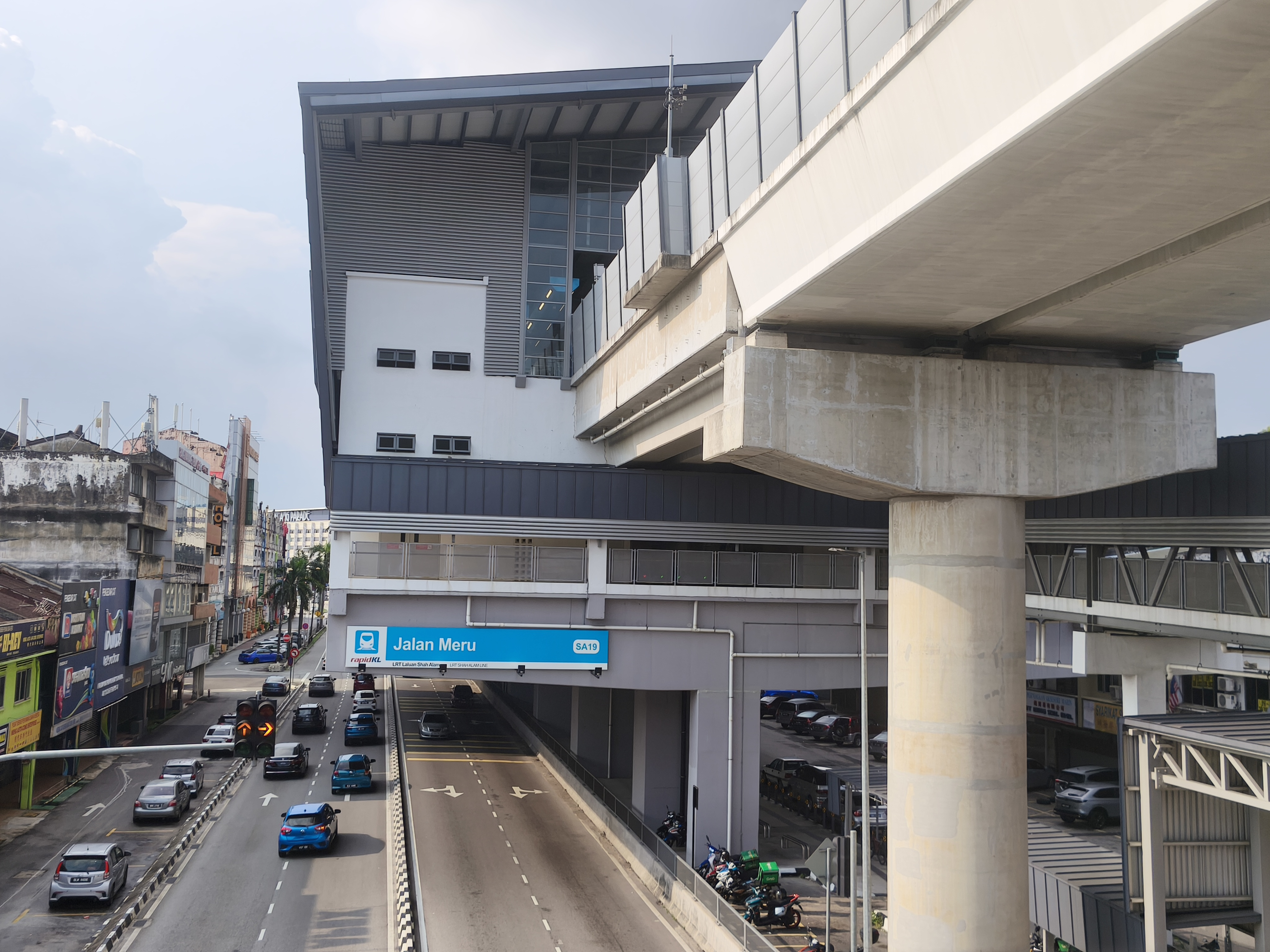

General information
- Other names: Malay: جالن مرو (Jawi); Chinese: 中路; Tamil: ஜாலான் மெரு
- Location: Klang, Selangor; Malaysia
- System: Rapid KL
- Owner: Prasarana Malaysia
- Operator: Rapid Rail
- Line: 11 Shah Alam Line
- Platforms: 2 side platforms
- Tracks: 2

Construction
- Structure type: Elevated
- Parking: Not available
- Accessible: Yes

Other information
- Station code: SA19

History
- Opened: 29 June 2026; 4 months ago

Services
Preceding station		Following station
Pasar Klang towards Bandar Utama	Shah Alam Line	Jambatan Kota towards Johan Setia
Location

The Jalan Meru LRT station is a light rapid transit (LRT) station that serves the suburb of Kawasan 17, Klang, Selangor, Malaysia. It is an elevated rapid transit station, and is one of the stations on the Shah Alam line. This station forms part of the Klang Valley Integrated Transit System.

== History ==
This is the nineteenth station along the RM9 billion line project, with the line's maintenance depot located in Johan Setia, Klang. It has facilities such as kiosks, restrooms, elevators, taxi stands, and feeder buses. Operations for the Shah Alam line and this station commenced on 29 June 2026.

== Locality landmarks ==
This station is located along its namesake road, Jalan Meru—a part of Federal Route 3217. It also serves Jalan Mantin and Jalan Sireh at a junction to the south of Jalan Meru. This station serves the neighbourhoods of Taman Eng Ann, Kawasan 17 & 18 Klang, Taman Jalan Meru, and Kampung Sungai Pinang. Major landmarks around the station include:

- New Business Centre(NBC) Commercial Park
- Sunshine Banquet Hall
- Your Hotel, Klang
- Klang Parade Shopping Centre
- Taman Bukit Intan, Klang
- Taman Jalan Meru
- SK (1) & (2) Jalan Meru
- Pantai Bharu
- Klang High School
- Pejabat Pelajaran Daerah (PPD), Klang
- Pelangi Promenade Business Park
- Seri Pelangi Apartment, Kawasan 17
- Pelangi Court Condominium
- Pelangi Indah Flat

== Station features ==
Like every other station on the Shah Alam line, this is an elevated station. There are three floors, with two side platforms on the second floor, the concourse on the first floor, and two entrances/exits on the ground floor. There are also facilities designed for the disabled, including tactile floor blocks, disabled toilets, braille on elevator buttons, and low-height elevator buttons and customer service centre counters for wheelchair users.

L2
Platform

Level

Side platform, doors will open on the left
→ Platform 1: 11 Shah Alam Line towards SA01 Bandar Utama (Pasar Klang)
← Platform 2: 11 Shah Alam Line towards SA26 Johan Setia (Jambatan Kota)
Side platform, doors will open on the left
L1
Concourse
Faregates to paid area, escalators, lifts, ticketing machines, kiosks, customer service counter
G
Ground Level
Feeder Bus Stop, Taxi Lay-By

Station concourse (July 2026)

Platform 1 and 2 (July 2026)

=== Exits and entrances ===
This station has two entrances. Entrance A is situated to the west of Jalan Meru, leading to nearby schools. Entrance B leads to the east of Jalan Meru, leading to nearby shoplots.

Shah Alam Line station
Entrance	Location	Destination	Picture
A	Western side of Jalan Meru	Feeder bus stop, taxi and private vehicle lay-by Jalan Meru (northbound), SK (1) & (2) Jalan Meru, Taman Meru, Taman Bukit Intan, Pejabat Pendidikan Daerah Klang	
B	Eastern side of Jalan Meru	Feeder bus stop, taxi and private vehicle lay-by Jalan Meru (southbound), Taman Eng Ann, Jalan Meru commercial area	

== Bus Services ==
The bus services serving this station are Smart Selangor bus route KLG2A and Wawasan Sutera bus route 704 (to Klang Sentral and Meru).

While there are no Rapid KL operated feeder buses, Rapid On-Demand (ROD) demand-responsive transit services are available, serving Taman Batu Belah and KTM Klang.
