= Selangor State Route B4 =

Road in Malaysia

Selangor Route 4
- Jalan Haji Sirat

Route information
- Length: 4.60 km (2.86 mi)

Major junctions
- West end: Kampung Batu Empat
- FT 5 Federal Route 5 New North Klang Straits Bypass / AH141; FT 3217 Federal Route 3217
- East end: Bukit Raja

Location
- Country: Malaysia
- Primary destinations: Bandar Bukit Raja

Highway system
- Highways in Malaysia; Expressways; Federal; State

Selangor State Route B4, Jalan Haji Sirat is a major road in Selangor, Malaysia.

== Features ==
- Dual carriageway

== Junction lists ==
The entire route is located in Klang District, Selangor.

Legend:

- I/C - Interchange, I/S - Intersection, RSA - Rest and service area, OBR - Overhead bridge restaurant, R/R - Restaurant and rest plaza, L/B - Layby, V/P - Vista point, TN - tunnel, T/P - Toll plaza, BR - Bridge
- C - Cloverleaf, S - Stack, T-A - Trumpet-A, T-B - Trumpet-B, DT - Directional-T/Y, SDT - Semi-Directional-T/Y, P-Y - Partial-Y, D - Diamond, P-C - Partial cloverleaf, D-D - Diverging diamond, D-R - Direct ramp

Location	km	mi	Name	Destinations	Notes
Klang			Kampung Batu Empat	FT 5 Malaysia Federal Route 5 – Teluk Intan, Sabak Bernam, Kuala Selangor, Kapar, Port Klang, Klang, Banting	T-junctions
Klang			Taman Cempaka Sari		
Klang			Taman Sungai Puloh	Jalan Sungai Puloh – Taman Sungai Puloh	T-junctions
Klang			Kapar-NNKSB I/C	New North Klang Straits Bypass / AH141 – Northport, Westport	Westbound ramp-in/out
Bukit Raja			Bandar Bukit Raja	Jalan Inang	T-junctions
Bukit Raja			Kampung Batu Belah	Persiaran Batu Belah	T-junctions
Bukit Raja			Taman Sungai Putus	Jalan Istimewa – Taman Sungai Putus	T-junctions
Bukit Raja			Taman Sri Pekan	Jalan Zapin – Taman Sri Pekan	T-junctions
Bukit Raja			Taman Bahagia	Jalan Bahagia – Taman Bahagia	T-junctions
Bukit Raja			Taman Sri Pekan	Jalan Zapin – Taman Sri Pekan	Eastbound LILO
Bukit Raja			Bukit Raja	FT 3217 Malaysia Federal Route 3217 – Puncak Alam, Meru, Klang, Shah Alam, Kuala Lumpur	T-junctions
1.000 mi = 1.609 km; 1.000 km = 0.621 mi: Incomplete access
