= Denai Alam =

Human settlement in Malaysia

Coordinates: 3°09′40.6″N 101°30′40.5″E

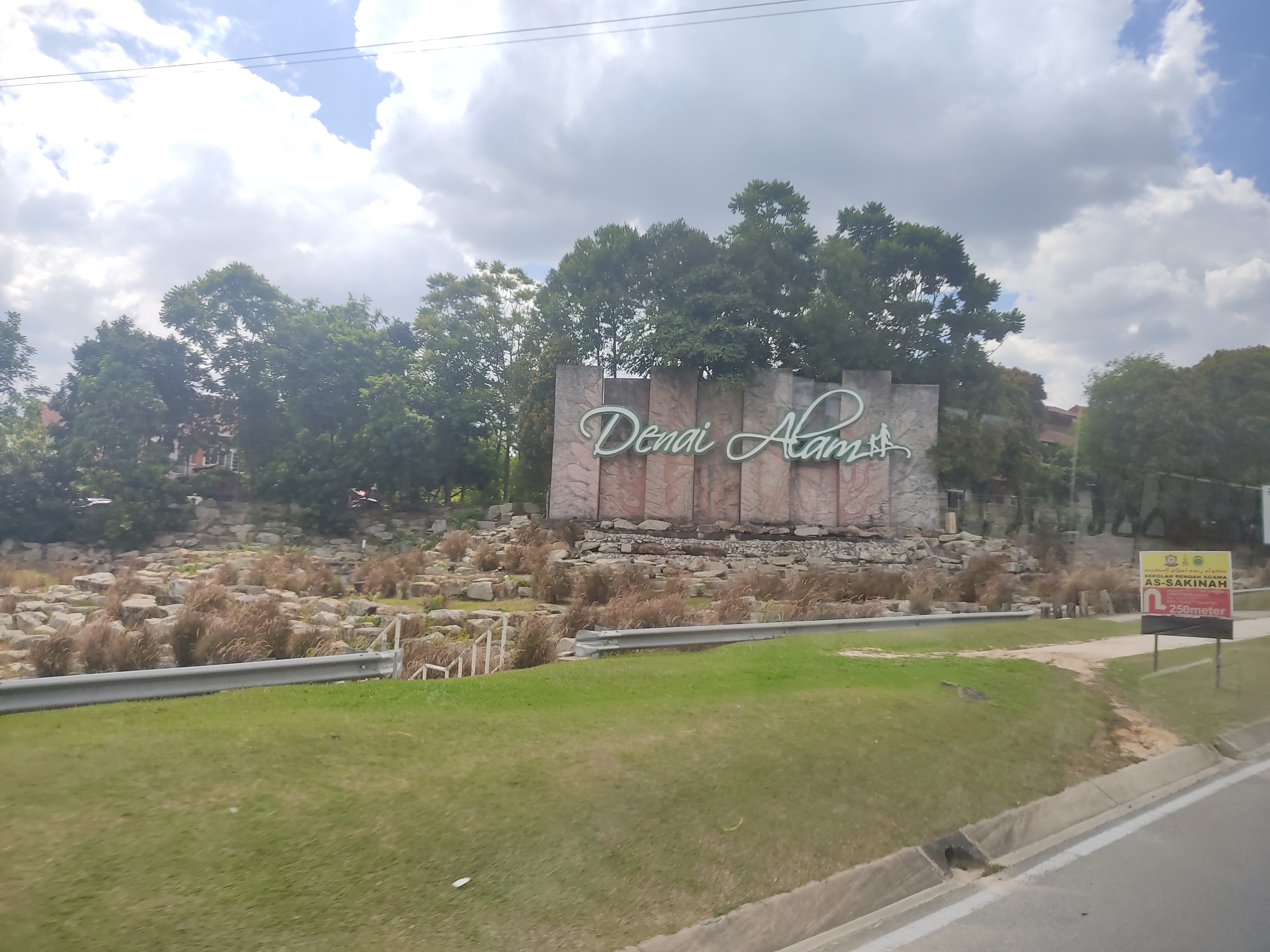
Denai Alam

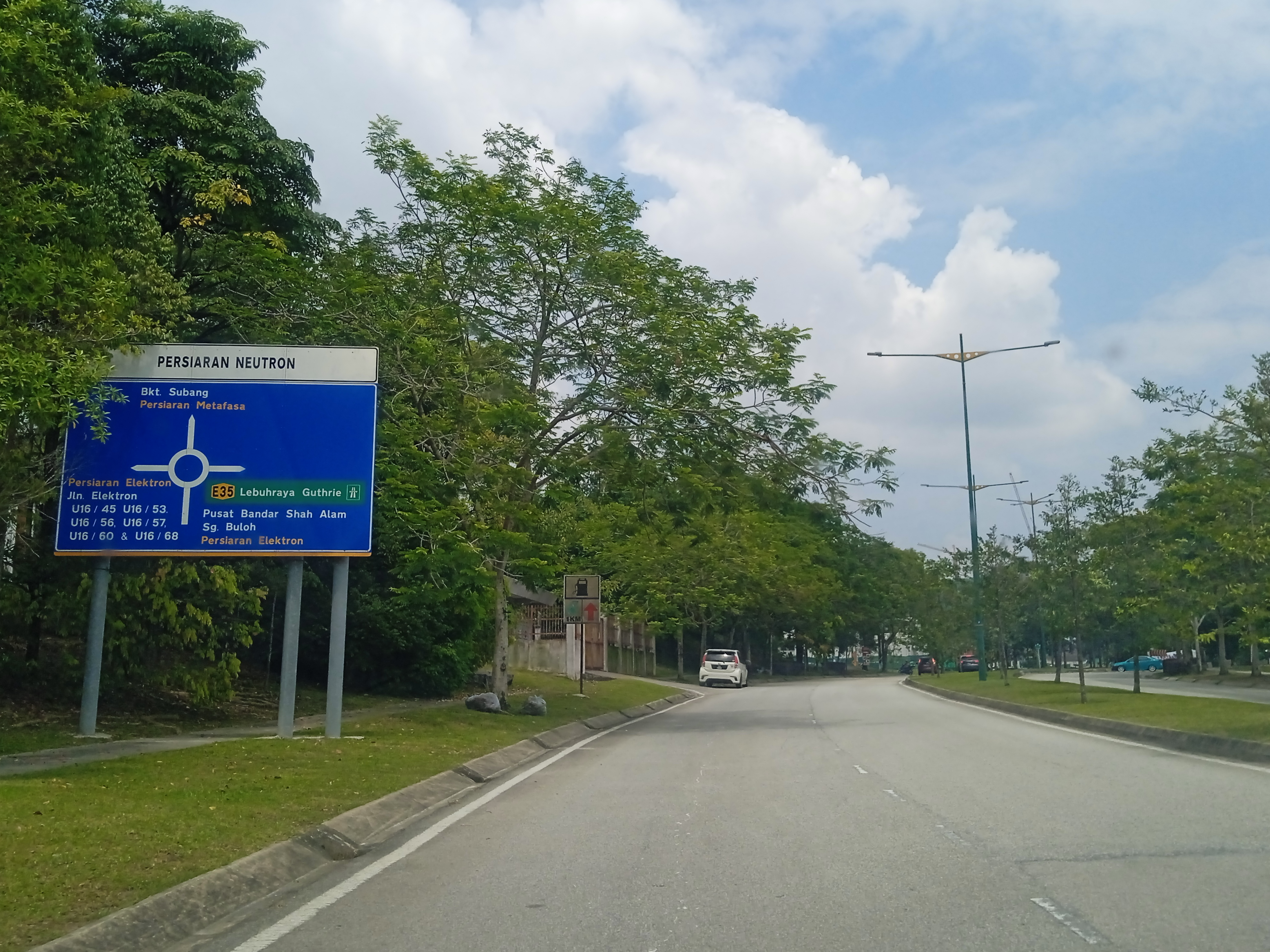
Persiaran Neutron in Denai Alam section.

Denai Alam is an affluent and upscale township located approximately 10 km north of the Shah Alam city centre alongside the Guthrie Corridor Expressway and is a part of Mukim Bukit Raja in Petaling District.

The township was developed by Sime Darby Property, the property development arm of the Malaysian conglomerate, Sime Darby Berhad. The 920 acres (3.7 km^{2}) township is planned based on the “Denai” concept which is 4.8 km of landscaped footpaths for pedestrians and non-motorised vehicles. The Denai concept was inspired by traditional Malay kampong communal living and a low-density development of 8 units per acre. The Denai Alam development was awarded the 2003 Planning Innovation Award by the Malaysian Institute of Planners.

Denai Alam is also notable for distressing traffic jam during peak hours every day due to terrible traffic planning at the exit heading towards the Petaling Jaya direction on Persiaran Elektron. This was partly due to mis-planned crossroads with prolonged traffic lights sessions and growing number of residents, which implies high traffic volume.

== Access ==
Denai Alam can be accessed from major population centres in Klang Valley either through the Guthrie Corridor Expressway which in turn is connected to the New Klang Valley Expressway, or the NKVE North–South Expressway Northern Route AH2 and the North–South Expressway Central Link, NSECL North–South Expressway Central Link, (Malay: Lebuhraya Utara Selatan Hubungan Tengah) also known as the ELITE Highway or via State Road B9, more popularly known as Jalan Sungai Buloh.

=== Public transportation ===
The MRT feeder bus route T772 from MRT Kwasa Sentral station (previously RapidKL bus route T772 from Subang Airport) serve the Denai Alam commercial centre. Aside from that the SA10 bus route know has several bus stops in Denai Alam, allowing access to several secondary schools, namely, SMK Bukit Jelutong and SMK Kampung Melayu Subang.

== Public amenities ==
Based on the development plan, a mosque, a police station, a fire station, two community halls, primary and secondary schools will be built.
