= Klang/old =

Klang may refer to:

- Klang, Malaysia, a city and major port in Selangor, Malaysia.
- Klang District, a district which contains the city of Klang, but does not administer it.
