= Maleisië Nieuws =

Dutch language news aggregator in Malaysia

Maleisië Nieuws is a news aggregator that collects and distributes Dutch news articles on Malaysia. The site is maintained from the city of Seri Kembangan in Petaling District, Malaysia.

== Overview and history ==
Part of Maleisie.be, originally formed in 2001, Maleisië Nieuws has been active since 2007. Privately owned and independent, it is the first news source on Malaysia in the Dutch language published from within Malaysia.

Maleisië Nieuws maintains a free accessible archive containing thousands of articles from 1992 to the present.
