= Meru, Malaysia =

Town in Klang District, Selangor, Malaysia

Meru
- Town
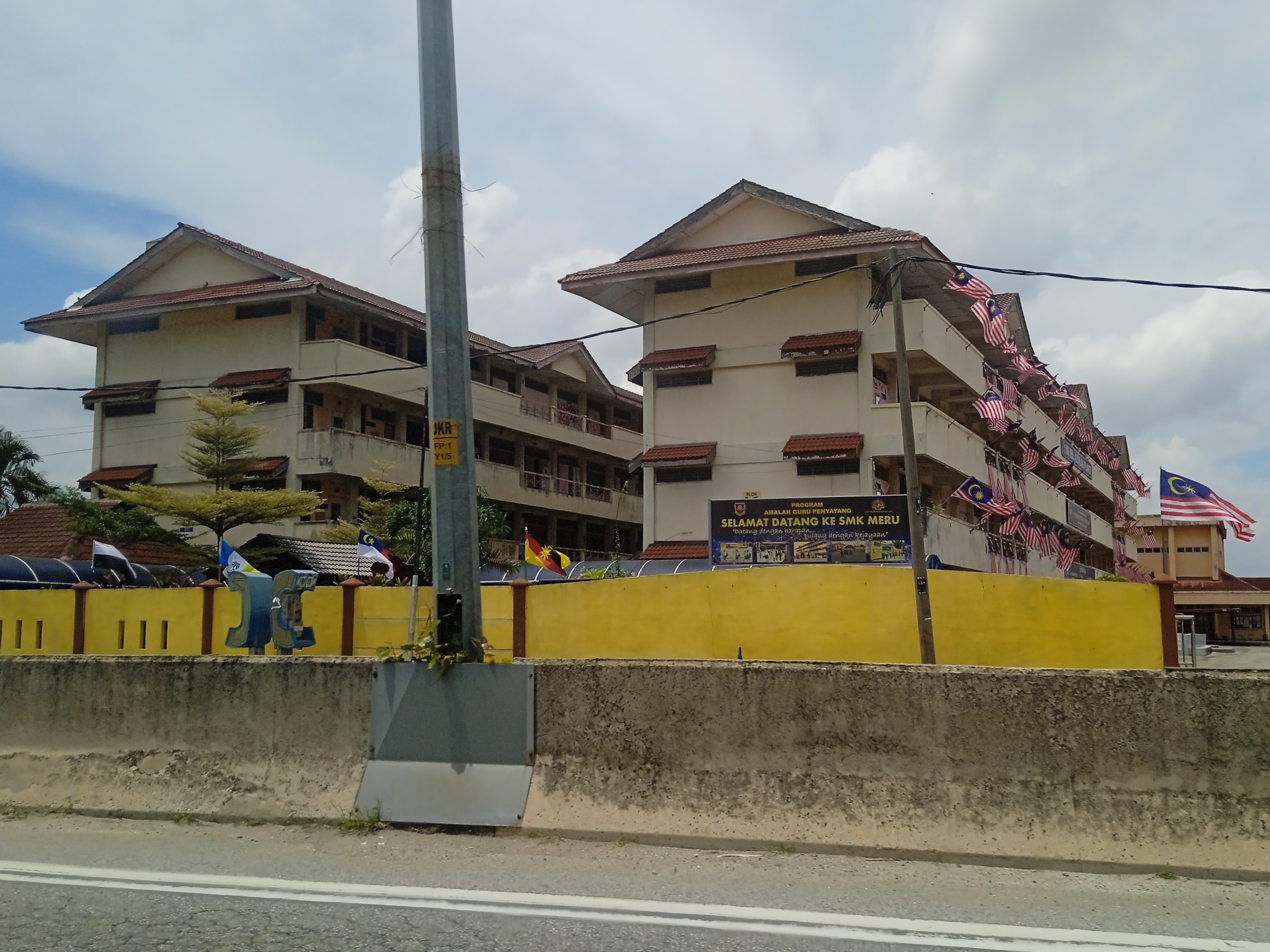
- SMK Meru in Meru
- Interactive map of Meru
- Coordinates: 3°08′10″N 101°26′22″E
- Country: Malaysia
- State: Selangor
- District: Klang

Meru in Klang District

Meru is a town in Klang District, Selangor, Malaysia. It is located less than 10 km from the heart of Klang; reaching Meru takes a 45-minute drive from Kuala Lumpur via the New Klang Valley Expressway and a 15-minute drive from Klang via FT 3217 (Jalan Meru).

== Industry ==
Meru is home to numerous small and medium-sized industrial complexes, including the nation's largest producer of latex gloves, Top Glove.

This town is currently losing its prominence, especially the Klang Parade as there are newer towns in Klang. One location that is currently experiencing an upsurge in popularity is Bandar Bukit Tinggi, a relatively newer and more modern town area in the south of Klang and AEON Bukit Tinggi, which previously held the title of the biggest AEON shopping mall in Malaysia. Due to that, Klang Parade is facing difficulties in attracting customers.

== Development ==
Recent property developments at nearby areas such as Setia Alam (part of Shah Alam under Petaling District), Klang Sentral and Bandar Bukit Raja are all set to see a raise in traffic volume.

== Transportation ==
Meru can be directly accessed from the New Klang Valley Expressway (NKVE) tolled-highway through the NKVE-Setia Alam Link, and mainly served by the Federal Route 3217 (Jalan Meru and Persiaran Hamzah Alang portions) in the town centre, as well as State Route B1 (Jalan Meru Tambahan portion) towards Bukit Kapar and Kuala Selangor.

The closest light rail transit (LRT) station is the Pasar Klang LRT station located roughly 8 kilometres south from the town centre. The Jalan Meru LRT station is also named after the FT 3217 road and located further south heading towards the city centre. Both stations are located above Jalan Meru and served by the Shah Alam line which opened on 29 June 2026.
