= Klang Sentral =

Taxi and bus terminal at Klang Sentral

Klang Sentral is a commercial hub in the northern part of the royal town of Klang in Selangor, Malaysia. Developed by Titijaya Group's subsidiary of NPO Development, the RM300 million development is expected to take up 83 acres (340,000 m^{2}) of freehold land.

Klang Sentral is also the new controversial and highly debated ultra-modern transport terminal for the local and intercity bus and taxi services in Klang. The RM40 million bus and taxi terminal which started to operate on 27 December 2008 is located nearby to the Setia Alam (part of Shah Alam) and Aman Perdana (part of Klang) townships. It is situated about 9 kilometers away from the Klang town centre.

== History ==
Klang Sentral was a Build-Operate-Transfer (BOT) project between the developer and the Klang Municipal Council (MPK). The concession agreement was signed in January 2007 during the administration of the former Barisan Nasional state government in Selangor.

The project was planned by Selangor State Urban Planning Department (JPBD) for the development of Klang Town in the 1990s. The plan was taken seriously by Klang Municipal Council (MPK) when the former Klang bus and taxi terminal was burnt down by fire on 19 May 2003 and increasing traffic congestion in the town.

The developer of Klang Sentral had built the terminal and contribute the 6 acres (24,000 m^{2}) land to the state government, with total cost of RM 40million to the developer. For this reason, the developer was given a 30-year concession rights to operate the bus and taxi terminal after which the ownership of the terminal shall be given to MPK. It is one of the few project that is continued by the administration of Pakatan Rakyat state government in Selangor.

However, if MPK decides not to relocate the former Klang bus and taxi terminal (which is located right in the heart of the town centre) to Klang Sentral, MPK will have to pay a sum of RM13 million compensation charges to the developer.

=== Opening and controversies ===
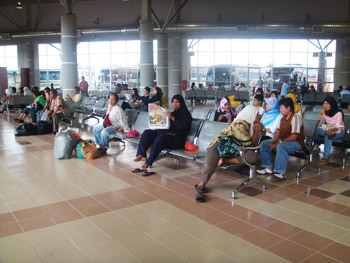
Fully air-conditioned waiting area with comfortable seats for public transport users.

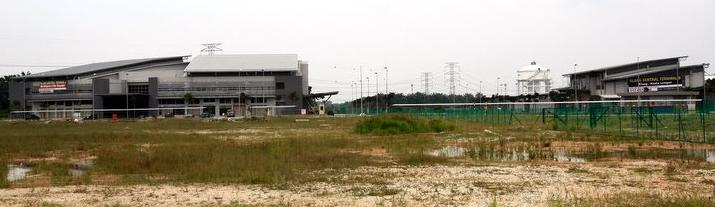
The express and local stage bus terminal on the left and the Kuala Lumpur-bound bus terminal on the right at Klang Sentral, separated by the Petronas gas pipeline land in between.

Even though before the new bus and taxi terminal at Klang Sentral starts to operate, there have been a few controversies surrounding the project. The development itself is located at the far north end of Klang and is not within the vicinity of the Klang town centre. It is also located far away from the Klang Komuter station. Many passengers and bus operators have complained about the higher transportation costs and longer time spent to commute around.

Bus operators at Klang Sentral were being charged RM900 of rental fees per month compared with just RM150 at the old Klang bus terminal in the town centre. At the same time, buses are now charged RM10 per entry at Klang Sentral compared with just RM2 at the old station previously. Shops and stall traders at Klang Sentral have also complained about high rental charges. The single-way bus fare to Kuala Selangor from the former bus station was RM4 while the fare from Klang Sentral is RM5.30.

After clarification with Cityliner, the largest bus operator in Malaysia, it is confirmed that single-way bus fare to Kuala Selangor from former bus station is RM5.30, while it is only RM 4.30 from Klang Sentral. Cityliner reaffirmed that there shall be no additional cost passed to the consumer.

The Klang Consumer Association had been protesting against the relocation of the terminal to Klang Sentral since 2005. In addition to that, there are numerous industrial factories nearby, which is a cause for environmental concerns. Also, Klang Sentral is expected to increase the already bad major traffic congestion along Jalan Meru and Jalan Kapar, the two main artery roads in Klang.

After 9 months of operations, Klang Sentral Terminal B for local buses closed down, in June 2009. Terminal A for outstation buses is still open.

== Terminals ==
=== Terminal A ===
Terminal A was the main terminal building of Klang Sentral, boasting modern facilities such as air-conditioned lounge, public address system and ample waiting/holding bay for buses.

However the terminal has been closed in May 2025, and all buses moved their stop to Terminal B (Terminal Sani) since.

=== Old Terminal B (local bus terminal) ===
Original Terminal B was allocated for local buses. However this terminal closes down 9 months after started their operation.

=== New Terminal B (Terminal Sani) ===
A new Terminal B building, fully operated by the major interstate express bus operator Sani Ekspres started its operation on 2014. Originally meant to serve exclusively Sani Ekspres buses, all interstate buses moved to Terminal B after the closure of Terminal A in 2025.
