= Portman College =

College in Petaling, Selangor, Malaysia

Portman College is a private business college located in Seri Kembangan, Petaling District, Selangor, Malaysia. It was formerly known as Institute Rangkaian Komputer (Computer Network Institute).

== History ==
In 2002, the college was renamed Portman College after establishing a partnership with the Portman Business School in Singapore.

In 2012, the college was bought over by Mr. Ernie Chen, the co-founder and Group CEO of the ATCEN Group of Companies based in Malaysia. As a result of its rebranding exercise in September 2012, Portman College began to focus primarily on business and media communication education. Since then, the college has undertaken major development and marketing efforts.
