= Subang (state constituency) =

Selangor constituency

Defunct state constituency
- Legislature: Selangor State Legislative Assembly
- Constituency created: 1984
- Constituency abolished: 1995
- First contested: 1986
- Last contested: 1990

Subang was a state constituency in Selangor, Malaysia, that was represented in the Selangor State Legislative Assembly from 1986 to 1995.

The state constituency was created in the 1984 redistribution and was mandated to return a single member to the Selangor State Legislative Assembly under the first past the post voting system.

== History ==
It was abolished in 1995 when it was redistributed.

=== Representation history ===
Members of the Legislative Assembly for Subang
Assembly	No	Years	Member	Party
Constituency created from Kampong Jawa
7th	N31	1986–1990	Abu Sujak Mahmud	BN (UMNO)
8th	N31	1990–1995	Abu Sujak Mahmud	BN (UMNO)
Constituency abolished, split into Subang Jaya and Sungai Renggam

== Election results ==
Selangor state election, 1990
Party	Candidate	Votes	%	∆%
BN	Abu Sujak Mahmud	11,062	70.09	▼7.77
S46	Usulludin Jamil	4,720	29.91	▲29.91
Total valid votes		15,782	100.00	
Total rejected ballots		575		
Unreturned ballots		546		
Turnout		16,903	80.49	▲4.39
Registered electors		21,000		
Majority		6,342	40.19	▼15.55
BN hold		Swing		

Selangor state election, 1986
Party	Candidate	Votes	%
BN	Abu Sujak Mahmud	8,918	77.87
PAS	Sumairi Awab	2,535	22.13
Total valid votes		11,453	100.00
Total rejected ballots		416	
Unreturned ballots			
Turnout		11,869	76.10
Registered electors		15,596	
Majority		6,383	55.73
This was a new constituency created.
