= Tenby International School =

Group of international schools in Malaysia

The Tenby International School network is a group of international schools in Malaysia which was founded in 1960 and admits children aged 3–18. There are schools in Ipoh, Penang, Setia Alam, Iskandar Puteri and Semenyih. A new campus at Kota Kemuning opened in September 2018.

Tenby is a member of International Schools Partnership (ISP), a network of global community consisting of more than 82 international schools across 23 countries worldwide.

Tenby schools used to have a campus in Miri, Sarawak that was launched in 2011. In 2020, it was rebranded as Knewton Global Schools.
