= Pasar Klang LRT station =

Metro station in Selangor, Malaysia

SA18 Pasar Klang
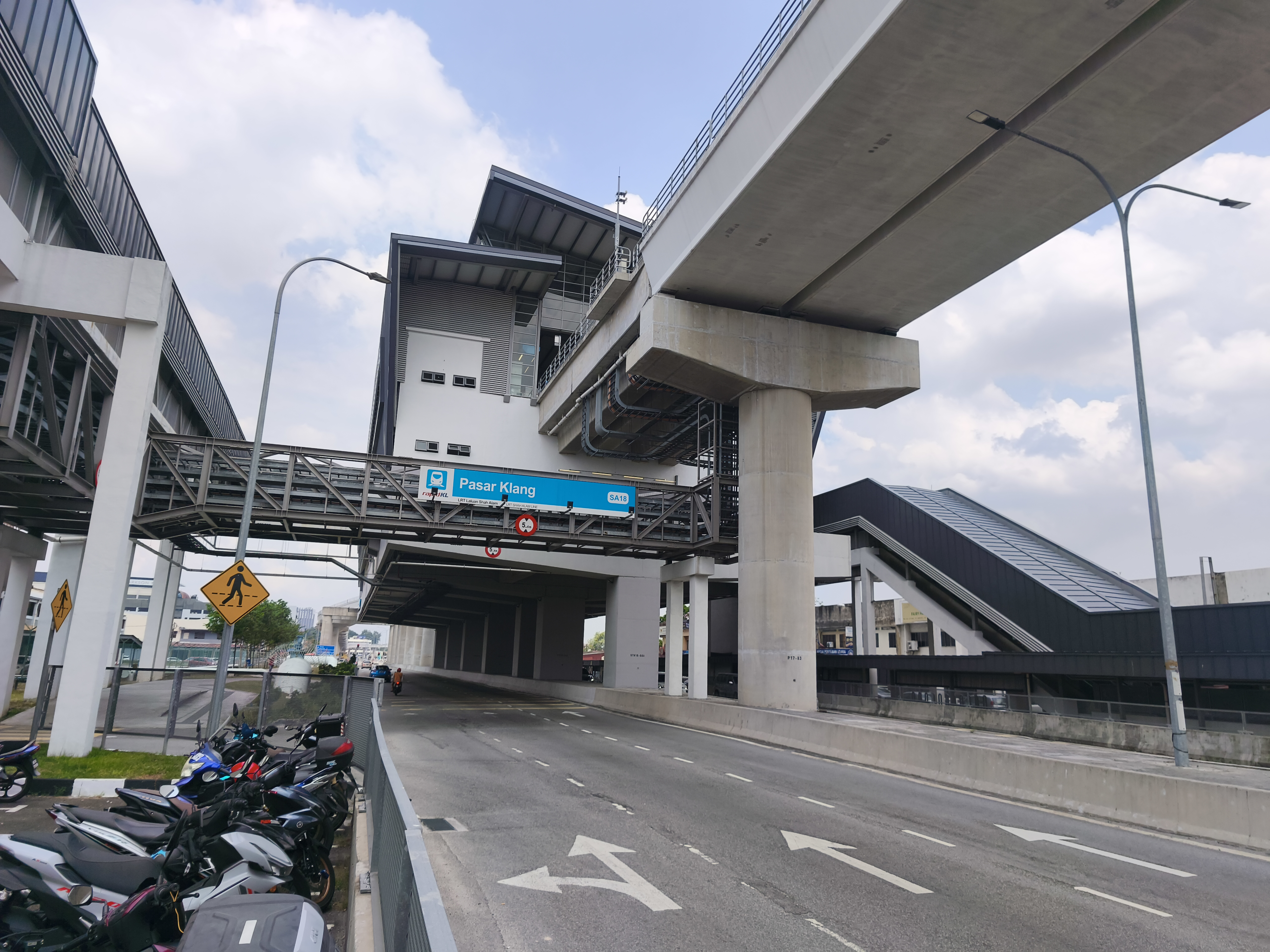

General information
- Other names: Malay: ڤاسر کلڠ (Jawi); Chinese: 中路大巴刹; Tamil: பசார் கிள்ளான்
- Location: Klang, Selangor; Malaysia
- System: Rapid KL
- Owner: Prasarana Malaysia
- Operator: Rapid Rail
- Line: 11 Shah Alam Line
- Platforms: 2 side platforms
- Tracks: 2

Construction
- Structure type: Elevated
- Parking: Available, 100 parking bays.
- Accessible: Yes

Other information
- Station code: SA18

History
- Opened: 29 June 2026; 4 months ago
- Former names: Pasar Besar Klang

Services
Preceding station		Following station
Bandar Baru Klang towards Bandar Utama	Shah Alam Line	Jalan Meru towards Johan Setia
Location

The Pasar Klang LRT station is a light rapid transit (LRT) station that serves the suburb of Kawasan 17 Klang in Selangor, Malaysia. It is one of the stations on the Shah Alam line. The station is an elevated rapid transit station in Klang, Selangor, Malaysia, forming part of the Klang Valley Integrated Transit System.

== History ==
This is the eighteenth station along the RM9 billion line project, with the line's maintenance depot located in Johan Setia, Klang. It has facilities such as a park and ride, kiosks, restrooms, elevators, taxi stands, and feeder buses. Operations for the Shah Alam line and this station commenced on 29 June 2026.

== Locality landmarks ==
This station is situated along Jalan Meru, a part of Federal Route 3217. To the south of this station along the road is a junction leading to Jalan Kedah and Jalan Pekan Baru, and to the north, a ramp leading to Port Klang through the New North Klang Straits Bypass.

This station serves the neighbourhoods of Kawasan 17, 18 & 19 Klang, Kampung Batu Belah, Taman Bunga Melor, Taman Mutiara, Taman Seri Pekan, Bandar Bukit Raja, Mutiara Bukit Raja, the Bukit Raja Industrial Area, and the Batu Belah Industrial Area. Major landmarks around the station include:

- Pasar Besar Klang
- Klang Parade
- TM Point Klang
- Taman Bunga Melor, Klang
- Batu Belah
- Mutiara Bukit Raja
- Bandar Bukit Raja

== Station features ==
Like every other station on the Shah Alam line, this is an elevated station. There are three floors, with two side platforms on the second floor, the concourse on the first floor, and two entrances/exits on the ground floor. There are also facilities designed for the disabled, including tactile floor blocks, disabled toilets, braille on elevator buttons, and low-height elevator buttons and customer service centre counters for wheelchair users. There is a Park N' Ride facility at this station, which has a capacity of 100 vehicles.

L2
Platform

Level

Side platform, doors will open on the left
→ Platform 1: 11 Shah Alam Line towards SA01 Bandar Utama (Bandar Baru Klang)
← Platform 2: 11 Shah Alam Line towards SA26 Johan Setia (Jalan Meru)
Side platform, doors will open on the left
L1
Concourse
Faregates to paid area, escalators, lifts, ticketing machines, kiosks, customer service counter
G
Ground Level
Park N' Ride, Feeder Bus Stop, Taxi Lay-By

Station concourse (August 2026)

Platform 1 and 2 (August 2026)

=== Exits and entrances ===
This station has two entrances. Entrance A is situated at the west of Jalan Meru, leading to Taman Bunga Melor. Entrance B leads to the east of Jalan Meru, serving Pasar Besar Klang.

Shah Alam Line station
Entrance	Location	Destination	Picture
A	Western side of Jalan Meru	Feeder bus stop, taxi and private vehicle lay-by Jalan Meru (northbound), Taman Bunga Melor	
B	Eastern side of Jalan Meru	Feeder bus stop, taxi and private vehicle lay-by Jalan Meru (southbound), Park N' Ride, Pasar Besar Klang, Pasar Borong Klang	

== Bus Services ==
There are two feeder buses available serving from this station.

Route No.	Origin	Destination	Via	Image
T728	SA18 Pasar Klang	Setia City Mall; Klang Parade	Jalan Hj Sirat; Persiaran Batu Belah; Persiaran Sungai Keramat; Persiaran Astana; Persiaran Setia Indah; Persiaran Setia Dagang; Persiaran Setia Wawasan	
T729	SA18 Pasar Klang	Bandar Bukit Raja Town Park; Klang Parade	Jalan Hj Sirat; Jalan Inang; Persiaran Batu Belah; Jalan Gamelan; Jalan Makyong; Jalan Sungai Puloh; Persiaran Bandar Bukit Raja	

Other bus services are available like Wawasan Sutera bus route 704 (to Klang Sentral and Meru). Klang Sentral is a major bus interchange for the Rapid KL bus route 753 (to Setia Alam, Shah Alam & UiTM Puncak Alam), as well as the Smart Selangor bus route KLG4 to Taman Seri Kerayong.

== Gallery ==
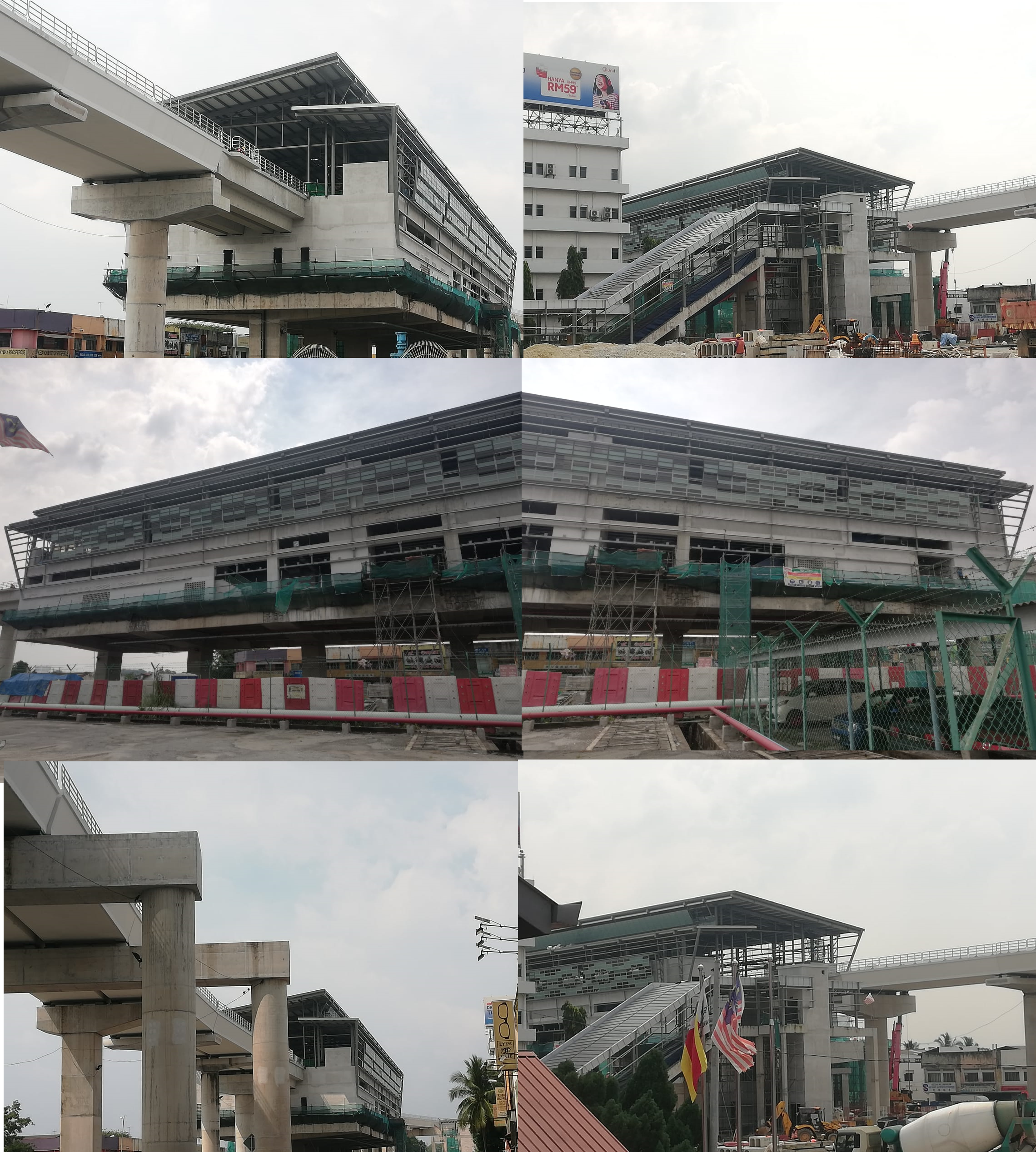
Views of the station under construction in 2021
