= New Klang Valley Expressway =

Road in Malaysia

Expressway 1
- New Klang Valley Expressway; Lebuhraya Baru Lembah Klang 新巴生河流域大道
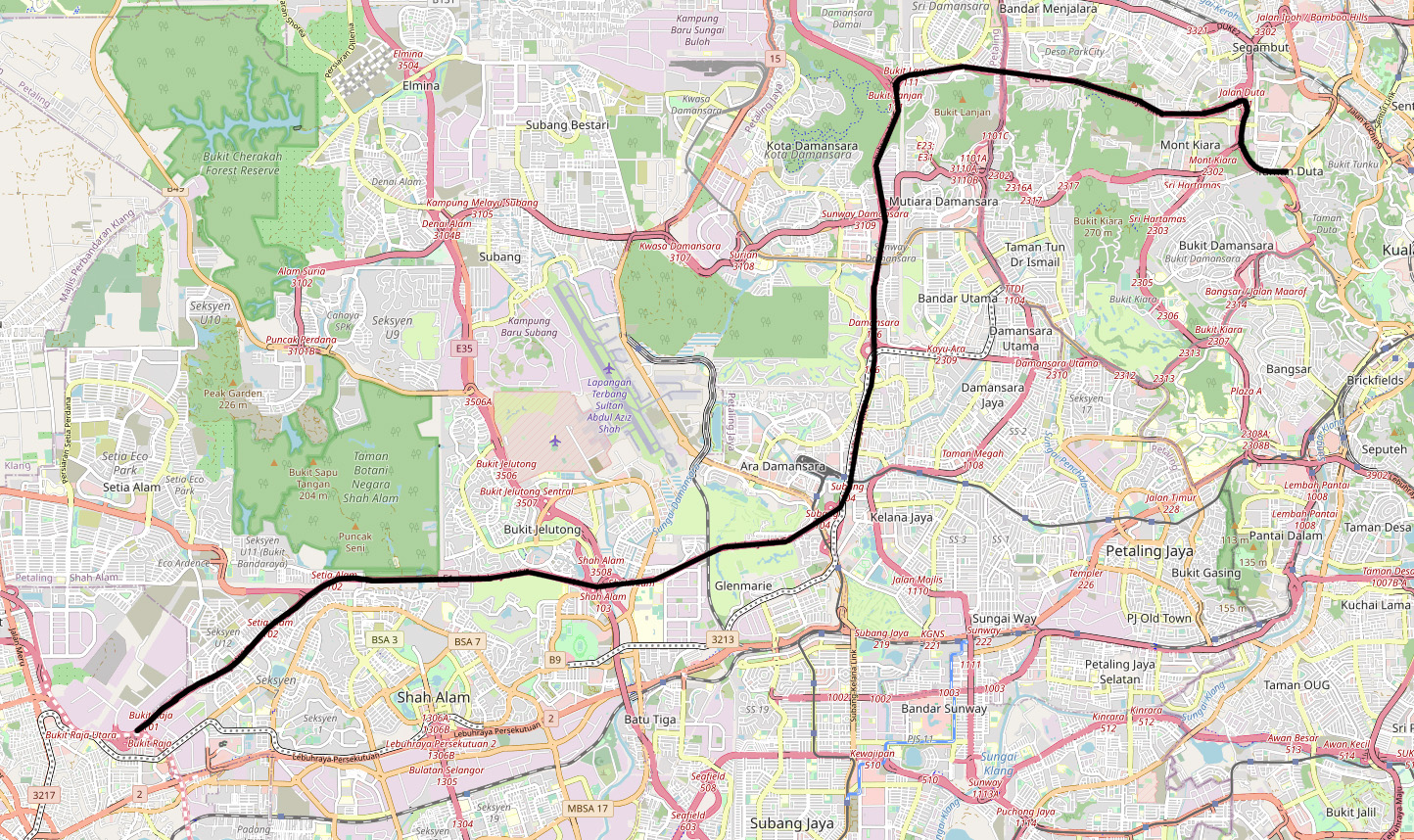

Route information
- Part of AH2 (Bukit Lanjan–Shah Alam) AH141 (Bukit Raja-Jalan Duta (DUKE))
- Maintained by PLUS Expressways
- Length: 35 km (22 mi)
- Existed: 1988–present
- History: Completed in 1993

Major junctions
- Southwest end: New North Klang Straits Bypass / AH141 at Bukit Raja, Selangor

- Guthrie Corridor Expressway; North–South Expressway Central Link / AH2; FT 15 Subang Airport Highway; Sprint Expressway; North–South Expressway Northern Route / AH2 Duta–Ulu Klang Expressway / AH141
- Northeast end: Jalan Tuanku Abdul Halim at Jalan Duta, Kuala Lumpur

Location
- Country: Malaysia
- Primary destinations: Setia Alam, Shah Alam, Bukit Jelutong, Subang, Ara Damansara, Damansara, Kota Damansara, Bukit Lanjan

Highway system
- Highways in Malaysia; Expressways; Federal; State

The New Klang Valley Expressway (Note: The expressway is also sometimes informally referred to as the North Klang Valley Expressway in contrast to the newer South Klang Valley Expressway.) (NKVE), designated E1, is an expressway entirely within the Klang Valley region of Selangor and Kuala Lumpur in Peninsular Malaysia. The expressway begins at the settlement of Bukit Raja near Klang, and ends at Jalan Duta in Kuala Lumpur. The 35-kilometre (22-mile) expressway is one of the most heavily utilised expressways in the Klang Valley region. The expressway shares its designation with the North–South Expressway Northern Route.

== History ==
Plans for the NKVE began in 1985 after the North–South Expressway was constructed and the Federal Highway had become a busing traffic during rush hour between Kuala Lumpur and Klang.

Construction began in 1988, and the first section of the NKVE between Bukit Raja and Damansara opened to traffic on 7 December 1990.

The section between Bukit Lanjan and Jalan Duta was constructed by Pati Sdn Bhd and TAS industries.

The fully completed NKVE spanning between Bukit Raja and Jalan Duta was officially opened by the fourth Prime Minister Mahathir Mohamad at Jalan Duta toll plaza on 11 January 1993.

== Developments ==
=== Fourth lane addition ===
In July 2010, the operator, PLUS Expressways Berhad, announced that the government had awarded contracts to build a fourth lane on a stretch from Shah Alam to Jalan Duta. The construction was completed in 2015.

== Features ==
=== Notable features ===
NKVE is the second link between Kuala Lumpur and Klang after the Federal Highway. It has no rest and service areas, though there are many petrol station laybys situated along the highway. Other features of this highway include traffic CCTVs and VMS. Many viaducts are located along this expressway including the Penchala, Bukit Lanjan and Segambut viaducts. Persada PLUS is the main headquarters of the PLUS Expressways located at Subang Interchange. The expressways also includes spectacular sceneries of Mont Kiara and the Kuala Lumpur skyline.

=== Restricted routes for heavy vehicles ===
A restricted route has been implemented on the New Klang Valley Expressway between Shah Alam and Jalan Duta during workdays or peak hours. Heavy vehicles (except buses and tankers) with laden and unladen heavy vehicles weighing 10,000 kg or more are not allowed to enter the expressway between 6:30 am until 9:30 am on Monday to Friday (except public holidays). A compound fine will be issued to heavy vehicles which flout the rule.

== Incidents ==
=== Rockfall near Bukit Lanjan ===
On 26 November 2003, a rockfall near the Bukit Lanjan interchange caused the expressway to close for more than six months, causing massive traffic jams to occur in areas surrounding Klang Valley. After clearance of debris and road repairs, the expressway was reopened to public by mid-2004.

=== Collapsed beam on NKVE–Setia Alam flyover ===
On 10 July 2005, a section of the Setia Alam flyover interchange – which was under construction then – collapsed, resulting in the deaths of two Bangladeshi workers and injuring seven others. (Source: New Straits Times 21 July 2005)

== Toll rates ==
NKVE applied closed toll system in their entire route, implemented in all their access points where vehicles are charged according to distance travelled. The rates below is for full length journey between Jalan Duta toll plaza and Bukit Raja toll plaza:

Class	Type of vehicles	Rate (in Malaysian Ringgit (RM))
0	Motorcycles	Free
1	Vehicles with 2 axles and 3 or 4 wheels excluding taxis	RM 3.77
2	Vehicles with 2 axles and 5 or 6 wheels excluding buses	RM 6.90
3	Vehicles with 3 or more axles	RM 9.20
4	Taxis	RM 1.89
5	Buses	RM 2.87

Due to their fare integration with most of North-South Expressway parts and ELITE in a single closed toll system (up to system terminus in Sungai Besi, Jalan Duta, Bukit Raja, Juru and Skudai), the rates would be higher depending on their entry point. Passenger passing through this expressway (between Shah Alam and Bukit Lanjan to ELITE and Northern Route respectively) will have their fare includes distance travelled along this section of NKVE as well in their exit points in other expressways, but they not need to pay any tolls in between.

== Interchange and layby lists ==
State/territory	District	Location	km	mi	Exit	Name	Destinations	Notes
Selangor	Klang	Bukit Raja	−1.2	−0.75	101	Bukit Raja interchange	New North Klang Straits Bypass / FT 20 / AH141 – Klang, Port Klang, Meru, Kapar, Shah Alam; Persiaran Waja – Bukit Raja Industrial Estate	
Selangor	Klang	Bukit Raja	−0.5	−0.31	Petronas and Shell layby (westbound)			
Selangor	Klang	Bukit Raja	0.0	0.0	Bukit Raja Toll Plaza			
Selangor	Petaling	Shah Alam	3.0	1.9	102	Setia Alam interchange	Setia Alam Highway – Setia Alam, Meru, Kapar	
Selangor	Petaling	Shah Alam			Sungai Rasau bridge			
Selangor	Petaling	Shah Alam	9.0	5.6	103	Shah Alam interchange	North–South Expressway Central Link / AH2 – Johor Bahru, Malacca, Seremban, Putrajaya, Cyberjaya, Kuala Lumpur International Airport (KLIA); Guthrie Corridor Expressway – Shah Alam, Bukit Jelutong, TTDI Jaya, Denai Alam, Elmina, Kuala Selangor, Rawang, Puncak Alam, Ijok, Ipoh	Western terminus of concurrency with AH2
Selangor	Petaling	Damansara	9.6	6.0	Sungai Damansara bridge			
Selangor	Petaling	Damansara	13.9	8.6	104	Subang interchange	FT 15 Subang Airport Highway – Subang, Sultan Abdul Aziz Shah Airport, Subang Jaya, Kelana Jaya, USJ	Persada PLUS, the PLUS Expressways main headquarters
Selangor	Petaling	Damansara	14.4	8.9	Sungai Kayu Ara bridge			
Selangor	Petaling	Damansara	14.4	8.9	LRT Kelana Jaya Line railway bridge			
Selangor	Petaling	Damansara	15.3	9.5	Petronas and Shell layby (eastbound)			
Selangor	Petaling	Damansara			Sungai Takil bridge			
Selangor	Petaling	Damansara	17.0	10.6	106	Damansara interchange	Sprint Expressway (Damansara Link) – Damansara, Bandar Utama, Mutiara Damansara, Petaling Jaya, Pusat Bandar Damansara, Bangsar, Kuala Lumpur	
Selangor	Petaling	Damansara			Sungai Rumput bridge			
Selangor	Petaling	Damansara			MRT Kajang Line railway bridge			
Selangor	Petaling	Damansara	20.0	12.4	107	Kota Damansara interchange	Persiaran Kenanga – Kota Damansara, Mutiara Damansara, Sunway Damansara, Kwasa Damansara, Bandar Pinggiran Subang	5 lanes eastbound
Selangor	Petaling	Bukit Lanjan	20.9	13.0	108	Bukit Lanjan interchange	North–South Expressway Northern Route / AH2 – Bukit Kayu Hitam, Alor Setar, George Town, Ipoh, Rawang, Sungai Buloh	Eastern terminus of concurrency with AH2
Kuala Lumpur	N/A	Segambut			Penchala viaduct			
Kuala Lumpur	N/A	Segambut			Edinburgh viaduct			
Kuala Lumpur	N/A	Segambut			Segambut Dalam viaduct			
Kuala Lumpur	N/A	Taman Duta			Shell layby (westbound)			
Kuala Lumpur	N/A	Taman Duta	29.0	18.0	Jalan Duta Toll Plaza			
Kuala Lumpur	N/A	Taman Duta			Shell layby (eastbound)			
Kuala Lumpur	N/A	Taman Duta			110	Jalan Duta-DUKE interchange	Duta–Ulu Klang Expressway / AH141 – Kepong, Bandar Sri Damansara, Segambut, Sentul, Batu Caves, Ampang, Hulu Kelang, Gombak, Kuantan, Genting Highlands	Eastern terminus of concurrency with AH141
Kuala Lumpur	N/A	Taman Duta	29.7	18.5	112	Jalan Duta-Sprint interchange	Sprint Expressway (Penchala Link) – Mont Kiara, Sri Hartamas, Bukit Damansara, Damansara, Petaling Jaya	
Kuala Lumpur	N/A	Taman Duta	31.0	19.3	111	Jalan Duta interchange	Jalan Duta – Kuala Lumpur city centre, Segambut, Kuantan	
1.000 mi = 1.609 km; 1.000 km = 0.621 mi: Concurrency terminus; Electronic toll collection
