= Shah Alam City Council =

Local authority for Shah Alam City, Malaysia

Shah Alam City Council Majlis Bandaraya Shah Alam
- Emblem

Type
- Type: City council of Shah Alam

History
- Founded: 7 December 1978; 47 years ago
- Preceded by: Shah Alam Municipal Council

Leadership
- Mayor: Mohd Fauzi Haji Mohd Yatim since 4 June 2024
- Secretary: Mohd Rashidi bin Ruslan since 7 January 2019

Structure
- Seats: 24
- Political groups: Councillors: PKR (10); DAP (7); AMANAH (6); Orang Besar (1)
- Length of term: 2024-2025

Motto
- Beautiful, Brilliant （Indah Bestari）

Meeting place
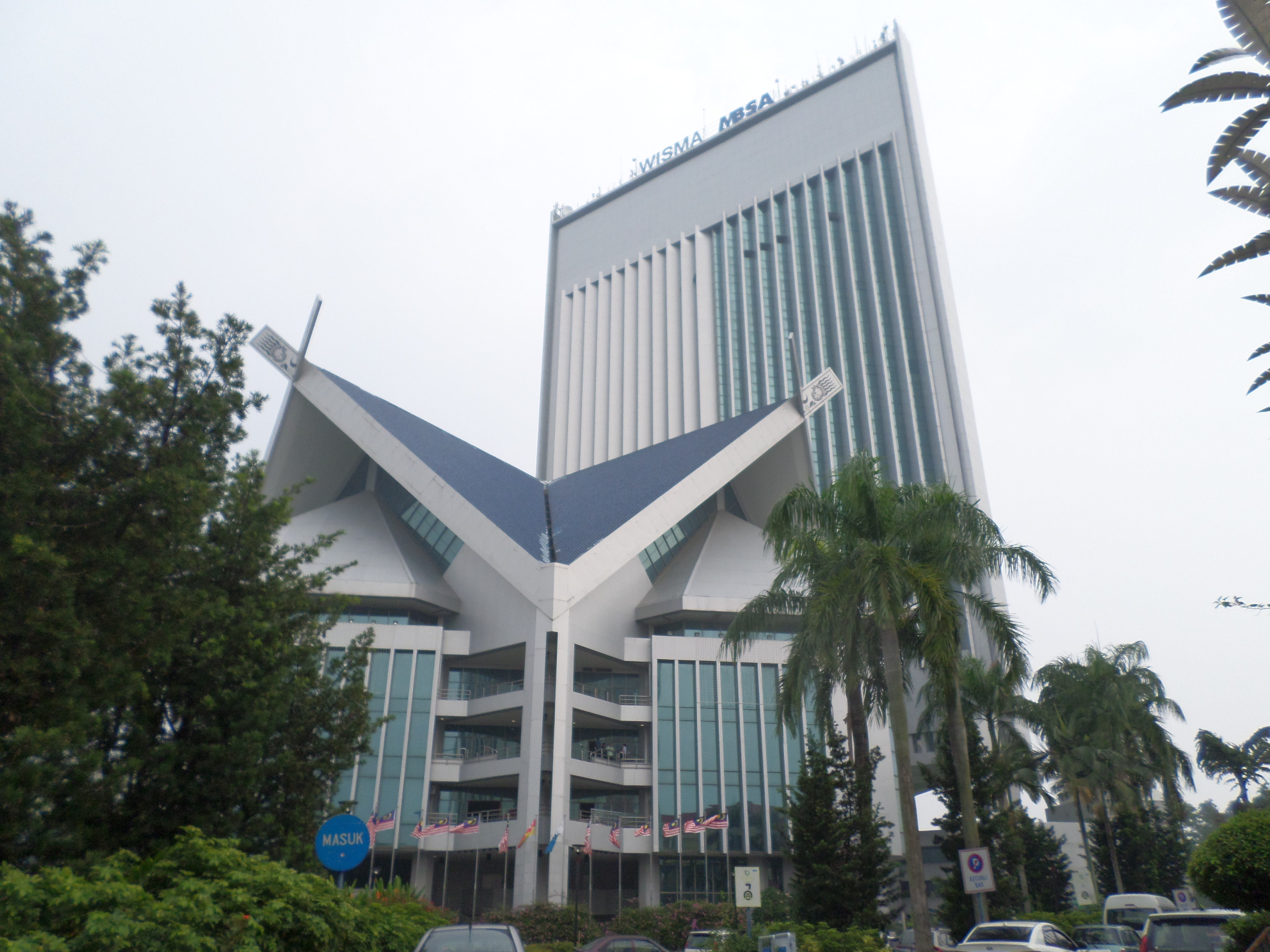
- Wisma MBSA; Persiaran Perbandaran, 40000 Shah Alam, Selangor, Malaysia; 3.07346°N 101.52015°E

Website
- www.mbsa.gov.my

Constitution
- Local Government Act 1976

Administrative areas of Shah Alam City Council

Shah Alam City Council (MBSA; Malay: Majlis Bandaraya Shah Alam) is the city council for Shah Alam City, Malaysia, north of Petaling District and east of Klang District, and an agency under the Selangor state government. MBSA is responsible for public health, sanitation, waste removal and management, town planning, environmental protection and building control, social and economic development and general maintenance functions of urban infrastructure. The MBSA main headquarters is located at Persiaran Perbandaran, Shah Alam.

== History ==
When Shah Alam was developed as a township in 1963, the Shah Alam Town Board was founded under the Perbadanan Kemajuan Negeri Selangor or Selangor State Development Corporation (PKNS). The Town Board was then made Majlis Perbandaran Shah Alam (MPSA) or the Shah Alam Municipal Council when Shah Alam is declared the state capital of Selangor on 7 December 1978. The state secretary of Selangor at the time was chosen to be the head of the council or the Yang di-Pertua. The municipal council was based in a shophouse in Section 3 with an operational staff of 123, and began operations on 1 January 1979. The council then relocates to the Kompleks PKNS at Section 14 in 1981, and subsequently to its own building, the 28-storey Wisma MPSA in 1988. With the granting of city status in 2000, the council is upgraded into the Shah Alam City Council or known as Majlis Bandaraya Shah Alam (MBSA).

=== Mayor ===
List of the Mayors of Shah Alam :

No	Mayor	Term start	Term end
1.	Abu Sujak Mahmud	10 October 2000	2002
2.	Salamon Selamat	2002	2004
3.	Ramli Mahmud	2004	2006
4.	Ramlan Othman	2006	2008
5.	Mazalan Md Noor	2008	2011
6.	Mohd Jaafar Mohd Atan	2012	2015
7.	Ahmad Zaharin Mohd Saad	2015	2018
8.	Haris Kasim	2018	13 June 2021
9.	Zamani Ahmad Mansor	14 June 2021	8 October 2022
10.	Nor Fuad Abdul Hamid	1 December 2022	27 October 2023
11.	Cheremi Tarman	Acting: 27 October 2023	3 June 2024
12.	Mohd Fauzi Mohd Yatim	4 June 2024	present

=== Councillors ===
The 24 councillors of the Shah Alam City Council for session 2023 are as follows:

Zone No.	Member	Party
PKR 10 | DAP 7 | AMANAH 6 | Orang Besar Petaling 1
2	Emran Kadir	Orang Besar Petaling
24	Zulnizam Shahrani	PKR
18	Mohd Shazrizat Zulkipli	PKR
19	Tengku Ahmad Bin Tengku Kasim	PKR
16	Murugiah Munusamy	PKR
13	Muhammad Izuan Ahmad Kasim	PKR
10	Saribanon Saibon	PKR
5	Nur Yusmi Md Yusop	PKR
6	Hamdan Harun	PKR
15	Siti Anum Tawil	PKR
1	Suryamuizzudin Kamarudin	PKR
9	Ramu Nadarajan	DAP
14	Papparaidu Veraman	DAP
20	Ghandimathi Suppiah	DAP
21	Siow Fun Yean	DAP
22	Muhammad Shakir Ameer Mohideen	DAP
17	Ooi Haw Voon	DAP
12	Kong Sai Weng	DAP
23	Mariam Abdul Rashid	AMANAH
7	Mohamad Jamil Abdul Rahim	AMANAH
11	Muhammad Nabil Norhalim	AMANAH
4	Halim Mohamed Redzuan	AMANAH
3	Mohd Firdaus Mokhtar	AMANAH
8	Siti Nur Aishah Mohd Zain	AMANAH

== Departments ==
1. Jabatan Bangunan (Building Department)
2. Jabatan Kewangan (Monetary Department)
3. Jabatan Perancangan (Planning Department)
4. Jabatan Kejuruteraan (Engineering Department)
5. Jabatan Penilaian dan Pengurusan Harta (Valuation and Property Management Department)
6. Jabatan Perlesenan (Licensing Department)
7. Jabatan Pengurusan Sisa Pepejal dan Pembersihan Awam (Solid Waste Management and Public Cleansing Department)
8. Jabatan Khidmat Pengurusan (Service Management Department)
9. Jabatan Lanskap (Landscape Department)
10. Jabatan Penguatkuasaan (Enforcement Department)
11. Bahagian Pusat Setempat (One Stop Center Unit)
12. Bahagian Perundangan (Legal Unit)
13. Bahagian Audit dalam dan Pengaduan Awam
14. Bahagian Korporat dan Pembangunan Masyarakat (Corporate and Community Development Unit)
15. Bahagian Pengurusan Stadium (Stadium Management Unit)
16. Bahagian Tender dan Ukur Bahan (Tender and Quantity Survey Unit)
17. Bahagian Teknologi Maklumat dan Komunkasi (Information Technology (IT) and Communication Unit)

== Branch office ==
There are 3 branch offices, one at Sungai Buloh branch office, off Bukit Rahman Putra, and another 2 at Kota Kemuning and Setia Alam.

== Awards ==
- 2013- Malaysia's Sustainable City Award

== Past Members ==
2018-2020 Session, 23 councillors as below:

Councillor	Political Affiliation
Bismi Zulhadi Mohd Nor	BERSATU
Emran Kadir	Orang Besar Petaling
Danial Al-Rashid bin Haron Aminar Rashid	AMANAH
Anizan Othman	PKR
Dr. Siti Sarah Izham	AMANAH
vacant	PKR
Afzainizam A.Rahman	PKR
Mohd Jamil Abdul Rahim	AMANAH
Rozaina Hamzih	PKR
Yugarajah Palanisamy	DAP
Ismail Zakaria	AMANAH
Kamarudzaman Sanusi	PKR
Papparaidu Veramam	DAP
Helmi Hanip	PKR
Mohd Azlan Shah Mohd Arshad	BERSATU
Ghandimathi Suppiah	DAP
Abdul Manaff Yusof	PKR
Ooi Haw Voon	DAP
Wan Dzahanurin Ahmad	BERSATU
Siou Fun Yean	DAP
Mariam Abdul Rashid	AMANAH
Muhammad Shakir Ameer Mohideen	DAP
Zulnizam Shahrani	PKR
