= Setia City Mall =

Shopping Mall in Shah Alam

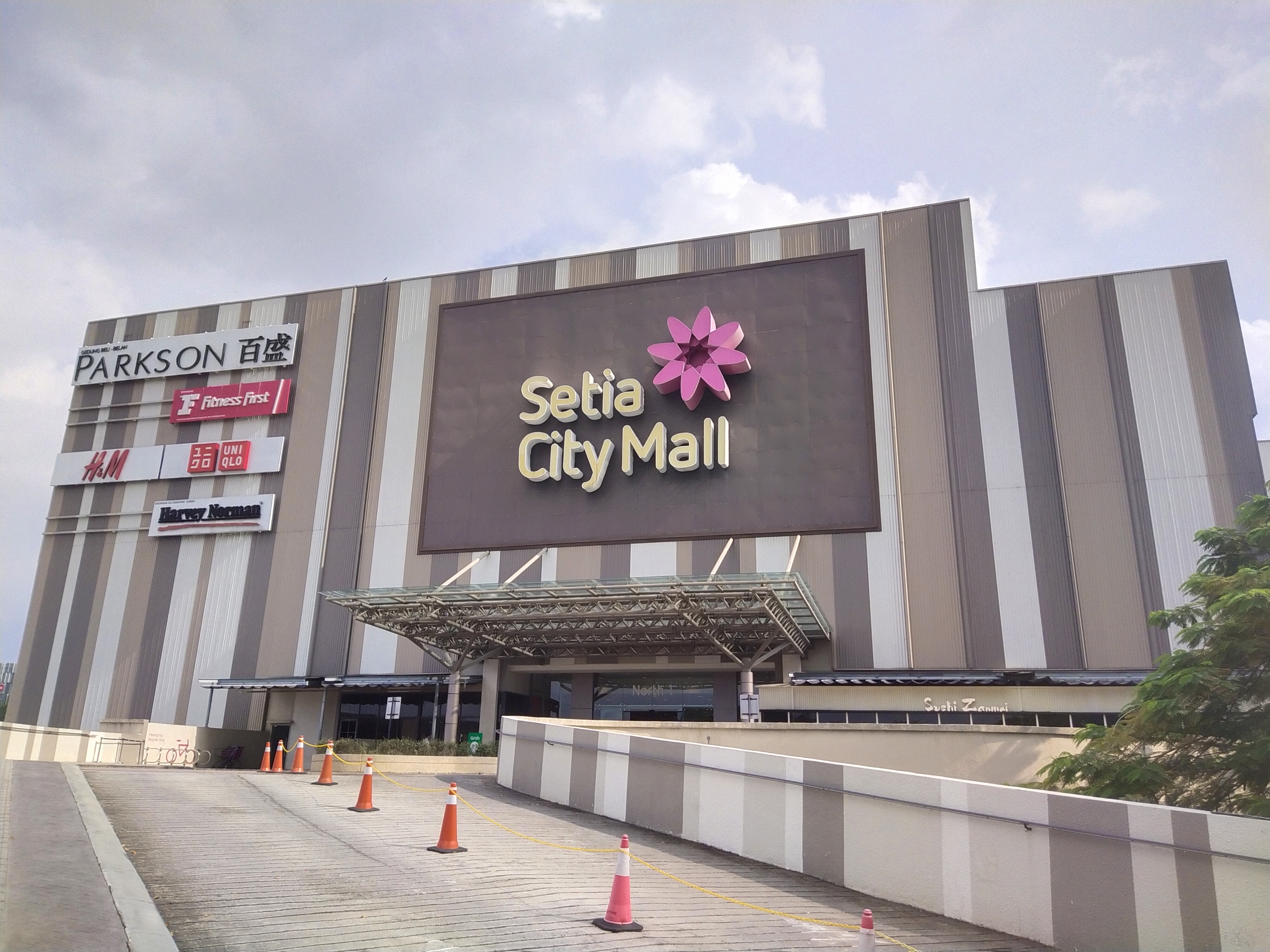
- Location: Setia Alam, Selangor
- Coordinates: 3.1094806°N 101.4596168°E
- Address: 7, Persiaran Setia Dagang, Bandar Setia Alam, Seksyen U13, 40170 Shah Alam, Selangor
- Opened: 30 September 2011; 15 years ago (Phase 1); 1 April 2021; 5 years ago (Phase 2)
- Developer: SP Setia; Lendlease
- Manager: Greenhill Resources Sdn. Bhd.
- Architect: Archicentre Sdn. Bhd.
- Num. of stores: 327
- Floor area: 1,180,000 sq ft (110,000 m^{2})
- Floors: 4
- Website: setiacitymall.com

Setia City Mall is a shopping mall in Setia Alam, Selangor. The mall was developed by SP Setia Berhad and Lendlease as a joint venture.

== History ==
It began construction in January 2011 by SP Setia and Lendlease's Asian Retail Investment Fund (ARIF). Then it opened in May 2011. It also became popular and it's the biggest mall in Shah Alam. In 2019, the mall began expansion and opened entirely to visitors in March 2021.

Setia City Mall's East Entrance

== Features ==
=== Setia City Park ===
Setia City Park is a 10.5 acre park. It is also close to the mall and has a playground.

=== Golden Screen Cinemas ===
This branch has 9 halls, 1,570 seats and has Dolby ATMOS.

== The Tenants ==
- AEON (Formerly Lulu Hypermarket)
- Urbanfresh
- Golden Screen Cinemas
- Harvey Norman
- Parkson
- Fitness First
- MR.DIY
- Toy World

== Transportation ==
=== Car ===
It's accessed by Persiaran Setia Dagang, Jalan Setia Dagang AH U13/AH and Setia Alam Highway.

=== Bus ===
It has 3 bus routes serving the mall: 753 where it goes from Shah Alam to UiTM Puncak Alam, BK02 (SU13A) where Setia City Mall is served here and is a loop route around Setia Alam and T728 where it is a feeder bus heading from Pasar Klang LRT station and Setia City Mall is served here.

== Incidents ==
=== 2025 shooting ===
On 8 February 2025, a shooting incident occurred at the mall on 10.50pm. A gunman fired at least 8 shots in the shopping mall, 4 shots of which hit a janitor, injuring his legs and buttocks.

The janitor managed to flee into the shopping mall to seek help, while the suspect escaped to Level P2 all the way to the mall. The suspect then fired several shots at a staircase window and a sliding door on Level P2 before moving to the carpark area. In the carpark area, the gunman hijacked a Perodua Ativa carrying a family of six at gunpoint, and forced the driver to drive him out of the mall. The suspect then dropped off from the SUV at the Pandamaran exit of KESAS Highway and continue his escape on foot.

The shooting caused mass panic inside the shopping mall, while individual stores in the mall rolled down their shutters to shelter in place. Emergency evacuation announcement was also heard broadcasting through the shopping mall's PA system.

In the next 10 days, the gunman would committed a series of "GTA-style crime spree" such as carjacking, robbery, firearm offences in Klang, Melaka, Banting, Sekinchan, and Sabak, before fleeing to Pulau Ketam and checked into a hotel on the island.

On 18 February 2025, at around 3:00 in the morning, CID officers from Bukit Aman and Selangor police raided the hotel, resulting in a shootout with the gunman. The gunman was then shot dead in his hotel room. Two pistol with bullets were found. The gunman was later identified as Yap Chin Boon, nicknamed "Ah Boy", 35, a Malaysian Chinese, who had numerous criminal records such as robbery and drug-related crimes since 2014.

== See also ==
- The Exchange TRX
- List of shopping malls in Malaysia
