= Klang High School =

- SMK Tinggi Klang 巴生高等中学; Bā Shēng Gāo Děng Zhong Xué கிள்ளான் உயர்நிலை பள்ளி

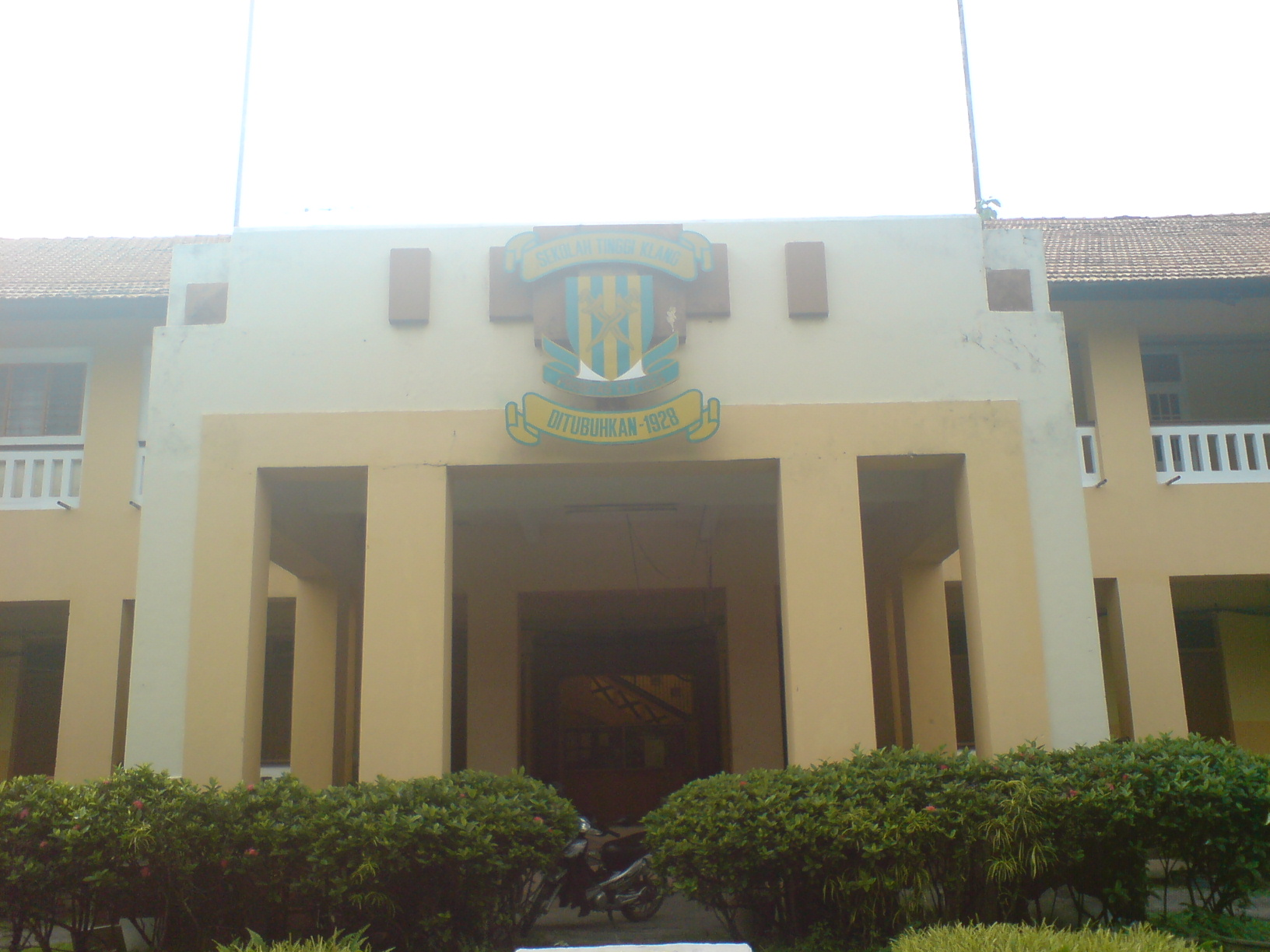
- The main building of High School Klang.
- Jalan Meru, 41050 Klang, Selangor; Malaysia

Information
- Other names: The High School Klang, HSK, STK
- Type: National secondary school, former British government school
- Motto: Probitas Et Fides (Loyalty and Integrity)
- Established: 1928
- Session: Double
- Grades: Form 1 - Form 6
- Enrollment: 1,300 (approx.)
- Language: English, Bahasa Melayu, Mandarin Chinese, Tamil
- Colours: Green, Yellow, White
- Yearbook: Semarak
- Website: www.stk.edu.my

Klang High School or classically known as the High School Klang (Abbreviation: HSK or STK; Bahasa Malaysia: SMK Tinggi Klang; simplified Chinese: 巴生高等中学; pinyin: Bā Shēng Gāo Děng Zhong Xué, Tamil: கிள்ளான் உயர்நிலை பள்ளி) is a Malaysian national secondary school located at Jalan Meru about one km away from the Klang city centre in Selangor, Malaysia. It is situated beside the Klang District Education Office. It is a male-only school from Form 1 to Form 5. At the Sixth Form level, where students take their STPM, the classes have both male and female. Klang High School was one of the top-performing schools in Selangor during the British governance and until today, it is still among the respected schools in Selangor. Since its establishment, the school has produced numerous talents serving for the nation and overseas.

== History ==
Klang High School was originally named Temporary English School and was open to students in Klang on 14 January 1928 with the beginning of the academic school year. At the beginning, the school conducted the class in a small hut at the current sports field of the school. English was taught to a small multi-cultural group of junior high school students.

The British government could feel the need of English education for this local community in Klang. Thus, after gaining approval from the British central government in Malaya, the school was given better facilities by the British government, particularly the buildings currently named "Block A" and "Block B". The main school block (Block A) was officiated by the Sultan of Selangor on 20 March 1930.

During the World War II, the small school struggled to remain open on a regular basis and in 1941, it was used by the British as the headquarters of the Medical Auxiliary Service for Klang. There were two doctors assisted by 52 nurses. However, the school went into ruin when the Japanese army invaded Klang. Innocent civilians serving the school were killed by the Japanese army and the school's facilities were damaged during the war. During the Japanese invasion, the school was used as a military base and also as medical camp. The school reopened after World War II having been used as a military hospital by the British Military Authority and the Japanese army.

After Malaysia's independence in 1957, it was known as Sekolah Tinggi Klang or by its acronym STK. By the end of the 1990s, the name was changed in accordance with Ministry of Education regulations to its current name, SMK Tinggi Klang.

== Principals ==
- S.C.E. Singam (1928–1929)
- T. Mailvahanan (1929-1930)
- H.V. Ponniah (1930-1931)
- E.C. Hicks (1931-1932)
- D. Roper (1932-1934)
- P.F. Howitt (1934-1936)
- H.R. Carey (1936-1937)
- E.R. Davies (1937-1939)
- C.W Bloomfield (1939-1940)
- E.F. Pearson (1940-1945)
- V.K. Chinniah (1945-1946)
- C.W. Jackman (1946-1947)
- M. Campbell (1947-1948)
- T.K. Taylor (1948-1950)
- W. Burton (1950-1951)
- K. Arianayagam (1951–1953)
- F.J. Rawcliffe (1953-1955)
- A. Williamson (1955-1957)
- J.M.B. Hughes (1957–1958)
- C. Stowe (1958-1959)
- R.A. Wilson (1959-1960)
- Chye Kooi Ngan (1960-1962)
- S.K. Nayagam (1962-1963)
- Lee Mun Yui (1963- April 1963)
- Wahidullah Khan (April 1963 - 1969)
- Austin Hooi (1969–1970)
- Victor Gopal (1970–1973)
- Foong See Tonn (1973–1982)
- Tn. Haji Zorkarnain Abdul Rahman (June 1982 – 1985)
- Tn. Haji Abdul Raof Hussin (1985–1988)
- Tn. Haji Kamaruddin Mansur (February 1988 – 1994)
- Dr. Abdul Karim Md. Nor (1994-1996)
- Tn. Haji Any Sujak (1996–1998)
- Tn. Haji Salihuddin Mohd. Said (1998–2001)
- Puan Hajah Siti Aishah Abdullah (2001–2005)
- Puan Hajah Sriyati Abdul Manan (2005–2010)
- Tn. Haji Najib B Ayub (2010)
- Puan Hajah Huzaimah (2010-2012)
- Puan Hajah Laila Ibrahim (2012-2014)
- YM Hajah Raja Rozita Raja Hanafi (2014-2020)
- Tn. Haji Abdul Hakim Samuri (2020-2023)
- Tn. Haji Hijazi Bin Mohamad Harawi (2023-2024)
- Al-Irwan Bin Saihiboll Rahim (2025-current)
