= Kapar =

Town in Klang District, Selangor, Malaysia

Coordinates: 3°08′N 101°23′E

Kapar in Klang District

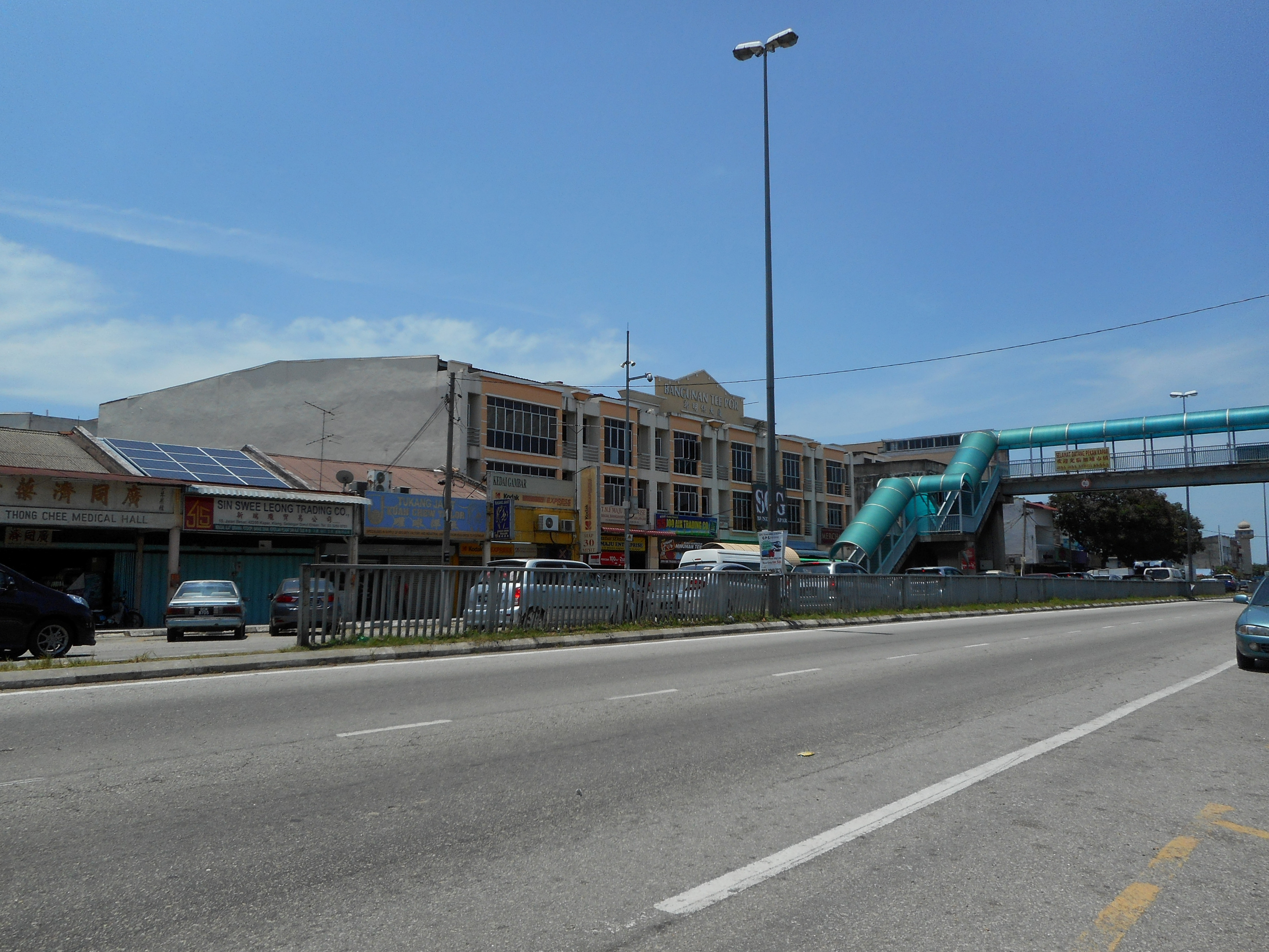
Kapar

Kapar (Chinese: 加埔) is a town in Klang District, Selangor, Malaysia. It is 17 km (≈11 miles) from Klang city via federal route 5.

The Sultan Salahuddin Abdul Aziz Power Station is located not far from the town. The Kapar River which flows nearby the town centre empties into the Straits of Malacca.

== Etymology ==
According to linguist Asmah Haji Omar, the name Kapar originated from the name of the Kampar kabupaten in Sumatra, Indonesia. According to her, it is also related to the name of the town Kampar found in the state of Perak, and also to the Iban expression urang kampar which refers to a "foreigner" or "outsider".
