= Bukit Raja =

Human settlement in Malaysia

Coordinates: 3°05′11.0″N 101°25′59.9″E

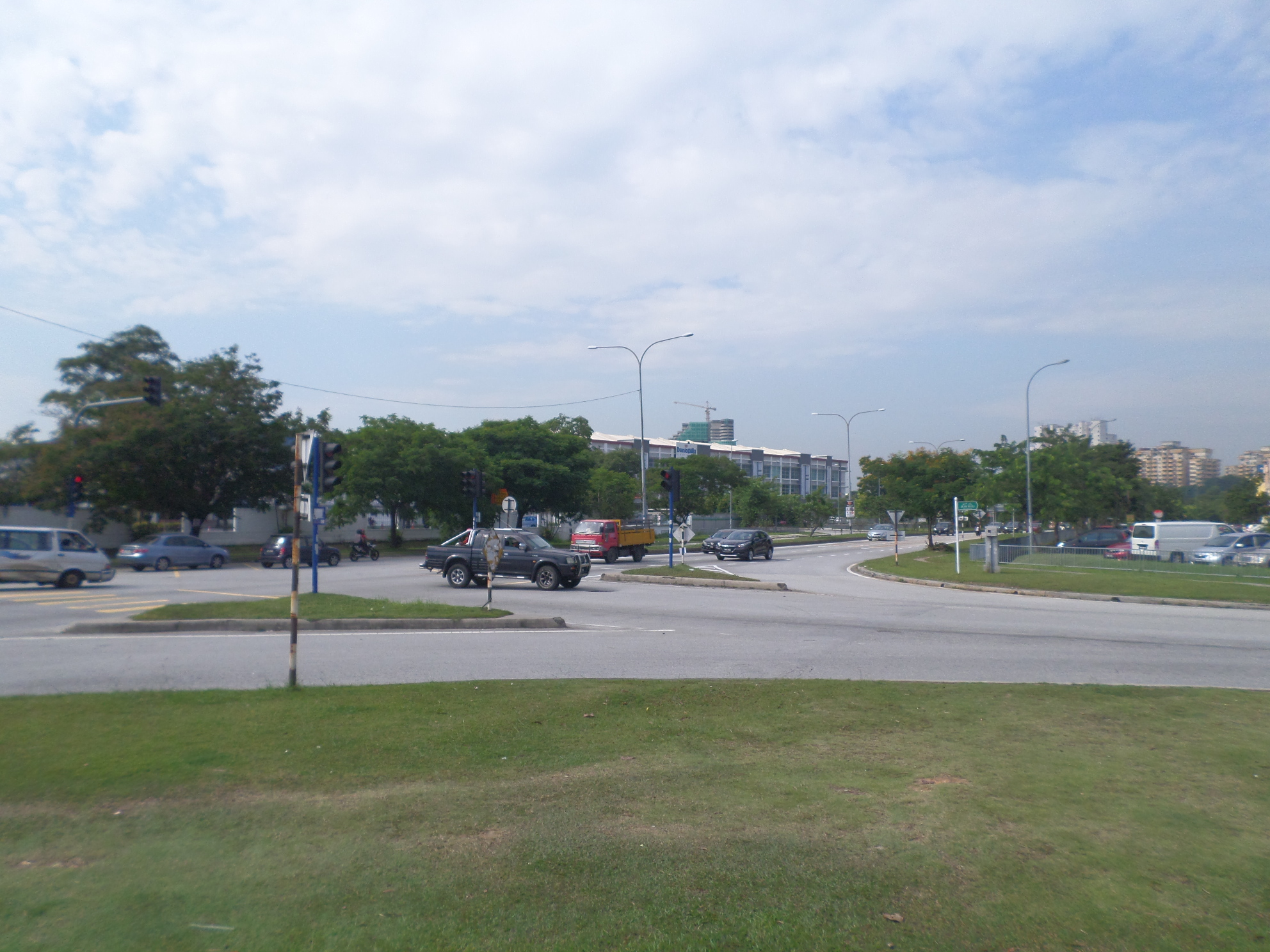
Bukit Raja Selatan Industrial Area, Shah Alam, Petaling, Selangor, Malaysia

Bukit Raja in Petaling District

Bukit Raja (Jawi: بوكيت راج) can be referred a mukim in Petaling District, Selangor, Malaysia, that contains several areas in northern Shah Alam which are western part of Section 7 of Shah Alam, Setia Alam (U13), Denai Alam, Bukit Subang, Alam Budiman, Puncak Perdana, Bukit Bandaraya (U11) and National Botanic Gardens Shah Alam. However, definition of Bukit Raja nowadays has shifted south away, which commonly refer to several areas in Klang, that consists of some former oil palm plantation owned by Sime Derby Plantations. The first development of Bukit Raja estate was an industrial area around Bandar Baru Klang and Federal Highway, subsequently Bukit Raja has expanded to the border of Setia Alam with new establishment of “Bandar Bukit Raja” housing project.

The main developer is Sime Darby Property, and total covers 4,405 acres of freehold land, first phase of Bandar Bukit Raja was launched in 2002 and has since delivered a diverse mix of residential projects comprising affordable, medium and luxurious houses as well as commercial centers.

As of 2020, the township has expanded till Jalan Sungai Puloh and will further develop north till Kapar interchange (alternatively named as Bandar Bukit Raja North interchange) of West Coast Expressway (WCE). Almost half of the township will be used as industrial lands.

The former Bukit Rajah estate had a convenience store, temple Tamil primary school, a football field as well as a badminton court for the workers and staff. The labourers lived in accommodation referred to as "the lines".

Companies in the Bukit industrial area include Malaysian industrial gas supplier Mox-Linde Gases Sdn. Bhd. and Amsteel and a TOYOTA manufacturing plant. Columbia Asia Hospital Klang also located in Bukit Raja, Klang.

UMW Toyota Motor had built a new assembly factory at Bukit Raja. The plant assembles Toyota vehicles such as the Vios, Yaris and the Corolla Cross. The 670,000 square metres new plant is part of Toyota's plans to reorganize its production system in Malaysia. Construction of the new plant, which is 10 km away from the current ASSB plant in Shah Alam and near to Port Klang.
