= Klang District =

- Daerah Klang
- Interactive map of Klang District
- Coordinates: 3°05′N 101°25′E
- Country: Malaysia
- State: Selangor
- Seat: Klang
- Local area government(s): Klang Royal City Council (West); Shah Alam City Council (East)

Government
  - District officer: Zainal Nor
  - Sultan's Representative: Abdul Ghani Pateh Akhir

Area
  - Total: 626.78 km^{2} (242.00 sq mi)

Population (2010)
  - Total: 861,189
- Postcode: 40xxx-42xxx
- Calling code: +6-03-3, +6-03-51
- Vehicle registration: B

The Klang District is a district in Selangor, Malaysia. It is located in the western part of Selangor. It borders the Kuala Selangor District to the north, Petaling to the east, Kuala Langat district to the south and Malacca Straits to the west. The district was further divided into two mukims which is Klang and Kapar that covers 626.78 square km of land with 53.75 km of coastline.

The district's principal town is Klang City. Other towns in the district include Port Klang, Pandamaran, Kapar and Meru and Bandar Sultan Sulaiman.

The Klang River flows through the Klang district and end near Port Klang and it has many islands such as Klang, Indah, Chet Mat Zin, Ketam, Tengah, Rusa, Selat Kering and Pintu Gedong Island.

== Administrative divisions ==

Klang District is divided into 2 mukims, which are Kapar and Klang: Kapar is the areas north of Klang River (Kapar itself is also the name of a town), while Klang covers the area south of the river. Klang city itself includes areas both north and south of the river.

Subsections of Klang Municipal Council that reflects into the suffix of the street names

Kapar (Klang Utara)

- KU 1 - City Centre, Bandar Baru Klang
- KU 2 - Bandar Bukit Raja East
- KU 3 - Batu Belah
- KU 4 - Rantau Panjang
- KU 5 - Bandar Bukit Raja West, Aman Perdana
- KU 6 - Taman Klang Utama
- KU 7 - Sungai Kapar Indah
- KU 8 - Meru South
- KU 9 - Taman Perindustrian Meru
- KU 10 - Meru North
- KU 11 – Kampung Bukit Kapar
- KU 12 - Acob
- KU 13 - Kapar
- KU 14 - Sungai Serdang
- KU 15 - Perepat
- KU 16 - Sementa
- KU 17 - Bandar Sultan Suleiman
- KU 18 - Northport

Klang (Klang Selatan)

- KS 1 – Teluk Pulai
- KS 2 - Taman Sri Andalas, Kampung Jawa
- KS 3 - Sungai Udang
- KS 4 - Port Klang
- KS 5 - Pandamaran
- KS 6 - Bandar Bukit Tinggi
- KS 7 - Taman Sentosa
- KS 8 - Johan Setia
- KS 9 - Bandar Parklands, Sijangkang Sempadan
- KS 10 – Teluk Gong
- KS 11 – Bandar Armada Putra
- KS 12 - Westport / Port Klang Free Zone
- KS 13 - Kampung Sungai Pinang (Indah Island)
- Selat Klang - Ketam Island

=== Government ===
2 local government jurisdictions of Klang District, red is Klang, and white is Shah Alam.

Klang Royal City Council

The Klang Royal City Council (MBDK) governs most parts of the Klang District such as Klang (city), Port Klang, Kapar, Rantau Panjang, Meru, Bandar Botanic, Bandar Bukit Tinggi, Taman Sentosa Perdana, Taman Sri Andalas, Taman Bayu Perdana, Taman Sentosa, Glenmarie Cove, Kota Bayuemas, Berkeley Garden, Taman Eng Ann, Taman Klang Utama, Bandar Baru Klang, Bandar Bukit Raja, Telok Gong, Pulau Indah, Pulau Ketam, Pandamaran, and Bandar Sultan Sulaiman.

Shah Alam City Council

The Shah Alam City Council (MBSA) governs the city centre of Shah Alam. Besides, it also exercises jurisdiction over some parts of the south of Klang District (Kota Kemuning, Sri Muda, & Bukit Rimau), Bukit Raja, Setia Alam, Subang and Sungai Buloh area.

== History ==
In addition to its present-day territory, Klang district before 1974 also included the mukims (communes or sub-districts) of Bukit Raja and Damansara, which covered what is today Shah Alam, Subang Jaya, Bandar Sunway and Kelana Jaya. In 1974, after Kuala Lumpur was made a Federal Territory, the subdistricts of Damansara and Bukit Raja joined with Petaling Jaya, Puchong and Sungai Buloh to form the Petaling District.

== Demographics ==
In 1980, the census figures for the three main ethnic groups in the Klang District were: Malays 105,195, Chinese 119,186, and Indians 54,159. The following are the 2010 census figures for Klang District, which include the city of Klang, Port Klang and part of Shah Alam.

Historical population
Year	Pop.	±%
1970	233,524	—
1980	279,349	+19.6%
1991	406,994	+45.7%
2000	643,436	+58.1%
2010	842,146	+30.9%
2020	1,088,942	+29.3%
Data includes parts of Petaling District before 1974. Source: Department of Statistics Malaysia

== Federal Parliament and State Assembly Seats ==
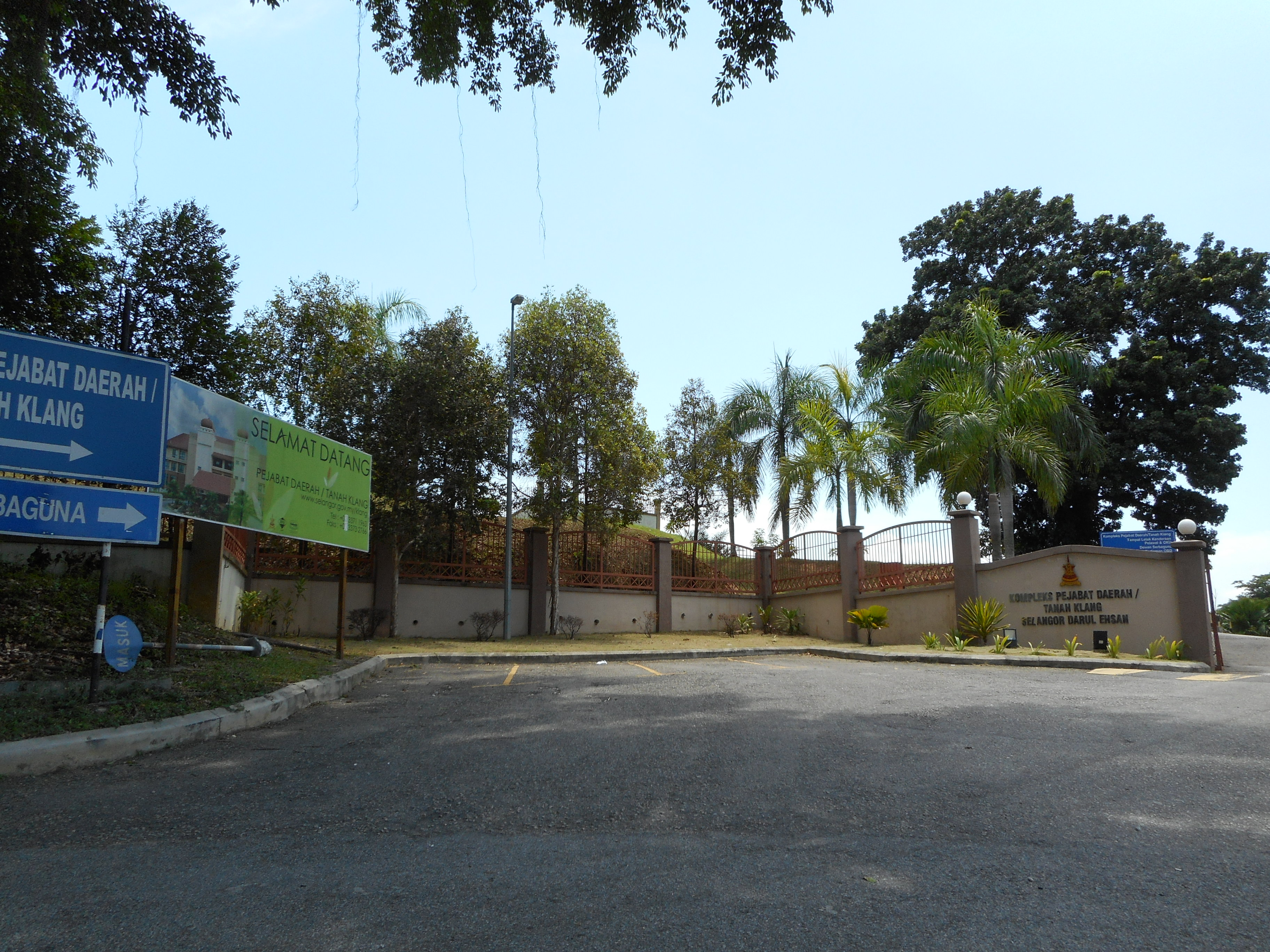
Klang District and Land Office

List of Klang district representatives in the Federal Parliament (Dewan Rakyat)

Parliament	Seat Name	Member of Parliament	Party
P108	Shah Alam	Azli Yusof	Pakatan Harapan (AMANAH)
P109	Kapar	Halimah Ali	Perikatan Nasional (PAS)
P110	Klang	Ganabatirau Veraman	Pakatan Harapan (DAP)
P111	Kota Raja	Mohamad Sabu	Pakatan Harapan (AMANAH)

List of Klang district representatives in the State Legislative Assembly of Selangor

Parliament	State	Seat Name	State Assemblyman	Party
P108	N40	Kota Anggerik	Najwan Halimi	Pakatan Harapan (PKR)
P108	N41	Batu Tiga	Danial Al Rashid	Pakatan Harapan (AMANAH)
P109	N42	Meru	Mariam Abdul Rashid	Pakatan Harapan (AMANAH)
P109	N43	Sementa	Noor Najhan Mohamad Salleh	Perikatan Nasional (PAS)
P109	N44	Selat Klang	Abdul Rashid Asari	Perikatan Nasional (BERSATU)
P110	N45	Bandar Baru Klang	Quah Perng Fei	Pakatan Harapan (DAP)
P110	N46	Pelabuhan Klang	Azmizam Zaman Huri	Pakatan Harapan (PKR)
P110	N47	Pandamaran	Leong Tuck Chee	Pakatan Harapan (DAP)
P111	N48	Sentosa	Gunarajah a/l R George	Pakatan Harapan (PKR)
P111	N49	Sungai Kandis	Wan Dzahanurin Ahmad	Perikatan Nasional (BERSATU)
P111	N50	Kota Kemuning	Preakas Sampunathan	Pakatan Harapan (DAP)

== See also ==
- Districts of Malaysia
