= Petaling District =

- District of Selangor
- Daerah Petaling
- Location of Petaling District in Selangor
- Interactive map of Petaling District
- Location of Petaling District in Malaysia
- Coordinates: 3°05′N 101°35′E
- Country: Malaysia
- State: Selangor
- Seat: Shah Alam
- Local area government(s): Petaling Jaya City Council (East); Shah Alam City Council (West); Subang Jaya City Council (South)

Government
  - District officer: Misri Idris
  - Sultan's Representative: Emran Kadir

Area
  - Total: 484.32 km^{2} (187.00 sq mi)

Population (2020)
  - Total: 2,298,123
  - Density: 4,745.1/km^{2} (12,290/sq mi)
- Time zone: UTC+8 (MST)
  - Summer (DST): UTC+8 (Not observed)
- Postcode: 40xxx, 43xxx, 46xxx, 47xxx, 522xx
- Calling code: +6-03-5, +6-03-6, +6-03-7, +6-03-8
- Vehicle registration plates: B

The Petaling District is a district located in the heart of Selangor in Malaysia. Petaling is not to be confused with the city of Petaling Jaya located in it, nor the mukim of Petaling under Subang Jaya City. The district office is located in Subang.

The district of Petaling was established on 1 February 1974, the same day Kuala Lumpur was declared a Federal Territory. This district is located in the middle of the Klang Valley adjacent to the capital and thus has experienced tremendous urbanisation. Some of the original forests remain in the Bukit Cherakah Forest Reserve (including the National Botanic Gardens), Kota Damansara Community Forest Park and Bukit Gasing. During the 1991 census, it recorded 633,165 people.

The official 2010 census recorded the population of Petaling as 1,660,869 people, excluding foreigners. Petaling is 484.32 km^{2} in area. The urban centres are divided into the cities of Shah Alam, Petaling Jaya and Subang Jaya. However, there are numerous town subdivisions, old subdistrict administrations (mukim), all of which share the same names like Damansara, Subang, and Petaling, which add much to the administrative confusion along with the rapid growth of the district. Five types of subdivisions exist for the Petaling District, namely the city councils (Malay: majlis bandaraya), the council subdivisions, the townships and neighbourhoods, electoral constituencies, and the former district subdivisions ("mukim").

It is home to many thriving townships such as the Damansara area, which hosts several shopping malls including a Tesco and an IKEA outlet. The Sultan Abdul Aziz Shah Airport is situated in Subang.

== Population ==
Historical population
Year	Pop.	±%
1991	633,165	—
2000	1,184,180	+87.0%
2010	1,765,495	+49.1%
2020	2,298,123	+30.2%

The following is based on Department of Statistics Malaysia 2010 census.

Ethnic groups in Petaling, 2010 census
Ethnicity	Population	Percentage
Bumiputera	873,787	48.20%
Chinese	580,639	32.03%
Indian	193,044	10.65%
Others	13,399	0.74%
Total	1,812,633	100%

== Administrative divisions ==

Petaling District is divided into 4 mukims. It was formed in 1974 by incorporating mukim Bukit Raja and Damansara (formerly parts of the Klang District) with mukim Sungai Buloh and Petaling, which were part of Kuala Lumpur District. However, this definition is for historic administrative purposes only and does not reflect the modern rapid growth and subsequent reorganisation in 1997.

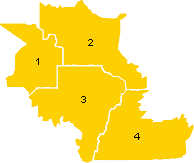
1. Bukit Raja; 2. Sungai Buloh; 3. Damansara; 4. Petaling

=== Government ===
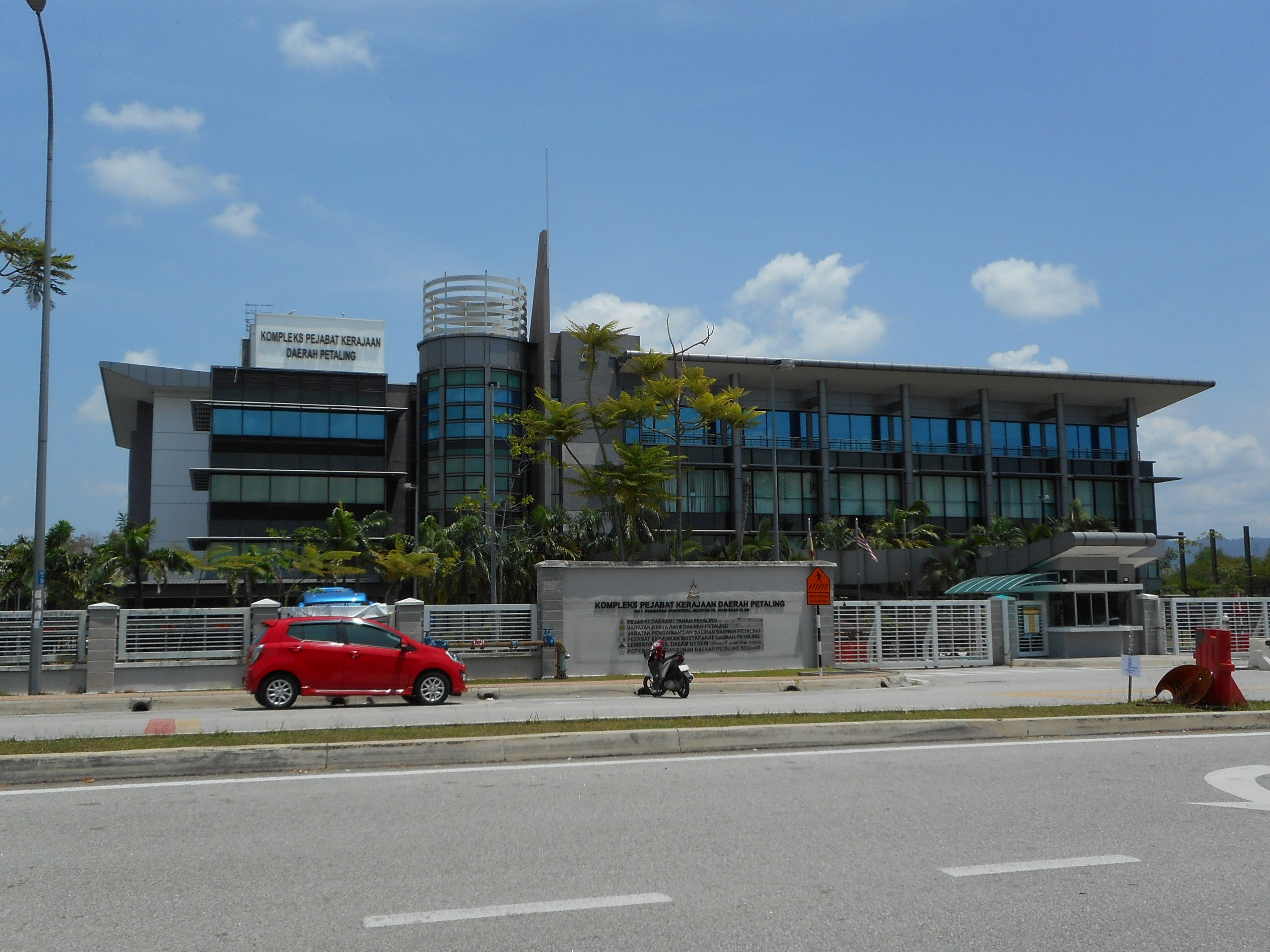
Petaling District and Land Office

3 local government jurisdictions of Petaling District, red is Petaling Jaya, Upper white is Shah Alam (there is spillover to Klang District not shown), and lower white is Subang Jaya.

The district is highly urbanised, and as such, the administration and maintenance of the public facilities in the district have been divided and delegated to three local governments.

Shah Alam City Council

The Shah Alam City Council (MBSA) governs the city of Shah Alam. It also exercises jurisdiction over parts of the south of Klang District, and Sungai Buloh, as well as the areas of Bukit Raja, Setia Alam and Subang, all of which fall under Shah Alam's postal code borders.

Petaling Jaya City Council

The city council (MBPJ) administers the enitrety of the city of Petaling Jaya which includes Damansara (Petaling Jaya Utara, PJU), central Petaling Jaya, most of Petaling Jaya Selatan (PJS) (except PJS7, PJS9 and PJS11, collectively known as Bandar Sunway, which are part of Subang Jaya and administered by its city council), and the neighbourhoods of SS1-SS11 and SS20-SS26 of Subang-Sungai Way (the remaining middle portion is also part of Subang Jaya).

In 1997, former areas of Petaling Jaya (which at that time was still a municipality under the jurisdiction of the Petaling Jaya Municipal Council) were ceded to the separate Petaling District Council. These areas, which now include Bandar Sunway, SS12-SS19 of Subang-Sungai Way, UEP Subang Jaya and Putra Heights, formed the new municipality of Subang Jaya, with the district council becoming the Subang Jaya Municipal Council (MPSJ). Both Petaling Jaya and Subang Jaya were accorded city status in 2006 and 2020 respectively, with their municipal councils being elevated to city councils.

Subang Jaya City Council

The city council governs the southern parts of the district, which consist of the city of Subang Jaya (comprising the neighbourhoods of SS12-SS19 of Subang-Sungai Way, Bandar Sunway, UEP Subang Jaya, Putra Heights and Batu Tiga), as well as the township of Seri Kembangan and a majority of Puchong.

== Federal Parliament and State Assembly Seats ==
Petaling, Selangor Parliament and State Assembly Electoral Districts

List of Petaling district representatives in the Federal Parliament (Dewan Rakyat)

Parliament	Seat Name	Member of Parliament	Party
P103	Puchong	Yeo Bee Yin	Pakatan Harapan (DAP)
P104	Subang	vacant	—N/a
P105	Petaling Jaya	vacant	—N/a
P106	Damansara	Gobind Singh Deo	Pakatan Harapan (DAP)
P107	Sungai Buloh	Ramanan Ramakrishnan	Pakatan Harapan (PKR)
P108	Shah Alam	Azli Yusof	Pakatan Harapan (AMANAH)
P109	Kapar	Halimah Ali	Perikatan Nasional (PAS)
P111	Kota Raja	Mohamad Sabu	Pakatan Harapan (AMANAH)

List of Petaling district representatives in the State Legislative Assembly (Dewan Undangan Negeri)

Parliament	State	Seat Name	State Assemblyman	Party
P102	N28	Sri Kembangan	Wong Siew Ki	Pakatan Harapan (DAP)
P103	N29	Seri Serdang	Abbas Azmi	Pakatan Harapan (AMANAH)
P104	N30	Kinrara	Ng Sze Han	Pakatan Harapan (DAP)
P104	N31	Subang Jaya	Michelle Ng Mei Sze	Pakatan Harapan (DAP)
P105	N32	Seri Setia	Fahmi Ngah	Pakatan Harapan (PKR)
P105	N33	Taman Medan	Afif Bahardin	Perikatan Nasional (BERSATU)
P105	N34	Bukit Gasing	Rajiv Rishyakaran	Pakatan Harapan (DAP)
P106	N35	Kampung Tunku	Lim Yi Wei	Pakatan Harapan (DAP)
P106	N36	Bandar Utama	Jamaliah Jamaluddin	Pakatan Harapan (DAP)
P106	N37	Bukit Lanjan	Pua Pei Ling	Pakatan Harapan (PKR)
P107	N38	Paya Jaras	Abdul Halim Tamuri	Perikatan Nasional (PAS)
P107	N39	Kota Damansara	Muhammad Izuan Kasim	Pakatan Harapan (PKR)
P108	N40	Kota Anggerik	Mohd Najwan Halimi	Pakatan Harapan (PKR)
P108	N41	Batu Tiga	Danial Al Rashid	Pakatan Harapan (AMANAH)
P109	N42	Meru	Mariam Abdul Rashid	Pakatan Harapan (AMANAH)
P111	N50	Kota Kemuning	Preakas Sampunathan	Pakatan Harapan (DAP)

== See also ==
- Districts of Malaysia
