= Setia Alam =

Township in Shah Alam

Coordinates: 3.100872°N 101.4587302°E

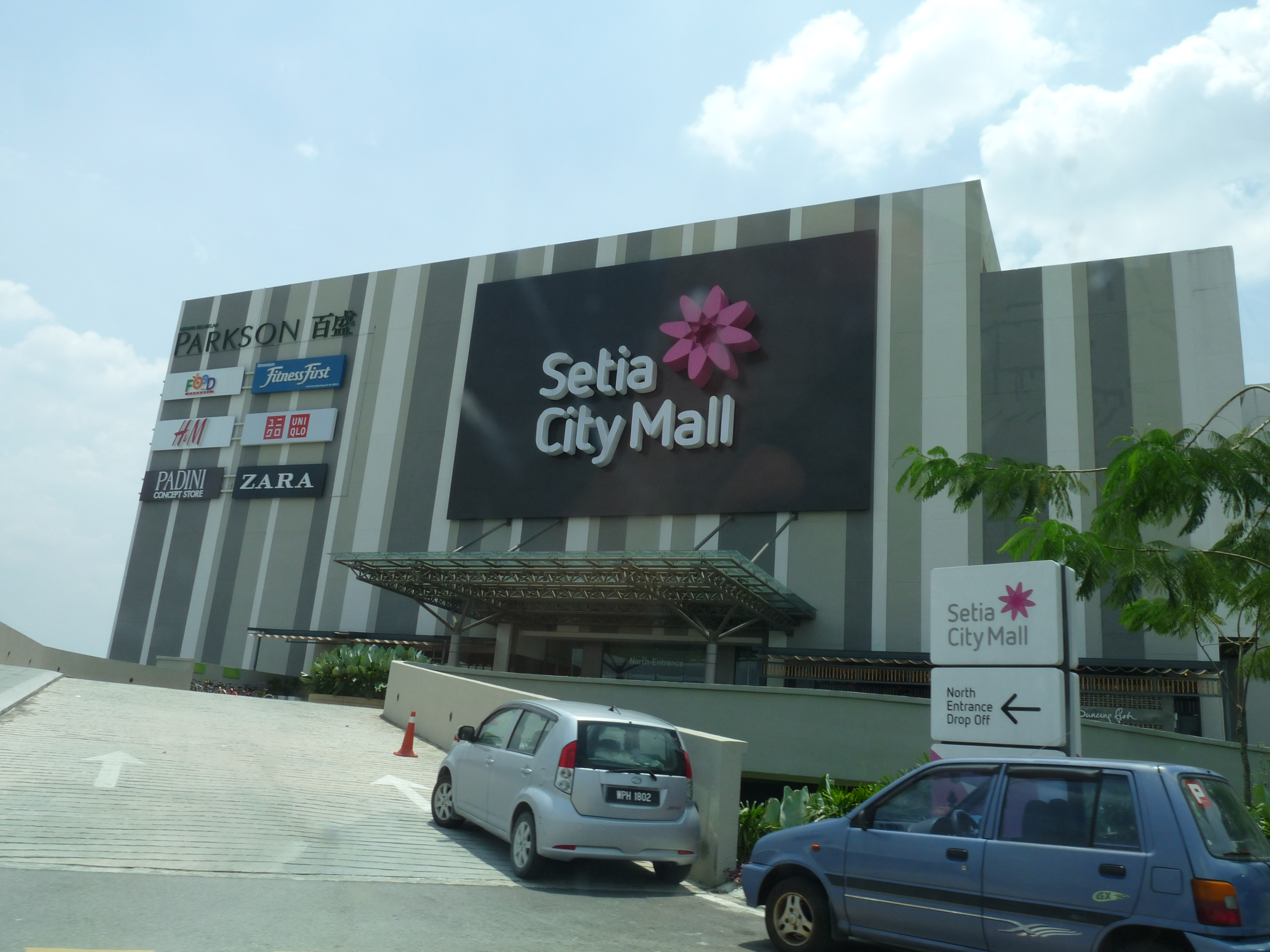
Setia City Mall, Setia Alam

Setia Alam is an integrated and modern township located in Shah Alam, Selangor, Malaysia. It is accessible via Setia Alam Highway from the New Klang Valley Expressway (NKVE) since the interchange opened on 14 July 2006. Setia Alam is also accessible from the Federal Highway and Klang via Jalan Meru. This township is developed by S P Setia Berhad.

Setia Alam is an integrated development spanning over 4,000 acres (16 km^{2}) of land. It falls under the jurisdiction of the Shah Alam City Council (MBSA), which has placed restrictions on the establishment of entertainment outlets such as pubs, discos, and lottery businesses.

Setia Alam is represented in the Parliament by Azli Yusof, the Member of Parliament for Shah Alam, and Mohd Najwan Halimi, the State Assemblyman for Kota Anggerik.

== History ==
This RM 20 billion township was launched in 2004 by SP Setia Berhad. It was formerly known as North Hummock Estate, which the family-controlled See Hoy Chan Group owned. However, instead of developing the land, the group sold it to SP Setia.

The project consists of a few major developments marketed as Setia Alam (a 2,525-acre integrated township with mixed residential and commercial development), Setia Eco Park (791 acres of fully gated and guarded luxury semi-dee and bungalow development and is Malaysia's first eco township), Setia City (a 240-acre integrated green city centre development), and Alam Nusantara by PKNS and Anjung Sari by Sazean Group. Both Alam Nusantara's and Anjung Sari's lands (totalling 614.26 acres) were sold by SP Setia to PKNS as part of SP Setia's strategies to develop the Setia Alam development. SP Setia's Setia Alam and Setia Eco Park townships have won several awards locally and internationally, including the World's Best Master Plan Development for Setia Eco Park in FIABCI International Prix d'Excellence Award 2007 held in Barcelona, Spain. In 2013, Setia Alam won the World's Best Master Plan Development in FIABCI, held in Taichung, Taiwan.

== Location and accessibility ==
Setia Alam is located on the western flank of Shah Alam, just adjacent to its boundary with Klang. It is served by a spur route of the NKVE. Selangor State Route (Jalan Meru) links Setia Alam to Puncak Alam and ultimately Kuala Selangor due north and downtown Klang due south. WCE is also linked to Setia Alam via Jalan Meru.

The closest rail station is the KTM Klang, which is about 7.6km south. The Pasar Klang LRT station is about 6 km south. There are 3 bus routes around Setia Alam like the RapidKL bus route 753 connects Setia Alam to the Section 14 bus hub in downtown Shah Alam, Smart Selangor bus route BK02 (SU13A) which looped around the township via Setia City Mall and De Palma Apartment and the LRT feeder bus route T728 from the Pasar Klang LRT station which connects Bandar Bukit Raja and Setia City Mall.

Traffic congestion along the NKVE-Setia Alam Link, during rush hour, has become rampant in recent years as more residents moved into the township, especially with the completion of apartments at Setia Alam North and spillover from neighboring townships, such as Bandar Bukit Raja, Aman Perdana, and Meru. A RM7,000,000 upgrade to the Setia Alam (Eco Ardence) interchange was announced in March 2023 and completed in the same year.

== Amenities and facilities ==
Setia Alam is home to Setia City Mall, a vibrant shopping complex and the biggest in Shah Alam. It is a joint venture project between S P Setia and Asian Retail Investment Fund. The township also comprises two multi-purpose convention centers; Setia City Convention Centre Hall 1 & 2 that are fully capable for meetings, incentives, conferences, exhibitions and banquets.

Next to Setia City Mall, is the Courtyard by Marriott Setia Alam, a 4-star hotel directly linked to Setia City Mall from the NKVE, catered to business travelers.

It also houses a Lotus's, Econsave, Urbanfresh Marketplace, Jaya Grocer and Village Grocer.

== Automotive service centres ==
- Proton
- Perodua
- BMW
- Mini Cars
- Mercedes Benz
- Volvo
- Subaru
- Mazda
- Toyota
- Honda
- BYD
- GWM

== Local Attraction ==
Pasar Malam Setia Alam is one of longest night market in Malaysia, stretching an impressive 2.4 km. Open every Saturday from 4.30 pm to 10 pm.

Located between north of Shah Alam National Botanical Gardens and south of Bukit Cherakah Forest Reserve and the north-east of Setia Alam township, lies the Shah Alam Community Forest formerly known as Setia Alam Community Trail, a hiking trail that leads to the mirror lake bordering Bandar Nusa Rhu. The lake is known for its crystal-clear emerald waters that reflect the surrounding trees with a stunning view.
