= Selangor State Route B9 =

Road in Malaysia

Selangor Route 9
- Batu Tiga–Sungai Buloh Highway
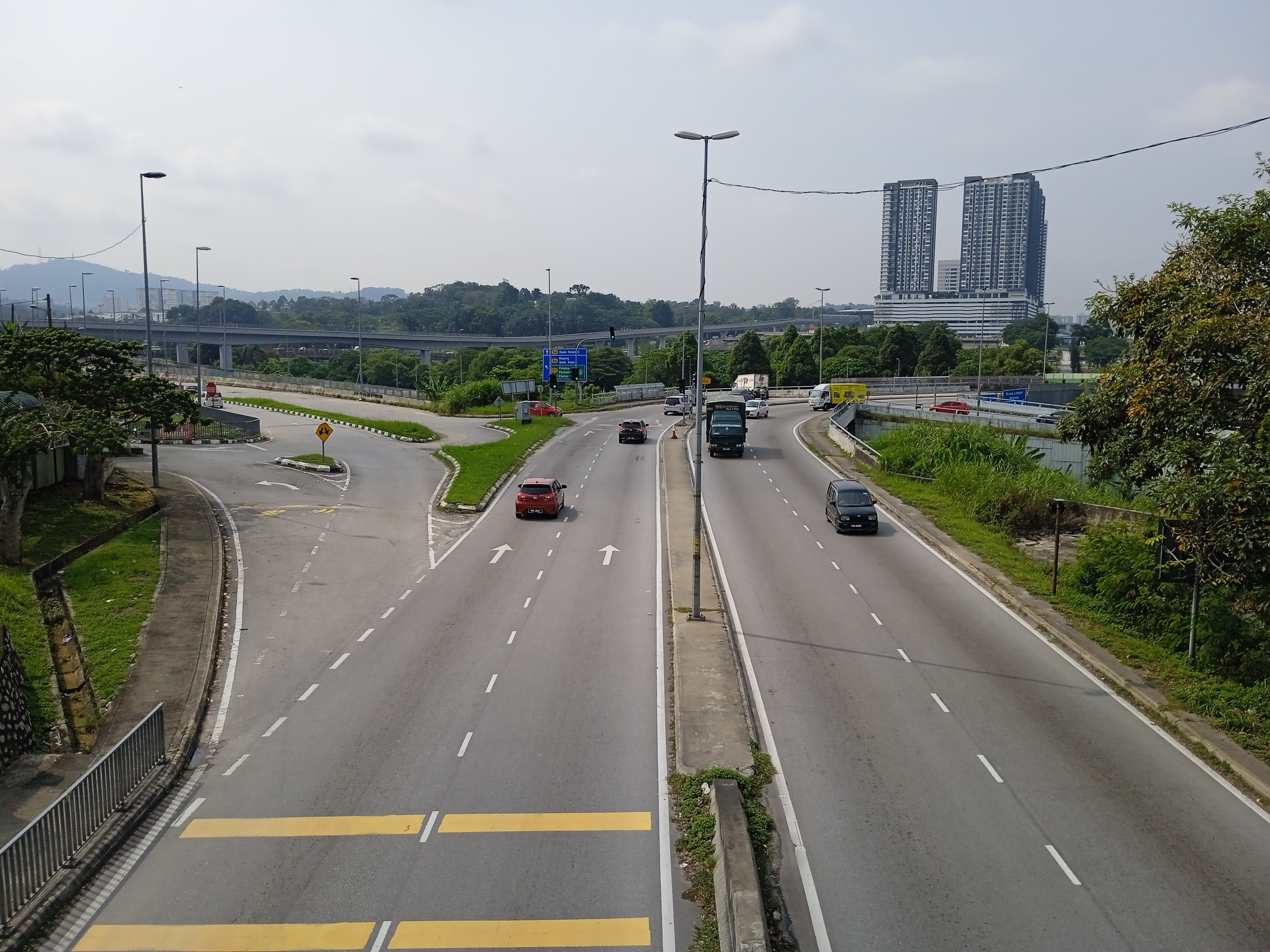

Route information
- Existed: 2001–present
- History: Completed in 2000

Major junctions
- Guthrie Corridor Expressway; FT 54 Jalan Kuala Selangor–Kepong; FT 3213 Persiaran Kerjaya; FT 2 Federal Highway

Location
- Country: Malaysia
- Primary destinations: Sungai Buloh Hospital, Sungai Buloh, Bukit Subang, Bukit Jelutong, TTDI Jaya, Giant Shah Alam, Melawati Stadium, Glenmarie

Highway system
- Highways in Malaysia; Expressways; Federal; State

Batu Tiga–Sungai Buloh Highway, Selangor State Route B9, also known as Jalan Hospital, Jalan Subang, Persiaran Gerbang Utama, Persiaran Tebar Layar and Jalan Monfort, is the main highway in Klang Valley, Malaysia connects from Batu Tiga Interchange in Batu Tiga to Sungai Buloh Hospital in Sungai Buloh. The highway overlaps with a few roads with the same name but different code: FT15 and FT3214. At the Politeknik Junction, it extends towards the eastern side of Shah Alam which is the Persiaran Sukan. The Persiaran Sukan is basically a ring road that covers the eastern side of Shah Alam with some one-way road. The highway was upgraded in 2008.

== Route background ==
The Kilometre Zero of the Batu Tiga–Sungai Buloh Highway starts at a few locations. The Main Link Kilometre starts at Hospital Sungai Buloh Junction Exit B901. The Jalan Monfort Kilometre starts at Politeknik Junction Exit B918, and the Persiaran Sukan Kilometre starts at the Stadium Interchange Exit B924.

== History ==
To solve the traffic jam in local government administrative area, the Selangor government take the initiative to upgrade the existing roads, include upgrade Route B9/FT15 from Subang Airport to Sungai Buloh Hospital, upgrade Jalan Monfort B9 from Politeknik Shah Alam Junction.

Until 15 June 2024, the progress of new road construction from Sungai Buloh Hospital to Kampung Seri Indah A is 78.91% and expected completed on 9 September 2024.

== Features ==
=== Notable features ===
- Alternative road to Sungai Buloh
- Many traffic lights along the highway
- 4 lanes (2 at each direction) Upgrade carriageway from Politeknik Interchange Until Bukit Jelutong Interchange

At most sections, the State Route B9 was built under the JKR R5 road standard, with a speed limit of 90 km/h.

=== Overlaps ===
- Kampung Melayu Subang–Hospital Sungai Buloh-MRR2 Interchange: FT15 Jalan Subang
- Politeknik Junction–Batu Tiga Interchange: FT287 Jalan Subang–Batu Tiga

=== Alternate routes ===
- Bukit Jelutong North Interchange–Politeknik Junction: E35 Guthrie Corridor Expressway

== Incidents ==
- On 30 September 2025, heavy vehicle made a U-turn at the entrance to an intersection with a sign prohibiting U-turns, crashed a Proton Saga parked at the side of Jalan Hospital.

== Junction lists ==
The entire route is located in Petaling District, Selangor.

Legend:

- I/C - Interchange, I/S - Intersection, RSA - Rest and service area, OBR - Overhead bridge restaurant, R/R - Restaurant and rest plaza, L/B - Layby, V/P - Vista point, TN - tunnel, T/P - Toll plaza, BR - Bridge
- C - Cloverleaf, S - Stack, T-A - Trumpet-A, T-B - Trumpet-B, DT - Directional-T/Y, SDT - Semi-Directional-T/Y, P-Y - Partial-Y, D - Diamond, P-C - Partial cloverleaf, D-D - Diverging diamond, D-R - Direct ramp

=== Main Route ===
Location	km	mi	Exit	Name	Destinations	Notes
Sungai Buloh	0.0	0.0	B901A	Sungai Buloh Hospital I/S A	Sungai Buloh Hospital	Junctions
Sungai Buloh				Pusat Kawalan Kusta Negara		T-Junctions
Sungai Buloh			B901B	Sungai Buloh Hospital I/S B	Sungai Buloh Hospital	T-Junctions
Sungai Buloh			B902	Sungai Buloh Hospital-NSE I/C	North–South Expressway Northern Route / AH2 – Bukit Kayu Hitam, Ipoh, Rawang, Kuala Lumpur, Kuantan, Petaling Jaya; New Road – Taman Desa Bukit Indah	Roundabout
Sungai Buloh			B903	Jalan Kusta Sungai Buloh I/S	Jalan Kusta Sungai Buloh – Jalan Kampung Melayu Bt 13	T-Junctions
Sungai Buloh				Sungai Buloh station	Sungai Buloh station – KTM ETS 12	From Sungai Buloh Hospital only
Sungai Buloh			Railway Crossing Bridge			
Sungai Buloh	3.8	2.4	B904A	Sungai Buloh Hospital–Sungai Buloh Highway A I/C	FT 54 Sungai Buloh Highway – Kuala Selangor, Ijok, Kuang, Sungai Buloh, Rawang	Trumpet interchange Western terminus of concurrency with FT54.
Sungai Buloh	4.1– 4.2	2.5– 2.6	B904B	Sungai Buloh Hospital–Sungai Buloh Highway B I/C	FT 54 Sungai Buloh Highway – Kepong, Kuala Lumpur, Seremban, Damansara, Puchong, Selayang, Ampang, Ipoh, Batu Caves, Bukit Kayu hitam, Cheras, Hulu Langat, Kajang	Diamond Interchange; Eastern terminus of concurrency with FT54.
Kampung Baru Sungai Buloh				U-Turn	U-Turn	Sungai Buloh Hospital Bound; Northern terminus of concurrency with FT15.
Kampung Baru Sungai Buloh	5.0	3.1		Sungai Buloh Camp	Sungai Buloh Camp	T-Junctions
Kampung Baru Sungai Buloh				Kampung Selamat station	Kampung Selamat station 12	
Kampung Baru Sungai Buloh				Kampung Baru Sungai Buloh	Jalan Welfare (Welfare Road) – Kampung Baru Sungai Buloh	T-Junctions
Kwasa Damansara				Persiaran Surian I/S	Persiaran Sungai Buloh – Persiaran Surian	T-Junctions
Kwasa Damansara				RRIM I/C	Damansara–Shah Alam Elevated Expressway – Kepong, Sungai Buloh, Bandar Sri Damansara, Petaling Jaya, Puchong, Putrajaya, Cyberjaya, Sungai Besi	Exit only to Damansara
Kwasa Damansara			B905	Terminal 3 I/S	FT 15 Sultan Abdul Aziz Shah Airport Highway – Terminal 3, Kelana Jaya, Subang Jaya, Shah Alam	T-Junctions; Southern terminus of concurrency with FT15.
Kwasa Damansara				Persiaran Galaksi I/S	Persiaran Galaksi – Taman Mutiara Subang, Persiaran Fajar	T-Junctions; Northern terminus of concurrency with FT287.
Kwasa Damansara			Start/end of four lane carriageway Start/end of dual lane carriageway			
Subang			B906	Bukit Subang I/C	Persiaran Elektron – Bukit Subang, Denai Alam; Guthrie Corridor Expressway – Shah Alam, Rawang, Ipoh, Kuala Lumpur	Half Diamond Interchange
Subang			Pelampas River Bridge			
Subang				Jalan Jingga U9/39 I/S	Jalan Jingga U9/39	T-Junctions
Subang			Start/end of dual lane carriageway Start/end of four lane carriageway			
Subang			B907	Kampung Melayu Subang I/S	Jalan Kampung Melayu Subang – Subang, Kampung Melayu Subang, Monterez Golf Club and Resort	Junctions; Southern terminus of concurrency with FT287.
Bukit Jelutong			B908	Batu Arang I/S	B49 Selangor State Route B49 – Puncak Alam, Batu Arang, Kuala Selangor	T-Junctions
Bukit Jelutong			B909; 3506	Bukit Jelutong North I/C	Guthrie Corridor Expressway – Ipoh, Rawang, Sungai Buloh, Shah Alam, Klang, Kuala Lumpur	Half Diamond Interchange
Bukit Jelutong			B910	Bulatan Lelangit I/C	Bukit Jelutong	Roundabout Interchange
Bukit Jelutong			B911	Bulatan Gerbang Utama I/C	Bukit Jelutong, Klang, Kuala Lumpur	Roundabout Interchange
Bukit Jelutong			B912	Bulatan Tebar Layar I/C	Bukit Jelutong	Roundabout Interchange
Bukit Jelutong			B913; 3507	Bukit Jelutong Sentral I/C	Guthrie Corridor Expressway – Rawang, Ipoh, Kuala Selangor, Subang, Shah Alam, Petaling Jaya, Kuala Lumpur, Klang, Kuala Lumpur International Airport (KLIA), Johor Bahru	Parclo A4
Bukit Jelutong			B914	Balai Bomba Bukit Jelutong I/C	Shah Alam, Bukit Jelutong	Junctions
TTDI Jaya			Sungai Damansara Bridge			
TTDI Jaya			B915	TUDM I/S	Other factories, Royal Malaysian Air Force (RMAF) Subang Air Base	Junctions
TTDI Jaya			B916	Space U8 I/S	Other factories, Space U8	Junctions
TTDI Jaya				Jalan Sastera	Jalan Sastera – TTDI Jaya, Ilham Apartment	Junctions
TTDI Jaya			Sungai Damansara Bridge			
TTDI Jaya				TTDI Jaya	TTDI Jaya	Junctions
TTDI Jaya				Jalan Ilham	Jalan Ilham – TTDI Jaya, Ilham Apartment, Royal Malaysia Police (PDRM) Weapon Storing Complex	Junctions
TTDI Jaya	1.0	0.62	–			
TTDI Jaya				Jalan Sastera	Jalan Sastera – TTDI Jaya, Ilham Apartment, Mayang Sutera	Junctions
TTDI Jaya			Petronas L/B (Batu Tiga bound) – Petronas petrol stations with Dunkin Doughnut			
TTDI Jaya			B917	Monfort I/S	Monfort Boys Town, Monfort Girls Centre, Politeknik Sultan Salahudin Abdul Aziz Shah	T-Junctions
Shah Alam	0.0	0.0	B918	Politeknik I/S	B9 Persiaran Sukan – Shah Alam; Guthrie Corridor Expressway – Ipoh, Rawang, Kuala Selangor, Sungai Buloh, Bukit Jelutong, Klang, Kuala Lumpur International Airport (KLIA), Johor Bahru	Junctions
Shah Alam			Shell L/B (Sungai Buloh bound) – Shell petrol stations with 7-Eleven, Naza showroom Northern terminus of concurrency with FT286.			
Shah Alam			B919A	Persiaran Kerjaya I/S	FT 3213 Persiaran Kerjaya – Subang, Glenmarie, Subang Jaya, Subang Airport	T-Junctions
Shah Alam			B919B	Brunsfield I/S	B9 Persiaran Sukan – Shah Alam	T-Junctions
Shah Alam			B920	Glenmarie I/S	Jalan Batu Tiga–Glenmarie – Kampung Batu Tiga, Glenmarie	T-Junctions
Shah Alam			B921; 215	Batu Tiga I/C	FT 2 Federal Highway – Port Klang, Sungai Rasau, I-City, Shah Alam, Subang Jaya, Petaling Jaya, Bangsar, Kuala Lumpur	Diamond Interchange; Southern terminus of concurrency with FT286.
Shah Alam			Through to FT 286 Malaysia Federal Route 286			
1.000 mi = 1.609 km; 1.000 km = 0.621 mi: Concurrency terminus; Incomplete access

=== Persiaran Sukan ===
Location	km	mi	Exit	Name	Destinations	Notes
Section 13			B918	Politeknik I/S	FT 286 ( FT 287) Malaysia Federal Route 286 – Sungai Buloh, TTDI Jaya, Bukit Jelutong, Bukit Subang, Batu Tiga, Shah Alam, Glenmarie, Kuala Lumpur, Klang, Subang Jaya; Guthrie Corridor Expressway – Ipoh, Rawang, Kuala Selangor, Sungai Buloh, Bukit Jelutong, Klang, Kuala Lumpur International Airport (KLIA), Johor Bahru	Junctions
Section 13			Sungai Damansara Bridge			
Section 13			B922	Giant I/S	B9 Persiaran Sukan – Giant Shah Alam, Shah Alam, Klang	Junctions
Section 13				Giant Entrance	Giant Shah Alam	Northbound
Section 13				Shah Alam Stadium	Shah Alam Stadium, Melawati Stadium	T-Junctions
Section 13			B923	Batu Tiga–Sungai Buloh Highway; Persiaran Sukan Link I/S	B9 Batu Tiga–Sungai Buloh Highway (Persiaran Sukan Link) – Batu Tiga, Sungai Buloh, Shah Alam, Glenmarie, Klang, Kuala Lumpur, Rawang, Ipoh	T-Junctions
Section 13				MSU I/S	Management & Science University (MSU), Tesco Extra Shah Alam	LILO Junction Southbound
Section 13				Tesco Road	Tesco Extra Shah Alam; Tesco Shah Alam; Kuala Lumpur; Shah Alam; TTDI Adina (U/C)	T-Junctions
Section 13			Petronas L/B (westbound) – Petronas petrol stations with Dunkin Doughnut			
Section 13				D' Kayangan	D' Kayangan Housing Area	LILO Junction Westbound
Section 13				Shah Alam Stadium	Shah Alam Stadium	LILO Junction Eastbound
Section 13	4.3	2.7	–			
Section 13	0.0	0.0	B924	Stadium I/C	Persiaran Hishamuddin – Shah Alam, Tesco Shah Alam, TTDI Adina (U/C), Klang, UiTM Shah Alam, D' Kayangan Housing Area	Roundabout Interchange
Section 13				Section 13	Section 13	LILO Junction Northbound
Section 13				Section 13	Section 13 Mini Stadium	T-Junctions
Section 13			B925	Section 13 I/S	Section 13	Junctions
Section 13			B926	KGSAAS I/S	KGSAAS Housing Area, PPAS Library, KGSAAS Golf Club, Laman Seri Housing Area	Junctions
Section 13	1.7	1.1		Section 13	Laman Seri Business Park, Section 13 Shop Lot	LILO Junctions (West=Northbound, East=Southbound)
Section 13	1.8	1.1	B927	Section 13 Shop Lot	Section 13 Shop Lot	T-Junctions
Section 13			One Way			
1.000 mi = 1.609 km; 1.000 km = 0.621 mi: Incomplete access

=== Persiaran Sukan (one way) ===
Location	km	mi	Exit	Name	Destinations	Notes
Section 13				Laman Seri Business Park	Laman Seri Business Park	LILO Junction
Section 13				Section 13	Section 13 Shop Lot	Right In (RI) Junction
Section 13			B928	Section 13	B9 Persiaran Sukan (one way) – Shah Alam, Section 13	RIRO Junction
Section 13			B922	Giant I/S	B9 Persiaran Sukan – Batu Tiga, Sungai Buloh, Kuala Lumpur, Klang, TTDI Jaya, Bukit Jelutong, Batu Arang, Shah Alam, Klang, Tesco Extra Shah Alam, MSU Shah Alam, Tesco Shah Alam	Junctions
Section 13				Giant Shah Alam	Giant Shah Alam	LILO Junction
Section 13				Shah Alam Stadium	Shah Alam Stadium	LILO Junction
Section 13			B928	Section 13	B9 Persiaran Sukan (one way) – Shah Alam, Section 13, Kuala Lumpur, Klang, Batu Tiga, Sungai Buloh	RIRO Junction
Section 13			B925	Section 13 I/S	B9 Persiaran Sukan – Section 13	Junctions
1.000 mi = 1.609 km; 1.000 km = 0.621 mi: Incomplete access
