= Malaysia Federal Route 287 =

Road in Malaysia

Federal Route 287
- Jalan Subang–Batu Tiga

Route information
- Maintained by Malaysian Public Works Department

Major junctions
- North end: Subang
- FT 15 Federal Route 15; Guthrie Corridor Expressway; New Klang Valley Expressway / AH2; B9 State Route B9; FT 3213 Persiaran Kerjaya; FT 2 Federal Highway
- South end: Batu Tiga, Shah Alam

Location
- Country: Malaysia
- Primary destinations: Sungai Buloh, Shah Alam, Glenmarie, Taman TTDI Jaya

Highway system
- Highways in Malaysia; Expressways; Federal; State

Federal Route 287, Jalan Subang–Batu Tiga or Persiaran Jubli Perak, and Jalan Subang (formerly part of Federal Route 3214 and Selangor State Route B9), is a major highway in Klang Valley region, Selangor, Malaysia.

== History ==
On 25 March 2025, the Subang–Shah Alam sections of the Federal Route 3214 is gazetted as Federal Route 386.

== Junction lists ==
The entire route is located in Petaling District, Selangor.

Legend:

- I/C - Interchange, I/S - Intersection, RSA - Rest and service area, OBR - Overhead bridge restaurant, R/R - Restaurant and rest plaza, L/B - Layby, V/P - Vista point, TN - tunnel, T/P - Toll plaza, BR - Bridge
- C - Cloverleaf, S - Stack, T-A - Trumpet-A, T-B - Trumpet-B, DT - Directional-T/Y, SDT - Semi-Directional-T/Y, P-Y - Partial-Y, D - Diamond, P-C - Partial cloverleaf, D-D - Diverging diamond, D-R - Direct ramp

Location	km	mi	Exit	Name	Destinations	Notes
Subang				Subang North	FT 15 Malaysia Federal Route 15 – Sungai Buloh, Kuala Selangor, Kepong, Kota Damansara; FT 15 Sultan Abdul Aziz Shah Airport Highway – Subang, Sultan Abdul Aziz Shah Airport, Petaling Jaya, Subang Jaya	T-junctions
Subang				Taman Mutrara Subang (Section U5)	Persiaran Galaksi – Taman Mutiara Subang	Junctions
Subang				Kampung Melayu Subang (Section U5)	Jalan Bukit Badak – Kampung Melayu Subang, Metro Driving Academy	Junctions
Subang				Bukit Subang (Section U--)	Persiaran Metafasa – Bukit Subang; Guthrie Corridor Expressway – Kuala Selangor, Rawang, Ipoh	Half-diamond interchange
Subang				Kampung Melayu Subang (Section U5)	Jalan Kampung Melayu Subang – Monterez Golf and Country Club (Section U--), Sunway Kayangan (Section U--), Kampung Baru Subang, Metro Driving Academy	Junctions
Bukit Jelutong				Persiaran Mokhtar Dahari	B49 Persiaran Mokhtar Dahari – Puncak Alam, Batu Arang, Kuala Selangor	T-junctions
Bukit Jelutong				Bukit Jelutong North	Persiaran Gerbang Utama – Bukit Jelutong; Guthrie Corridor Expressway – Rawang, Ipoh, Kuala Selangor	Half-diamond interchange
Bukit Jelutong				Bukit Jelutong North–Jalan Monfort	See also Guthrie Corridor Expressway	
Shah Alam			Through to FT 286 Malaysia Federal Route 286			
1.000 mi = 1.609 km; 1.000 km = 0.621 mi: Concurrency terminus; Incomplete access; Route transition
