= Selangor State Route B49 =

Road in Malaysia

Selangor Route 49
- Persiaran Mokhtar Dahari (Shah Alam–Batu Arang Highway) (Puncak Alam Highway)
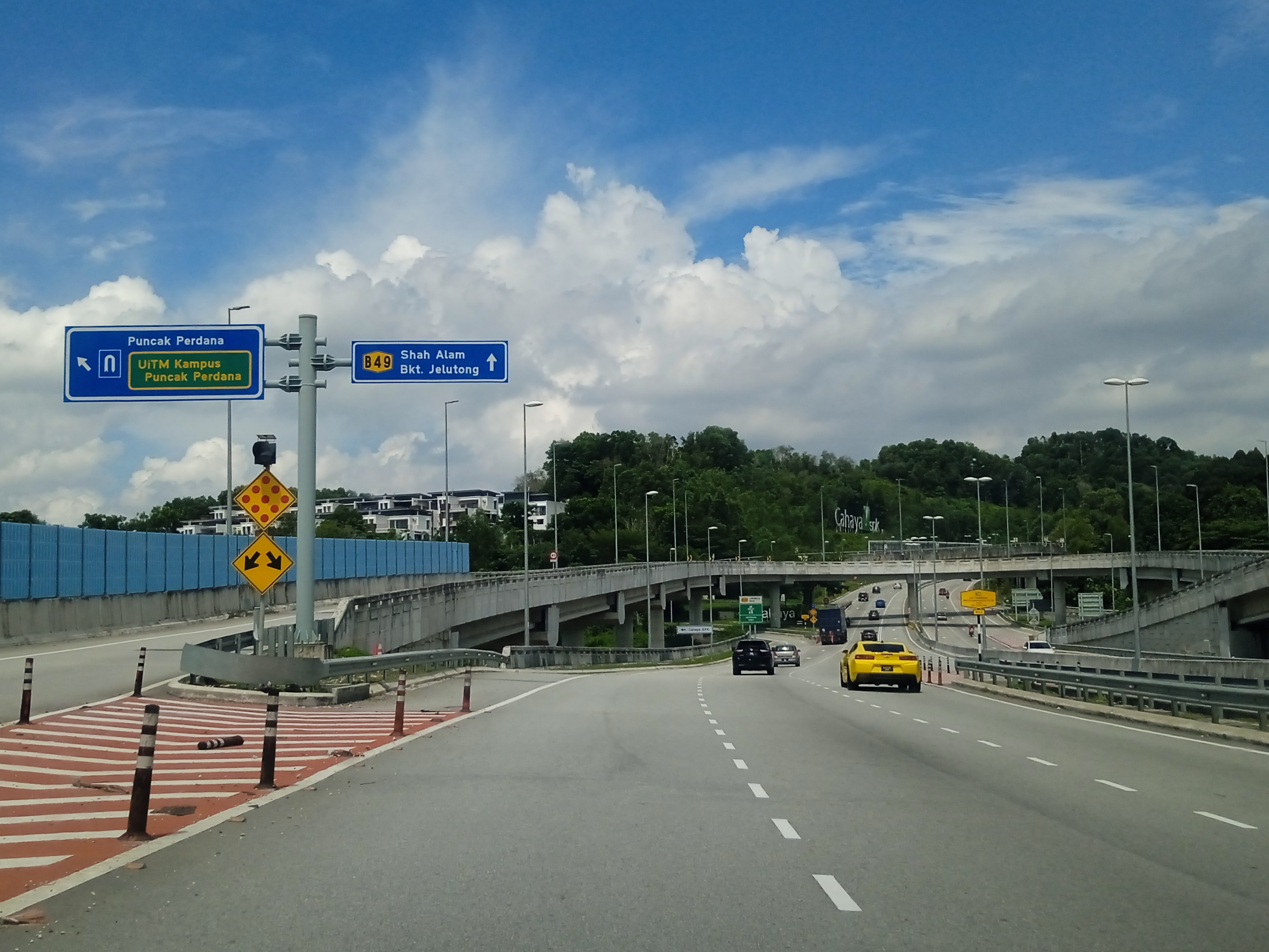

Route information
- Length: 17.2 km (10.7 mi)
- Existed: 1996–present
- History: Completed in 2003

Major junctions
- North end: Puncak Alam
- Jalan Paip; B1 State Route B1
- East end: FT 287 / B9 Federal Route 287

Location
- Country: Malaysia
- Primary destinations: Kuala Selangor, Jeram, Batu Arang, Kota Puteri, Puncak Perdana, Subang, Shah Alam, Setia Alam, Puncak Alam, Meru

Highway system
- Highways in Malaysia; Expressways; Federal; State

Persiaran Mokhtar Dahari, or Shah Alam–Batu Arang Highway or Puncak Alam Highway and Jalan Batu Arang, Selangor State Route B49, is a major highway in Selangor, Malaysia.

== Overview ==
The Shah Alam–Batu Arang Highway runs for 17.2 kilometers into the north-western direction from Jalan Subang–Batu Tiga (also known as Jalan Sungai Buloh-Guthrie Corridor Expressway interchange) (Federal Route 3214) towards Jalan Meru Tambahan.

The midsection of this stretch at the 8th kilometre connects to Jalan Paip which allows a shorter route to the town of Meru and Klang. The opposite end of this midsection intersection would reveal an access road leading to the entrance of the Subang Lake Dam, a major water catchment/reservoir for Subang and the surrounding vicinity. This particular access road is also the location of a high-profile case involving the murder of a Mongolian model Altantuya Shariibuu.

Starting as a common two-way traffic trunk road, its condition had since been improved with the addition of more lighting, overtaking lanes and extra road shoulders to cater for slower traffic and motorcyclists. Travellers will find that this particular road cuts through terrain that pass over undulating hill crests and green areas that used to be a forest reserve of Bukit Cherakah. Drivers could see warning sign erected cautioning traffic of crossing tapirs (tenuk) that once lived in the forest areas. Similar precaution should also be exercised to give way to macaques (monkeys) that commonly scavenge along, and cross this particular road. Road accidents involving these precious wildlife had previously been reported, despite precautionary measures and relocation activities by the authorities.

Motorists should expect heavy traffic volume or bumper to bumper congestion heading towards Guthrie Corridor Expressway from 6.00 a.m. up to 9.00 a.m on workdays, and similar traffic pattern towards Puncak Alam beginning from 4.30 p.m up to 8.00 p.m. The traffic flow would be adversely affected by a mere drizzle of the rain, vehicle breakdown, or any type of traffic accident.

== Route background ==
The Kilometre Zero of the highway starts at Subang–Bukit Jelutong junctions.

== History ==
The Shah Alam–Batu Arang Highway was built by a joint venture between Oxford Alliance Sdn. Bhd. and the Selangor state government to cater for the needs of a better access to the new township of Puncak Alam. However, the construction of the second phase of the road was delayed for two years due to the effect of the 1997 Asian financial crisis before being resumed in 1999. The highway was opened to motorists on 28 February 2003.

In 2014, the highway was renamed as Persiaran Mokhtar Dahari in honour of legendary Malaysian footballer Mokhtar Dahari.

== Features ==
=== Unique features and place of interest ===
One stretch of this road cuts across a lake within the vicinity of Puncak Perdana, virtually cutting the lake into two sections by the road landfill. This scenic spot is frequently visited by anglers due to its easy accessibility.

The green areas leading to and around the Subang Lake Dam, and also other roadside tracks along this highway also appears to be a popular trekking and mountain biking spot.

At most sections, the Federal Route B49 was built under the JKR R5 road standard, allowing maximum speed limit of up to 90 km/h.

== Junction lists ==
The entire route is located in Selangor.

Legend:

- I/C - Interchange, I/S - Intersection, RSA - Rest and service area, OBR - Overhead bridge restaurant, R/R - Restaurant and rest plaza, L/B - Layby, V/P - Vista point, TN - tunnel, T/P - Toll plaza, BR - Bridge
- C - Cloverleaf, S - Stack, T-A - Trumpet-A, T-B - Trumpet-B, DT - Directional-T/Y, SDT - Semi-Directional-T/Y, P-Y - Partial-Y, D - Diamond, P-C - Partial cloverleaf, D-D - Diverging diamond, D-R - Direct ramp

District	Location	km	mi	Exit	Name	Destinations	Notes
Kuala Selangor	Puncak Alam	16.6	10.3	11	Puncak Alam; Puncak Alam I/S	Persiaran Puncak Alam – Puncak Alam; B1 Selangor State Route B1 – Kuala Selangor, Ijok, Bestari Jaya (Batang Berjuntai), Batu Arang, Meru, Setia Alam, Kapar, Klang, Universiti Teknologi MARA (UiTM) Puncak Alam Campus; Kuala Lumpur–Kuala Selangor Expressway – Kuala Selangor, Kuala Lumpur, Rawang, Ipoh	Junctions
Kuala Selangor	Puncak Alam			Sungai Buloh Bridge			
Kuala Selangor	Puncak Alam	16.0	9.9	–			
Kuala Selangor	Saujana Utama			10	Saujana Utama I/S	Jalan Saujana Utama – Saujana Utama, Paya Jaras, Sungai Buloh; Universiti Teknologi MARA (UiTM) Puncak Alam Campus – Gate A	Junctions
Petaling	Bukit Cherakah			Bukit Cherakah forest reserve			
Petaling	Bukit Cherakah			Subang Lake Dam (Empangan Tasik Subang)			
Petaling	Bukit Cherakah	8.0	5.0	9	Jalan Paip I/S	Jalan Paip – Meru, Kapar, Klang	T-junctions
Petaling	Bukit Cherakah			8	U14 I/S	Greenhill Residence	T-junctions
Petaling	Bukit Cherakah			7	Alam Budiman I/S	Persiaran Pulau Lumut – Alam Budiman, Setia Alam	T-junctions
Petaling	Puncak Perdana			Puncak Perdana Lake			
Petaling	Puncak Perdana			6B	Puncak Perdana; Puncak Perdana (West) I/S	Jalan Pulau Angsa U10/13 – Puncak Perdana, Universiti Teknologi MARA (UiTM) Puncak Perdana Campus U-Turn Flyover – Sunway Alam Suria, Bukit Jelutong, Shah Alam	LILO junctions, Puncak Alam bound only. U-Turn to Shah Alam bound only.
Petaling	Puncak Perdana			6A	Puncak Perdana; Puncak Perdana (East) I/S	Persiaran Pulau Angsa (North) – Sunway Alam Suria; Damansara–Shah Alam Elevated Expressway – Penchala, Kota Damansara, Subang Persiaran Pulau Angsa (South) – Bandar Nusa Rhu, Universiti Teknologi MARA (UiTM) Puncak Perdana Campus U-Turn Flyover – Bandar Nusa Rhu, Universiti Teknologi MARA (UiTM) Puncak Perdana Campus	LILO Junctions, Shah Alam bound only LILO junction, Puncak Alam bound only U-Turn from Puncak Alam/Meru bound.
Petaling	Puncak Perdana			5A	Puncak Perdana–DASH I/C	Damansara–Shah Alam Elevated Expressway – Penchala, Kota Damansara, Subang	Semi-directional T interchange
Petaling	Subang			5	Cahaya SPK I/C	Cahaya SPK	Interchange with special ramp to Cahaya SPK
Petaling	Subang			4	Bukit Bayu I/S	Bukit Bayu, Subang Impian	LILO junction, from Shah Alam only, Entry to Puncak Alam, Meru
Petaling	Subang			3	Kayangan Heights I/S	Kayangan Heights	LILO junction, from Puncak Alam, Meru only, Entry to Shah Alam
Petaling	Subang			2	Sunway Kayangan I/S	Sunway Kayangan	Diamond interchange
Petaling	Bukit Jelutong				GCE Ramp		Ramp off the Expressway
Petaling	Bukit Jelutong			GCE Crossing Bridge			
Petaling	Bukit Jelutong	0.0	0.0	1	Subang–Bukit Jelutong I/S	FT 287 / B9 Malaysia Federal Route 287 – Sungai Buloh, Subang, Kampung Melayu Subang, Bukit Jelutong; Guthrie Corridor Expressway – Rawang, Ipoh, Batu Tiga, Shah Alam, Puchong, Klang, Kuala Lumpur International Airport (KLIA), Johor Bahru	Flyover to Shah Alam, Kuala Lumpur/South. T-junction to Sungai Buloh only
1.000 mi = 1.609 km; 1.000 km = 0.621 mi: Incomplete access; Route transition
