= Damansara–Shah Alam Elevated Expressway =

Road in Malaysia

Expressway 31
- Damansara–Shah Alam Elevated Expressway
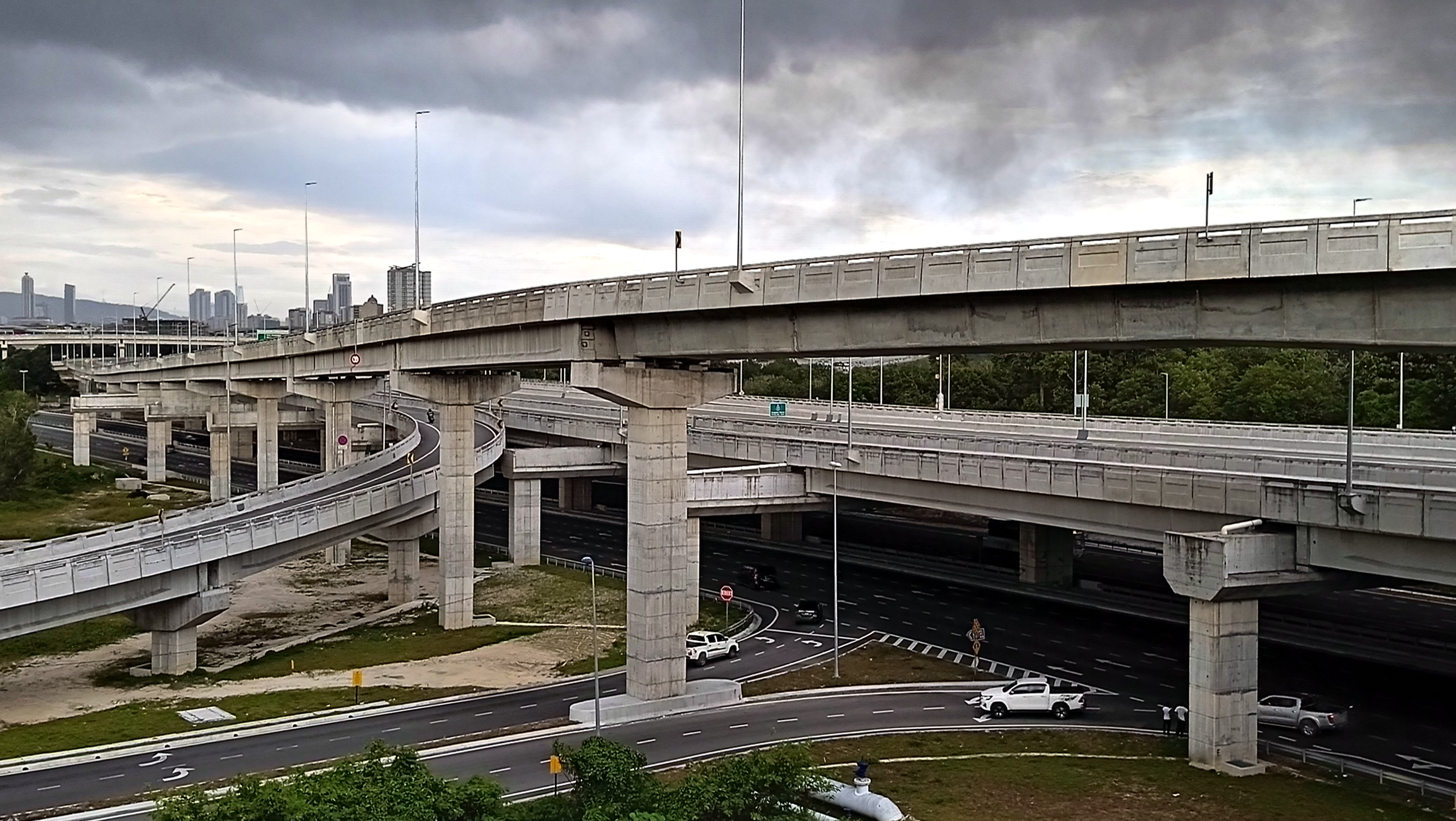
- Subang Airport and RRIM (Kwasa Damansara) Interchange of DASH from Star Avenue Lifestyle Mall, Shah Alam.

Route information
- Maintained by Prolintas with its subsidiary Projek Lintasan Damansara-Shah Alam Sdn Bhd (DASH)
- Existed: 2015–present
- History: Completed in 2022

Major junctions
- West end: Puncak Perdana
- East end: Penchala Interchange

Location
- Country: Malaysia
- Primary destinations: Kota Damansara, Subang, Sultan Abdul Aziz Shah Airport

Highway system
- Highways in Malaysia; Expressways; Federal; State

The Damansara–Shah Alam Elevated Expressway (DASH) (Malay: Lebuhraya Bertingkat Damansara–Shah Alam; Chinese: 白沙罗–莎阿南高架大道) E31 (or New North Klang Valley Expressway) is an expressway in Klang Valley, Selangor, Malaysia. Estimated cost of the expressway is MYR 11.5 billion.

== Route background ==
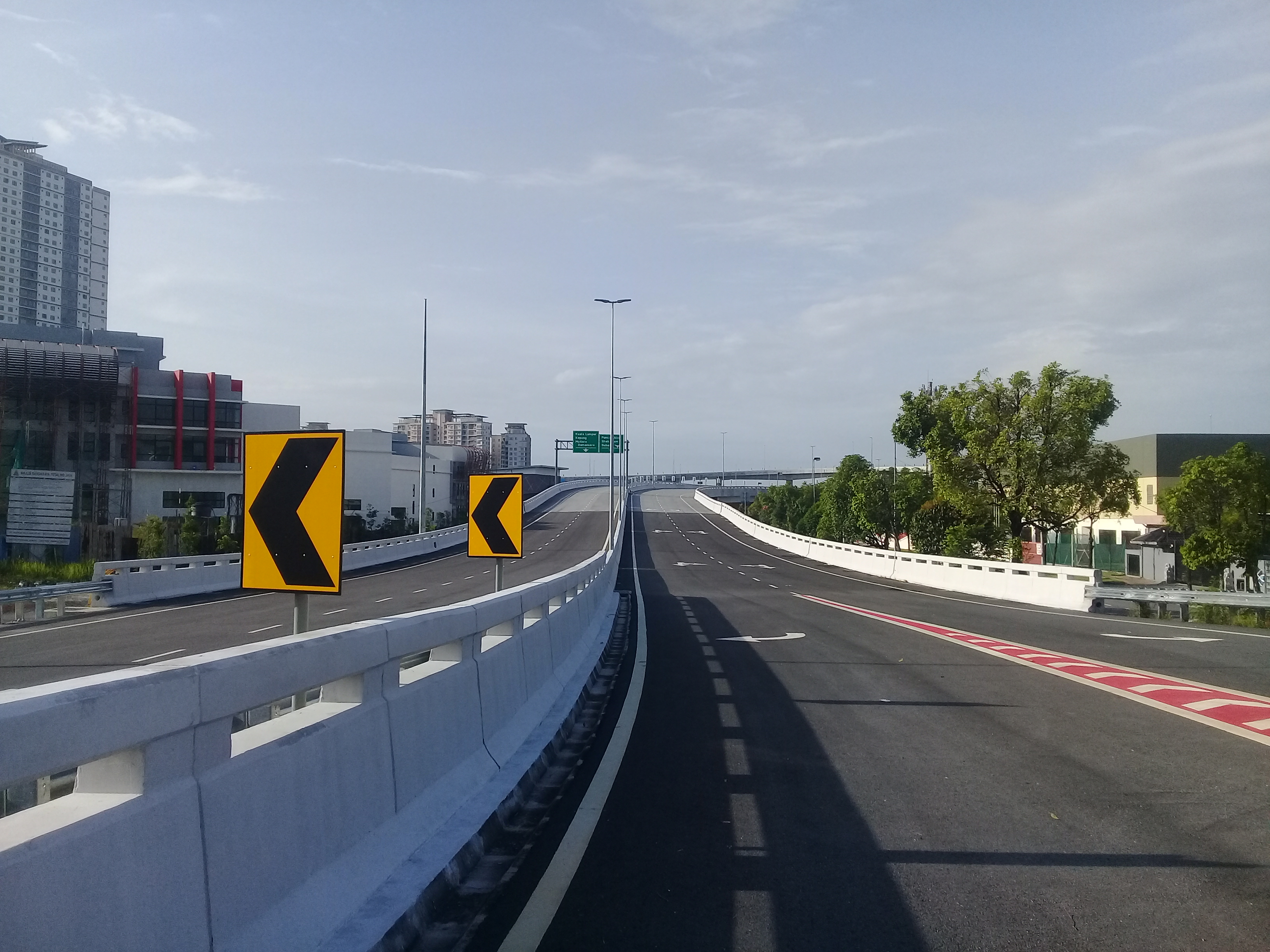
Surian Interchange.

The zeroth kilometre is located at the Puncak Perdana U10 Shah Alam interchange. It acts a link for Puncak Perdana, Alam Suria, Denai Alam, Kampung Melayu Subang, Jalan Sungai Buloh, RRIM, Kota Damansara, Damansara Perdana and Mutiara Damansara. The expressway ends at the Penchala interchange, linking it to the Damansara–Puchong and Sprint Expressways.

Interchanges include Puncak Perdana, Alam Suria, Denai Alam, Kampung Melayu Subang, Galaksi, Subang 2, LTSAAS, RRIM, Surian, Kenanga, Mutiara Damansara and Penchala.

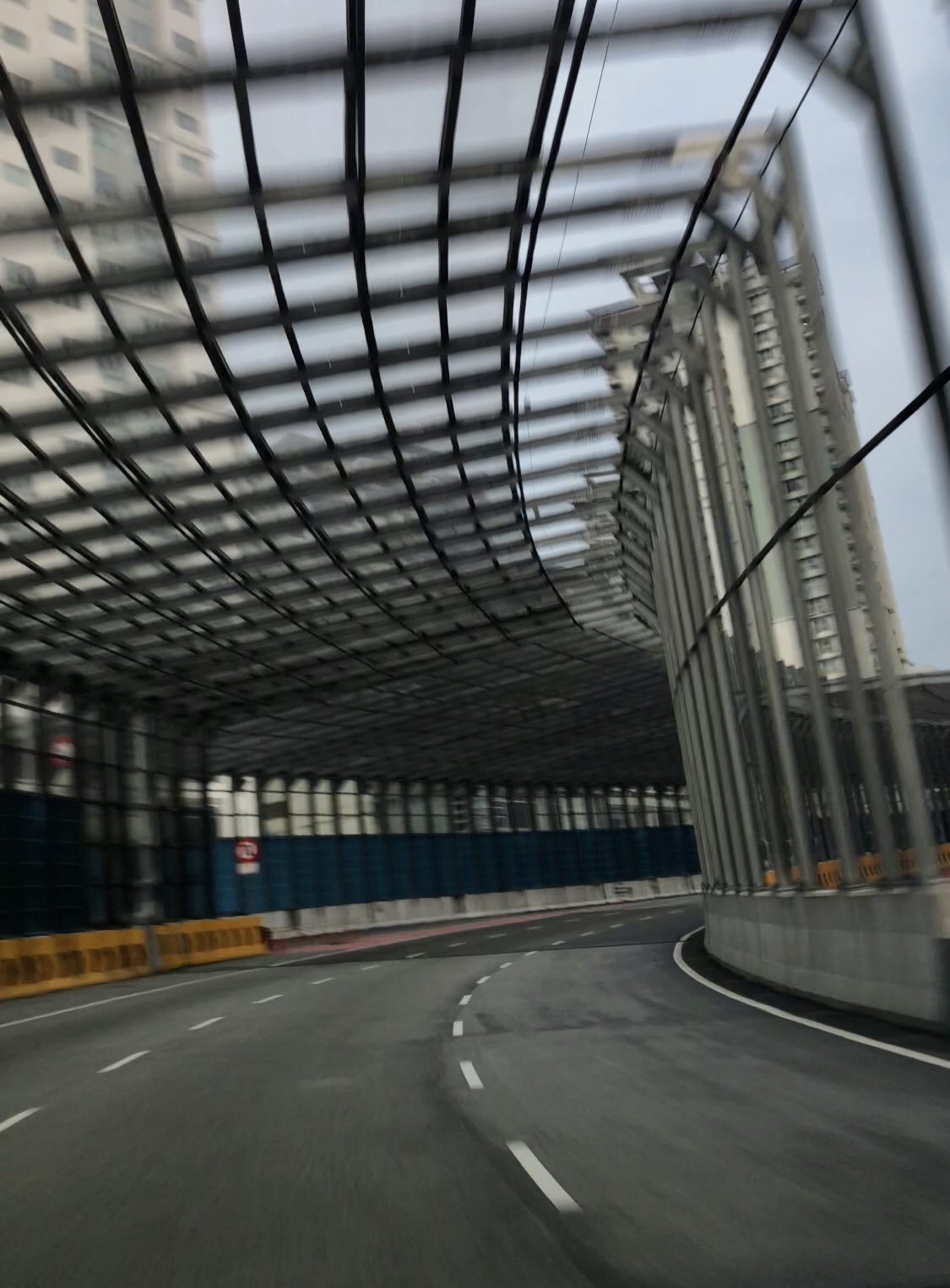
DASH Highway at Mutiara Damansara section going into a full-enclosure noise barrier tunnel.

== History ==
The increasing development along the links of Shah Alam and Jalan Batu Arang (Persiaran Mokhtar Dahari) facilitated the need of increasing road capacity. So, Prolintas proposed that the expressway to be built to meet these requirements. It would not only serve as an alternative route for Persiaran Surian in Kota Damansara and to the Subang Airport, but also act as a link between east and west of Klang Valley, thus crossing over the New Klang Valley Expressway, and linking existing expressways such as the Guthrie Corridor Expressway, LDP and SPRINT. In addition, the expressway will solve congestion to the existing routes caused by the development at the Rubber Research Institute of Malaysia's land in the area.

PROLINTAS held the expressway's opening ceremony at Denai Alam toll plaza on 13 October 2022, and the expressway was opened to traffic on 14 October 2022, at 12:01 AM (MST). The toll were free of charge from the officially opened date until 30 November 2022 The project was allocated RM4.2 billion in the Budget 2015.

== Incidents ==
- 19 June 2021 – While the expressway was under construction, a stop-work order had been issued immediately following an incident which occurred above the New Klang Valley Expressway's Kota Damansara Interchange 107. The incident involved a metal scaffolding that fell off a dozen-meter high pillar, injuring two Bangladeshi workers. The injured workers were rushed to Sungai Buloh Hospital for treatment, unfortunately one of them died on the following day. Since the crash occurred in a closed area, no motorists were injured.
- 20 October 2022 – A food delivery motorcyclist was killed after his motorcycle skidded and crashed into a highway divider through the full-enclosure noise barriers westbound from Penchala Interchange. The victim was taken to University Malaya Medical Centre for post-mortem.
- 25 February 2025 – A 30-year-old female motorcyclist collided with a car and was flung from a height of 30 to 35 metres into the Penchala River. She was pronounced dead at the scene.
- 24 July 2025 – A 23-year-old man was killed after his motorcycle skidded and plunged approximately 21 metres onto a grassy area along Persiaran Pulau Angsa.
- 23 August 2025 – A 19-year-old culinary student died from a severe head injury after his motorcycle crashed into a barrier and fell at the same location where the previous accident occurred on 24 July.

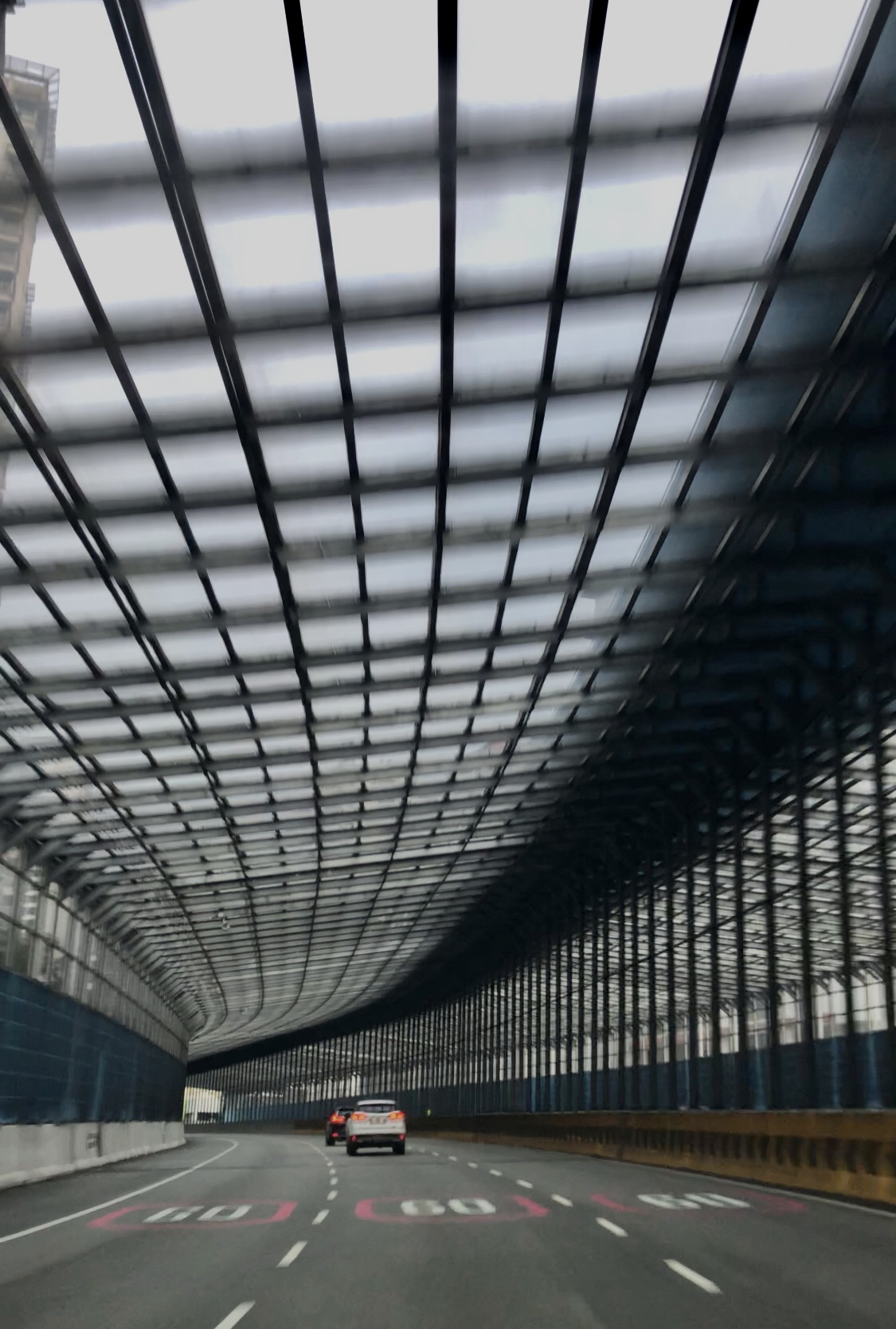
DASH Highway heading towards Penchala interchange with the Sprint Expressway and Damansara–Puchong Expressway inside a fully-enclosure noise barrier tunnel

== Tolls ==
DASH adopts an open toll system.

=== Electronic Toll Collections (ETC) ===
As part of an initiative to facilitate faster transactions at the Kota Damansara, Kwasa Damansara and Denai Alam Toll Plazas, all toll transactions at these three toll plazas on DASH are conducted electronically via Touch 'n Go cards or SmartTAGs beginning 1 December 2022.

=== Toll rates ===
There are three toll plazas along DASH, namely, Denai Alam, RRIM (Kwasa Damansara) and Kota Damansara, each charging at the same rate.

(Starting 1 December 2022)

Class	Type of vehicles	Rate (in Malaysian Ringgit (RM))
0	Motorcycles	Free
1	Vehicles with 2 axles and 3 or 4 wheels excluding taxis	RM 2.30
2	Vehicles with 2 axles and 5 or 6 wheels excluding buses	RM 4.60
3	Vehicles with 3 or more axles	RM 6.90
4	Taxis	RM 1.20
5	Buses	RM 2.30

== Junction lists ==
The entire expressway is located in Petaling District, Selangor.

=== Main Link ===
Location	km	mi	Exit	Name	Destinations	Notes
Puncak Perdana	0.0	0.0	3101	Puncak Perdana Interchange	B49 Persiaran Mokhtar Dahari – Kuala Selangor, Batu Arang, Setia Alam, Meru, Puncak Alam, Bukit Jelutong, Shah Alam, Klang, Kuala Lumpur International Airport (KLIA), Johor Bahru	Semi directional-T interchange
Puncak Perdana			3102	Alam Suria Interchange	Jalan Pulau Angsa – Sunway Alam Suria, Perdana Heights, Puncak Perdana, UiTM Puncak Perdana Campus	Half diamond interchange Eastbound entrance and westbound exit only
Denai Alam			Denai Alam RSA (both directions; separated)			
Denai Alam			Denai Alam Toll Plaza			
Denai Alam			3104	Denai Alam Interchange	Guthrie Corridor Expressway – Ipoh, Kuala Selangor, Rawang, Shah Alam, Klang, Kuala Lumpur International Airport (KLIA), Seremban, Johor Bahru; Persiaran Elektron – Bukit Subang, Denai Alam	Half cloverleaf interchange Eastbound exits and westbound entrance only
Subang			3105	Kampung Melayu Subang Interchange	FT 15 Jalan Sungai Buloh – Kampung Melayu Subang, Bandar Pinggiran Subang	Eastbound exit and westbound entrance only
Subang			3106	Subang Airport Interchange	FT 15 Jalan Sungai Buloh – Subang 2	Westbound entrance only from Jalan Sungai Buloh
Subang				RRIM Toll Plaza Interchange	Surian Interchange	Eastbound exit and westbound entrance only
Subang			3107		FT 15 Jalan Sungai Buloh – Kwasa Damansara	Westbound exit and eastbound entrance only
Damansara			3108	Surian Interchange	Persiaran Surian – Jalan Teknologi, Taman Sains Selangor, Kota Damansara, Sunway Damansara	Semi directional-T Interchange
Damansara			3108A	Seksyen 5, Kota Damansara Interchange	Persiaran Kenanga – Kota Damansara; New Klang Valley Expressway / AH2 – Ipoh, Kuala Lumpur, Klang, Kuala Lumpur International Airport (KLIA), Johor Bahru	Eastbound entrance only from west
Damansara			3109	Sunway Damansara Interchange	Persiaran Mahogani – Kota Damansara, Desa Temuan	Eastbound entrance from north and westbound exit to south only
Damansara			Kota Damansara Toll Plaza			
Damansara			3109A	Damansara Perdana Interchange	Jalan PJU 8/1 – Damansara, Bukit Lanjan	Eastbound entrance only
Damansara			3110	Penchala Interchange	Diamond Interchange; Jalan PJU 7/9, Jalan PJU 8/1; Stacked Interchange; Sprint Expressway (Penchala Link) – Taman Tun Dr Ismail, Mont Kiara, Kuala Lumpur, Ipoh, Ampang, Genting Highlands, Kuantan; Damansara–Puchong Expressway – Kepong, Sungai Buloh, Bandar Sri Damansara, Petaling Jaya, Puchong, Putrajaya, Cyberjaya, Sungai Besi	Stacked expressway interchange (Dubbed as the Spaghetti junction)
1.000 mi = 1.609 km; 1.000 km = 0.621 mi: Electronic toll collection; Incomplete access

=== Kampung Melayu–Kota Damansara Link ===
Location	km	mi	Exit	Name	Destinations	Notes
Subang				Pinggiran Subang Interchange	Bandar Pinggiran Subang	Eastbound entrance from Jalan Sungai Buloh and Persiaran Galaksi
Subang				Jalan Sungai Buloh Entrance		Eastbound entrance from Jalan Sungai Buloh only
Subang			3106	Subang Airport Interchange	FT 15 Sultan Abdul Aziz Shah Airport Highway – Sultan Abdul Aziz Shah Airport, Ara Damansara, Petaling Jaya, Subang Jaya, Bandar Pinggiran Subang, Kampung Melayu Subang, Denai Alam	Stack Interchange; Eastbound entrances (including from Persiaran Cakerawala) and westbound exits only
Subang			3107	Kwasa Damansara Interchange	FT 15 Batu Tiga–Sungai Buloh Highway – Sungai Buloh, Kuala Selangor, Kepong	Eastbound entrance and westbound exit only
Subang				RRIM Toll Plaza Interchange	Main Link – Puncak Alam, Meru, Shah Alam	Eastbound entrance and westbound exit only
Subang			RRIM (Kwasa Damansara) L/B (westbound)			
Subang			Tri–Complex Administrative Building (eastbound)			
Subang			RRIM (Kwasa Damansara) Toll Plaza			
Subang			RRIM (Kwasa Damansara) L/B (eastbound)			
Subang				RRIM Toll Plaza Interchange	Main Link – Mont Kiara, Kepong, Kuala Lumpur	Eastbound exit and westbound entrance only
Subang				U–Turn	Sungai Buloh, Sultan Abdul Aziz Shah Airport	Eastbound only
Subang					Main Link – Damansara Perdana, Kepong, Kuala Lumpur	Southwest bound exit and northeast bound entrance bound only
Subang			3108	Surian Interchange	Persiaran Surian – Jalan Teknologi, Taman Sains Selangor, Kota Damansara, Sunway Damansara	Semi directional-T Interchange; For 3108B, vehicles exceeding 5.4 meters in height are not allowed to access the exit
1.000 mi = 1.609 km; 1.000 km = 0.621 mi: Electronic toll collection; Incomplete access

== Gallery ==
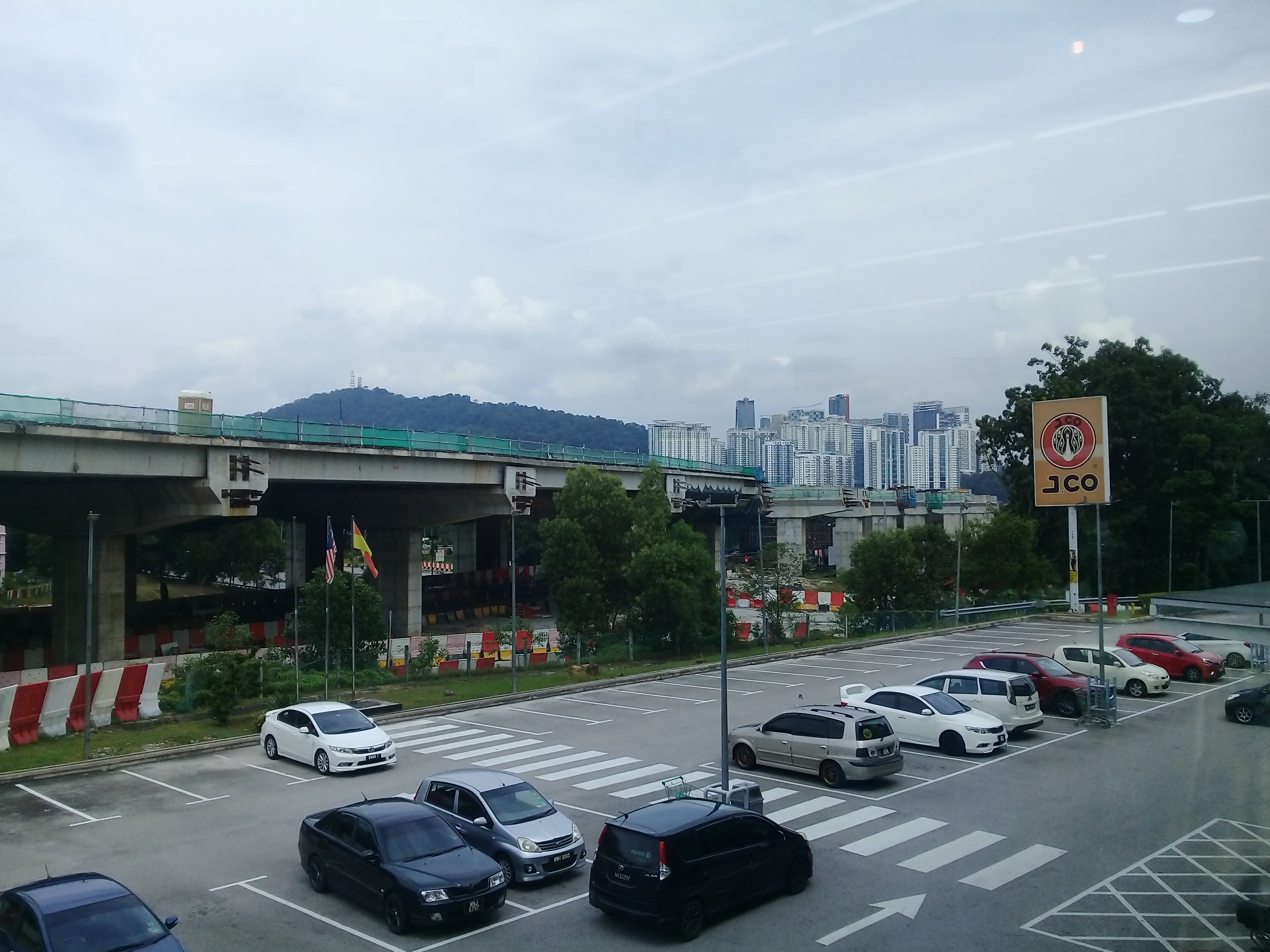
Highway construction to the east.

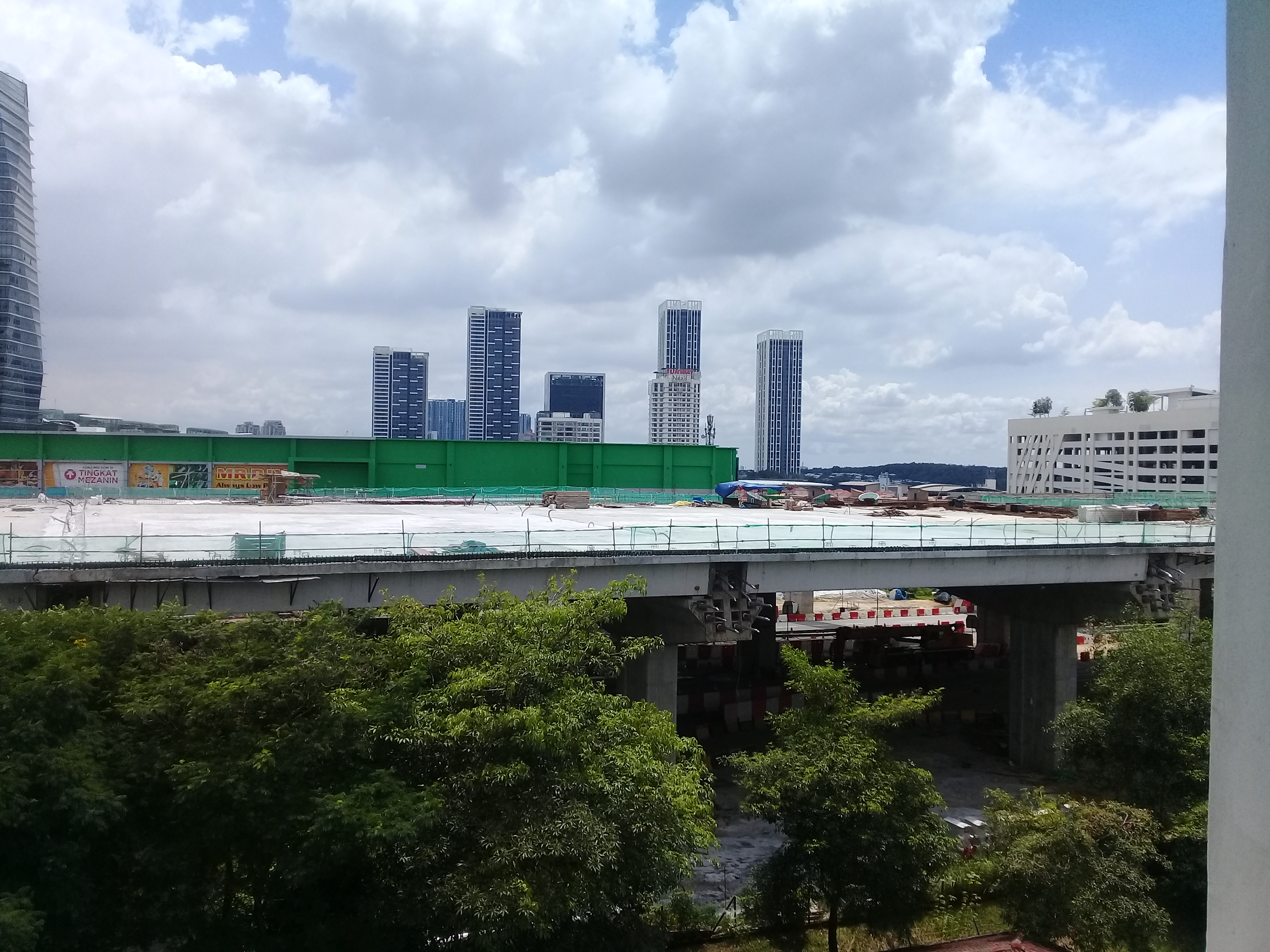
DASH Highway in Section 5 of Kota Damansara.

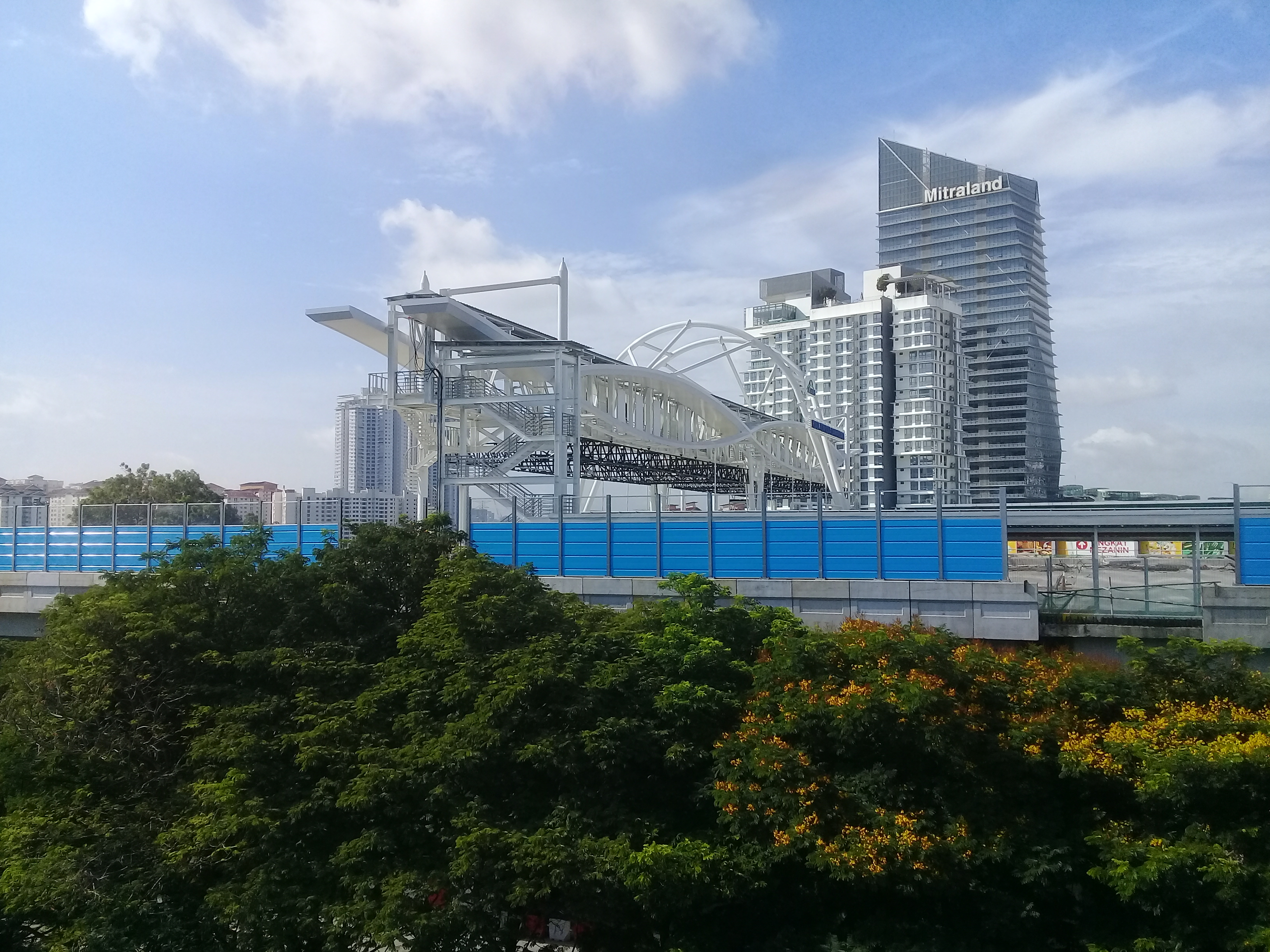
Kota Damansara Toll Plaza (previously Mutiara Damansara Toll Plaza).

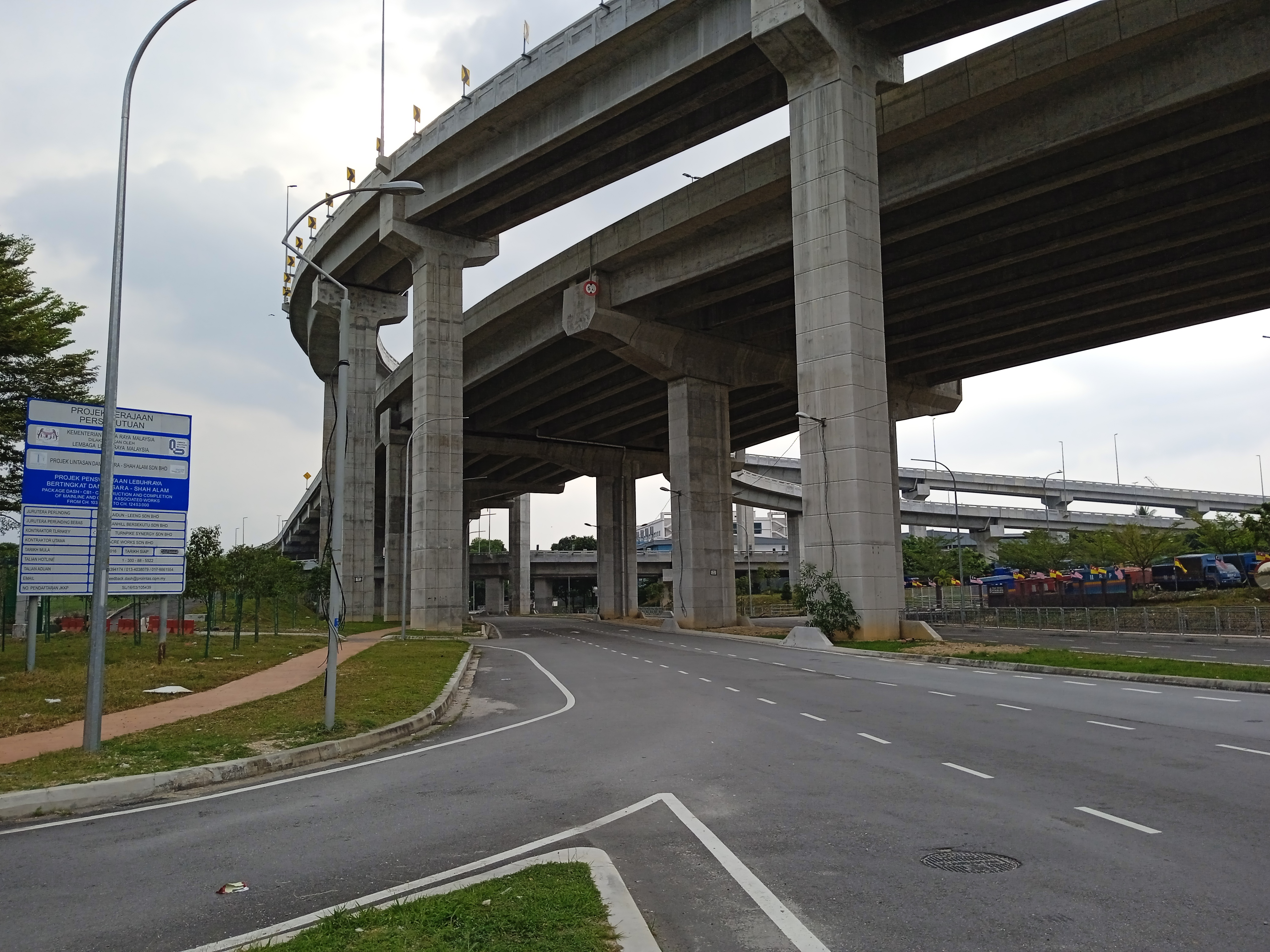
DASH Expressway in Section 2, Kota Damansara.

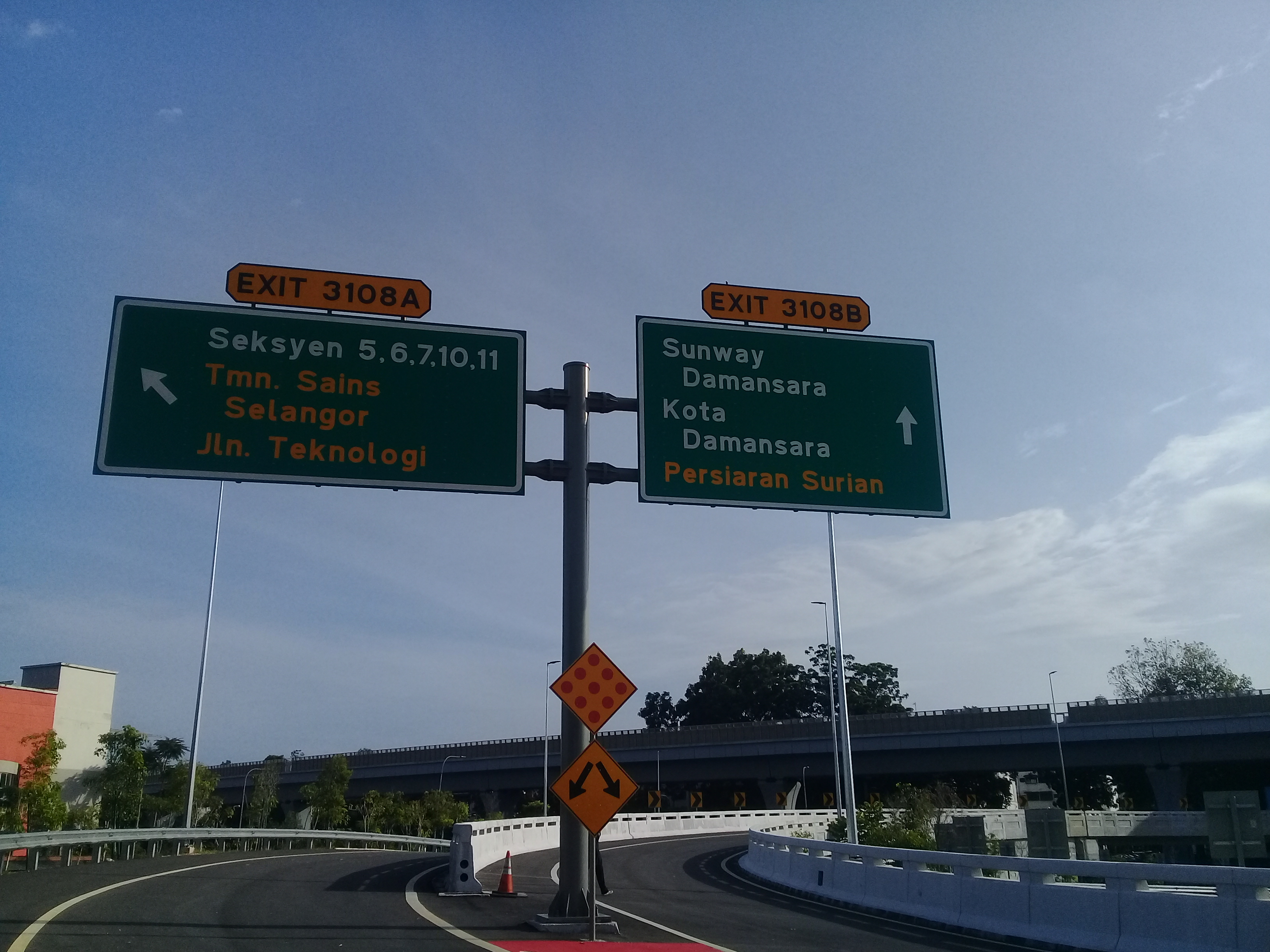
Road junction sign at Surian Interchange.

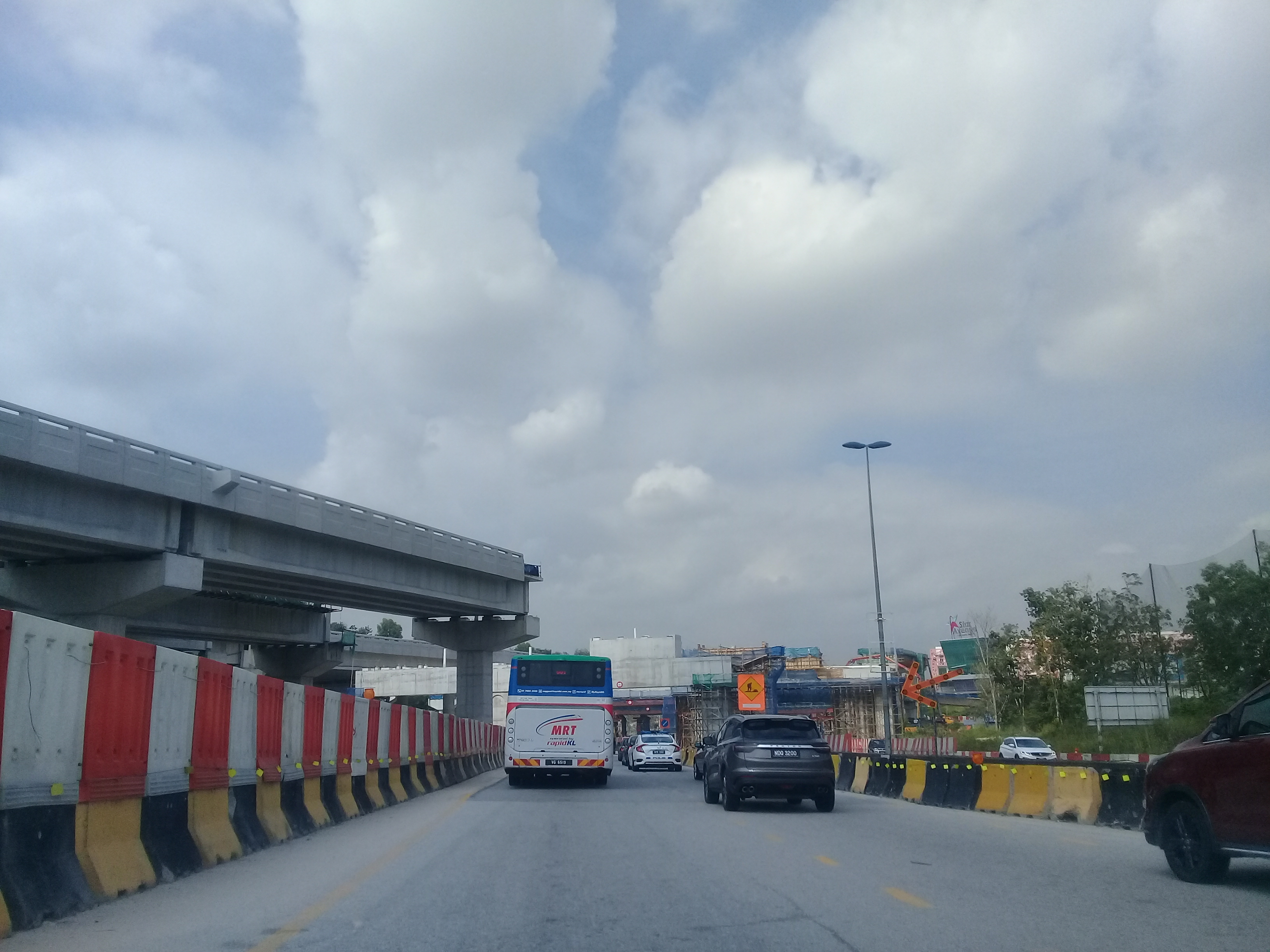
Subang Airport Interchange.

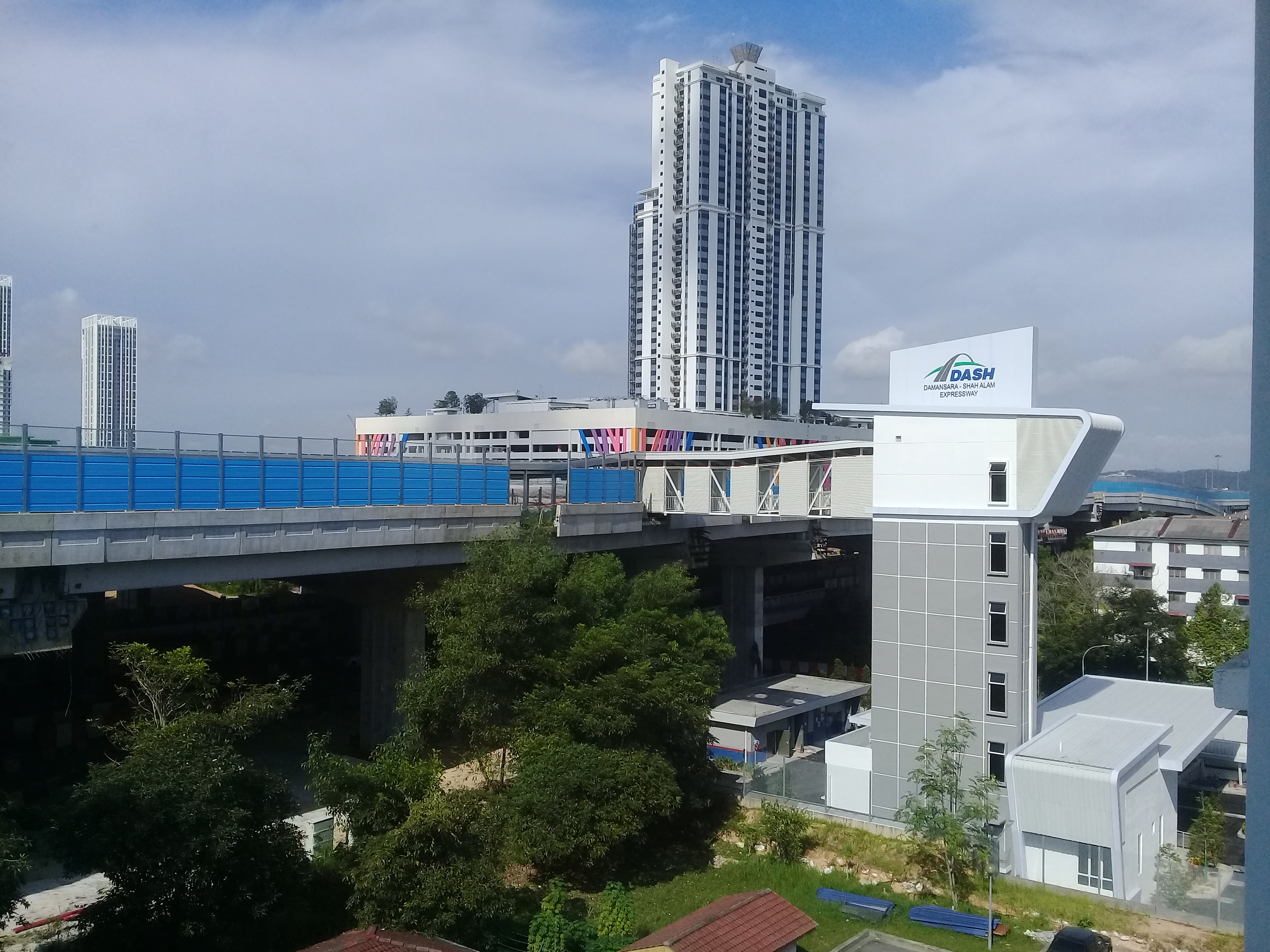
Toll Plaza Provisional Building along Jalan PJU 5/1 southbound.

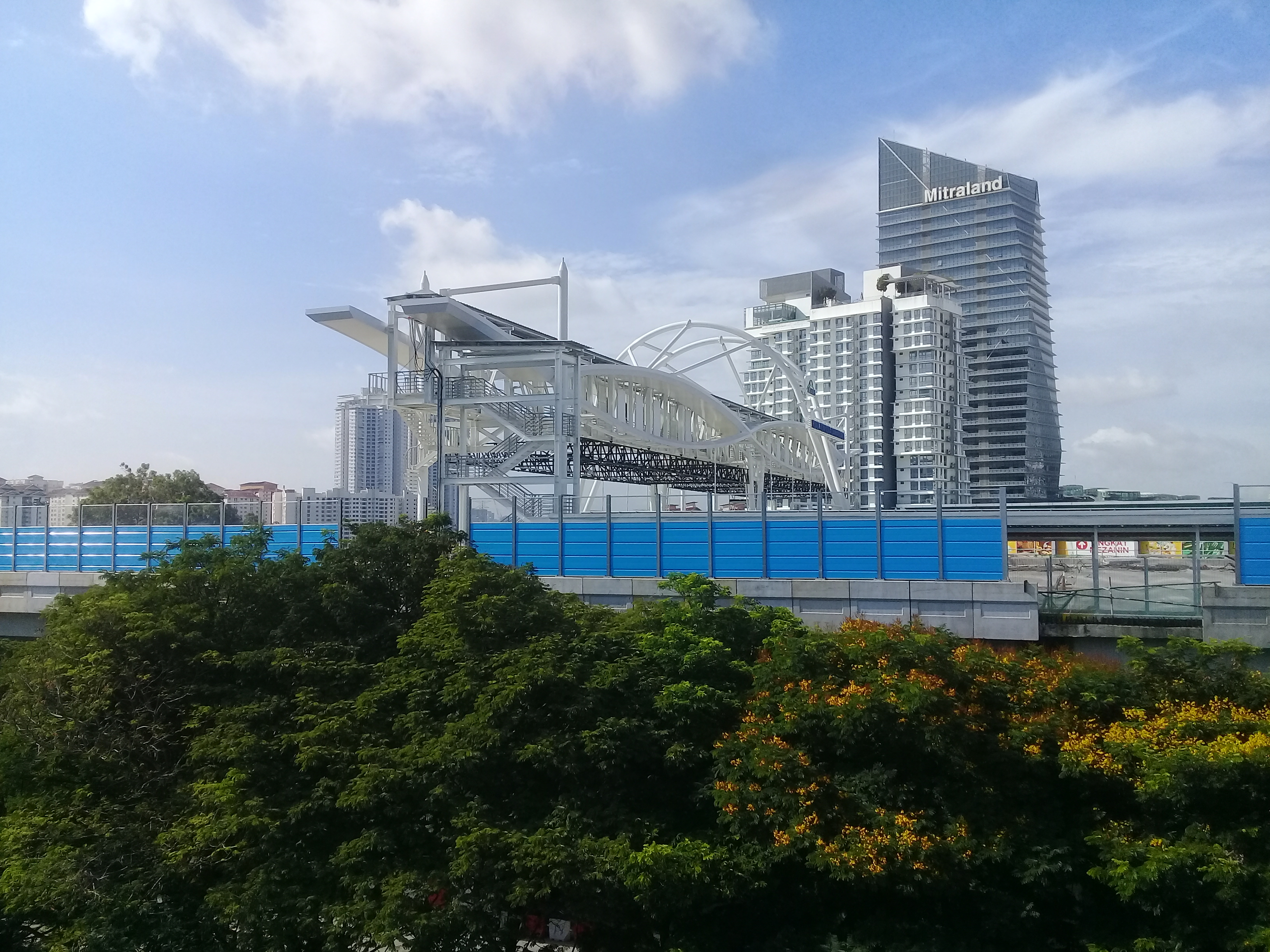
View of DASH Kota Damansara Toll Plaza from Salvia Apartment
