= Guthrie Corridor Expressway =

Expressway in Malaysia

Expressway 35
- Guthrie Corridor Expressway; Lebuhraya Koridor Guthrie 牙直利走廊大道
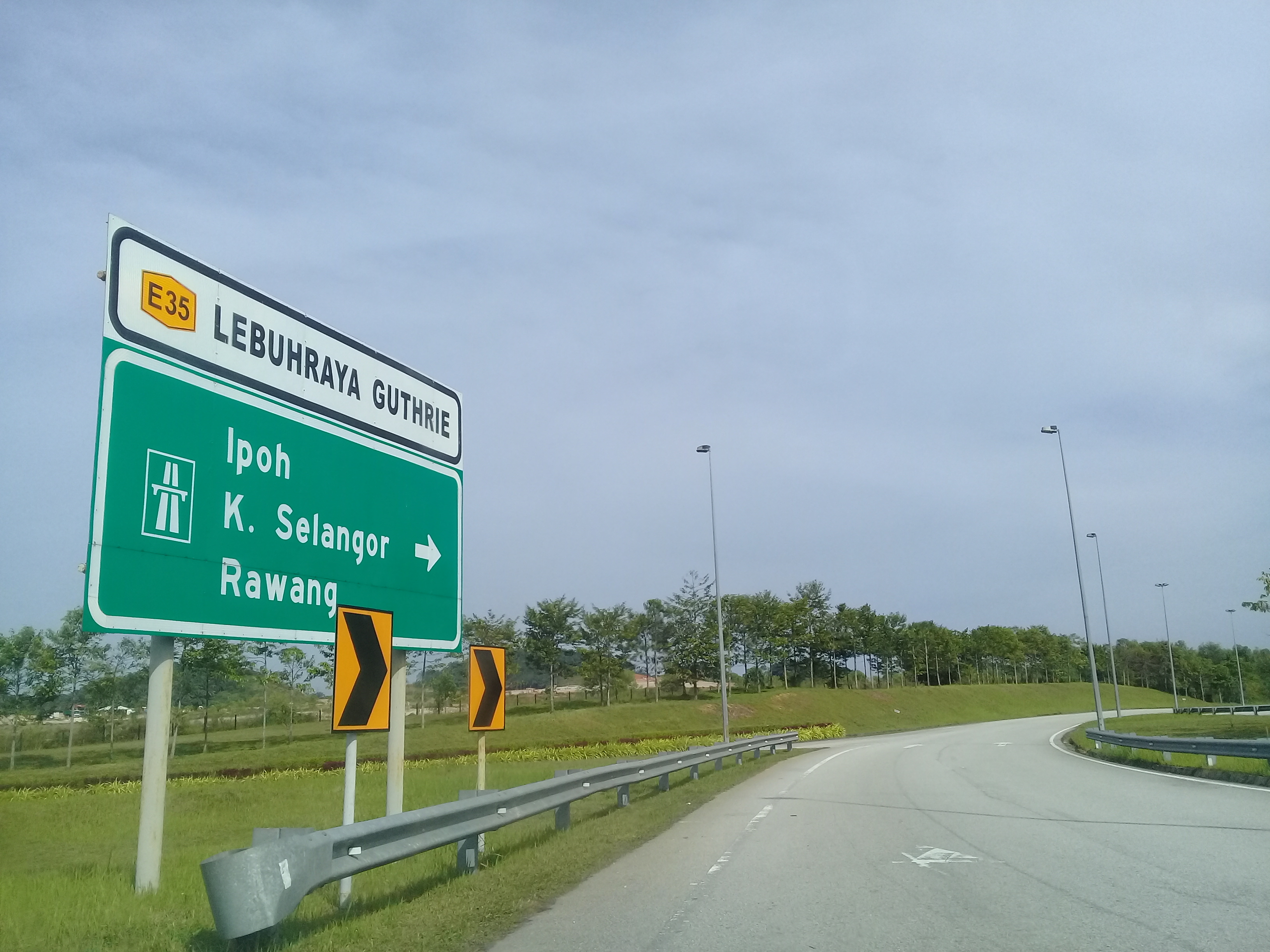
- Entering the highway via Elmina Interchange.

Route information
- Maintained by Prolintas with its subsidiary Prolintas Expressway Sdn Bhd (PEX)
- Length: 25 km (16 mi)
- Existed: 2003–present
- History: Completed in 2005

Major junctions
- North end: Rawang
- North–South Expressway Northern Route / AH2; Kuala Lumpur–Kuala Selangor Expressway; FT 54 Federal Route 54; Damansara–Shah Alam Elevated Expressway; North–South Expressway Central Link / AH2 New Klang Valley Expressway / AH2 / AH141; FT 287 Federal Route 287; FT 286 Federal Route 286
- South end: Shah Alam

Location
- Country: Malaysia
- Primary destinations: Shah Alam, Klang, Rawang, Kuang, Lagong, Paya Jaras, Sungai Buloh, Subang, Bukit Jelutong

Highway system
- Highways in Malaysia; Expressways; Federal; State

E35 Guthrie Corridor Expressway, GCE, (Malay: Lebuhraya Koridor Guthrie; Chinese: 牙直利走廊大道) is an expressway in Klang Valley, Selangor, Malaysia. It connects Shah Alam to Rawang. GCE is approximately 25 km (16 mi) (23 km (14 mi)) long on the Prolintas sections and 2 km (1.2 mi) on the PLUS Expressway sections).

Named after the corridor of estates where 80 percent of the land acquired was from the plantation company Guthrie Berhad (later merged in 2007 with two other two other companies to form Sime Darby), all project costs, including land acquisition of the expressway, were completely borne by the concessionaire. Today this expressway is owned by Prolintas and its subsidiary Prolintas Expressway Sdn Bhd.

The starting point of the highway or 'Kilometre Zero' is located at the Jalan Monfort intersection near Shah Alam.

== History ==
Plans to build the 30 km-long expressway, named after Kumpulan Guthrie's corridor of estates in Selangor, began in late 1996. The expressway would be a way to speed up and link various developments around the corridor, including the Lagong satellite city and the Bukit Jelutong township. The construction of the expressway would cost between RM 300 million and RM 450 million and would be completed in three to four years. Kumpulan Guthrie had submitted an application to the federal government and was still negotiating with the Selangor state government.

The proposal was revived in 2002 when Guthrie Berhad became a major shareholder of this project, apart from owning other businesses such as large plantations and property development projects. Construction started in 2003 and was completed in April 2005. It commenced operations in July that year.

In August 2007, GCE became a subsidiary of Prolintas Expressway Sdn Bhd, which is ultimately owned by PNB.

On 17 August 2023, a private plane carrying Pahang State Legislative Assembly member Johari Harun and seven other passengers crashed onto the highway, just outside the Elmina interchange. There were ten fatalities, including the passengers and two motorists.

== Features ==
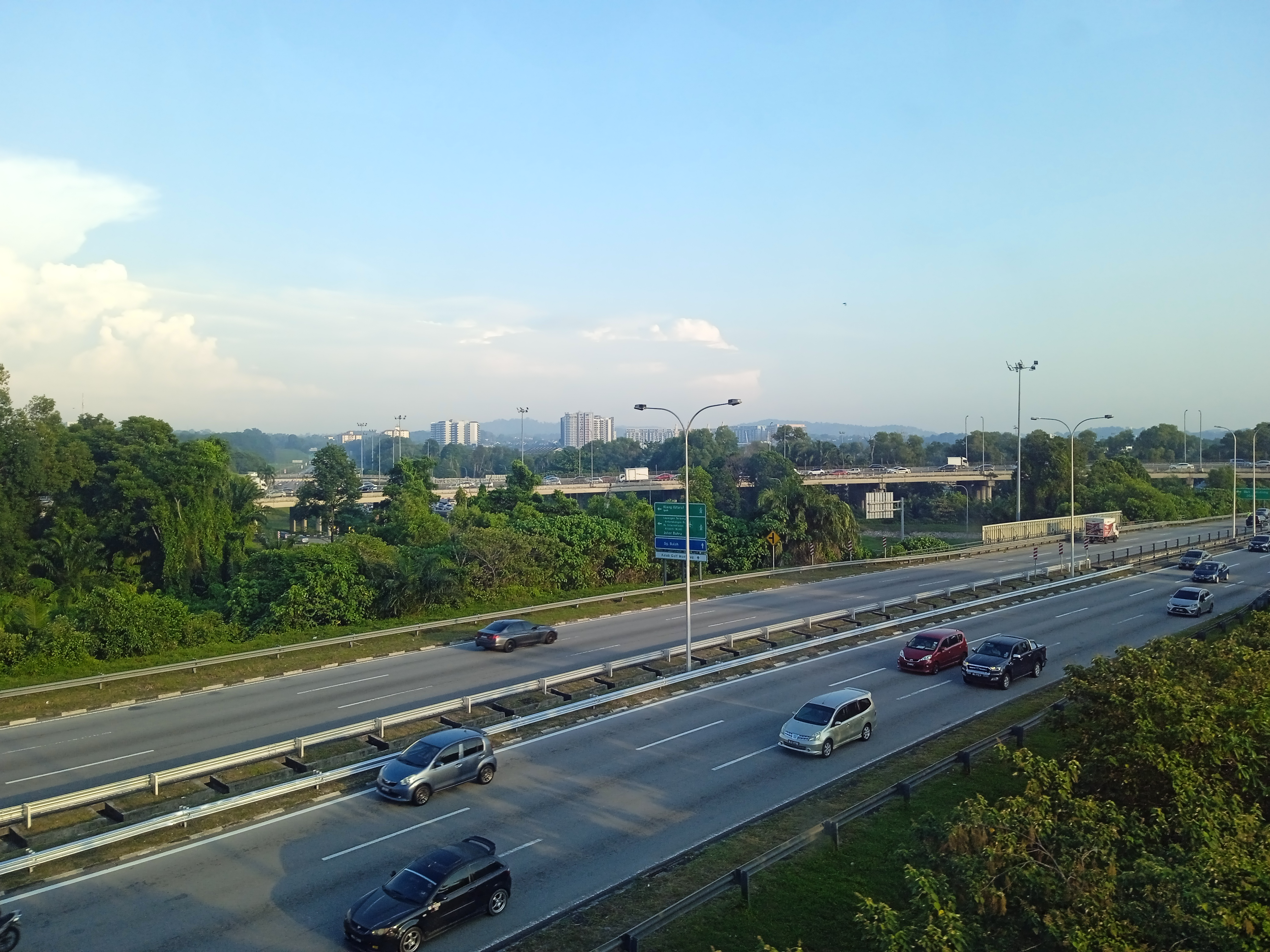
GCE view from ELITE ramp.

- Smooth access from Shah Alam to northern states without being trapped in common traffic jams in the New Klang Valley Expressway (NKVE).
- Many oil palm estates with property development potential along this expressway.
- Motorcycle lane, including a southbound flyover which passes above the Denai Alam exit, built as part of the DASH Highway construction project.
- SOS emergency.
- Competitive toll rate.
- Speed limits are 90 km/h–110 km/h
- Several rest areas (R&R) near toll plazas with free Wi-Fi
- Malaysian Road Transport Department (JPJ) Enforcement Stations

=== Speed limits ===
The speed limits for majority sections of GCE are 90 km/h–110 km/h, including the speed limits as below

- Rawang South Interchange–Elmina – 110 km/h
- Bukit Subang Interchange–Bukit Jelutong – 90 km/h
- Approaching toll plaza – 60 km/h

== Tolls ==
GCE adopts an open toll system.

=== Electronic Toll Collections (ETC) ===
As part of an initiative to facilitate faster transactions at the Bukit Jelutong, Elmina and Lagong Toll Plazas, all toll transactions at these three toll plazas on GCE are conducted electronically via Touch 'n Go cards or SmartTAGs beginning 2 March 2016.

=== Toll rates ===
There are three toll plazas along GCE, each charging the same rate. In October 2022, it was one of the four expressways maintained by PROLINTAS to have its toll rates deducted between 8% and 15%.

(Starting 20 October 2022)

Class	Type of vehicles	Rate (in Malaysian Ringgit (RM))
0	Motorcycles	Free
1	Vehicles with 2 axles and 3 or 4 wheels excluding taxis	1.75
2	Vehicles with 2 axles and 5 or 6 wheels excluding buses	3.80
3	Vehicles with 3 or more axles	5.70
4	Taxis	0.83
5	Buses	1.29

=== Toll Name ===
Abbreviation	Name
RWS	Rawang South
LGG	Lagong
ELM	Elmina
BKJ	Bukit Jelutong

== Interchange lists ==
Below is a list of interchanges (exits), laybys and rest and service areas along GCE. The exits are arranged in ascending numerical order from North to South. The entire route is located in Selangor.

Legend:

- I/C - Interchange, I/S - Intersection, RSA - Rest and service area, OBR - Overhead bridge restaurant, R/R - Restaurant and rest plaza, L/B - Layby, V/P - Vista point, TN - tunnel, T/P - Toll plaza, BR - Bridge
- C - Cloverleaf, S - Stack, T-A - Trumpet-A, T-B - Trumpet-B, DT - Directional-T/Y, SDT - Semi-Directional-T/Y, P-Y - Partial-Y, D - Diamond, P-C - Partial cloverleaf, D-D - Diverging diamond, D-R - Direct ramp

District	Location	km	mi	Exit	Name	Destinations	Notes
Gombak	Rawang South	25.0	15.5	115	Rawang South I/C	North–South Expressway Northern Route / AH2 – Kuala Lumpur, Rawang, Ipoh, Penang, Alor Setar	
Gombak	Rawang South			Rawang South Toll Plaza			
Gombak	Rawang South			3501	Kuang I/C	Kuala Lumpur–Kuala Selangor Expressway – Lumut, Sabak Bernam, Sungai Besar, Sekinchan, Tanjung Karang, Kuala Selangor, Ijok, Puncak Alam, Serendah, Rawang, Selayang, Batu Caves, Kuala Lumpur; B29 Jalan Lagong – Batu Arang, Kundang, Kundang Lake, Gamuda Gardens	
Gombak	Rawang South			Pipeline crossing bridge			
Gombak	Lagong			Lagong Toll Plaza			
Gombak	Lagong			3502	Lagong I/C	B25 Jalan Kuang – Lagong, Kuang	Planned
Gombak	Lagong			Sungai Kuang bridge			
Gombak	Elmina			3503	Paya Jaras I/C	FT 54 Jalan Kuala Selangor – Paya Jaras, Kuala Selangor, Sungai Buloh, Kepong, Bandar Sri Damansara	
Petaling	Elmina			Sungai Buloh bridge			
Petaling	Elmina			Elmina Toll Plaza			
Petaling	Elmina			Elmina RSA (northbound)			
Petaling	Elmina			JPJ Enforcement Station (both bounds; separated)			
Petaling	Elmina			3504	Elmina I/C	Persiaran Atmosfera – Elmina, Subang Bestari	
Petaling	Elmina			Elmina RSA (southbound)			
Petaling	Bukit Subang			3505	Bukit Subang I/C	FT 287 Jalan Subang–Batu Tiga – Bukit Subang, Subang, Sungai Buloh; Damansara–Shah Alam Elevated Expressway – Kuala Lumpur, Kota Damansara, Subang	
Petaling	Bukit Subang			3505A	Denai Alam I/C	Damansara–Shah Alam Elevated Expressway – Puncak Perdana, Puncak Alam, Meru	Exit from northbound only
Petaling	Bukit Subang			3506A	Jalan Batu Arang exit	B49 Persiaran Mokhtar Dahari – Puncak Alam, Batu Arang, Kuala Selangor	Exit from southbound only
Petaling	Bukit Jelutong			Bukit Jelutong Toll Plaza			
Petaling	Bukit Jelutong			3506	Bukit Jelutong North I/C	FT 287 Malaysia Federal Route 287 – Bukit Jelutong, Subang, Sungai Buloh, Batu Arang	No entry from northbound Northern terminus of concurrency with FT287
Petaling	Bukit Jelutong			3507	Bukit Jelutong Central I/C	B9 Jalan Montfort – Bukit Jelutong, Taman TTDI Jaya, Subang Air Force Base (TUDM Subang)	
Petaling	Bukit Jelutong			3508	Bukit Jelutong-NKVE I/C	New Klang Valley Expressway / AH2 / AH141 – Klang, Port Klang, Kuala Lumpur, Kuantan, Damansara; North–South Expressway Central Link / AH2 – Johor Bahru, Kuala Lumpur International Airport; Persiaran Astaka – Taman TTDI Jaya	
Petaling	Bukit Jelutong				Bukit Jelutong exit	Persiaran Gerbang Utama – Bukit Jelutong (Section U8)	Northbound
Petaling	Bukit Jelutong	0.0	0.0	Sungai Damansara bridge Southern terminus of concurrency with FT287			
Petaling	Bukit Jelutong	0.0	0.0	Through to FT 286 Malaysia Federal Route 286			
1.000 mi = 1.609 km; 1.000 km = 0.621 mi: Concurrency terminus; Electronic toll collection; Incomplete access; Route transition; Unopened

== Gallery ==
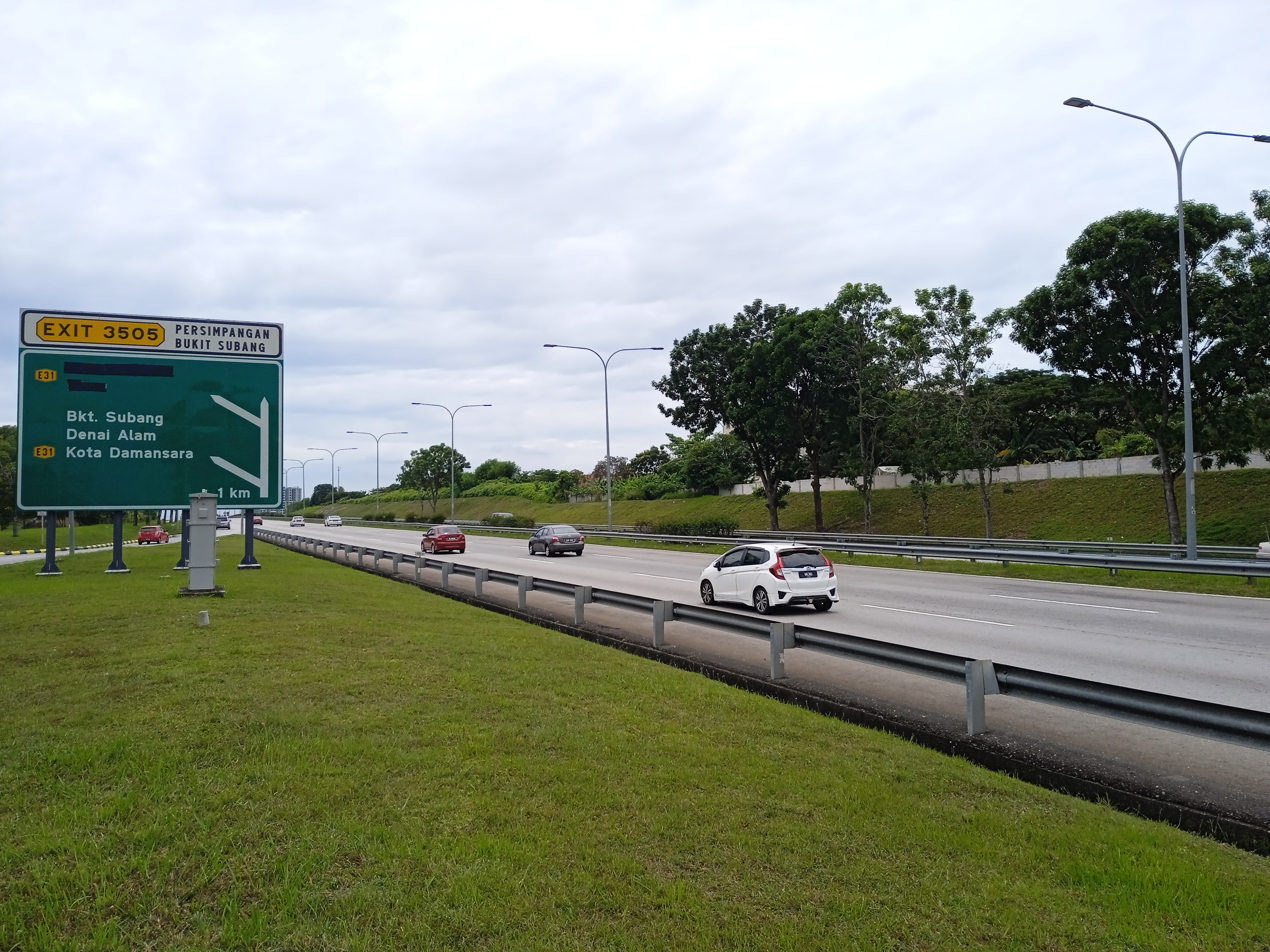
Bukit Subang Interchange sign near Elmina Rest Area Southbound.

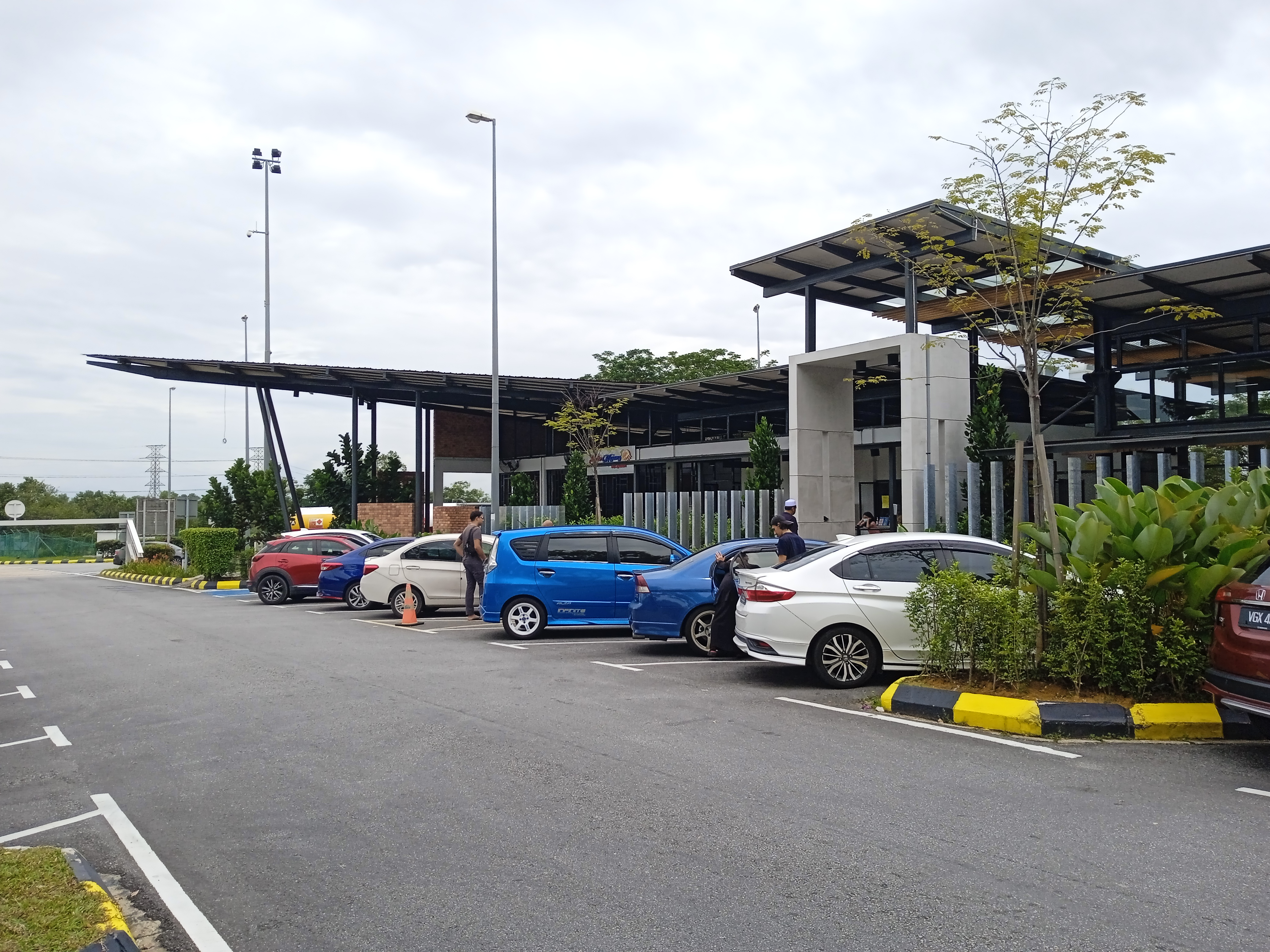
View of Elmina Rest Area Southbound.

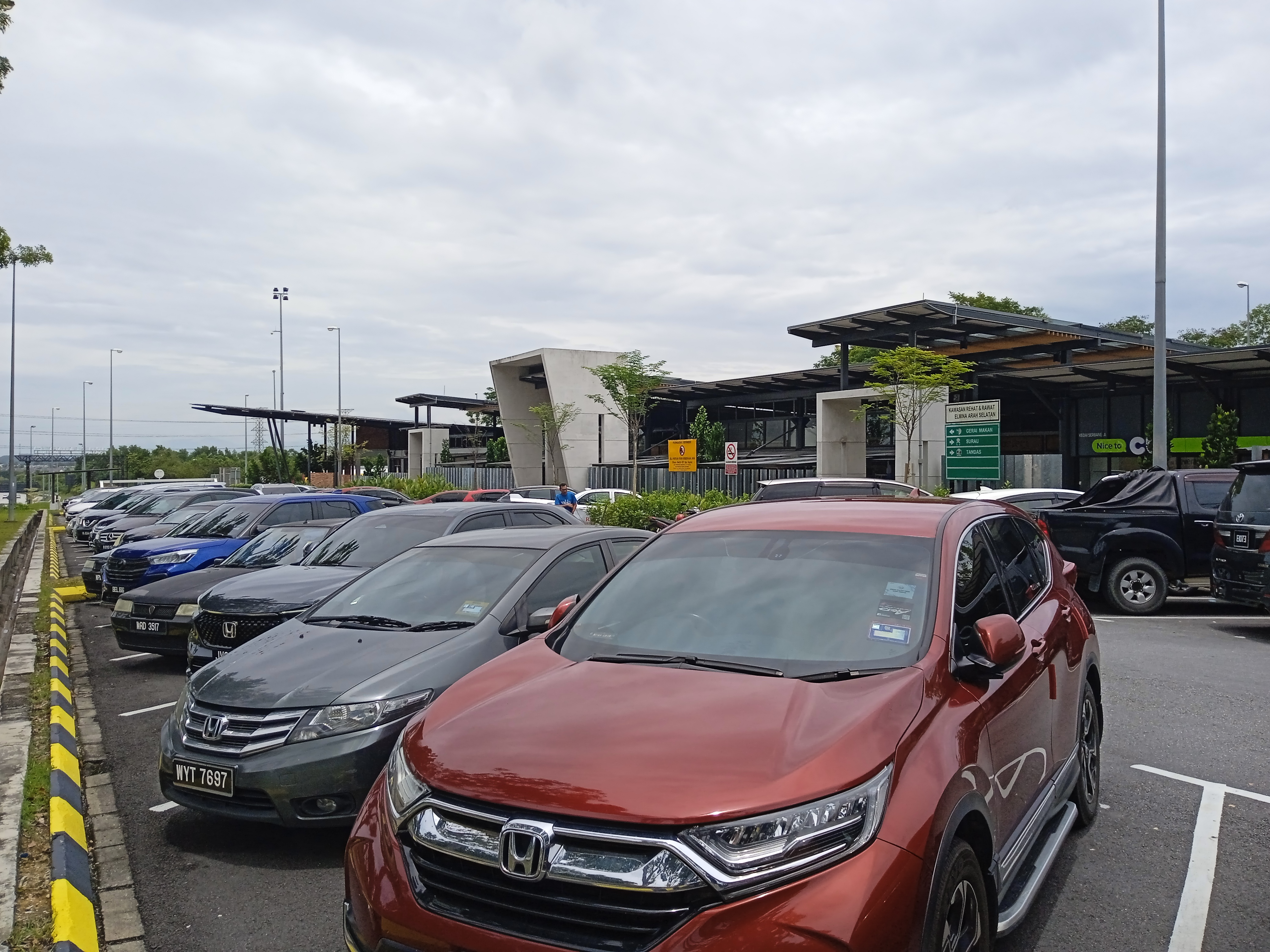
Parking area at the Elmina Rest Area (Southbound).
