= TTDI Jaya =

Human settlement in Malaysia

Coordinates: 3°6′4″N 101°33′14″E

TTDI Jaya is a major township in Shah Alam, Selangor, Malaysia. It is located about 3 kilometres (1.9 mi) from Shah Alam, the capital of Selangor. TTDI stands for Taman Tun Dr. Ismail.
