= Bukit Subang =

Township in Selangor, Malaysia

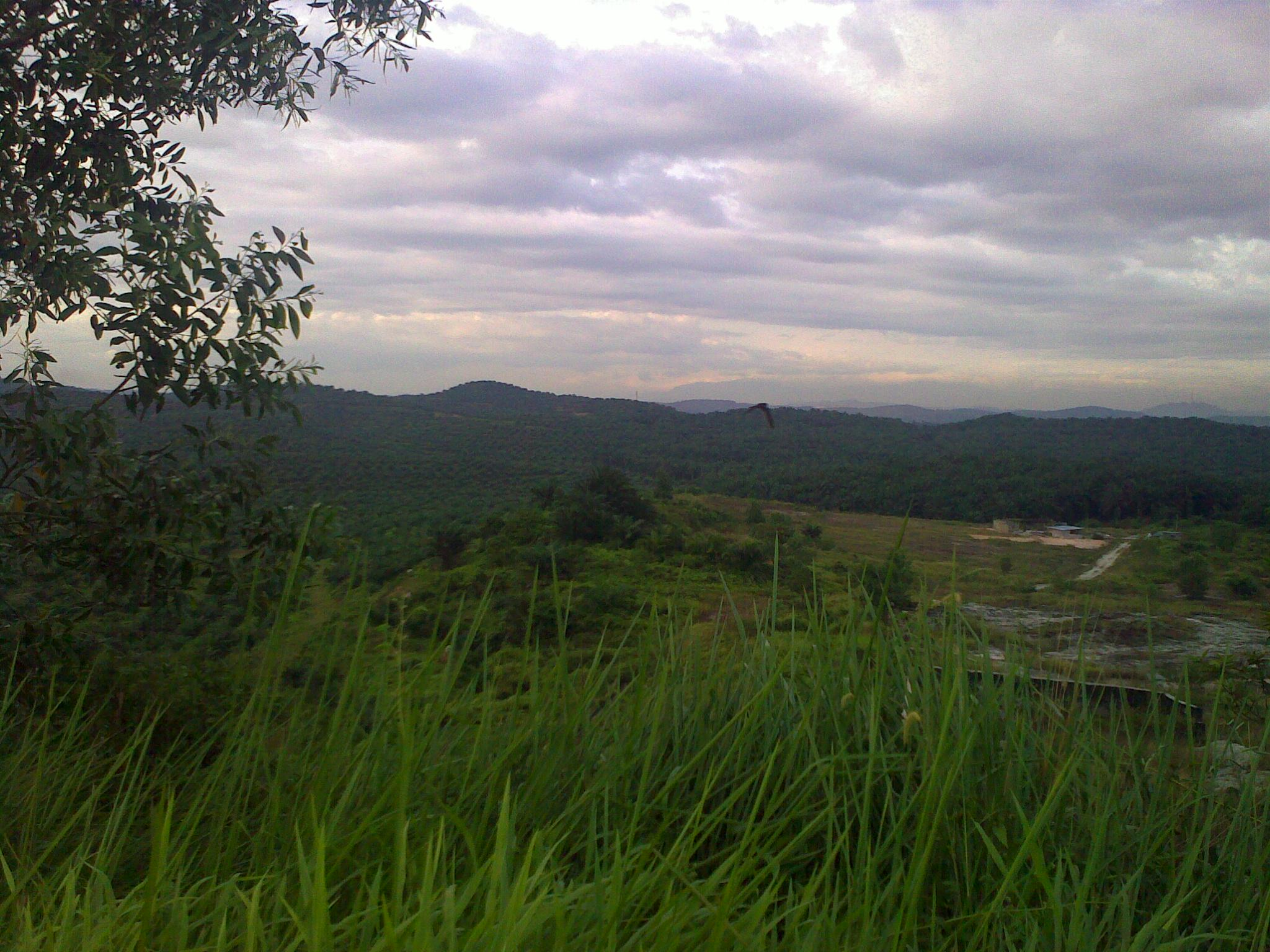
Bukit Subang

Bukit Subang is a township in Shah Alam, Selangor, Malaysia and is a part of Mukim Bukit Raja in Petaling District. This development project is led by Guthrie Berhad.
