= Puncak Perdana =

Human settlement in Malaysia

Coordinates: 3.135469°N 101.493445°E

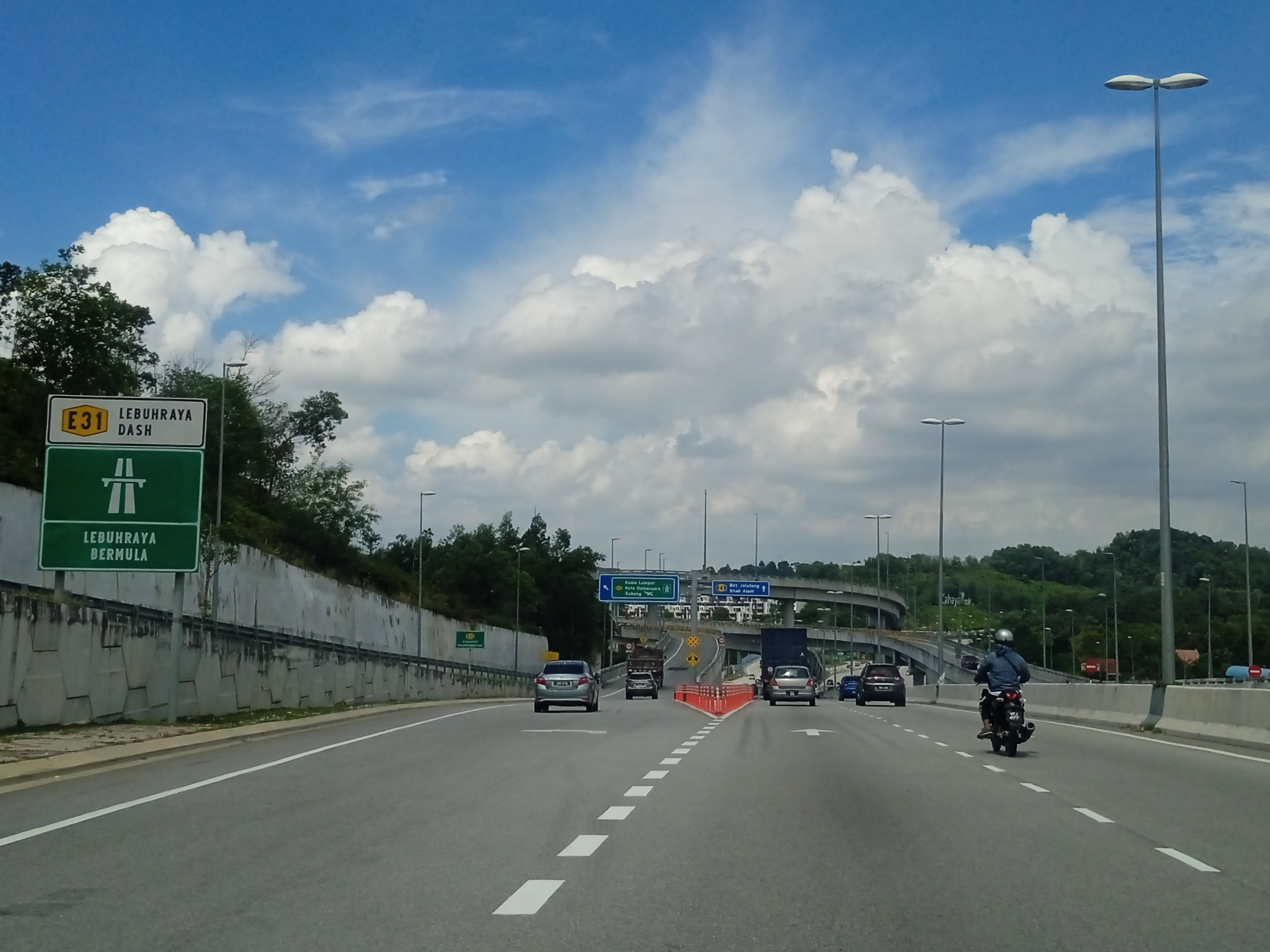
Puncak Perdana

Puncak Perdana is a main township in the northern part of Shah Alam municipal area in Selangor, Malaysia. The township was built on a 240-hectare site at Bukit Cerakah. It is located halfway between Meru and the Subang Airport, and is also adjacent to Setia Alam.

The original developer of the township was Central Challenger (M) Sdn Bhd, owned by Puncak Niaga and was its only project at launch in October 1996. It was built as a three-phase project and with the construction for the first phase began in November 1996. It was expected to become a "multimedia city" similar to Putrajaya.

== Facilities ==
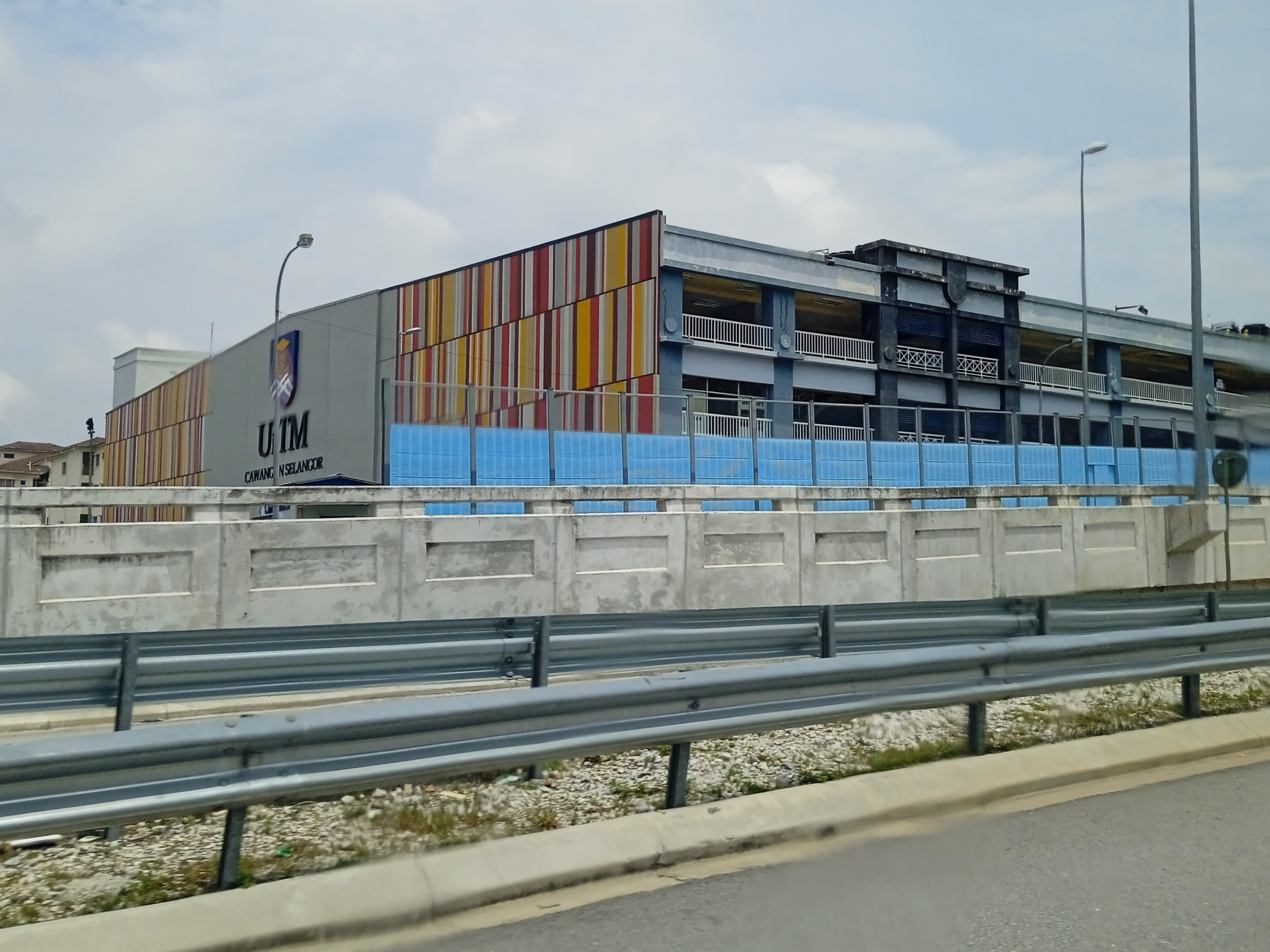
UiTM Puncak Perdana, 2023.

The UiTM Puncak Perdana campus is located here.

== Transportation ==
The area is accessible by Rapid KL bus route 754 from UiTM Puncak Perdana to Seksyen 13 Shah Alam via TTDI Jaya.
