= Bukit Jelutong =

Suburb of Shah Alam

Coordinates: 3.1066°N 101.5276°E

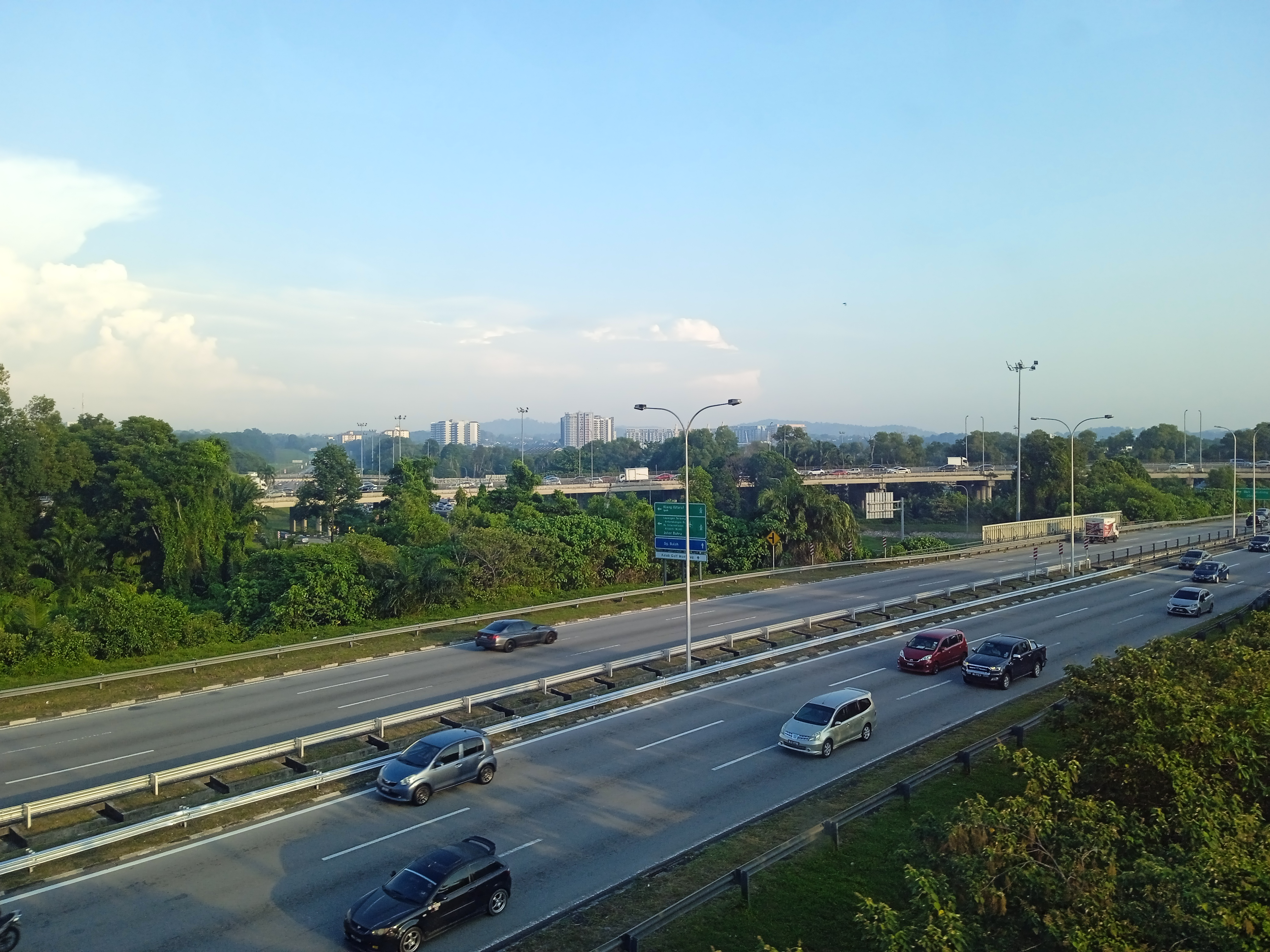
Bukit Jelutong

Bukit Jelutong (est. pop. 44,000) is an upscale suburb of Shah Alam, Selangor, Malaysia. The suburb is a planned community, with an area of over 2,200 acres (8.9 km^{2}) and developed by Guthrie Property Holding Berhad (GPHB), a subsidiary company of Sime Darby. Due to the suburb's upscale status, the residential units in Bukit Jelutong are mostly low-density bungalows and duplex houses, as well as some terraced houses. Bukit Jelutong has many parks and open grass areas.

== History ==
Bukit Jelutong is located on a former oil palm plantation, the Bukit Jelutong Estate, which was owned by Kumpulan Guthrie Berhad along with other estates in Selangor owned by the company which were collectively known as the "Guthrie Corridor".

The first property project of Guthrie Berhad, Bukit Jelutong is an integrated township with a garden city concept which covers over 840 hectares. The company had paid over RM 50 million to the Selangor state government for converting the land.

The development of Bukit Jelutong began in 1996, with the construction of the Guthrie Pavilion building, the present headquarters of GPHB. Since then, Bukit Jelutong has emerged as a much sought-after address in Shah Alam, with consistently well-received sales launches and price levels of real estate approaching those in more established areas in the Klang Valley, e.g. Petaling Jaya and Subang Jaya. In July 2005, the Guthrie Corridor Expressway connecting Bukit Jelutong to Rawang opened.

== Infrastructure and amenities ==
=== Transportation ===
Bukit Jelutong is well-served by an excellent road network. The suburb is linked to Kuala Lumpur, Petaling Jaya, Shah Alam, Klang and other population centers in the Klang Valley by the North Klang Valley Expressway (NKVE), the Guthrie Corridor Expressway (GCE), the Federal Highway and the North–South Expressway Central Link (ELITE). The expressways also link Bukit Jelutong to the Sultan Abdul Aziz Shah Airport, Kuala Lumpur International Airport (KLIA) and Port Klang.

The closest railway station to the suburb is KTM Batu Tiga on the KTM Tanjung Malim-Port Klang Line. However, after the completion of the LRT Shah Alam Line, Kerjaya Station, located on Persiaran Kerjaya.

=== Commercial ===
Bukit Jelutong has a small commercial center where sundry businesses are located. GPHB had intentionally avoided developing large-scale commercial areas to avoid traffic congestion and noise to maintain the suburb's atmosphere of serenity and exclusivity. Nonetheless, Bukit Jelutong has close proximity to the Lotus's, ÆON Mall Shah Alam and Giant stores, which are located in Seksyen 13.

=== Industrial ===
The Bukit Jelutong Industrial Park is located in the eastern outskirts of Bukit Jelutong. It is a low-density industrial park hosting low-pollution, hi-tech industries as well as logistics warehousing and service facilities. The tenants are mostly multinational corporations from various industries, such as Xixili, Scania, ThyssenKrupp and Schenker AG.

=== Recreation and leisure ===
Besides the abundance of parks, Bukit Jelutong is also notable for its proximity to several golf courses and country clubs. These include the Kelab Golf Sultan Abdul Aziz Shah, the Glenmarie Golf & Country Club, the Monterez Golf & Country Club, and the Saujana Golf & Country Club. The Shah Alam Stadium is also only a 5-minute drive away from Bukit Jelutong.

== Community ==
=== Community Participation ===
The Bukit Jelutong community has proven to be a close community judging from its regular events. The main yearly event is the Bukit Jelutong Carnival held annually. The Carnival is organised by the Bukit Jelutong Residents Association. Currently, most of the areas in Bukit Jelutong are gated and guarded through supports from the community itself.

=== Bukit Jelutong Residents Association ===
Registered in 2002, Bukit Jelutong Residents Association is very active. Regular events benefiting the residents are held regularly. Driven entirely by volunteers who are residents of Bukit Jelutong, the association is known for its close rapport with the local authorities.

== Image gallery ==
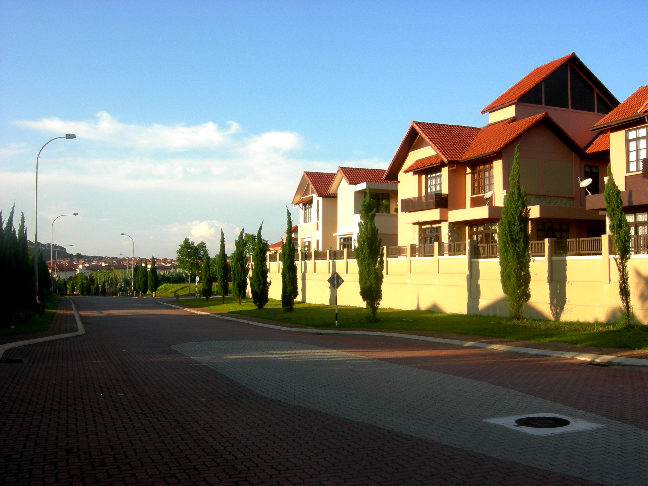
A cobblestoned street in Bukit Jelutong.

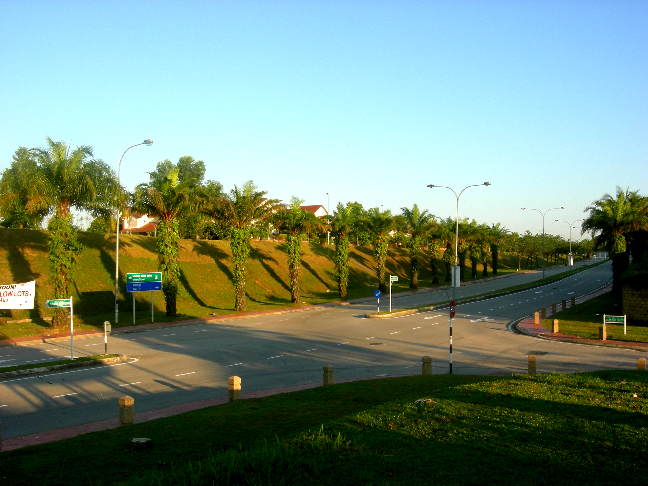
A view of a T-junction on the main boulevard in Bukit Jelutong.

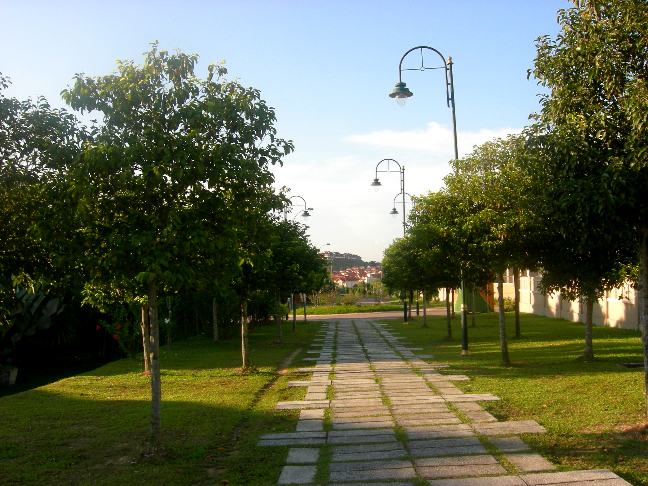
A tree-lined footpath with a cluster of Bukit Jelutong bungalows in the distance.

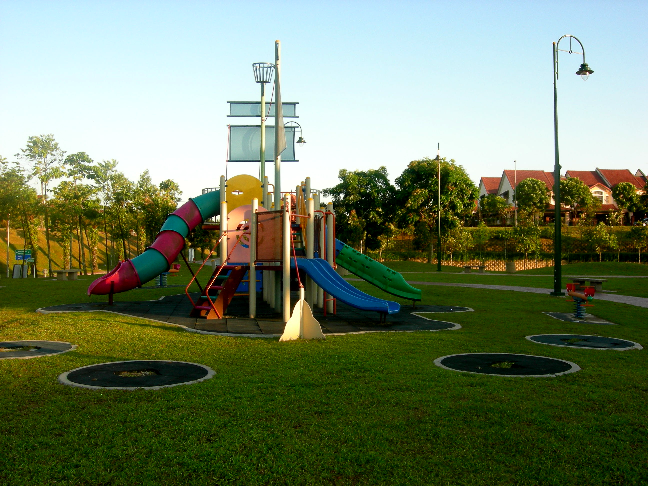
A Bukit Jelutong neighborhood playground.

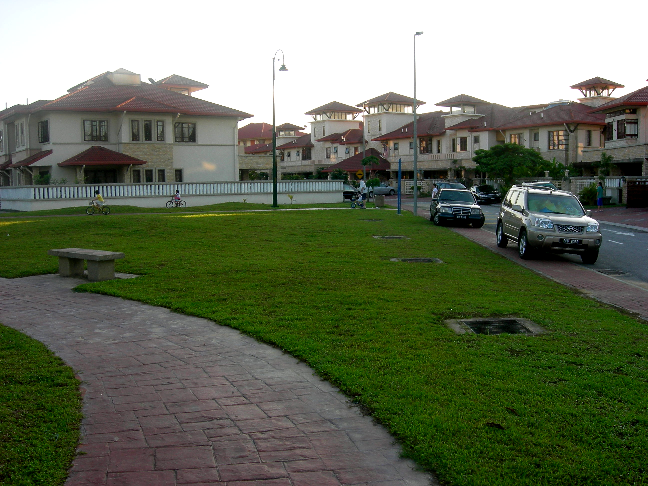
A typical Bukit Jelutong neighborhood.

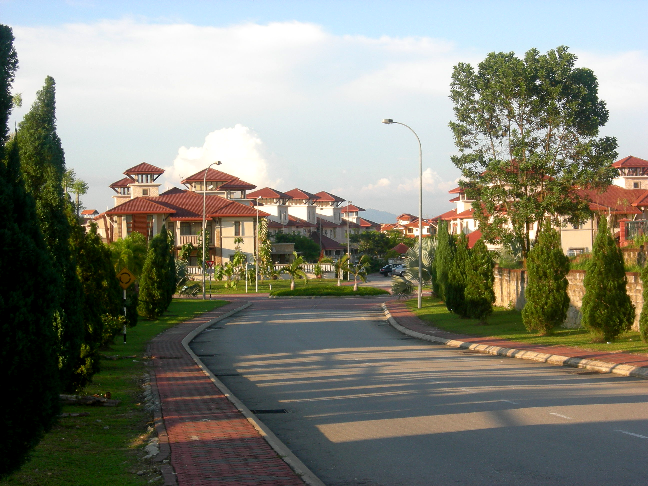
Another quiet Bukit Jelutong street.
