= Taman Tun Dr Ismail =

Taman Tun Dr. Ismail
- Township
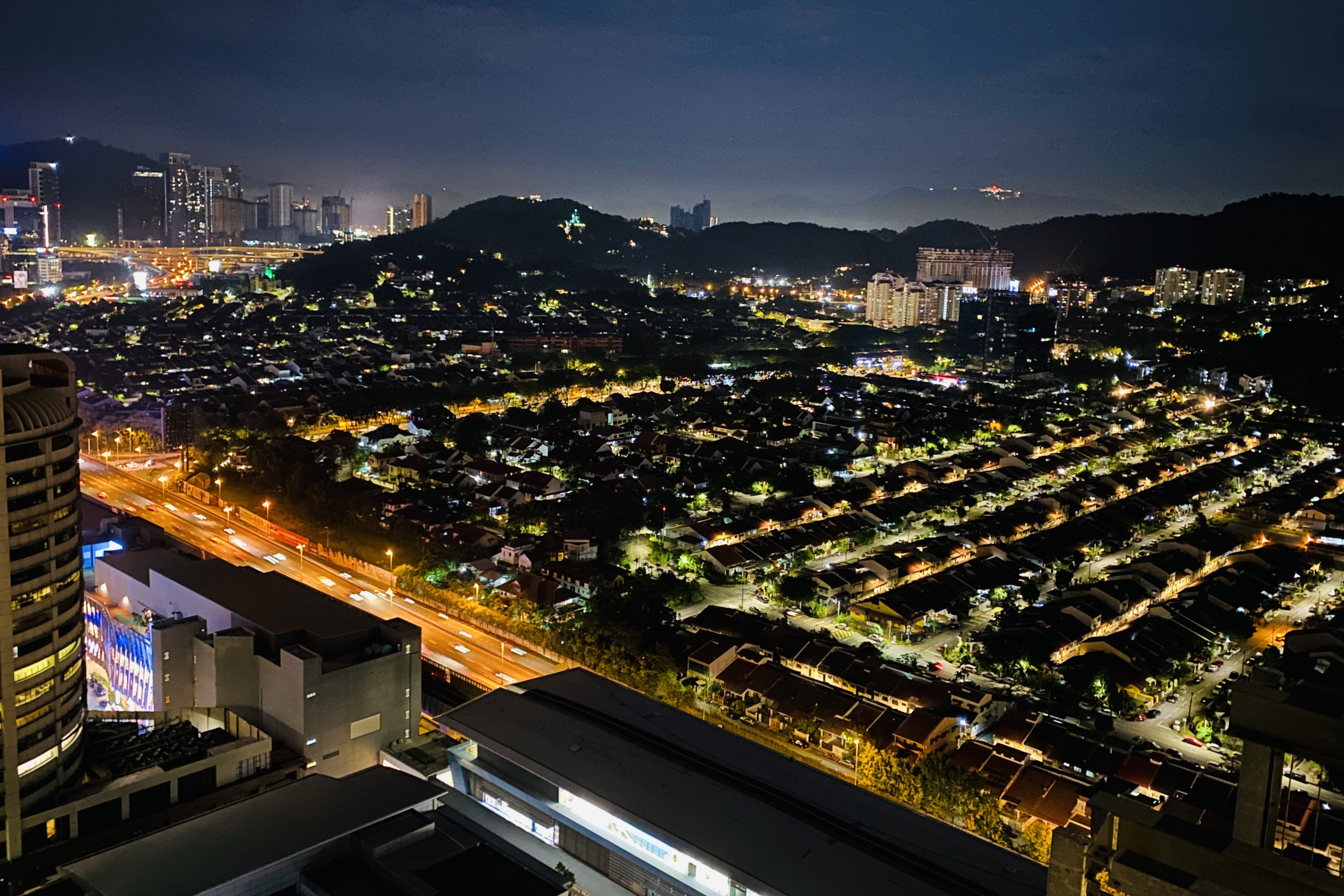

- Location in Kuala Lumpur Location in Malaysia
- Coordinates: 3°9′2″N 101°37′31″E
- Country: Malaysia
- State: Federal Territory of Kuala Lumpur
- Constituency: Segambut

Government
  - Local Authority: Dewan Bandaraya Kuala Lumpur
  - Mayor: Nor Hisham Ahmad Dahlan
- Time zone: UTC+8 (MST)
- Postcode: 60000
- Dialling code: +60 377
- Police: Taman Tun Dr. Ismail, Brickfields (HQ)
- Fire: Taman Tun Dr. Ismail

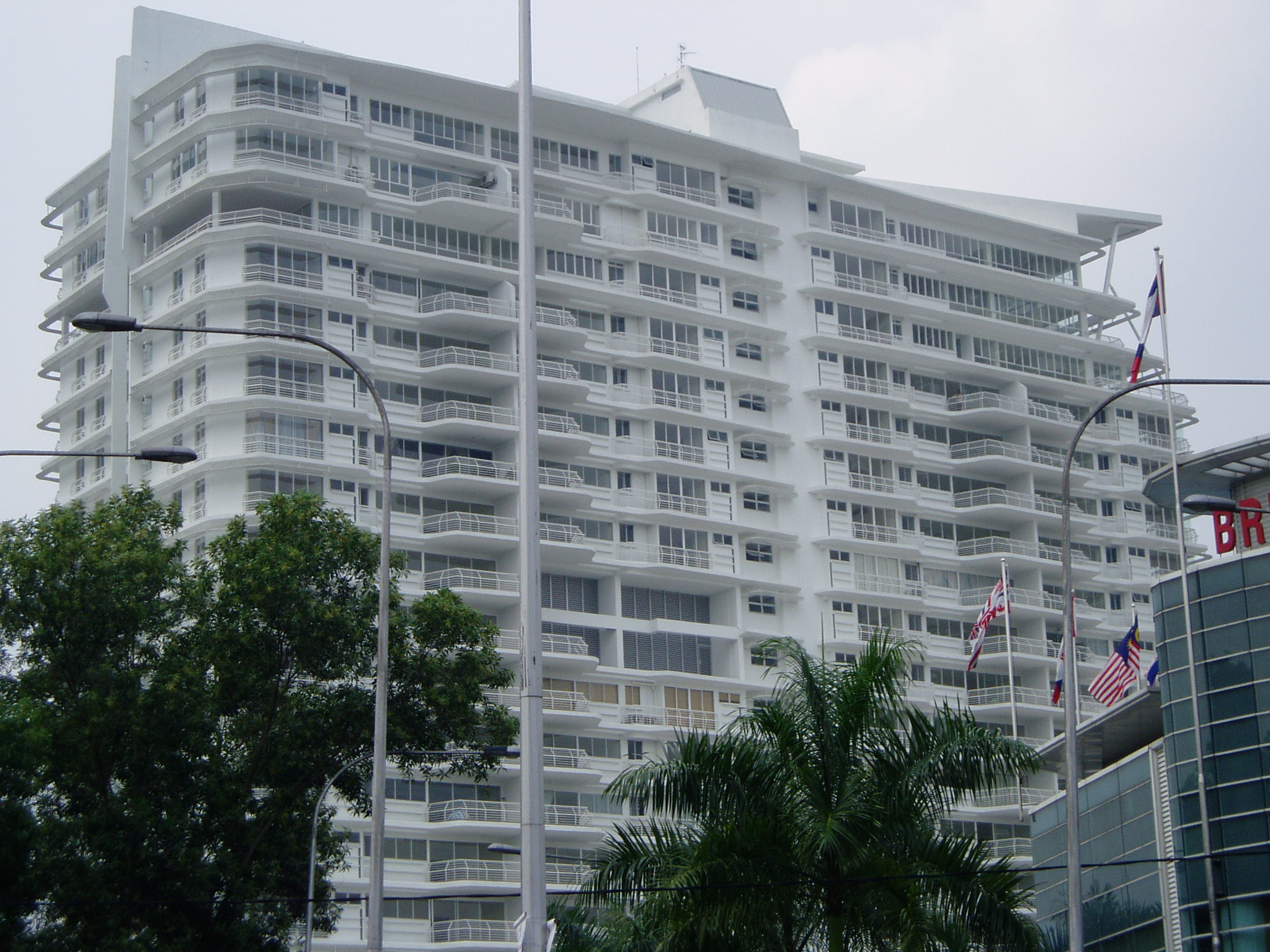
View of The Residence in TTDI, Kuala Lumpur completed in 2006.

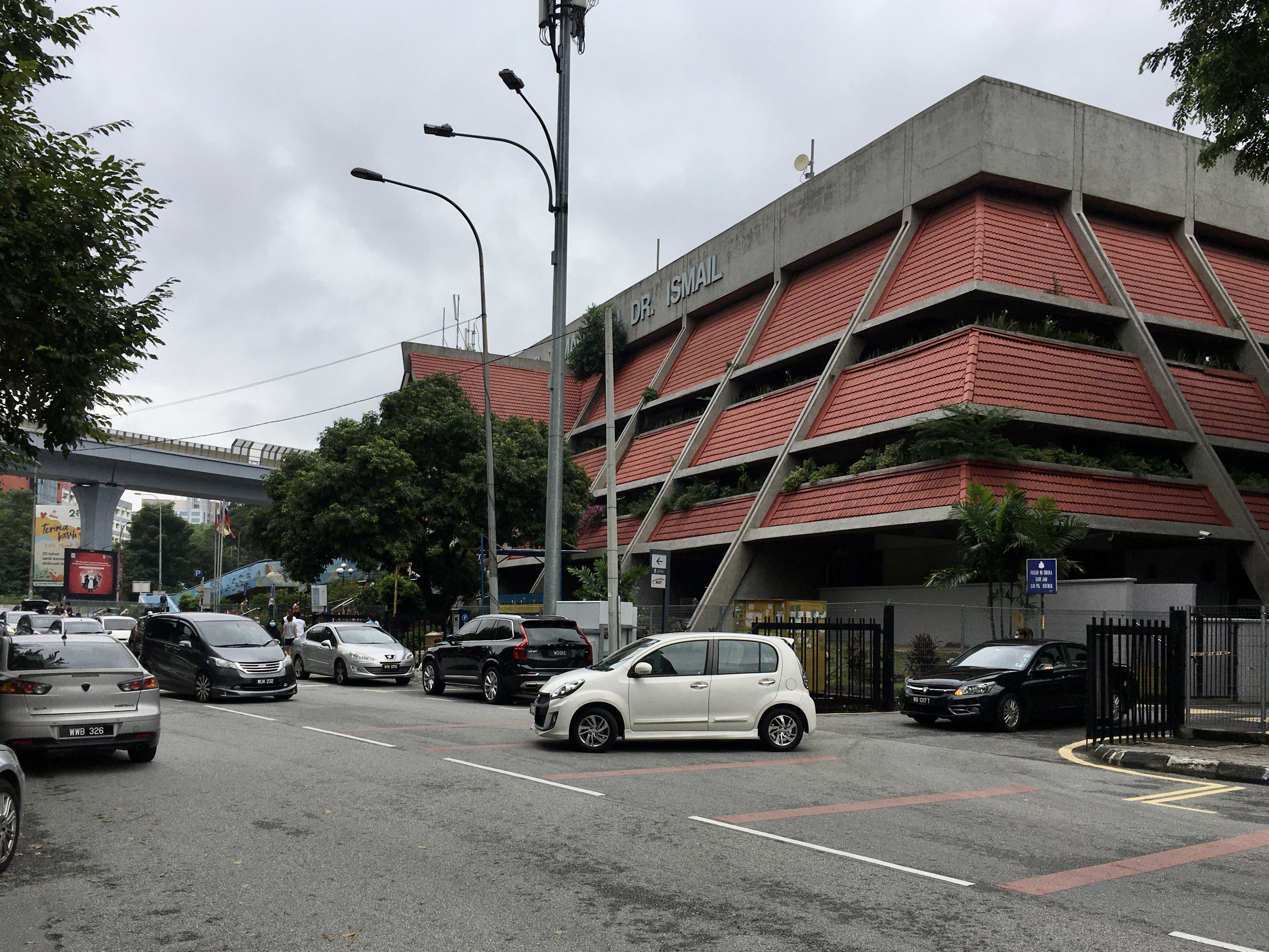
View from the outside of TTDI Market in 2020.

Taman Tun Dr. Ismail is a mid-sized township in Kuala Lumpur, Malaysia. Situated on the border of Kuala Lumpur and Selangor, it is within the vicinity of other townships including Bandar Utama Damansara, Damansara Utama, Mutiara Damansara. It also neighbours Bukit Kiara and Sri Hartamas and is within easy access of Bangsar and Damansara Heights. This township is in the Federal Territory of Kuala Lumpur with Kuala Lumpur City Hall (DBKL) as its local authority.

It is primarily an affluent residential neighborhood with businesses ranging from retail shops, restaurants and offices. Menara Ken and Plaza VADS are the two high-rise office buildings in TTDI. The township was named after Tun Dr. Ismail bin Abdul Rahman, Malaysia's first ambassador to the United States and a Malaysian representative to the United Nations, before becoming Malaysia's Deputy Prime Minister in 1970. Taman Tun Dr. Ismail is often abbreviated as "TTDI".

== History ==
Taman Tun Dr. Ismail was originally a 286-hectare piece of old rubber estate land located on the western fringe of Kuala Lumpur bordering the state of Selangor. Development plans for Taman Tun Dr. Ismail began in 1973 when two experienced developers teamed up to form UDA-Seapark Sdn Bhd, a joint venture company between the Urban Development Authority (UDA), the Government's arm for urban planning and redevelopment and SEA Housing Corp. Sdn Bhd., a prominent private development company headed by the well known philanthropist, the late Lee Yan Lian.

The area at that time was considered rural and thought of as being too far from the metropolitan city due to the fact that the condition of access via Jalan Damansara was narrow, winding and unlit at night. UDA saw potential in developing the area, joined with the expertise of the two giants. The new township was launched and named after the late Tun Dr. Ismail, an outstanding statesman.

Construction of the township began in 1974 after Kuala Lumpur was created as a Federal Territory following its cession to the federal government from the state of Selangor. The gross development value was approximately RM 1.35 billion during that time. TTDI township consists of a mixture of development ranging from landed properties, townhouses, condominiums and commercials with its own landscaped park. TTDI township also provides numerous community facilities to its residents such as schools, colleges, recreational parks, banks, religious amenities, medical institution, etc. It is accessible via major highways such as Damansara–Puchong Expressway (LDP).

The ownership of the developing company TTDI Development Sdn Bhd has changed over the past decades. The Master Plan of the township had also undergone four major improvements since its inception in 1974 to cater to the changing needs of the residents.

In May 1982, UDA requested for a 1.4-hectare (3.5-acre) site at Phase 6 for their proposed Dry Market to replace the Central Market in Kuala Lumpur, which was formerly the main wet market in Kuala Lumpur, then earmarked to become a cultural center. Hence a major change to the master plan took place which incorporated the Dry Market, more open spaces, a row of modern looking shop-offices and car parks, an office complex called VADS Plaza (formerly IBM Plaza), townhouses (Kiara Green and Trellises) and condominiums at the peak of Taman Tun Dr. Ismail (Phase 5E).

During the recession of 1986, the country faced an economic slowdown which adversely affected the property market. The management proposed a change to the Phase 5 layout off Jalan Datuk Sulaiman from 183 units of detached bungalows and 88 units of semi-detached bungalows into 580 units of link houses which is affordable for large income groups and also in line with the Government's long term policy of encouraging more home ownership. This layout also includes the provision of extra landscaped open spaces and a high-rise condominium block at the fringes of Taman Tun Dr. Ismail.

The third major change which was made in August 1988 was to convert the proposed town center at Phases 7 and 8 off Jalan Burhanuddin Helmi to condominium units based on Resorts living when there was a sudden demand for Kiara Green Townhouses. The fourth major change was to build the RM6.5 million Damansara bypass to ease traffic congestion and the relocation of the temporary oxidation pond built in 1983 in front of the Modern Dry Market. Residents and the users of Jalan Damansara in the 1980s were familiar with this very odorous landmark. In 1993, the infamous plant was relocated further up the bypass and replaced by a modern mechanized regional sewage treatment plant costing RM10 million. It was followed by the widening of Jalan Damansara to the junction with Jalan Leong Yew Koh at a cost of RM4 million. With the upgrading and improvements to the remaining stretches of Jalan Damansara, access to Taman Tun had improved tremendously.

In 1994, Taman Tun Dr. Ismail township was awarded with the FIABCI Award of Distinction for Residential Property. It was one of the most prestigious neighborhoods in Malaysia at that time. Meanwhile, Guthrie Berhad, a plantation company, worked with Permodalan Nasional Berhad to acquire Taman Tun Dr Ismail, which was already well established in the property market.

Since then, the surrounding areas around it were further developed. They include Bandar Utama, Bandar Sri Damansara, Desa Park City and Mont Kiara.

== Transportation ==
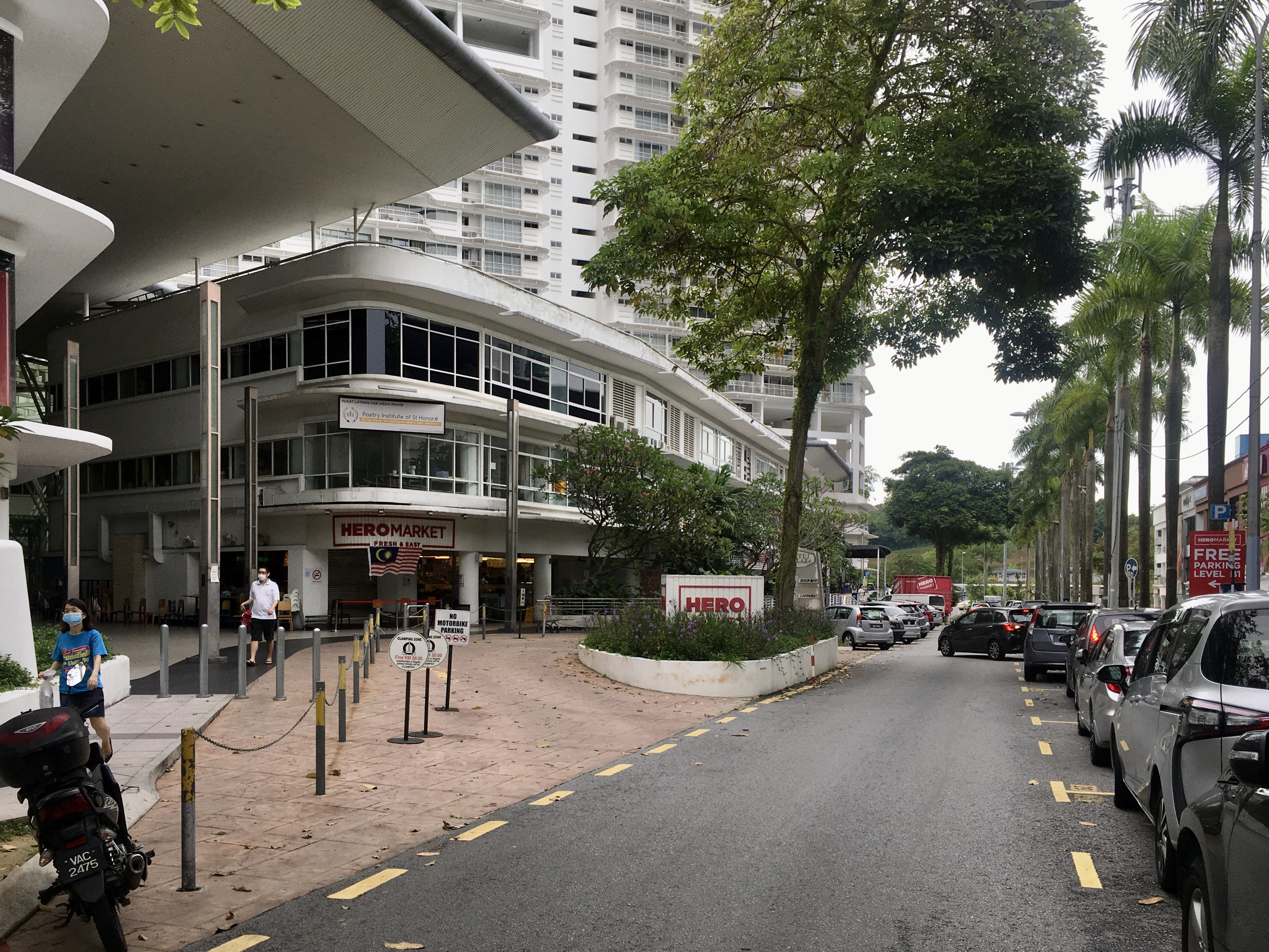
Jalan Wan Kadir 3, south towards the MRT station, with Plaza TTDI at the left.

TTDI lends its name to the TTDI MRT station on the Kajang Line.

== Features ==
- Many roads in Taman Tun Dr. Ismail have been named after prominent Malaysian leaders:
1. Aminuddin Baki
2. Abdul Rahim Kajai
3. Athinahapan
4. Burhanuddin Helmi
5. Datuk Sulaiman Abdul Rahman
6. Zaaba
7. Leong Yew Koh
8. Tun Abang Haji Openg
9. Tun Mohd Fuad Stephens
10. Wan Kadir

== Taman Rimba Kiara ==
Taman Rimba Kiara is a recreational park within the neighbourhood of Taman Tun Dr Ismail. There were proposals to construct a modern condominium development on a portion of the existing Taman Rimba Kiara grounds. It was initially approved by DBKL - the local city council. TTDI residents had protested against the proposed high-end development, which had gained conditional planning permission and development order by City Hall.

DBKL had in 2016 approved the housing development on 4.86ha of land in Taman Rimba Kiara, which was designated as a public open space under the Kuala Lumpur City Plan 2020.

On April 18, 2023, a momentous decision was made by the Federal Court, affirming the previous ruling by the Court of Appeal to invalidate the development order for the Taman Rimba Kiara condominium project putting an end to a protracted dispute that has lasted almost six years.

== Education ==
- Sekolah Kebangsaan Taman Tun Dr. Ismail (1)
- Sekolah Kebangsaan Taman Tun Dr. Ismail (2)
- Sekolah Menengah Kebangsaan Taman Tun Dr. Ismail
- Sekolah Rendah Agama Taman Tun Dr. Ismail
- Mantissa College
