= Mantissa =

Mantissa ( /mænˈtɪsə/) may refer to:

- Mantissa (logarithm), the fractional part of the common (base-10) logarithm
- Significand (also commonly called mantissa), the significant digits of a floating-point number or a number in scientific notation
- Mantissa (band)
- Mantissa (novel), a 1982 novel by John Fowles
- Mantissa College
- De anima libri mantissa, sometimes simply referred as Mantissa, treatise attributed to Alexander of Aphrodisias
