= Phileo Damansara MRT station =

MRT station in Kuala Lumpur, Malaysia

KG12 Phileo Damansara
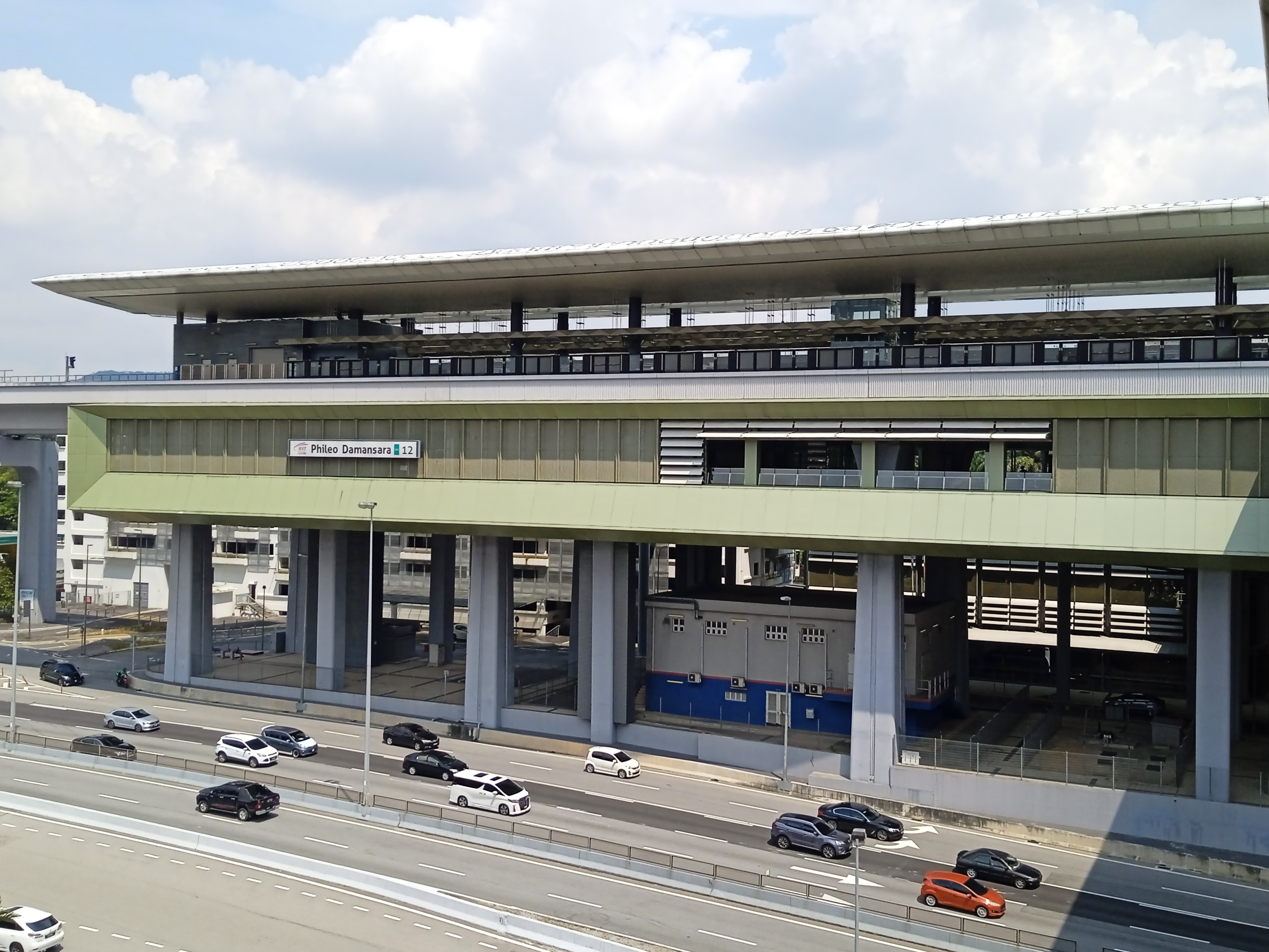
- Overall view of the station from Entrance A

General information
- Other names: Malay: فيليو دامنسارا (Jawi); Chinese: 菲利欧白沙罗; Tamil: பிலியோ டாமன்சாரா
- Location: Eastbound carriageway of the Sprint Expressway (Damansara Link), Bukit Kiara; 60000 Kuala Lumpur; Malaysia
- Coordinates: 3°7′45.43″N 101°38′34.41″E
- System: Rapid KL
- Owner: MRT Corp
- Operator: Rapid Rail
- Line: 9 Kajang Line
- Platforms: 1 Island platform
- Tracks: 2

Construction
- Structure type: Elevated
- Parking: Available with payment. 305 total parking bays; 100 motorcycle bays.
- Cycle facilities: Available. 6 bicycle bays at station; 31 bicycle bays at MSPR.

Other information
- Station code: KG12

History
- Opened: 16 December 2016; 9 years ago
- Former names: Seksyen 16

Services
Preceding station		Following station
Taman Tun Dr Ismail towards Kwasa Damansara	Kajang Line	Pusat Bandar Damansara towards Kajang
Taman Tun Dr Ismail towards Kwasa Damansara	Kajang Line Future service	Bukit Kiara Selatan towards Kajang
Location

The Phileo Damansara MRT station is a mass rapid transit station in Kuala Lumpur, serving the Phileo Damansara Commercial Centre and Sections 16, 17, 17A and 19 of Petaling Jaya, Selangor, Malaysia. The station itself is located next to the Kuala Lumpur-Selangor state border.

The station is on the MRT Kajang Line and was opened on 16 December 2016 under Phase One operations of the line (then known as the MRT Sungai Buloh-Kajang Line).

== Station location ==
The station adopts the standard elevated station design of the MRT Kajang Line with two levels. However, unlike most of the elevated stations, the station features an island platform.

The station is located on the eastbound carriageway of the Damansara Link section of the Sprint Expressway, near the Phileo Damansara interchange. Despite being named after and serving the Phileo Damansara area, which is a part Petaling Jaya in the state of Selangor, the station itself is situated in the Federal Territory of Kuala Lumpur. The station and railway tracks leading into the station lie directly beside the Selangor-Kuala Lumpur border.

The location was formerly occupied by a Shell petrol station and a second-hand car dealership. The headquarters of The Star newspaper is located nearby. A golf course (Kelab Golf Perkhidmatan Awam) is located directly north of the station.

== Station layout ==
L2	Platform level	Platform 1: 9 Kajang Line towards KG35 Kajang (→)
L2	Platform level	Island platform
L2	Platform level	Platform 2: 9 Kajang Line towards KG04 Kwasa Damansara (←)
L1	Concourse	Faregates; ticketing machines; customer service office; station control; shop; pedestrian link bridge over Sprint Highway to entrance A; pedestrian link bridge to multi-storey park and ride (MSPR) building.
G	Ground Level	Feeder bus stop, taxi and drop-off lay-bys at Entrance A; taxi and drop-off lay-by at Entrance B; walkway to MSPR building.

== Exits and entrances ==
The station has two entrances. Entrance A is located across the Sprint Expressway (and also across the Selangor-Kuala Lumpur border) from the station, at the side of Jalan 16/11 and adjacent to the Phileo Damansara Commercial Centre. It is connected to the station by a long pedestrian link bridge over the Sprint Expressway. Entrance B is on the north side of the Sprint Highway (directly beneath the station).

Kajang Line station
Entrance	Location	Destination	Picture
A	South side of Jalan 16/11	Feeder bus stop, Phileo Damansara Commercial Centre, Eastin Hotel, CP Tower, Sections 16 and 17 Petaling Jaya	
B	North side of Sprint Highway	Taxi lay-by, private vehicle lay-by, MSPR, Petronas Sprint Highway	

== Services and connections ==
=== Services ===
Phileo Damansara is between Pusat Bandar Damansara and Taman Tun Dr Ismail (TTDI) stations on the MRT Kajang Line. A future in-fill station called Bukit Kiara Selatan i being planned between Phileo Damansara and Pusat Bandar Damansara, which will also be an interchange with the future MRT Circle Line. Train frequencies are as high as 4 minutes during peak hours, or as low as 10 minutes during non-peak hours. This applies to trains in both directions. Sometimes, trains may begin or end their service at Phileo Damansara, (Note: During disruptions, trains would terminate at Phileo Damansara, confirming that it is a legitimate point of reversal.) with a maximum of two trains to be stabled at sidings near the station.

=== Connections ===
When Kajang Line services began, two feeder bus services started running, linking the station with several residential areas in the northern part of central Petaling Jaya (south and west of the station) and the University of Malaya. These feeder buses operate from Entrance A. The frequencies of these buses vary from time to time, but are generally every 15 to 20 minutes on average.

Route No.	Origin	Destination	Via	Remarks
T815	KG12 Phileo Damansara (Entrance A)	University of Malaya	Sprint Expressway; Jalan 17/1; Jalan Prof Diraja Ungku Aziz (Jalan Universiti); Lingkungan Budi	This route interchanges with Route T789 to KJ19 Universiti
T816	KG12 Phileo Damansara (Entrance A)	Section SS2	Sprint Expressway; Damansara–Puchong Expressway; Jalan SS 2/75; Jalan 19/8; Jalan Prof Diraja Ungku Aziz (Jalan Universiti); Jalan 17/2; Jalan 17/13; Jalan 17/22; Jalan Dato' Abu Bakar (16/1)	
T786	KJ21 Asia Jaya	KG12 Phileo Damansara (Entrance A)	University of Malaya Medical Centre; KJ19 Taman Jaya; PJ State; Jalan Prof Diraja Ungku Aziz (Jalan Universiti); Jalan Prof. Khoo Kay Kim (Jalan Semangat); Jalan Harapan; Seksyen 17; Seksyen 13; Seksyen 14; Seksyen 17; Seksyen 5	Rapid DRT - Mobi

== Gallery ==
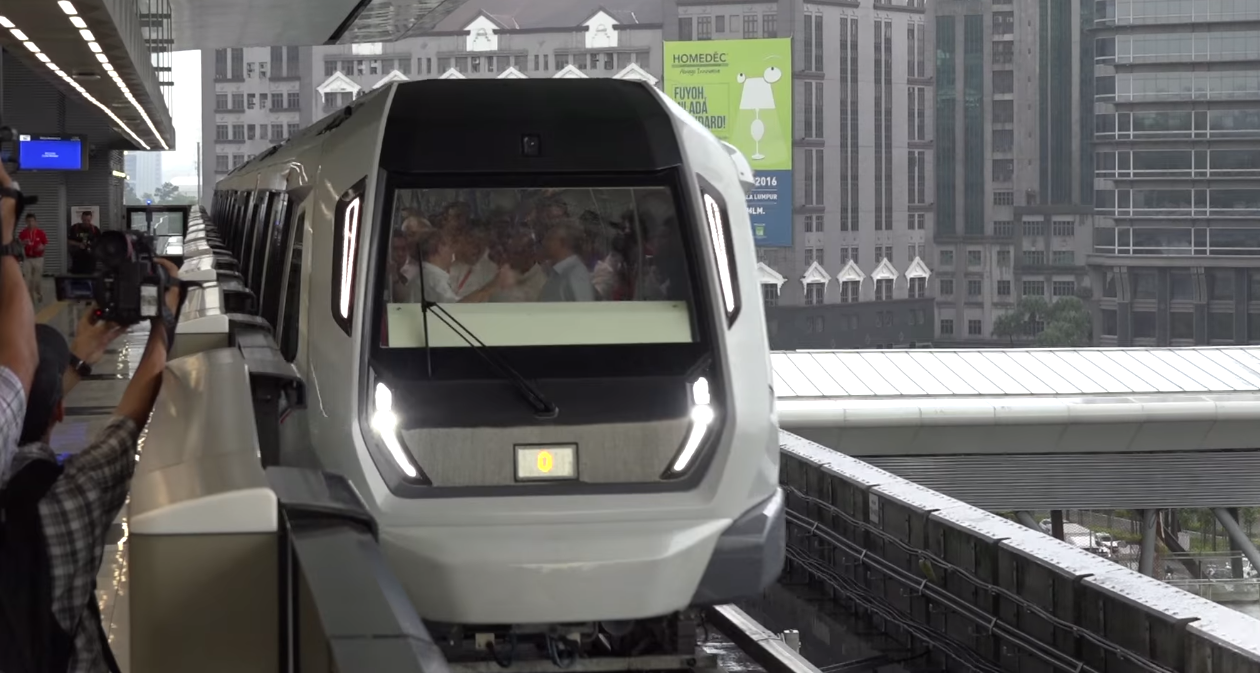
MRT train entering the Phileo Damansara MRT station platform

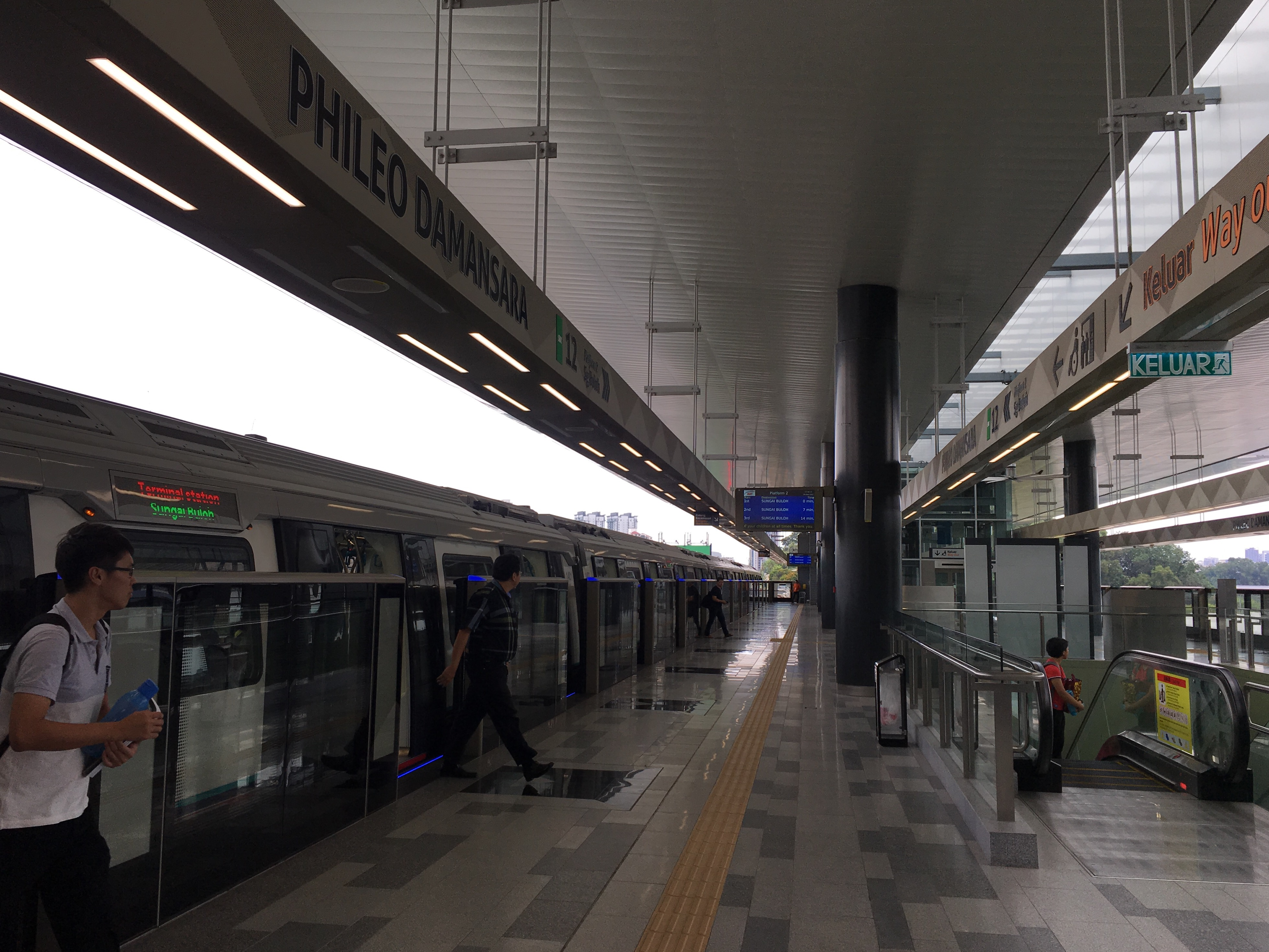
Passengers alighting from a train at the platform

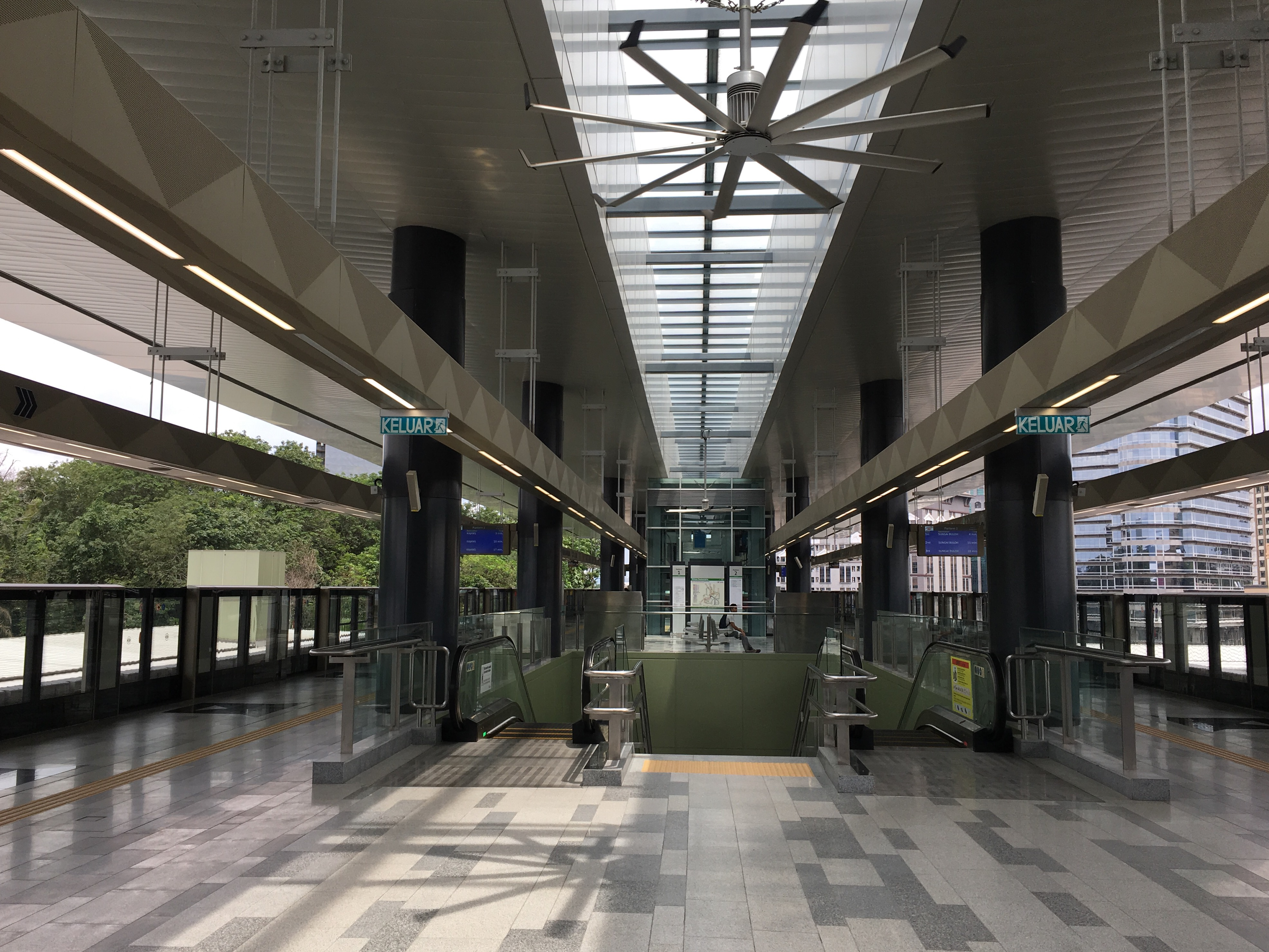
View of the platform

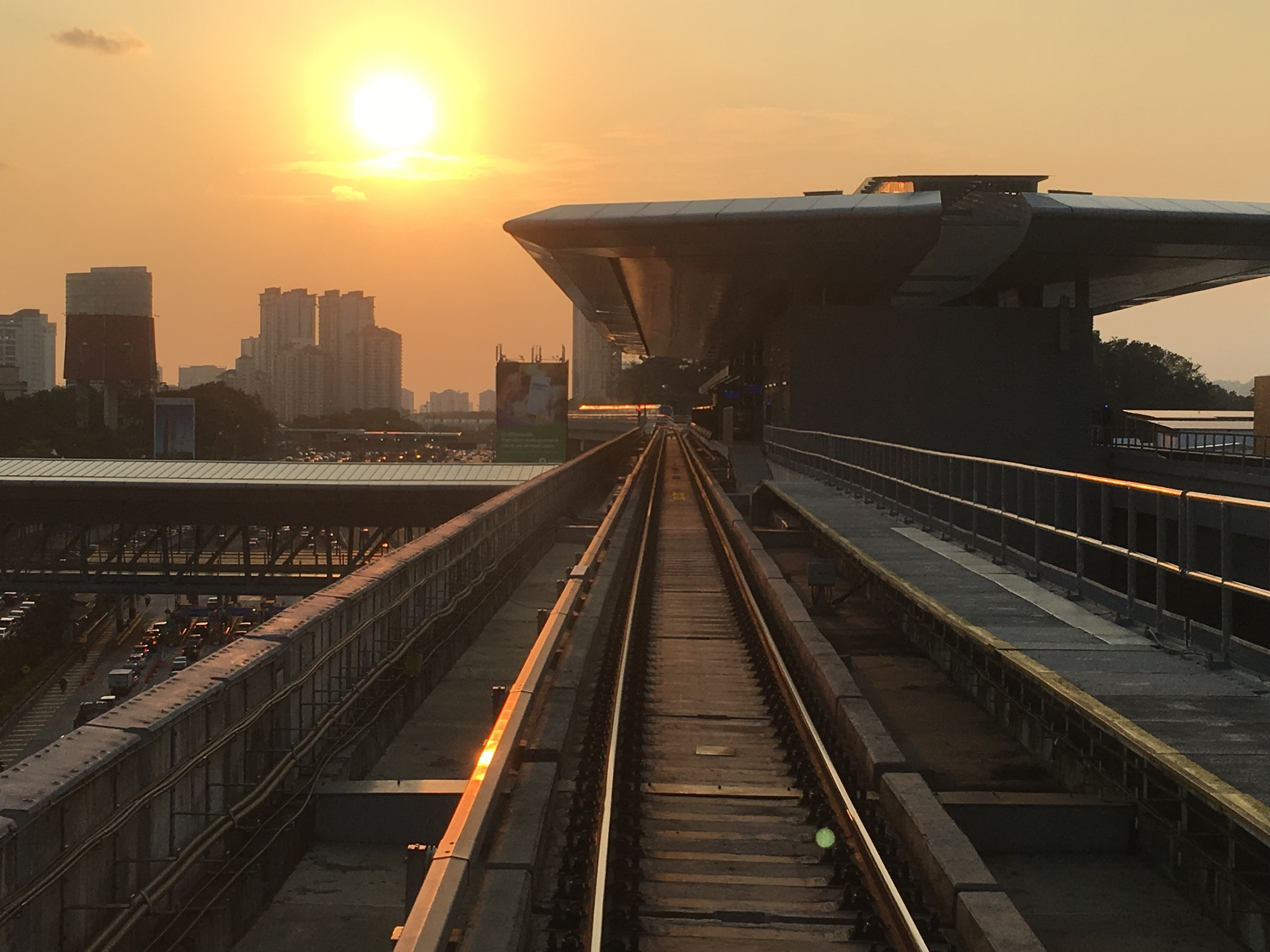
Sungai Buloh train approaching the station in the evening

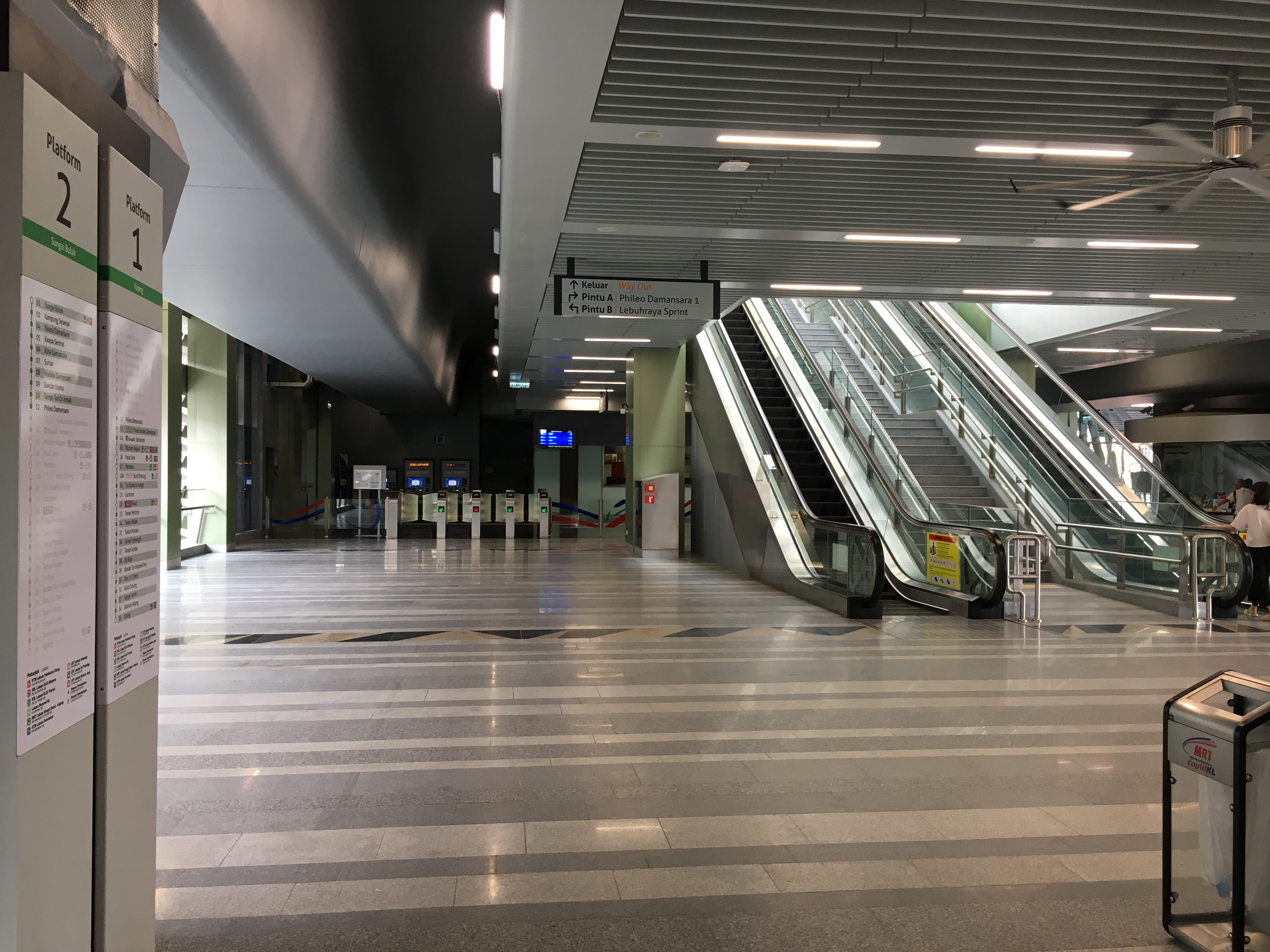
Paid area of the concourse level of the station

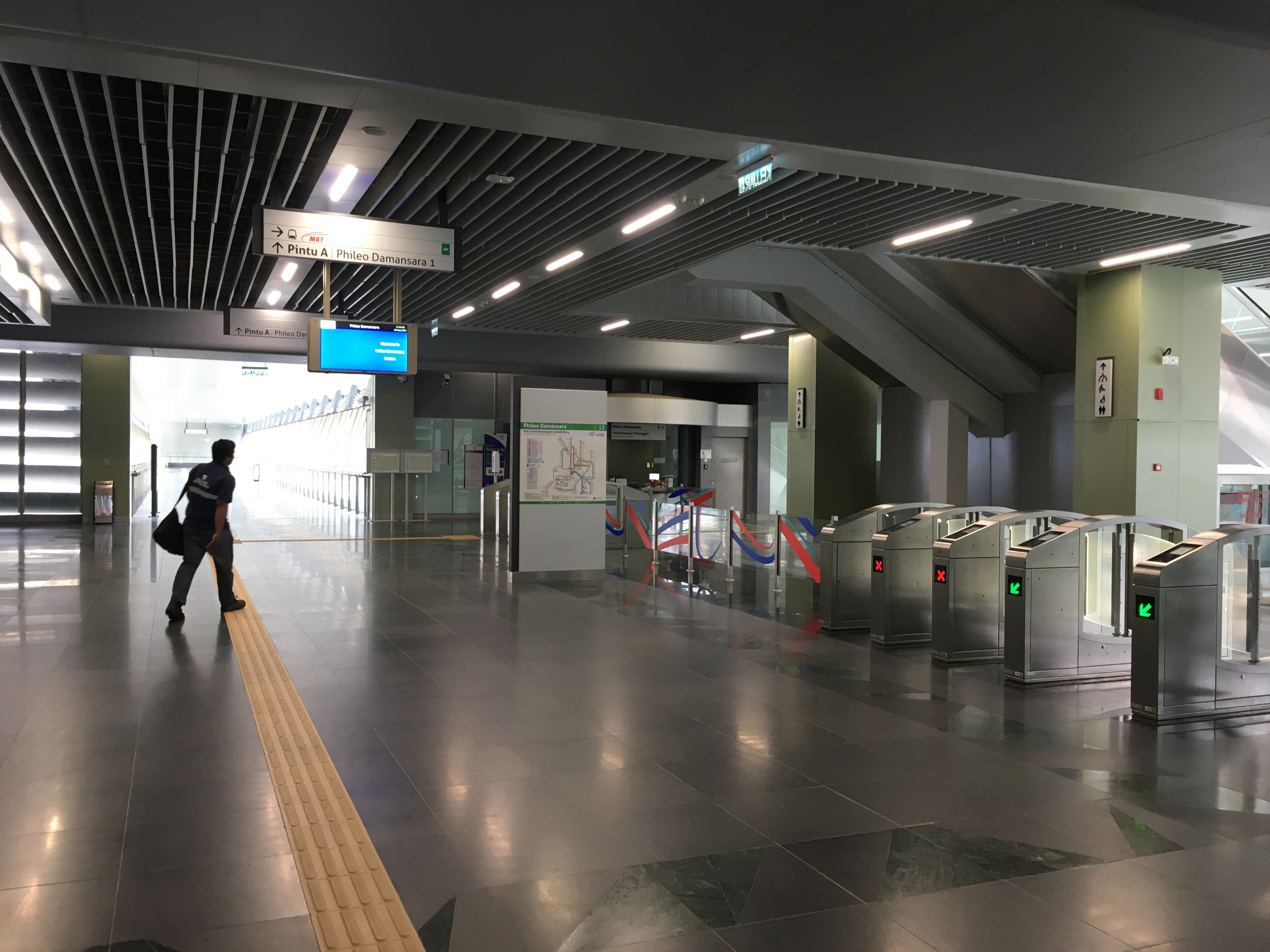
Unpaid area and fare gates at the concourse level of the station

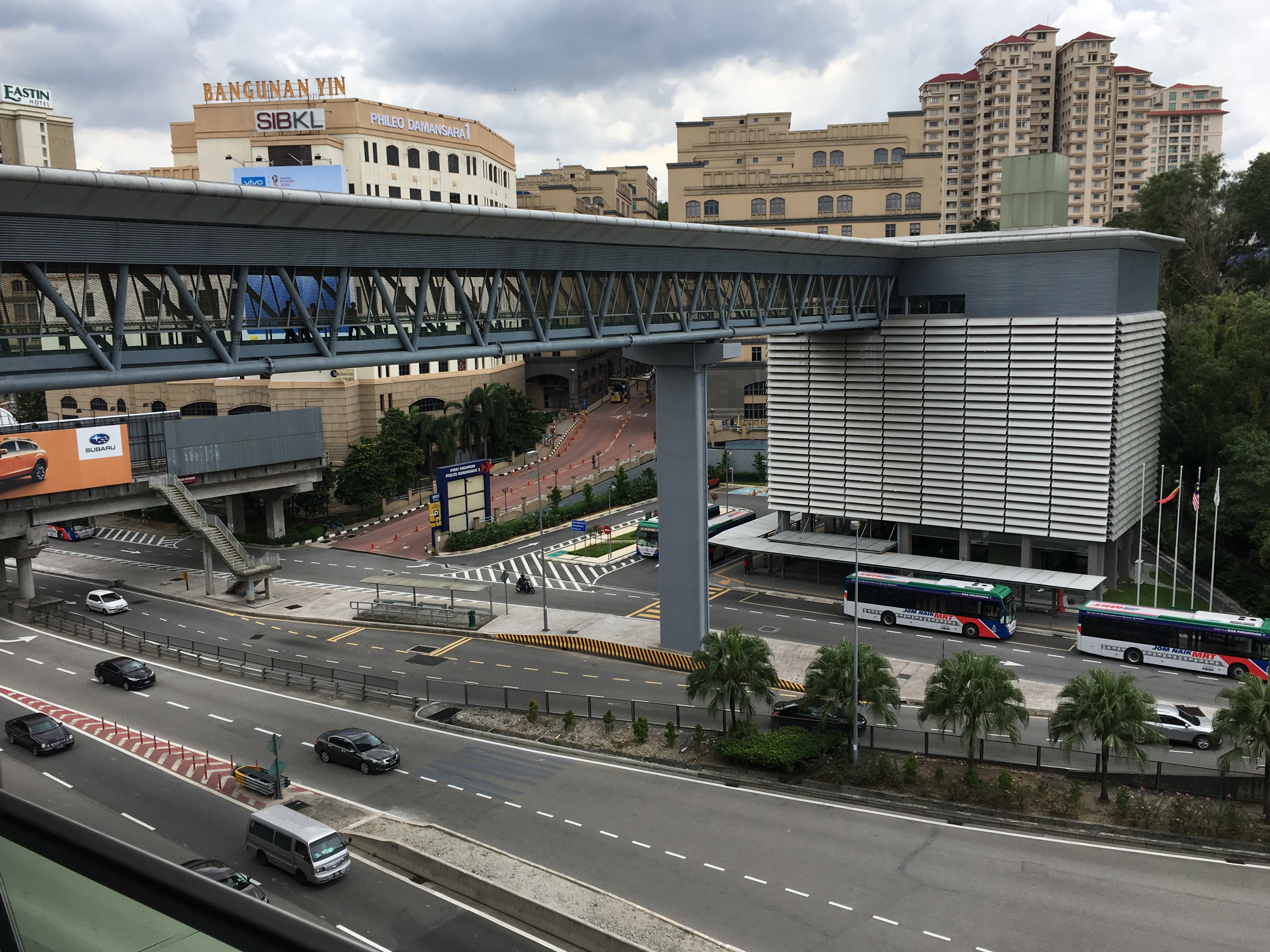
Pedestrian link bridge over the Sprint Highway to the station's entrance A

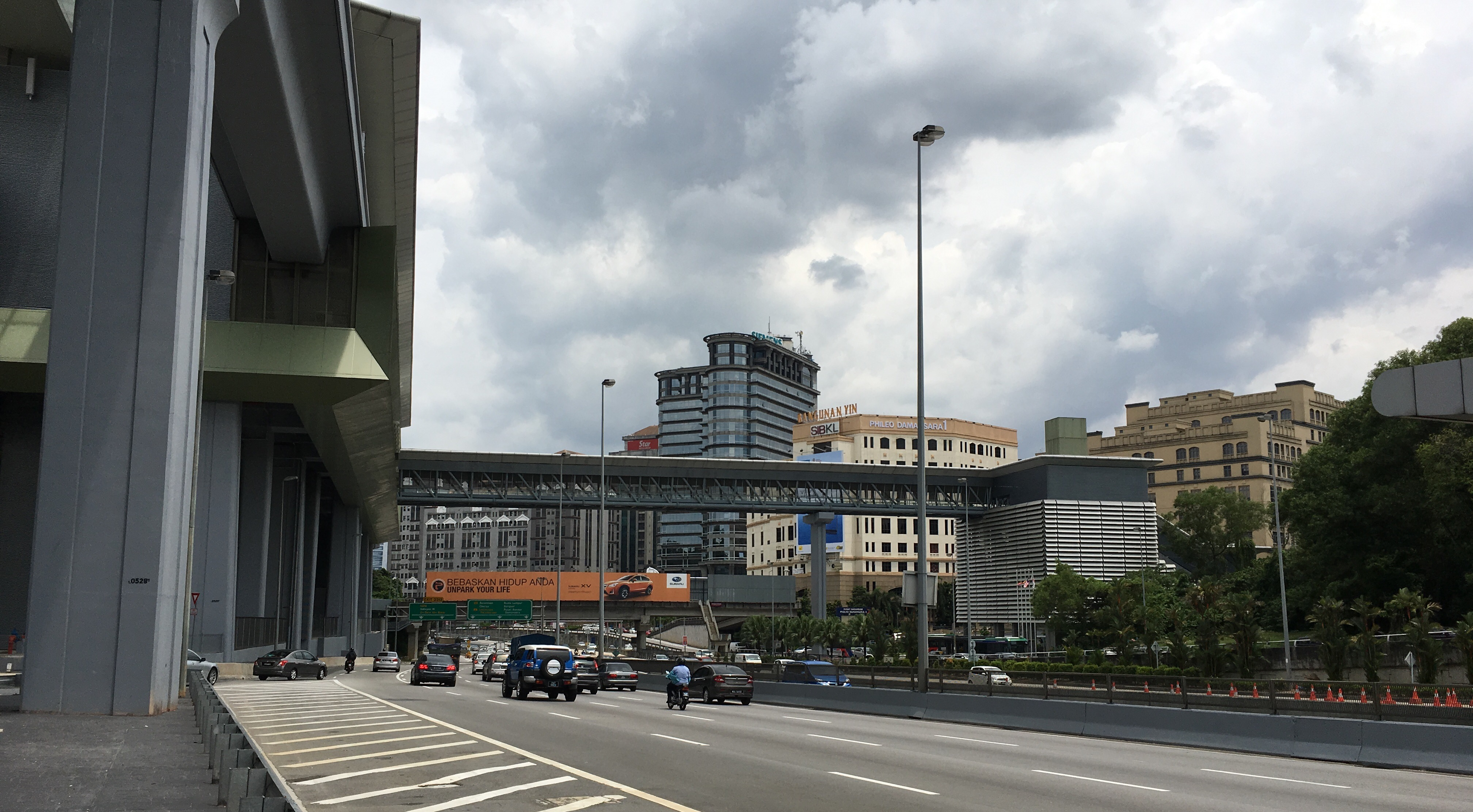
View of the pedestrian link bridge between the station and its entrance A

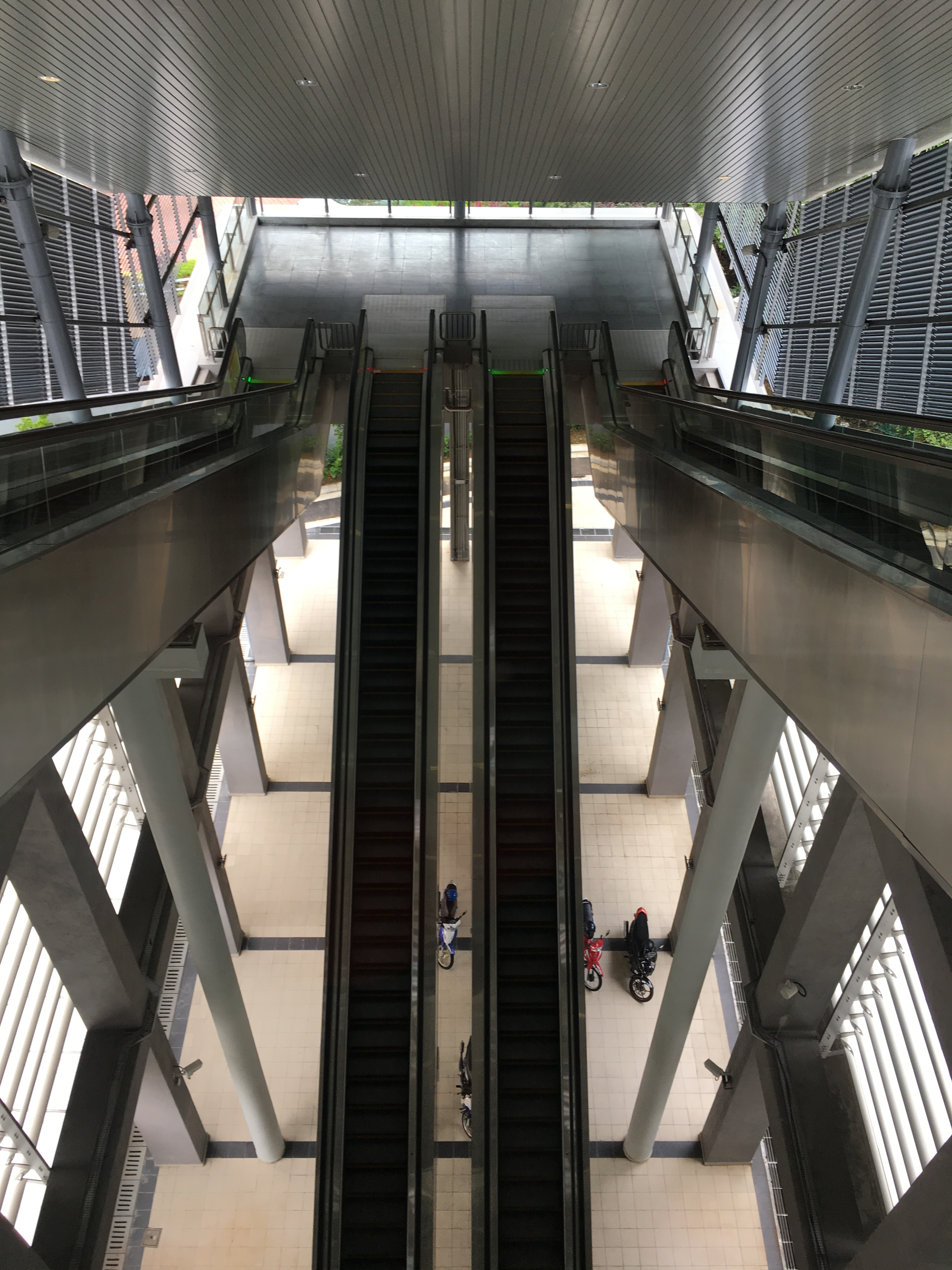
Escalators within the station's entrance A building

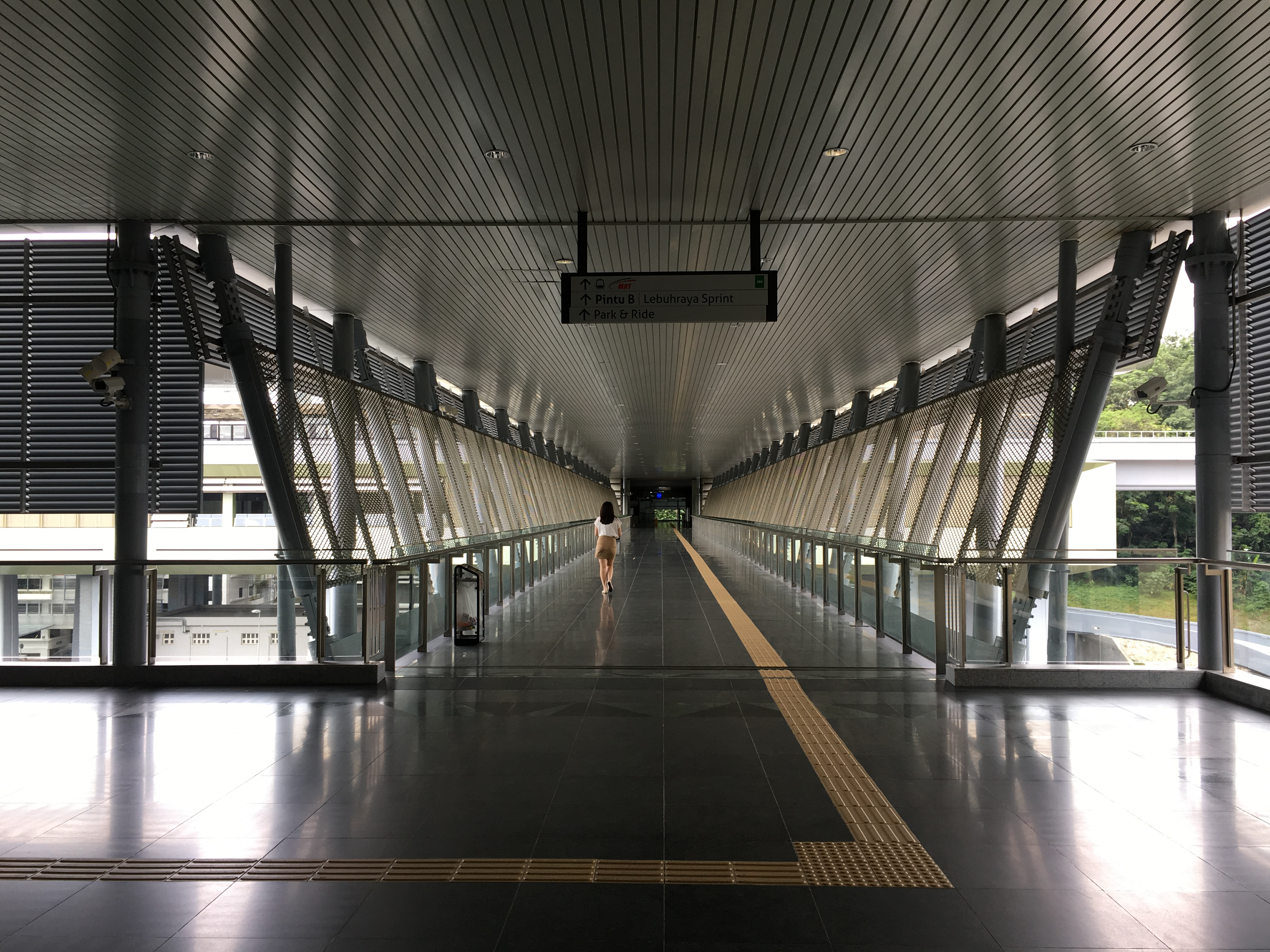
View of the pedestrian link bridge between the entrance A and the station

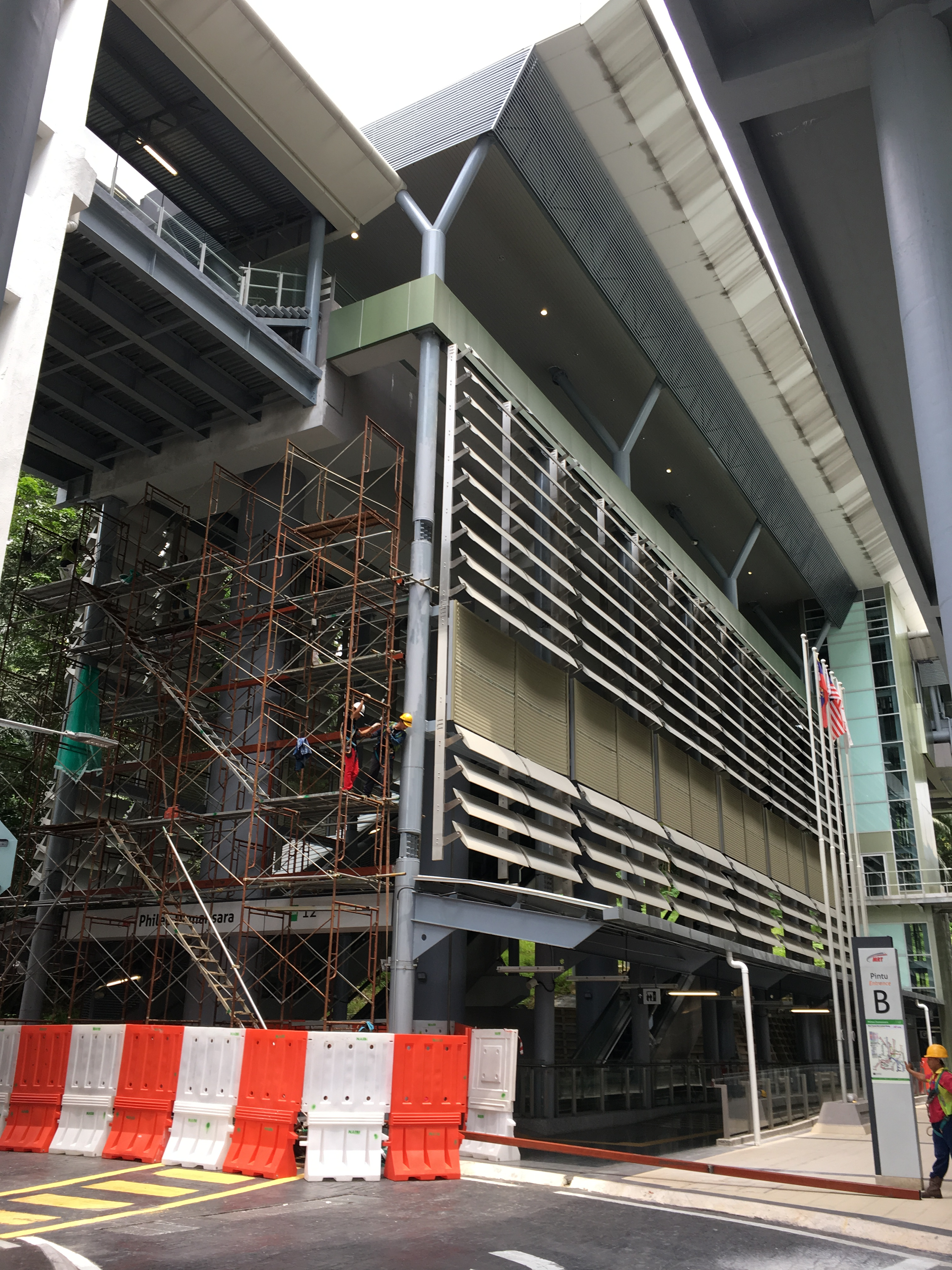
Entrance B of the station

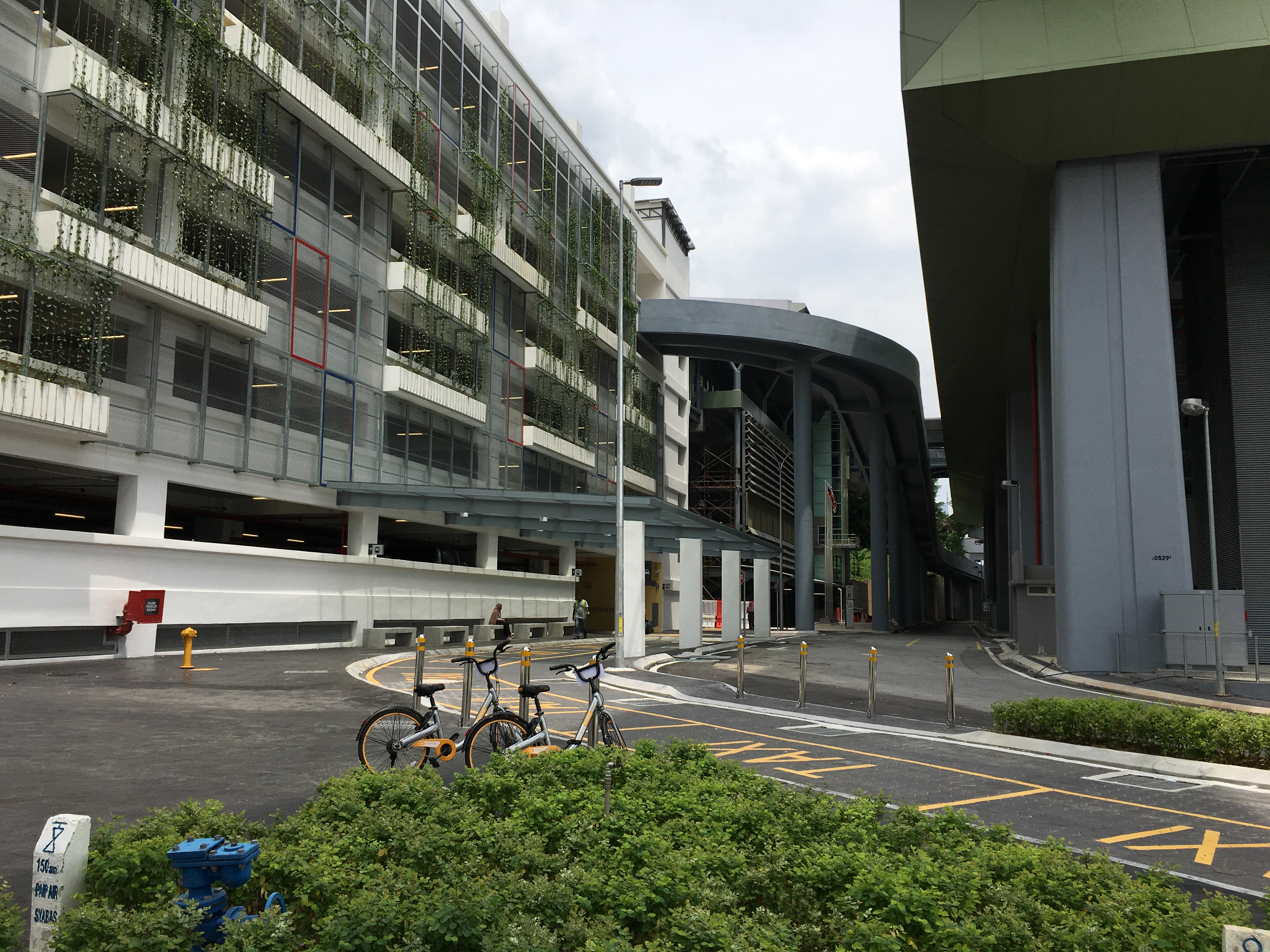
Approach to entrance B of the station, with the multi-storey park and ride building at left

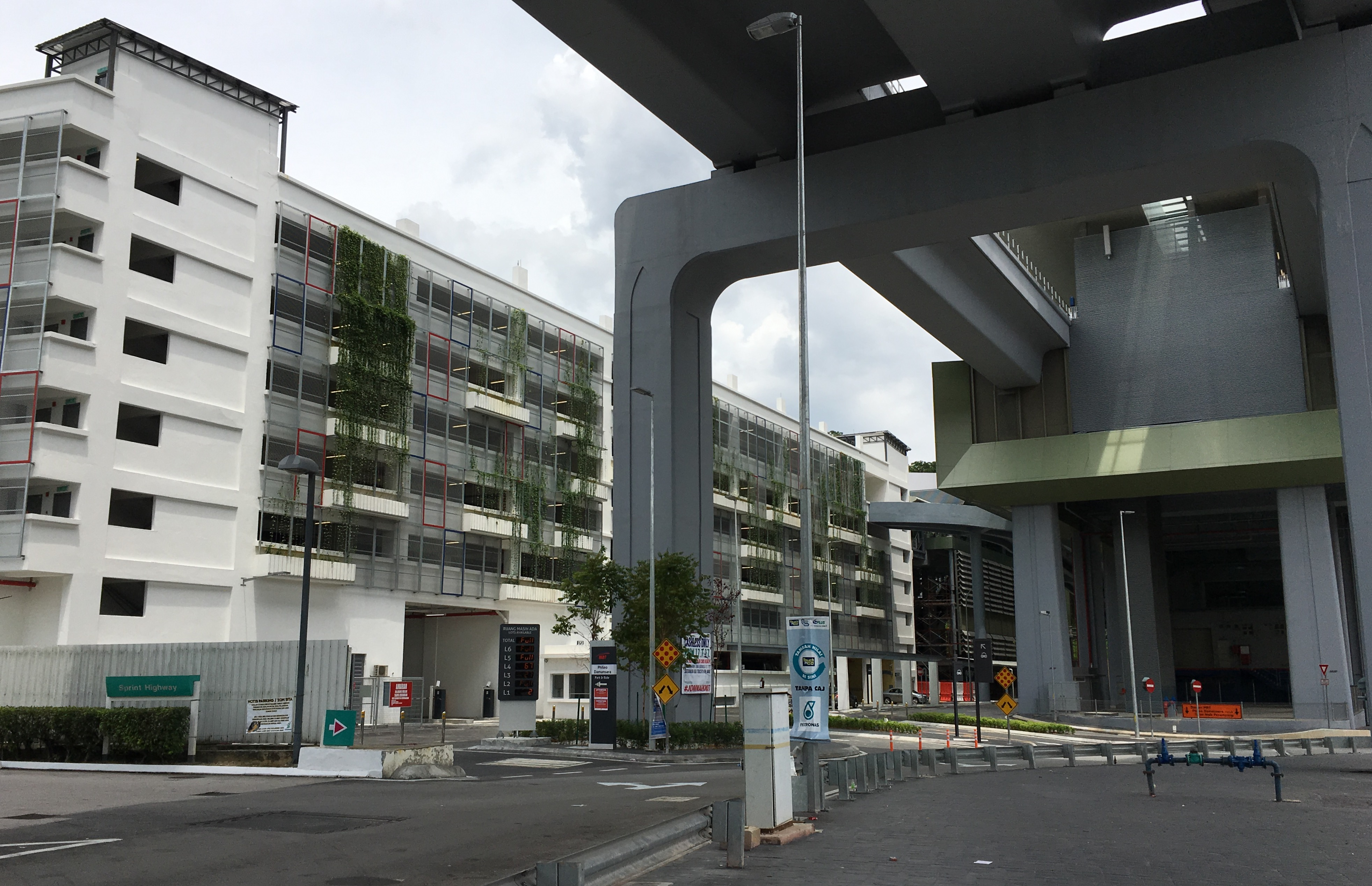
Phileo Damansara MRT station multi-storey park and ride building

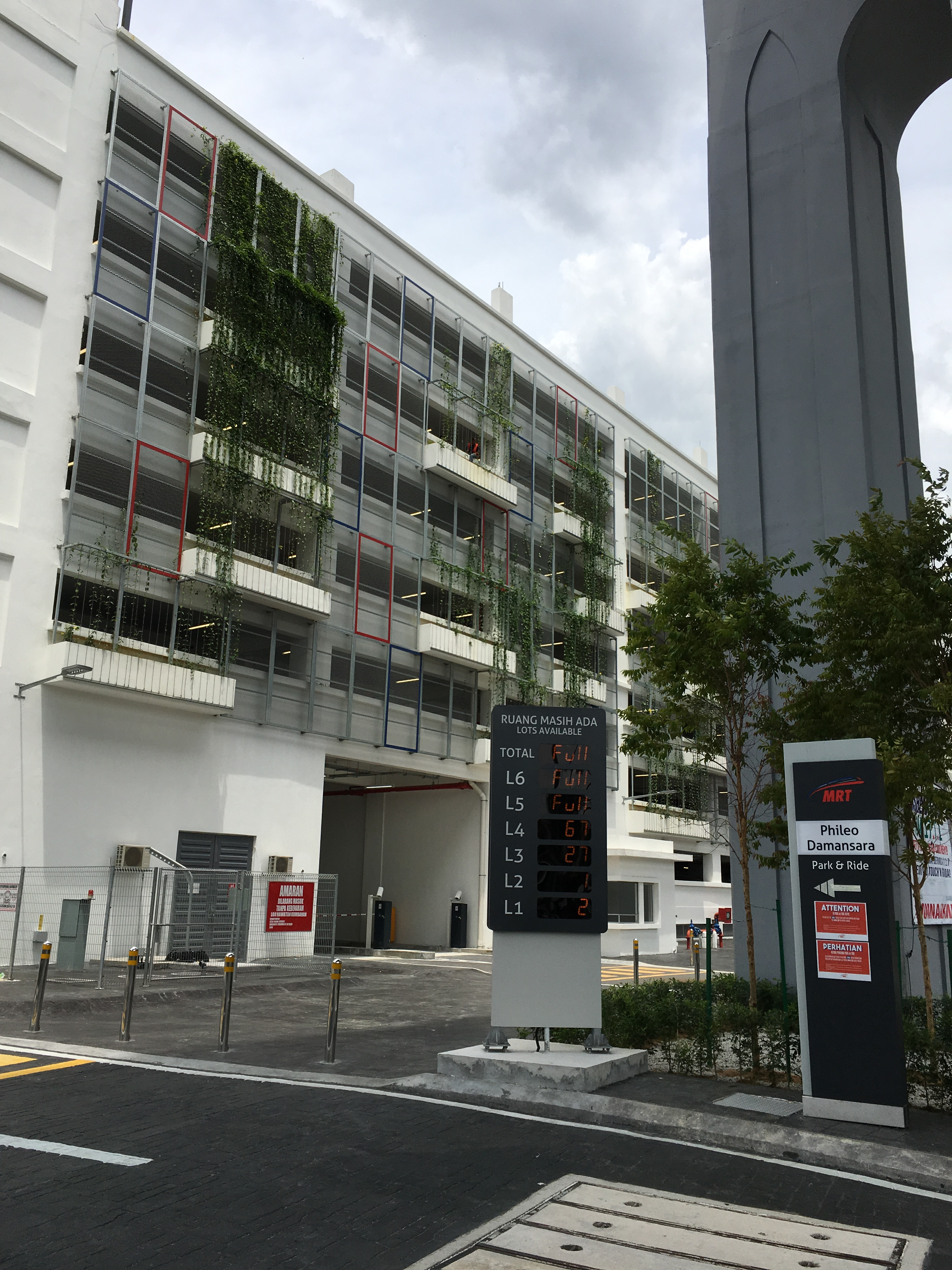
Electronic parking bay availability board at the entrance to the park and ride building
