= SMK Taman Tun Dr. Ismail =

- ( SMK TTDI )
- Kuala Lumpur, Federal Territory of Kuala Lumpur; Malaysia

Information
- Type: Government-aided non-boarding secondary school
- Motto: USAHA UNTUK KEJAYAAN (Malay)
- Established: 18 August 1980
- Status: Malaysian Smart School Type III
- School code: WEA0210
- Principal: Encik Mohd Haizir Bin Mohd Salleh
- Grades: Form 1 to Form 5
- Enrolment: ≈ 1 250
- Campus: Jalan Leong Yew Koh, Taman Tun Dr. Ismail, 60000 Kuala Lumpur
- Colours: Blue, red, white and yellow
- Affiliations: Ministry Of Education Malaysia
- Website: www.smkttdi.edu.my

Sekolah Menengah Kebangsaan Taman Tun Dr. Ismail (Taman Tun Dr. Ismail National Secondary School) or SMKTTDI is a secondary school located along Jalan Leong Yew Koh, in Taman Tun Dr. Ismail, a main township in Kuala Lumpur, Malaysia. It was founded in 1980.

== History ==
Taman Tun Dr Ismail is a township located on the outskirts of the city of Kuala Lumpur, Malaysia. Previously a plantation, the land was developed into a town starting in 1973. After the town became more populated, there was a need for a secondary school to be erected for the children of residents to continue their studies after Year 6. Hence, the Taman Tun Dr Ismail National Secondary School was established on the 18th of August 1980. The school logo was made by the Head Prefect of 1981, Halim Azhar bin Sulaiman. The school started as a government-funded secondary school and remains so to this day.

=== Principals ===
The first principal of SMKTTDI was Encik Zakaria B. Yahya, serving from 1980 to 1982. Subsequent principals are shown below:

Principal	Term of office
En. Zakaria B. Yahya	1980 - 1982
Pn. Kamarul Aini Bt. Hj Mohammad	1982 - 1985
En. Mohd Ashraf Mansor Hussain	1986 - 1987
Datin Norjah Bt. Ahmad	1987 - 1991
Pn. Salha Bt. Othman	1992-1995
Pn. Halimah Dato’ Ali	February 1995 - November 1995
Pn. Hjh. Noormah Bt. Suid	December 1995 - February 1998
Pn. Check Endah and Halimahton Bt. Yaacoob	February 1998 - June 1998
Datin Hjh. Khamisah Bt. Hj. Othman	July 1998 - January 2003
Datin Hjh. Hamidah Bt. Mohamed	April 2003 – October 2007
Datin Hjh. Hasmah Bt. Abu	January 2008 - 2016
Pn. Hjh. Majidah	-
Datin Foziah Bt. Ahmad	-
Pn. Hjh. Siti Nora Bt. Ali	2018 – February 2024
Tn. Mohd Haizir B. Mohd Saleh	March 2024 – now

It should be highlighted that En, Pn, Datin and Hjh are honorifics and titles, not part of the principal's name. Also, the terms of office for Majidah and Siti Nora Bt Ali were either not recorded or lost for reasons that haven't been disclosed.

== Enrollment ==
The enrollment was based on the students' performance in their Year 6 national examinations known as the Primary School Evaluation Test (UPSR), though after 2021, the tests were abolished. Currently, the Pentaksiran Berasaskan Sekolah (PBS) (School-Based Assignment) and end-year examinations are now the determining factor for student enrollment.

Classes in Forms 1 to 3 are separated based on multiple criteria, such as:

- Language of Medium for Mathematics and Science
- Type of Coordinated Living Skills Elective taken up
- Type of electives taken (Music, Visual Arts, Moral Studies, etc.)

Classes in Forms 4 and 5 are separated based on stream, whether Pure Science Stream or Arts Streams.

== Curriculum ==
SMKTTDI offers two curriculums, the Integrated Secondary School Curriculum (Kurikulum Bersepadu Sekolah Menengah) KBSM for Form 4-5 and the new curriculum (Kurikulum Standard Sekolah Menegah) KSSM. The KSSM will phase out the KBSM by the year 2021.

Students from Form 1 through Form 3 or the lower secondary forms will be studying 9 subjects as specified in the national curriculum. At the end of Form 3, students are required to take their End-of-Academic-Session Test (UASA) (Ujian Akhir Sesi Akedemik), as the Form 3 Assessment (PT3) (Pentaksiran Tingkatan 3) was abolished in 2022.

Upon the completion of the exams, students will enter Form 4 or the upper secondary forms and they will study the Pure Science or Arts stream consisting of nine subjects until Form 5 before sitting for the Malaysian Certificate of Education (SPM) (Sijil Pelajaran Malaysia) examinations at the end of their Form 5 study period (usually in November). Students in the upper forms have the option choosing from different packages of subjects depending on their Stream, interests and PBS results.

== Places ==
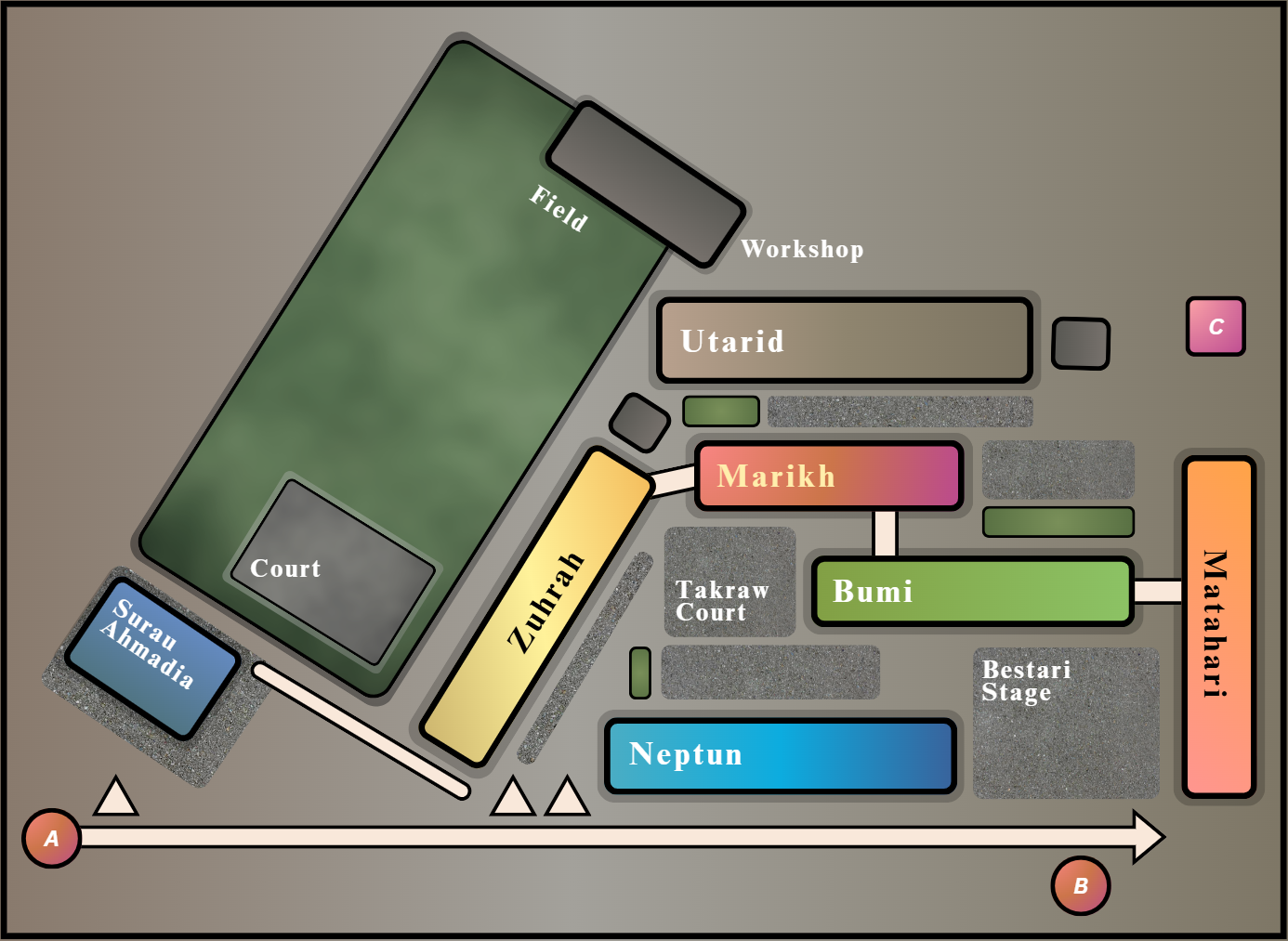
Simplified layout of the school, the bache lines denote block skywalks, pathways and concrete roads.

The school holds 6 primary blocks, a surau and a field bordering a dense wall of trees. The blocks' names are named after astronomical objects in the Solar System. Their names are Matahari, Zuhrah, Bumi, Marikh, Neptun and Utarid. The blocks are connected via skywalks excluding block Neptun which is isolated.

=== Gates ===
There are three gates, labelled Gate A, B and C. Gate A serves as the main entrance patrolled by the guard, allowing entry to vehicles to enter. Gate B is the supplementary gate, located at the far end of the school's sidewalk. Gate C leads to street 42 Jalan Athinahapan 1 and is prohibited for students to enter or exit though without certain exceptions.

Entering through Gate A leads to an upwards slope. Vehicles can turn left to reach Surau Ahmadiah or continue a bit further which splits, leading to either the parking lot adjacent to Open Halls or the Bestari Stage.

In July of 2025, the sidewalks stretching from Gate A to Gate B was roofed in response to parental complaints. Prior to construction, only a region extended 20m from Gate B was roofed and stayed that way for 15 years. The funds for the project were allocated by the DBKL (Kuala Lumpur City Hall).

== Classes ==
The school consists of 8 classes per form, totaling to 40 classes overall. Both lower and upper form classes receive different names which are named after famous polymaths, physicians, philosophers and thinkers. The class names does not play any role in subject priority or quality, solely existing as mere names. The class names are shown below:

Lower form class names
Class name	Eponym
Averroes	Named after polymath Ibn Rushd.
Avicenna	Named after polymath Ibn Sina.
Curie	Named after the Curie couple, Marie Curie and Pierre Curie.
Edison	Named after American inventor Thomas Edison.
Einstein	Named after theoretical physicist Albert Einstein.
Hazen	Vague, likely named after Ibn al-Haytham (following the common pattern of Muslim eponyms).
Newton	Named after Isaac Newton.
Rhazes	Named after physician Abu Bakr al-Razi.

All upper form classes inherit Muslim eponyms which are not latinized.

Upper form class names
Class name	Eponym
Battani	Named after astronomer Al-Battani.
Biruni	Named after scholar Al-Biruni.
Farabi	Named after philosopher Al-Farabi.
Ghazali	Named after polymath Al-Ghazali
Jazari	Named after inventor Ismail al-Jazari.
Karaji	Named after mathematician Al-Karaji
Khawarizmi	Named after mathematician Al-Khwarizmi
Zahrawi	Named after chemist Al-Zahrawi.

== See also ==
- Official website
- Lagu Rasmi Sekolah (School's Official Song)
