= Bukit Kiara Selatan MRT station =

Rapid transit station in Malaysia

KG12A CC01 Bukit Kiara Selatan

General information
- Location: Damansara Link, Bukit Kiara, Kuala Lumpur; Malaysia
- Coordinates: 3°8′2.35″N 101°39′4.86″E
- System: | Future MRT station
- Owner: MRT Corp
- Lines: 9 Kajang; 13 Circle
- Tracks: 4

Construction
- Structure type: Elevated
- Parking: Not available
- Cycle facilities: Not available

Other information
- Status: Planning
- Station code: KG12A CC01

History
- Opening: 2027 (Kajang Line); 2032 (Circle Line)

Services
Preceding station		Following station
Phileo Damansara towards Kwasa Damansara	Kajang Line Future service	Pusat Bandar Damansara towards Kajang
Bukit Kiara Clockwise / outer	Circle Line Future service	UM Anticlockwise / inner
Location

The Bukit Kiara Selatan MRT station, previously known as the Bukit Kiara MRT Station, is a future mass rapid transit (MRT) station on the MRT Circle Line and MRT Kajang Line. The proposed site for the station will be located in between Phileo Damansara and Pusat Bandar Damansara stations. The station is expected to be built as an interchange for both of the lines with constructions slated to begin in 2023. It will be an elevated station under the working name of Bukit Kiara South.

== Location ==
Bukit Kiara South station is planned to be to the south of the Bukit Kiara suburban area, where it would serve nearby administration buildings, convention centers, a small residential community, sports complexes and the Royal Selangor Club. The station location is also within the reach of the Medan Damansara residential area.

== History ==
In 2006, initial plans were to construct an LRT line from Kota Damansara to Cheras, serving areas such as TTDI, Section 17, Section 16 and Bukit Damansara which are near Bukit Kiara. The planned termini have since been extended to Sungai Buloh and Kajang in 2009 to provide a convenient interchange to the KTM lines and to boost development in Sungai Buloh. In 2010, the line plan has been altered to be a rapid transit line which costs RM36 billion.

After the 2011 public displays, it was announced that Bukit Kiara is to be a future station, located between Phileo Damansara and Pusat Bandar Damansara stations. Construction began on the MRT line in 2012 with marks placed along the tracks for the future station site. The first phase of the line opened on 16 December 2016 which skips the site.

The MRT Circle Line was planned with an interchange here, between Pusat Sains Negara and PPUM stations. However, it was scrapped in May 2018 due to shortage of funds.

A revival was then announced in November 2020 for the MRT Circle Line project, with plans to build the Bukit Kiara MRT station along with other stations for the loop line. Constructions are expected to begin in 2023 and it will be opening in stages, starting with Phase 1 which will include Bukit Kiara. Based on the latest update, the station is expected to open in 2032.

== Planned services ==
The MRT Kajang Line is currently having a typical frequency of 7 to 9 minutes during off-peak hours, equivalent to 6 to 9 trains per hour (tph). Trains run non-stop between Phileo Damansara and Pusat Bandar Damansara where it is nearer to the former.
