= Taman Tun Dr Ismail MRT station =

MRT station in Taman Tun Dr Ismail, Kuala Lumpur, Malaysia

KG10 Taman Tun Dr Ismail – Deloitte
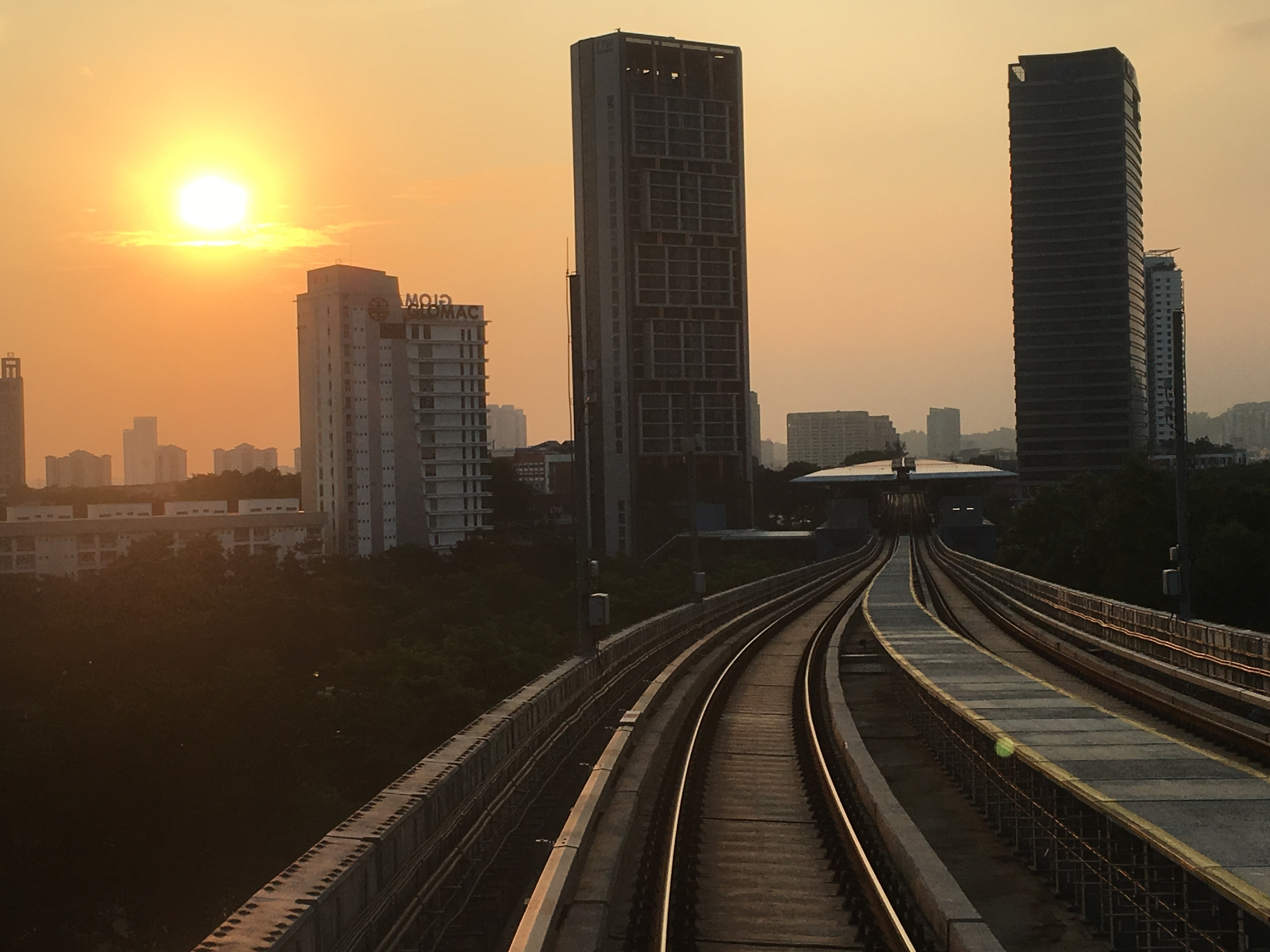
- Evening view of the Taman Tun Dr Ismail station.

General information
- Other names: Malay: تامن تون دوکتور إسماعيل (Jawi); Chinese: 敦依斯迈花园; Tamil: தாமான் துன் டாக்டர் இசுமாயில்
- Location: Jalan Damansara, Taman Tun Dr Ismail; 60000 Kuala Lumpur; Malaysia
- Coordinates: 3°8′9.92″N 101°37′50.76″E
- System: Rapid KL
- Owner: MRT Corp
- Operator: Rapid Rail
- Line: 9 Kajang Line
- Platforms: 2 side platforms
- Tracks: 2

Construction
- Structure type: Elevated
- Parking: Not available
- Cycle facilities: Available. 23 bicycle bays.
- Accessible: Yes

Other information
- Station code: KG10

History
- Opened: 16 December 2016; 9 years ago

Services
Preceding station		Following station
Bandar Utama towards Kwasa Damansara	Kajang Line	Phileo Damansara towards Kajang
Location

The Taman Tun Dr Ismail (TTDI) MRT station, also known as Taman Tun Dr Ismail-Deloitte or TTDI-Deloitte under the station naming rights programme, is a mass rapid transit station on the MRT Kajang Line serving the suburb of Taman Tun Dr Ismail, Kuala Lumpur and Damansara Utama, Petaling Jaya, Selangor, Malaysia.

Plans for the station's location were revised twice, after two earlier locations received objections during the public display of the line (mandatory under existing laws). The original planned location of the station was next to the TTDI fire station, which was objected by nearby residents. This forced Prasarana Malaysia (project owner of the MRT line prior to the establishment of MRT Corp) to propose shifting it next to the TTDI Wet Market, some 300 metres away. This too was not popular, and the majority of objections came from residents of Jalan SS20/10 in Damansara Kim across the Damansara-Puchong Expressway (LDP). The fear was that parking along the road and in the area would be congested by future MRT users.

The third and final location necessitated the acquisition of two Caltex petrol stations on each side of the elevated station. There was also a small plot of land that would have been the site of a multi-storey park and ride (MSPR) building. The MSPR was included in the approved plan, but MRT Corp later sought the approval of the Land Public Transport Authority (SPAD) to remove the MSPR. The odd shape of the small plot available meant that the number of bays was small (less than 120 bays), making the cost per bay too high. The allotted bays were then added to the Phileo Damansara station MSPR.

The station was opened on 16 December 2016 under Phase One operations of the line.

== Station features ==
=== Station location ===
The station adopts the standard elevated station design of the MRT Kajang Line with two side platforms located above the concourse level. The station is located directly above Jalan Damansara and its support columns are located along the median of the road, and directly on the Selangor-Kuala Lumpur state border.

=== Station layout ===
L2	Platform Level	Side platform
L2	Platform Level	Platform 1: 9 Kajang Line towards KG35 Kajang (→)
L2	Platform Level	Platform 2: 9 Kajang Line towards KG04 Kwasa Damansara (←)
L2	Platform Level	Side platform
L1	Concourse	Faregates, ticketing machines; customer service office; station control; convenience store
G	Ground Level	Entrances A and B with feeder bus stop, taxi lay-bys and private vehicle lay-bys

=== Exits and entrances ===
The station has two entrances, built on land which were previously petrol stations, and are located on both sides of Jalan Damansara. Feeder bus stops are located at both entrances.

Kajang Line station
Entrance	Location	Destination	Picture
A	West side of Jalan Damansara	Feeder bus stop, taxi and private vehicle lay-by, TTDI Ascencia, Menara Glomac, Glo Damansara, KPJ Damansara Medical Centre	
B	East side of Jalan Damansara	Taxi and private vehicle lay-by, Jalan Wan Kadir 3, Jalan Wan Kadir 4, TTDI Plaza, Menara LGB, The Residence, TTDI Market	

=== Retail outlet ===
The station formerly had a FamilyMart convenience store, which was located at the unpaid section of the station concourse level.

In late 2025, a myNEWS convenience store branch had been opened in place of the aforementioned FamilyMart store.

== Feeder bus services ==
With the opening of the MRT Kajang Line, feeder buses also began operating linking the station with several residential areas in Taman Tun Dr Ismail, Damansara Utama and Damansara Jaya. The feeder buses operate from the station's feeder bus stops at both entrances of the station.

Route No.	Origin	Desitination	Via
T813	KG10 Taman Tun Dr Ismail (Entrance A)	Damansara Jaya (SS22)	Jalan Damansara; Damansara–Puchong Expressway; Jalan SS21/56; Jalan SS21/1; Sprint Expressway; Jalan SS22/23; Jalan SS22/43; Jalan SS22/41
T814	KG10 Taman Tun Dr Ismail (Entrance B)	Taman Tun Dr Ismail	Jalan Wan Kadir 5 Jalan Dato Sulaiman; Persiaran Zaaba; Jalan Burhanuddin Helmi 2 Jalan Athinahappan; Damansara–Puchong Expressway; Sprint Expressway

== Gallery ==
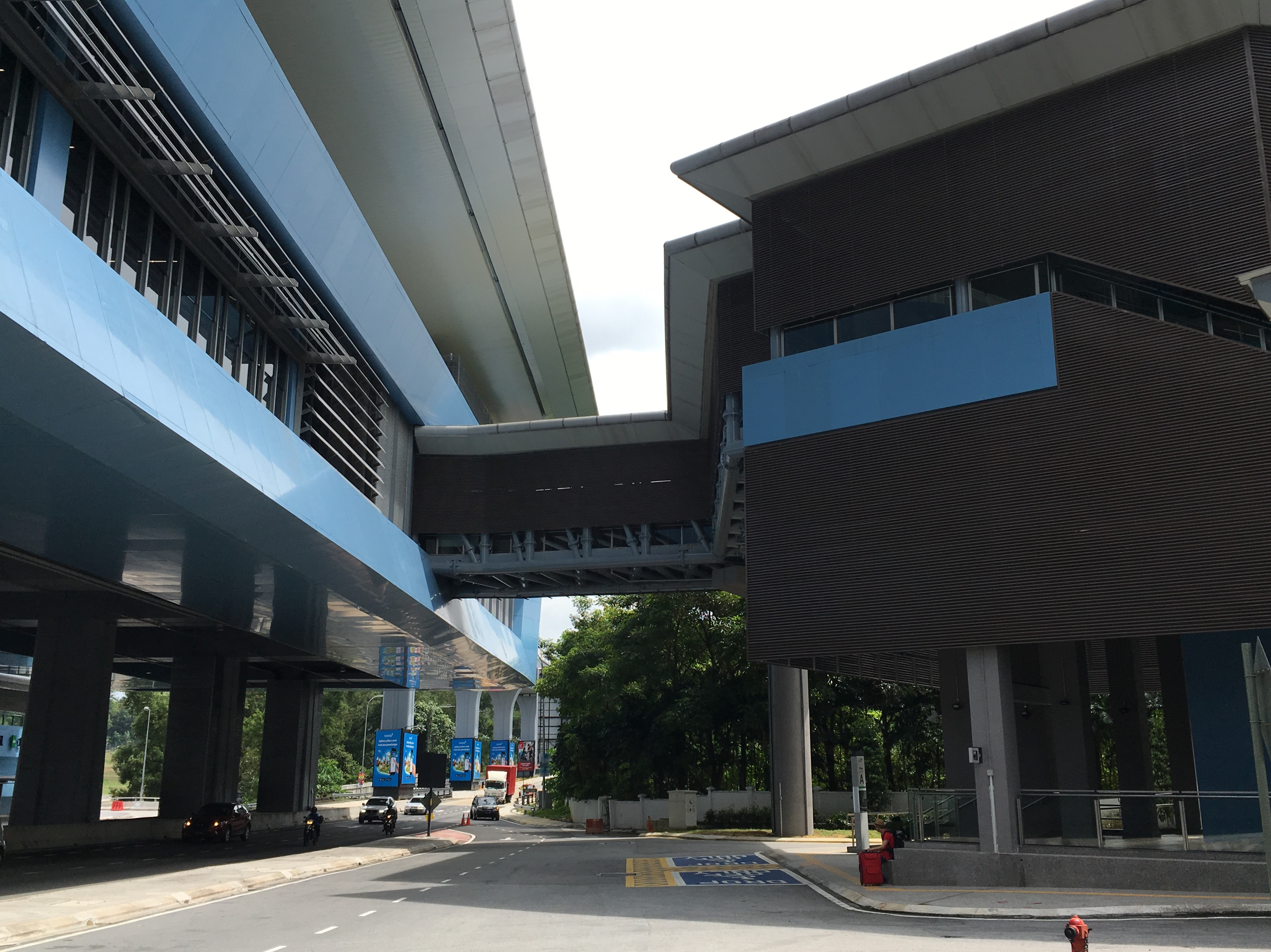
Entrance A to the station above Jalan Damansara

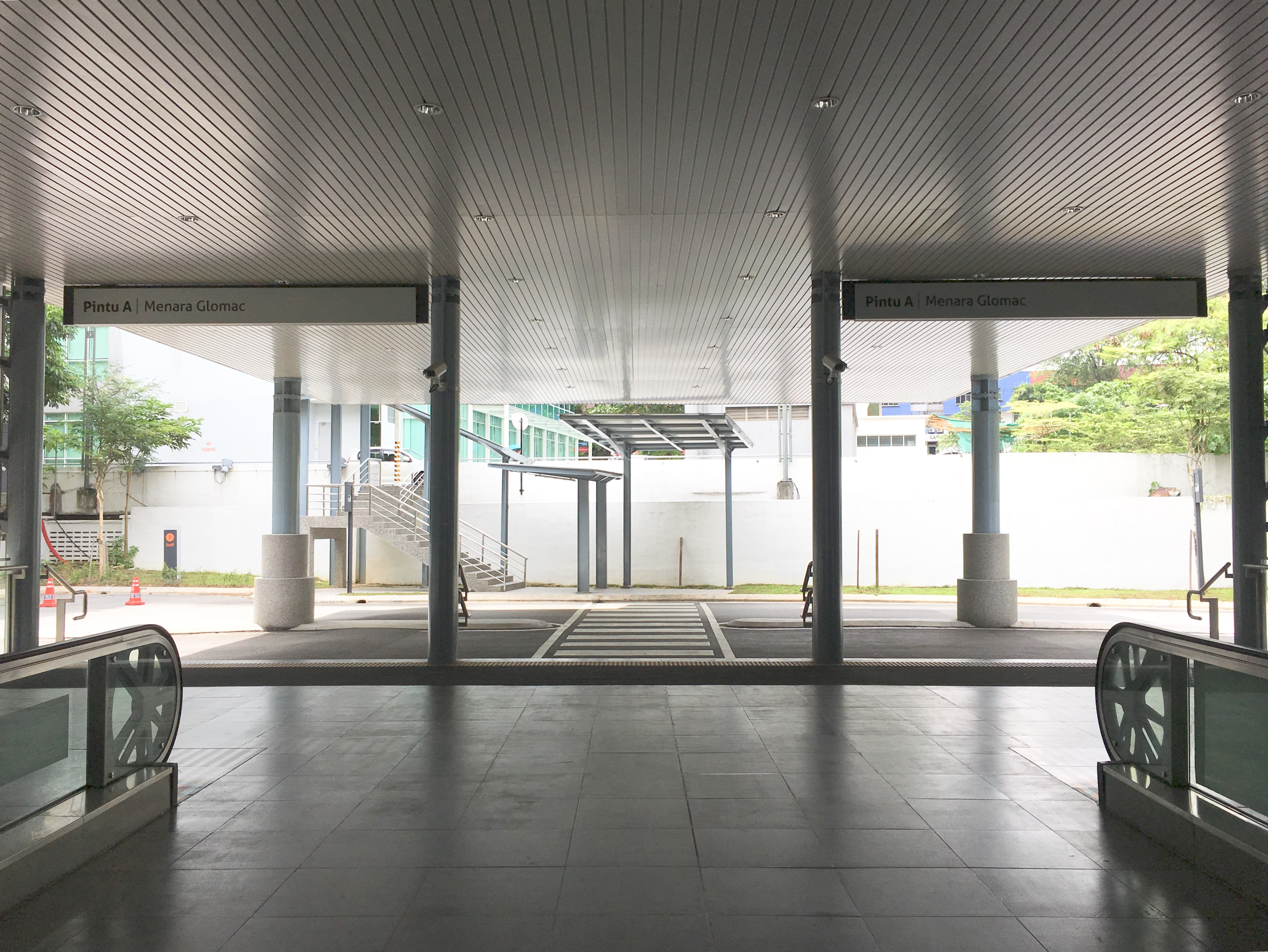
Access to Glo Damansara

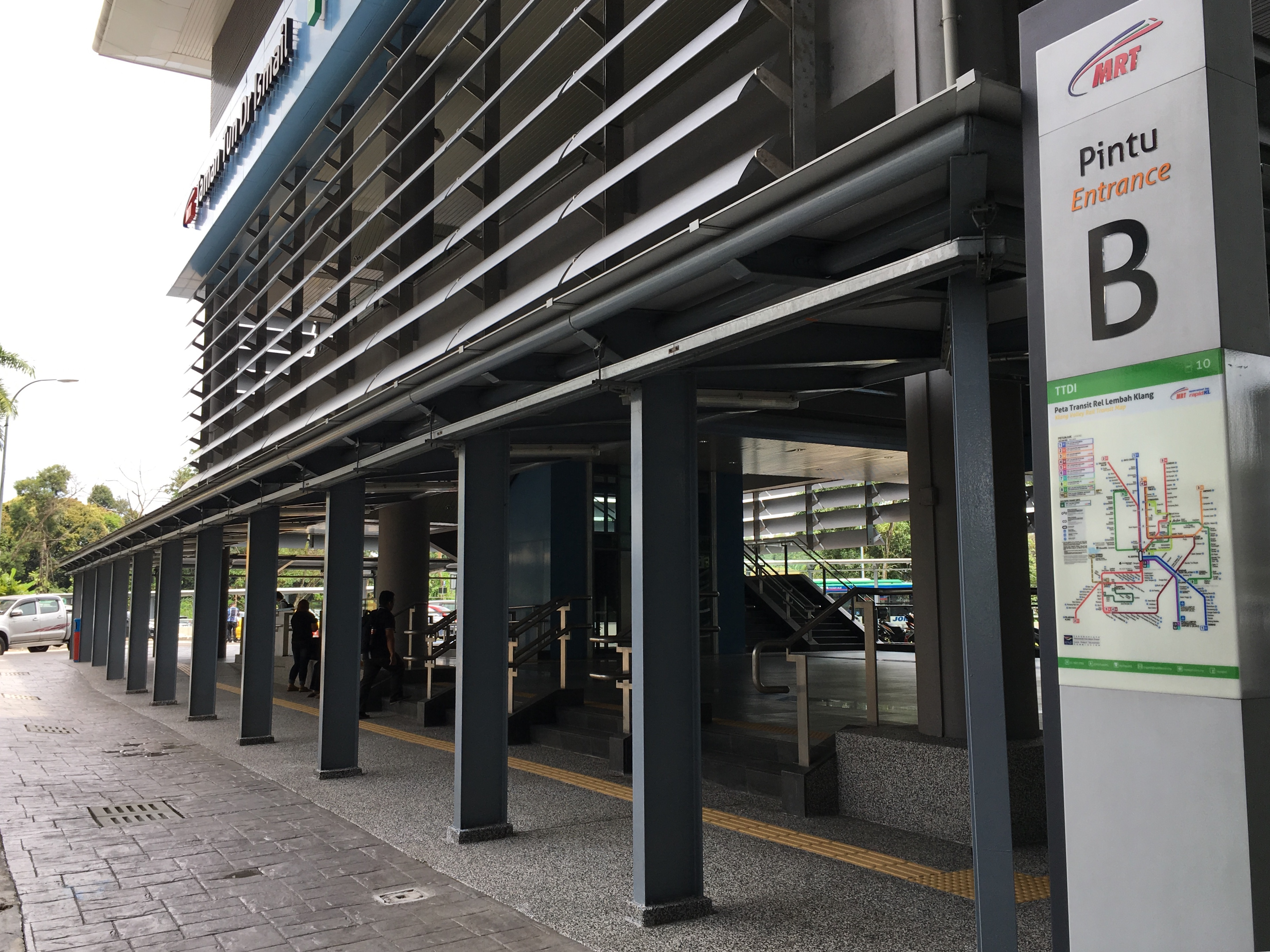
Entrance B by Jalan Wan Kadir 4

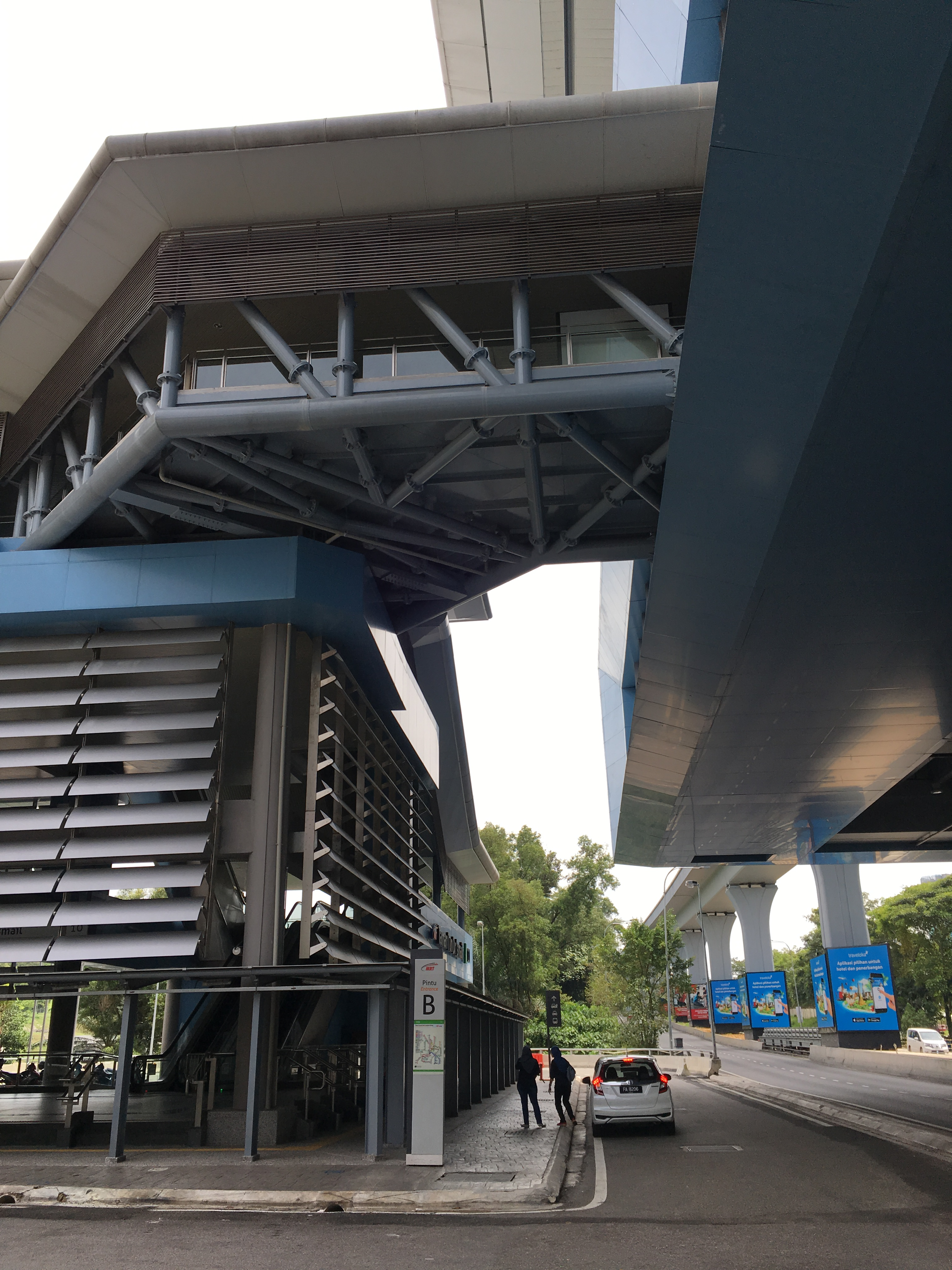
Entrance B to the station

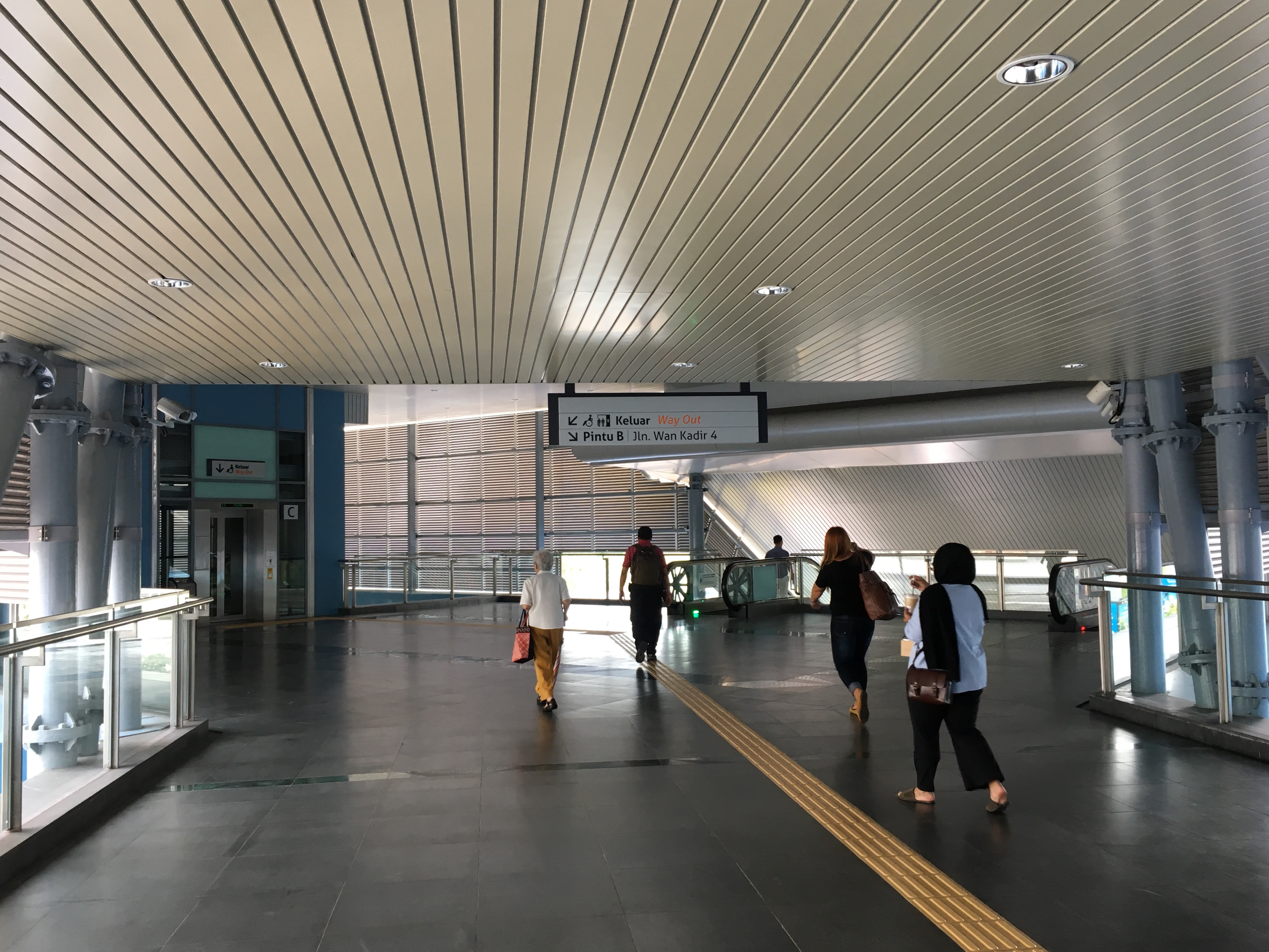
Entrance B at the concourse level

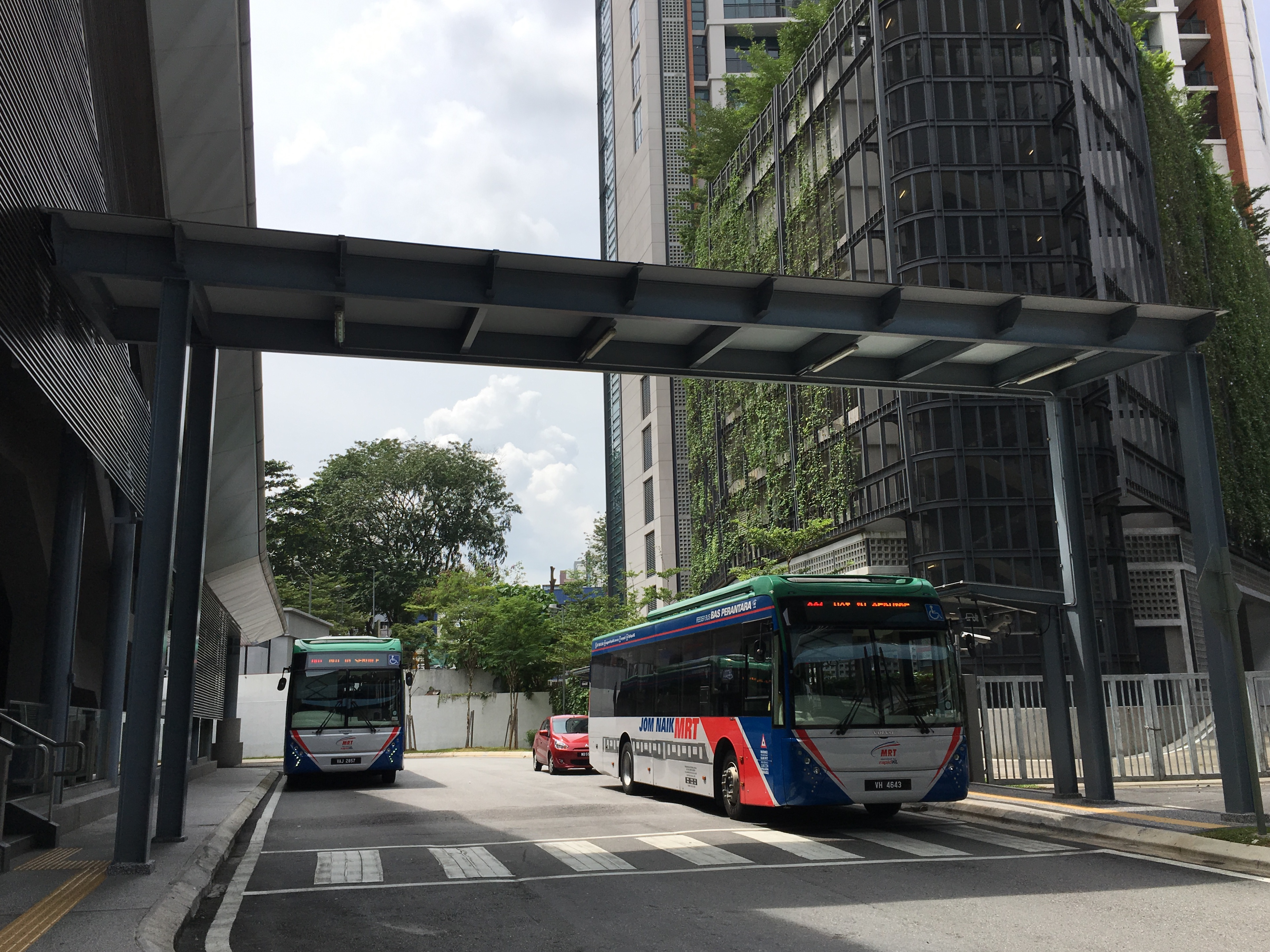
Feeder buses at Entrance A

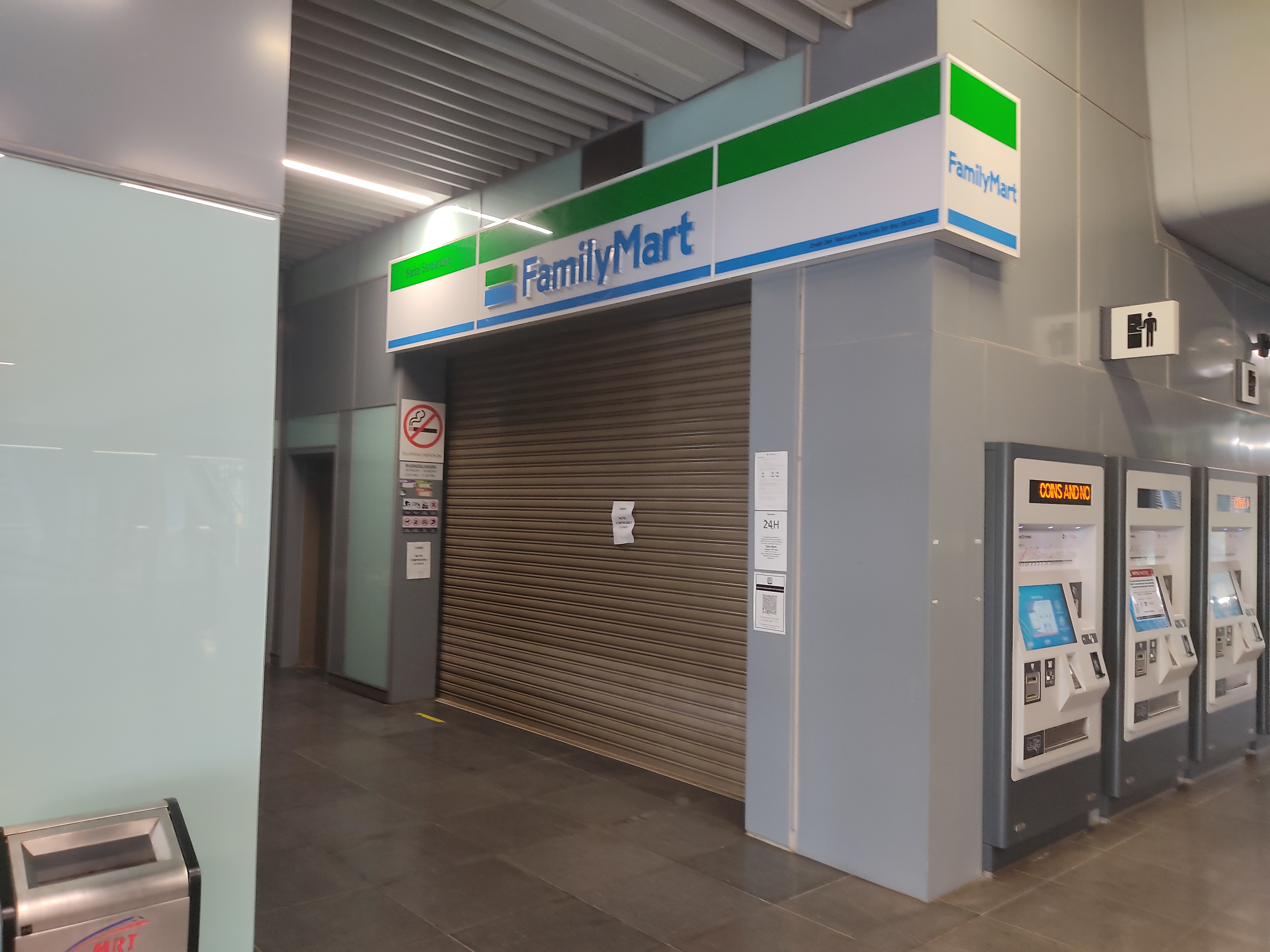
Former FamilyMart store in the concourse level of the station

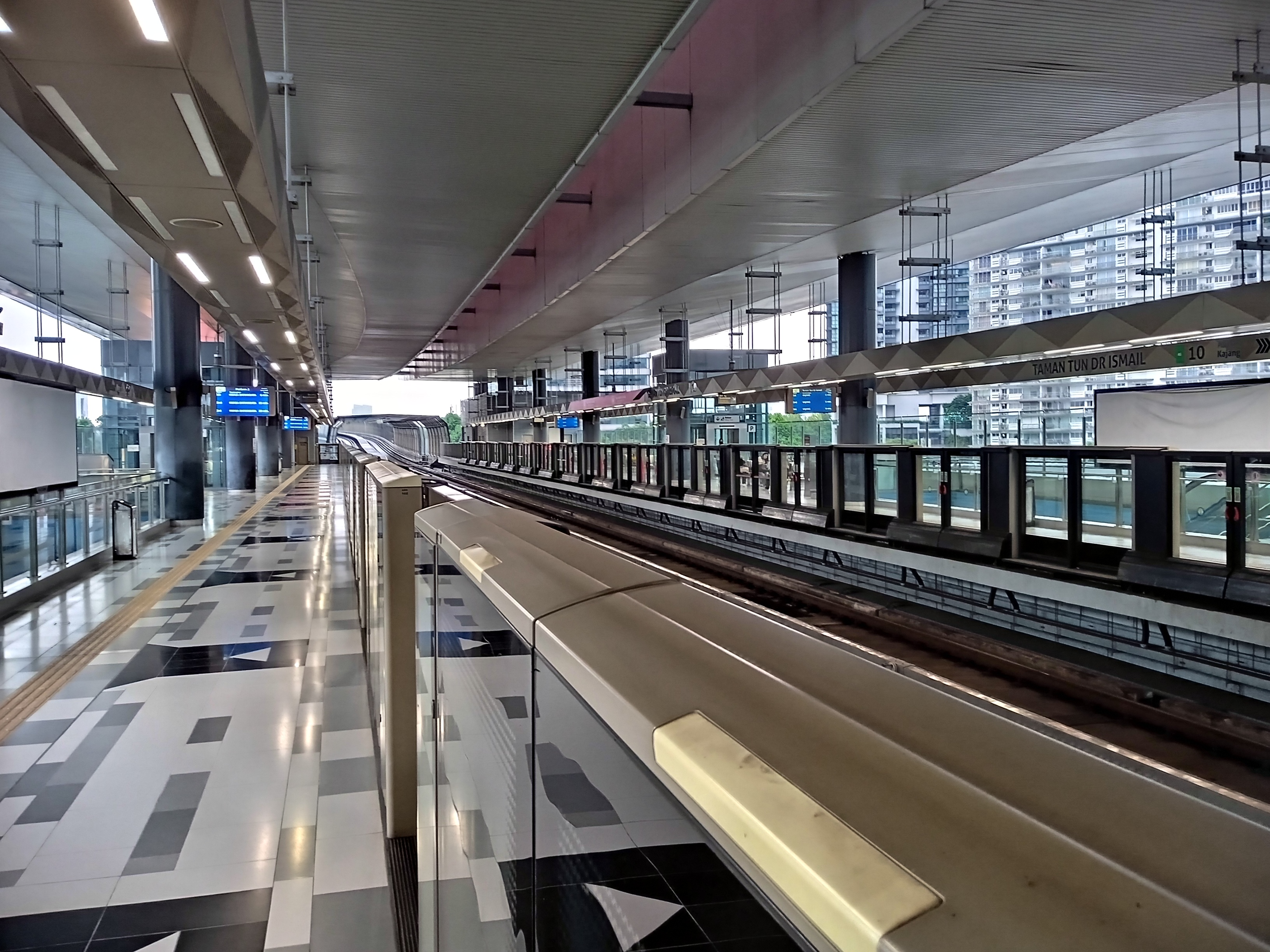
Kajang Line platform at the station

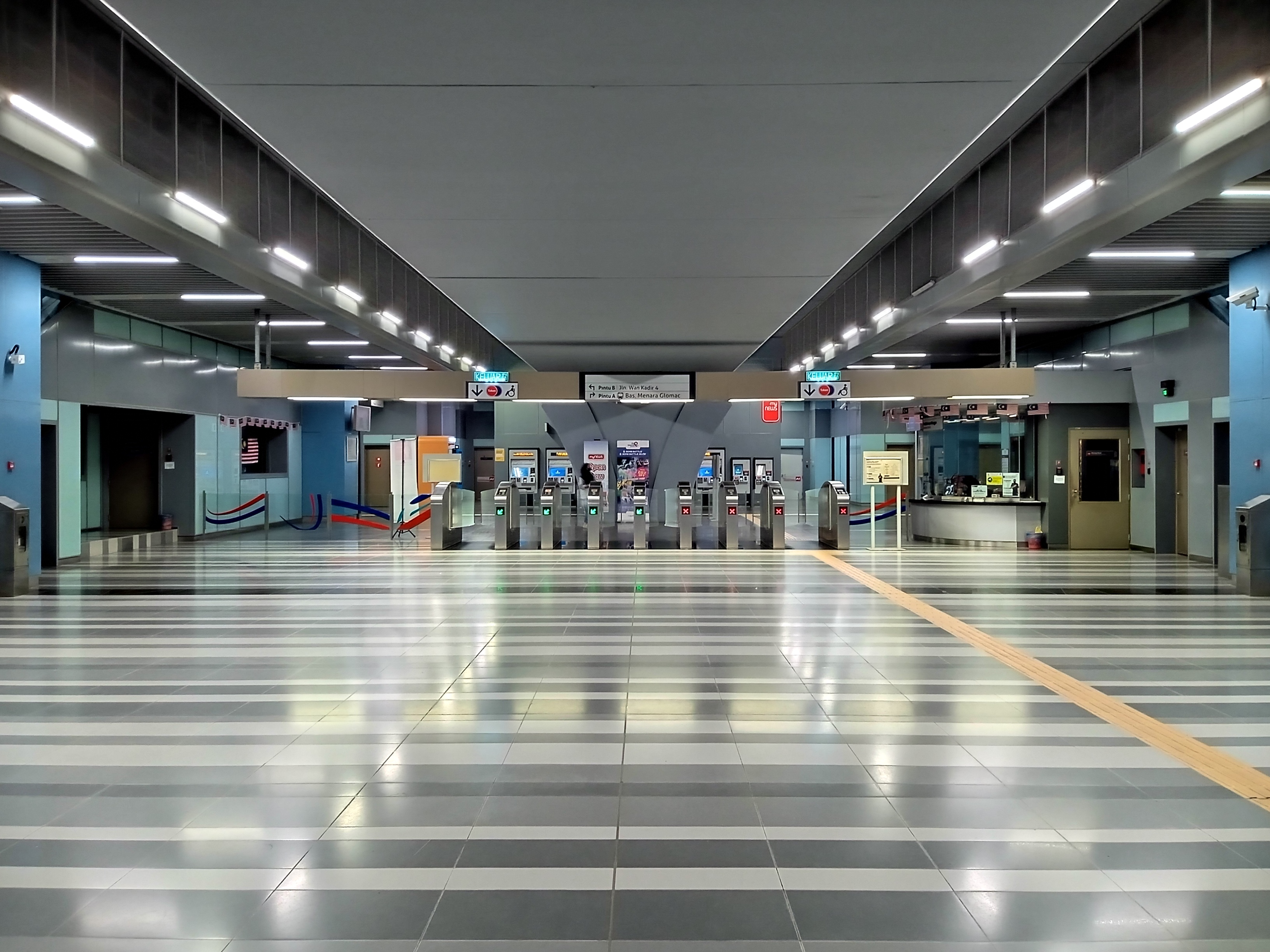
Station concourse

== See also ==
- Kajang Line
- Taman Tun Dr Ismail
- Damansara Utama
