= VADS Berhad =

- Company type: Private Limited Company
- Industry: IT services
- Founded: 1990
- Headquarters: Plaza VADS, 15th Floor, No. 1, Jalan Tun Mohd. Fuad, Taman Tun Dr Ismail, 60000 Kuala Lumpur, Malaysia
- Key people: Zamzamzairani Mohd Isa, Chairman; Massimo Migliuolo, Executive Director & Chief Executive Officer
- Products: Managed Network Service; BPO
- Parent: Telekom Malaysia
- Website: www.vads.com

VADS Berhad was formed in 1991 as a joint venture between Telekom Malaysia and IBM to take advantage of the convergence of IT and Telecommunications Industry. The company officially started operations the following year. Two other partners joined in the venture in 1993 and 1995, namely Permodalan Nasional Berhad (PNB) and The Employees Provident Fund (EPF) respectively.

Its main activities are Managed Networks Services, Contact Center Services and Systems Integration Services.

VADS was listed on the Kuala Lumpur Stock Exchange on 7 August 2002 — making it the first Telekom Malaysia Berhad (Telekom Malaysia) subsidiary to be listed. VADS is a member of the TM group of companies.
