= Circle Line (Kuala Lumpur) =

3rd MRT in Malaysia

MRT Circle Line
- 13
- Location of the proposed Dutamas station on the MRT3 Circle Line near MITEC, photographed in November 2026

Overview
- Other name: MRT3, MRT Line 3
- Native name: MRT Laluan Lingkaran
- Status: Land acquisition in progress
- Owner: MRT Corp
- Line number: 13 (Blue violet)
- Locale: Klang Valley
- Termini: CC01 Bukit Kiara Selatan; CC33 UM
- Stations: 33 (30 active, 3 provisional)
- Website: www.mymrt.com.my

Service
- Type: Rapid transit
- System: Rapid KL; Klang Valley Integrated Transit System
- Services: Circle route
- Operator: Rapid Rail
- Depot(s): Kampung Puah Depot; Taman Midah Depot
- Rolling stock: 4-car i-MRT trainsets Width: TBC - wide profile Length: 74.86 m (245.6 ft)

History
- Work began: 2027 (expected)
- Planned opening: 2032 (expected)

Technical
- Line length: 51.6 km (32.1 mi); Elevated: 39.7 km (24.7 mi); Underground: 11.9 km (7.4 mi)
- Track gauge: 1,435 mm (4 ft 8 1/2 in) standard gauge
- Electrification: 750 V DC third rail
- Conduction system: Automated and driverless
- Operating speed: 100 km/h (62 mph)
Route map
MRT3 Official Map

Proposed route for the MRT Circle Line as of September 2024. Black: Underground alignment Blue violet: Elevated alignment

The MRT Circle Line, also known as MRT 3, is a proposed thirteenth rail transit line, the third Mass Rapid Transit line and the fifth fully automated and driverless rail system in the Klang Valley region of Malaysia. Once completed, this line would form the first loop line of the Klang Valley Integrated Transit System.

On 17 July 2025, the Minister of Transport approved the Final Railway Scheme for the project. Following a review of the feedback from the 2024 Public Inspection, the project adopted an "Intermediate MRT" (i-MRT) system technology with shorter 4-car trainsets and tighter turning radii to significantly reduce land acquisition. The line is currently in the land acquisition phase with construction expected to begin in 2027 and the line scheduled to be fully operational by 2032.

The circle line will be numbered 13 and coloured blue violet on official transit maps.

== History ==
=== Proposal and cancellation ===
In August 2016, MRT Corp announced that it expected to submit the study on the MRT Line 3 to the government by the end of the year. This was followed by a statement on 6 September 2017 by Transport Minister Datuk Seri Liow Tiong Lai, who indicated that plans were being drawn up to fast-track the construction of MRT 3 for completion before 2027. On 27 October 2017, during the announcement of Budget 2018, Prime Minister Najib Razak reiterated this intention by proposing that MRT 3 be completed before 2025. Subsequently, on 3 January 2018, former CEO of Rapid Rail, Dato' Ir. Zohari Sulaiman, was appointed as project director by MRT Corp to oversee the development. However, following the change of government after the 2018 Malaysian general election, newly appointed Prime Minister Mahathir Mohamad announced the cancellation of the MRT 3 project on 30 May 2018 due to fiscal constraints. Two days later, on 1 June 2018, Dato' Sri Shahril Mokhtar, CEO of MRT Corp, stated that the decision was understandable given the financial situation, but emphasised the importance of completing MRT 3 in the future to "close all the loops".

=== Review and revival ===
Momentum was revived on 23 December 2019 when Transport Minister Anthony Loke confirmed that a review of MRT 3 was under way. The project received Cabinet approval on 3 April 2021, with construction slated to begin in the second half of the year. On 13 April 2021, it was revealed that the line would feature around 30 stations and 10 interchanges, forming a circular alignment from Bukit Kiara (Note: The station has been renamed as Bukit Kiara Selatan station, while there is a separate station on the Circle Line called Bukit Kiara station.) to the University Malaya Medical Centre (UMMC). The line would be built in five phases over ten years. On 6 August 2021, MRT Corp issued a letter to the Mayor of Kuala Lumpur regarding Environmental Impact Assessment (EIA) and Strategic Impact Assessment (SIA) studies to be conducted by ERE Consulting Group between June and December 2021. Later, on 24 September 2021, CEO Mohd Zarif Mohd Hashim stated at City Expo Malaysia (CEM) that the MRT Circle Line would connect all eight radial lines in Klang Valley and serve as the backbone of a more integrated transport network. On 4 March 2022, then Prime Minister Ismail Sabri confirmed the Cabinet's approval for the reimplementation of MRT 3. A media briefing on 15 March 2022 clarified that the project would consist of 51 km (31.7 mi) of track; 40 km (24.9 mi) elevated and 11 km (6.8 mi) underground, operating in a circular alignment with the first phase opening in 2028 and full completion by 2030.

In the 2023 Budget, Prime Minister Anwar Ibrahim, who also serves as Finance Minister, announced that the government would re-evaluate MRT 3's total expenditure with a target to reduce the cost below RM45 billion. Meanwhile, MRT Corp extended the bidding deadline for project tenders to the end of 2023. On 2 September 2024, MRT Corp commenced a three-month public inspection exercise that concluded on 2 December 2024. A dedicated microsite was launched detailing the line alignment and station features, supported by information kiosks in MRT stations and mobile info trucks along the corridor. On 17 July 2025, Transport Minister Anthony Loke approved the Final Railway Scheme, clearing the way for land acquisition to begin, with completion targeted for the end of 2026. MRT Corp announced that 93.3 percent of feedback received during the public inspection supported the project, and the number of land lots required had been reduced from 1,012 to 690, representing a 31 percent decrease.

== Network ==
The Final Railway Scheme approved in July 2025 comprises a total of 33 stations (26 elevated and 7 underground). Designed to integrate with the other existing urban rail lines, the line will have 10 interchange and connecting stations. The alignment features 30 active stations and 3 provisional stations. It will also be served by 2 depots. All of the station names are interim and subject to change. A full ride around the line will take approximately 75 minutes.

Station code	Working Name	Position	Park & Ride	Interchange station/Notes
CC01	Bukit Kiara Selatan	Elevated	N/A	Interchange station with KG12A MRT Kajang Line.
CC02	Bukit Kiara	Elevated	N/A	Upgraded from provisional to active station status in the Final Railway Scheme.
CC03	Sri Hartamas	Underground	N/A	Also serves Mont Kiara
CC04	Bukit Segambut	Underground	N/A	
CC05	Taman Sri Sinar	Underground	✓	
CC06	Dutamas	Underground	N/A	Walking distance to MITEC and will serve the upcoming KL Metropolis district.
CC07	(Provisional)	Underground	N/A	(Provisional station) Proposed interchange station with KA04A KTM Tanjung Malim-Port Klang Line.
CC08	(Provisional)	Elevated	N/A	(Provisional station)
CC09	Titiwangsa	Elevated	N/A	Interchange station with AG3 SP3 MR11 PY17 LRT Ampang Line, LRT Sri Petaling Line, KL Monorail Line and MRT Putrajaya Line.
CC10	Kampung Puah	Elevated	✓	Upgraded from provisional to active station status in the Final Railway Scheme.
CC11	Jalan Langkawi	Elevated	✓	
CC12	Danau Kota	Elevated	N/A	
CC13	Setapak	Elevated	N/A	
CC14	Rejang	Underground	N/A	
CC15	Setiawangsa	Elevated	N/A	Interchange station with KJ5 LRT Kelana Jaya Line.
CC16	AU2	Elevated	N/A	Upgraded from provisional to active station status in the Final Railway Scheme.
CC17	Taman Hillview	Elevated	✓	(Provisional station)
CC18	Tasik Ampang	Elevated	N/A	
CC19	Kampung Pandan	Elevated	✓	
CC20	Pandan Indah	Elevated	✓	Interchange station with AG15 LRT Ampang Line.
CC21	Taman Kencana	Elevated	✓	
CC22	Taman Cheras	Elevated	✓	
CC23	Taman Midah	Elevated	N/A	Interchange station with KG24 MRT Kajang Line.
CC24	Jalan Yaacob Latif	Elevated	N/A	Connected to Pusat Perubatan Universiti Kebangsaan Malaysia (PPUKM).
CC25	Sri Permaisuri	Elevated	✓	
CC26	Salak Selatan	Elevated	✓	Interchange station with SP13 LRT Sri Petaling Line.
CC27	Salak Jaya	Elevated	N/A	
CC28	Kuchai	Elevated	N/A	Interchange station with PY27 MRT Putrajaya Line.
CC29	Jalan Klang Lama	Elevated	✓	
CC30	Pantai Dalam	Elevated	N/A	Connecting station with KD03 KTM Tanjung Malim-Port Klang Line.
CC31	Pantai Permai	Elevated	N/A	
CC32	Universiti	Elevated	N/A	Interchange station with KJ19 LRT Kelana Jaya Line.
CC33	UM	Underground	N/A	Connected to Pusat Perubatan Universiti Malaya (PPUM).
