= Mantissa College =

College in Kuala Lumpur, Malaysia

- Type: Private college
- Established: 1999
- Affiliations: IPE Management School Paris; University of Wolverhampton; University of Bolton
- Principal: William Chua Chong Keow
- Location: Taman Tun Dr Ismail, Kuala Lumpur, Malaysia
- Website: www.mantissa.edu.my

Mantissa College is a private educational establishment founded in 1999 with approval from the Malaysia Education ministry.

== History ==
The institute was founded in 1999 as an IT college and is wholly owned by PMI Education Sdn. Bhd (Reg No. 629638V).

== International presence ==
Internationally, Mantissa Diploma courses are articulated with 40 universities from United Kingdom, France, Australia, New Zealand, United States, Canada, Taiwan (Ming Chuan University) and China (Henan University).

== Courses offered ==
- Certificate in English Language (CIEL)
- Diploma in Information Technology (DIT)
- Bachelor of Business Administration
- International Executive Master in Business Administration Programme (IEMBA)
- Doctorate of Business Administration (DBA)
