= Jalan Sultan Haji Ahmad Shah, Kuala Lumpur =

Road in Malaysia

Jalan Sultan Haji Ahmad Shah (Jalan Khidmat Usaha)

Major junctions
- West end: Persiaran Dutamas junction
- Persiaran Dutamas; Jalan Tunku Abdul Halim (Jalan Duta)
- East end: Jalan Tunku Abdul Halim (Jalan Duta) interchange

Location
- Country: Malaysia
- Primary destinations: MATRADE; Menara Miti

Highway system
- Highways in Malaysia; Expressways; Federal; State

Jalan Sultan Haji Ahmad Shah, formerly Jalan Khidmat Usaha, is a major road in Kuala Lumpur, Malaysia. It was named after seventh Yang di-Pertuan Agong, Sultan Ahmad Shah of Pahang (1979–1984).

On 26 November 2014, the Kuala Lumpur City Hall (DBKL) changed the name of Jalan Khidmat Usaha to Jalan Sultan Haji Ahmad Shah.

A proposed direct link road from the NKVE and DUKE Highway interchange connecting the Persiaran Dutamas junction has been planned for and under the KL Metropolis development.

== List of junctions ==
Exit	Junctions	To	Remarks
	Persiaran Dutamas	Persiaran Dutamas West (proposal); Duta–Ulu Klang Expressway Duta Interchange (DUKE & NKVE); Jalan Tuanku Abdul Halim Petaling Jaya Shah Alam Ulu Kelang Ampang Jaya North; Dutamas; Segambut South; Sri Hartamas; Mont Kiara Publika Shopping Gallery	T-junctions
	Arte Mont Kiara	North Arte Mont Kiara	T-junctions
	MATRADE	North; MATRADE MITI Tower	T-junctions
	Jalan Boulevard	Jalan Boulevard North MET 1 Residences MITEC (South Entrance) KL Metropolis	T-junctions
	Kuala Lumpur Courts Complex	North; Kuala Lumpur Courts Complex South; Federal Territory Mosque	Junctions
	Jalan Sultan Mizan Zainal Abidin (Jalan Khidmat Setia and Jalan Ibadah)	Jalan Sultan Mizan Zainal Abidin North (Jalan Khidmat Setia); Inland Revenue Board (LHDN) Jalan Duta branch Arkib Negara (National Archives Malaysia) South (Jalan Ibadah); Federal Territory Mosque	Junctions
	Jalan Tuanku Abdul Halim (Jalan Duta)	Jalan Tuanku Abdul Halim (Jalan Duta) North; Sentul; Segambut; Kepong; Batu Caves; Kuantan South; City Centre; Damansara; Bangsar; Petaling Jaya; North–South Expressway Northern Route AH141 New Klang Valley Expressway; Ipoh; Klang; Kuala Lumpur International Airport (KLIA); Johor Bahru	Diamond interchange
