= Malaysia International Trade and Exhibition Centre =

Trade and exhibition centre in Kuala Lumpur, Malaysia

- Pusat Pameran dan Perdagangan Antarabangsa Malaysia
- MITEC in November 2026

General information
- Status: Completed
- Type: Trade and exhibition centre
- Location: KL Metropolis, Kuala Lumpur, Malaysia, Kompleks MITEC, No. 8, Jalan Dutamas 2, 50480 Kuala Lumpur, Malaysia
- Construction started: December 2012
- Completed: December 2016
- Inaugurated: 8 August 2017
- Cost: RM628 million
- Owner: MATRADE
- Operator: Qube Integrated Malaysia Sdn. Bhd. (METCO)

Technical details
- Floor count: 3
- Floor area: 52,000 m^{2} (560,000 sq ft) (venue space)

Design and construction
- Architect: RSP Architects
- Developer: Naza TTDI Sdn. Bhd.

Website
- mitec.com.my

The Malaysia International Trade and Exhibition Centre (MITEC; Malay: Pusat Pameran dan Perdagangan Antarabangsa Malaysia) is a trade and exhibition centre located in KL Metropolis, Segambut, Kuala Lumpur, Malaysia. Owned by the Malaysia External Trade Development Corporation (MATRADE), it serves as the flagship component of the KL Metropolis mixed-use development.

The centre comprises 11 exhibition halls distributed across three double-volume levels, providing approximately 52,000 m^{2} (560,000 sq ft) of exhibition and convention space. Its largest pillarless exhibition hall spans 12,960 m^{2} (139,500 sq ft) of column-free floor space on a single level. Additional facilities include a grand ballroom, a junior ballroom, 13 meeting rooms, a multi-purpose hall, and outdoor event spaces.

Developed by Naza TTDI, MITEC was constructed between December 2012 and December 2016 at a cost of RM628 million. The building was officially handed over to the Malaysian government on 8 August 2017 ahead of the 2017 SEA Games, during which it hosted nine sporting disciplines.

== History ==
MITEC was conceived as the first anchor phase of the 75.5-acre (30.6 ha) KL Metropolis master development by Naza TTDI, planned as an integrated trade, commercial, and residential district in the Dutamas area of Kuala Lumpur.

Schematic design and master planning began in June 2010. Following earthworks in mid-2012, main building construction commenced in December 2012 and was completed in December 2016. Undertaken through a public–private partnership between Naza TTDI and the federal government at a cost of RM628 million, the complex was formally handed over to the Ministry of International Trade and Industry (MITI) on 8 August 2017.

Its opening coincided with the 2017 SEA Games in August 2017, for which MITEC served as a primary indoor competition cluster, hosting fencing, artistic and rhythmic gymnastics, boxing, indoor hockey, Muay Thai, table tennis, volleyball, and weightlifting.

== Architecture and facilities ==
Designed by RSP Architects, MITEC's architectural form draws inspiration from the shape of a rubber seed, referencing the historical role of the rubber industry in Malaysia's economic development. The elliptical structure features a curved glass, aluminium, and steel roof and facade patterned with diamond-shaped geometric motifs derived from traditional Malay songket weaving.

The complex's 11 exhibition halls are stacked across three double-volume levels with varying structural floor-loading capacities:

- Level 1 houses heavy-duty pillared halls with a 10-metre rigging height and a maximum floor loading capacity of 5 t/m^{2} (1,000 lb/sq ft), engineered to support heavy industrial machinery and automotive exhibitions.
- Level 2 comprises pillared exhibition halls with a 7.7-metre rigging height and a floor loading capacity of up to 2 t/m^{2} (410 lb/sq ft), alongside convention and banquet spaces.
- Level 3 contains three column-free halls with a 14-metre rigging height and a floor loading capacity of 1 t/m^{2} (200 lb/sq ft), capable of combining into a single 12,960 m^{2} (139,500 sq ft) pillarless arena accommodating up to 18,000 people in theatre seating or 6,700 in banquet configuration.

Supporting convention facilities include a grand ballroom, a junior ballroom, a multi-purpose hall (Novel), 13 partitionable meeting and breakout rooms, VIP suites, diplomatic lounges, two outdoor amphitheatres, an oval garden, and basement parking. The venue is equipped with step-free access, lifts, escalators, nursing rooms, prayer halls, and public Wi-Fi.

== Major events ==
=== Trade, defence, and sporting events ===
MITEC regularly hosts major international trade fairs, including the Malaysian International Furniture Fair (MIFF) and the MATTA Fair, as well as the biennial Defence Services Asia (DSA) and National Security Asia (NATSEC Asia) defence expositions (held at the venue since 2018, including the 2022, 2024, and April 2026 editions).

In addition to hosting nine events during the 2017 SEA Games, the centre has served as an arena for international esports tournaments, including the Mobile Legends: Bang Bang Southeast Asia Cup in June 2022 and the Dota 2 tournament ESL One Kuala Lumpur in December 2023.

=== COVID-19 vaccination centre ===
During the COVID-19 pandemic, MITEC was designated as a mega vaccination centre under the National COVID-19 Immunisation Programme. Operating from 31 May to 22 August 2021 across two multi-purpose halls, the facility administered nearly 590,000 vaccine doses, reaching a peak daily throughput exceeding 12,000 doses.

== Transportation ==
MITEC is situated along Jalan Dutamas 2 and is accessible via the Duta–Ulu Klang Expressway (DUKE), New Klang Valley Expressway (NKVE), Sprint Expressway (SPRINT), and Jalan Kuching.

=== Public transport ===
The MATRADE and MITEC precinct is served by Rapid KL stage bus route 851 from Pasar Seni hub, MRT feeder bus route T852 (connecting directly to Semantan MRT station on the Kajang Line), and the Go KL City Bus Magenta Line (GoKL-13), which stop along Jalan Sultan Haji Ahmad Shah and the MATRADE South bus stop (KL1022), a four-minute walk from MITEC. Commuters on the KTM Komuter network can also alight at Segambut Komuter station and complete the transfer via taxi or e-hailing services.

=== Future rail connection ===
Location of the proposed Dutamas station on the MRT3 Circle Line near MITEC, photographed in November 2026

MITEC is planned to be served directly by the upcoming MRT3 Circle Line, which includes a proposed station provisionally named Dutamas serving KL Metropolis and the surrounding administrative enclave. Following a public inspection exercise in 2024, the Final Railway Scheme for the MRT3 Circle Line received approval from the Ministry of Transport on 17 July 2025. As of 2026, land acquisition and preparatory works are underway ahead of physical construction in 2027, with full line operations targeted for 2032.

== See also ==
- KL Metropolis
- MATRADE Exhibition and Convention Centre
- World Trade Centre Kuala Lumpur
- Kuala Lumpur Convention Centre
