= KL Metropolis =

Mixed development in Kuala Lumpur, Malaysia

- Neighborhood of Kuala Lumpur
- International Trade and Exhibition District
- KL Metropolis in 2026

- Logo
- Motto(s): A Capital Masterpiece, A City Inspired By Vision
- Interactive map of KL Metropolis
- Coordinates: 3.17811°N 101.66864°E
- Country: Malaysia
- City: Kuala Lumpur
- Constituency: Segambut
- Mukim: Batu
- Status: Under construction
- Founder: Naza TTDI (under Naza)

Area
  - Land: 30.6 ha (75.5 acres)
- Time zone: UTC+8 (Malaysia Standard Time)
- Postal code: 50480
- Website: www.klmetropolis.com

KL Metropolis is a 75.5-acre mixed development situated nearby the Kuala Lumpur Courts Complex in the district of Segambut, Kuala Lumpur, Malaysia. The term "KL" from its name is short for Kuala Lumpur. This RM21 billion development is envisioned to become the leading centre for international trade and exhibition of Kuala Lumpur, similar to the Tun Razak Exchange which on the other hand will become the city's new financial district. It will consist a total gross floor of 22,800,000 sq ft (2,120,000 m^{2}). KL Metropolis will integrate trade, commerce, living, and transport in one bustling hub located within the big city which will be built in stages over a duration of 20 years.

A proposed direct link road from the NKVE and DUKE Highway connecting Jalan Sultan Haji Ahmad Shah junction has also been planned to ease traffic for the development in the future. An MRT3 station will also be built along Jalan Dutamas 2.

KL Metropolis' landmark building will be the 100-storey NAZA Signature Tower within MET 3, and is set to dominate the skyline in the western side of Kuala Lumpur. The tower is a proposed supertall skyscraper that will 412.8 m (1,354 ft) high above ground.

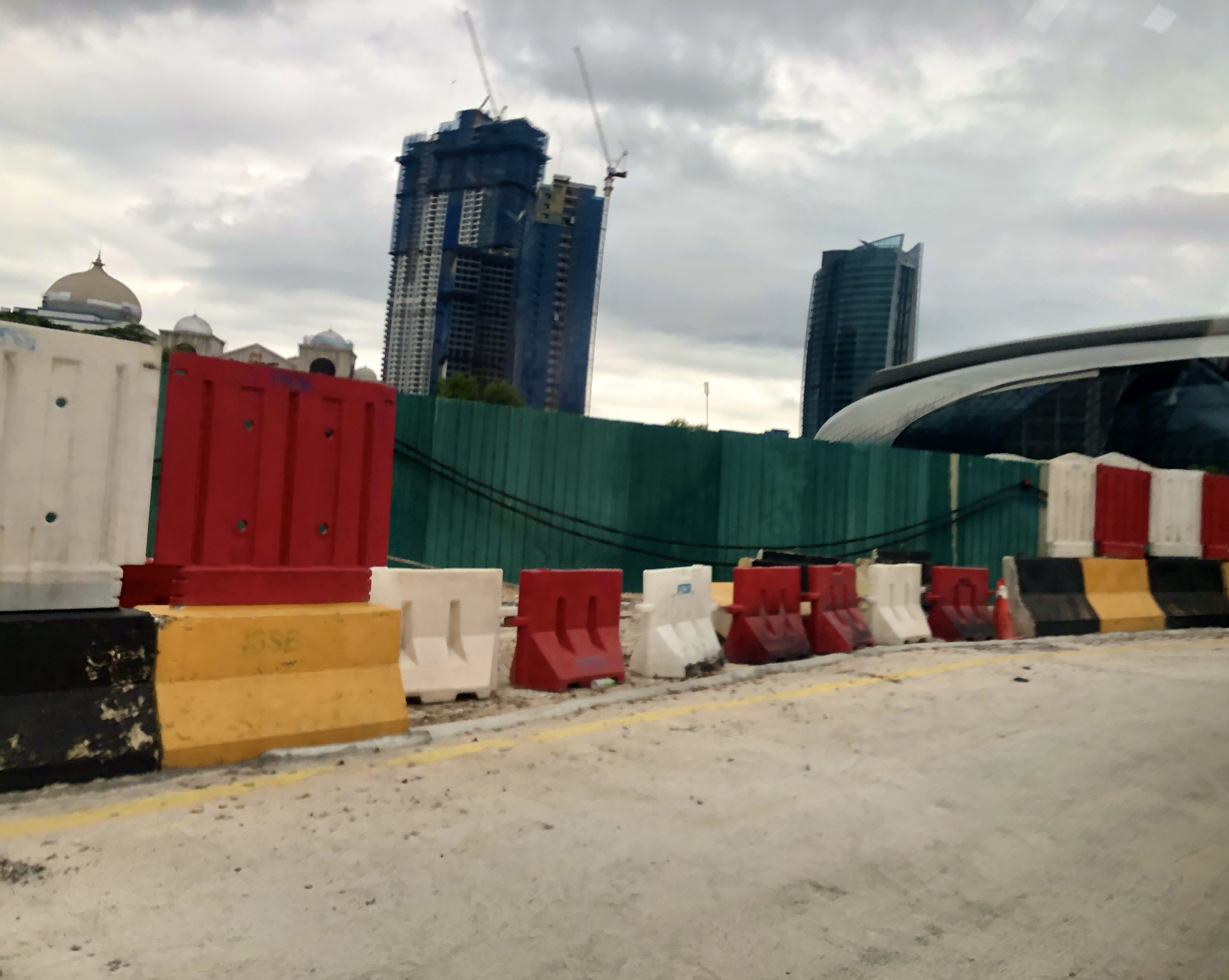
The MET 1 Residences and Menara MITI can be seen in the background

== Developer ==
The KL Metropolis development is being undertaken by Naza TTDI Sdn Bhd, a real estate company of Naza Group.

== Development plots ==
The development is subdivided into nine parcels - MET 1, MET 2, MET 3, MET 5, MET 6, MET 7, MET 8, MET 9 as well as MITEC which was accordingly supposed to be the MET 4. Two of the precincts will be jointly developed with partners; MET 5 with Hap Seng Land Sdn Bhd while MET 8 with Triterra Metropolis Sdn Bhd.

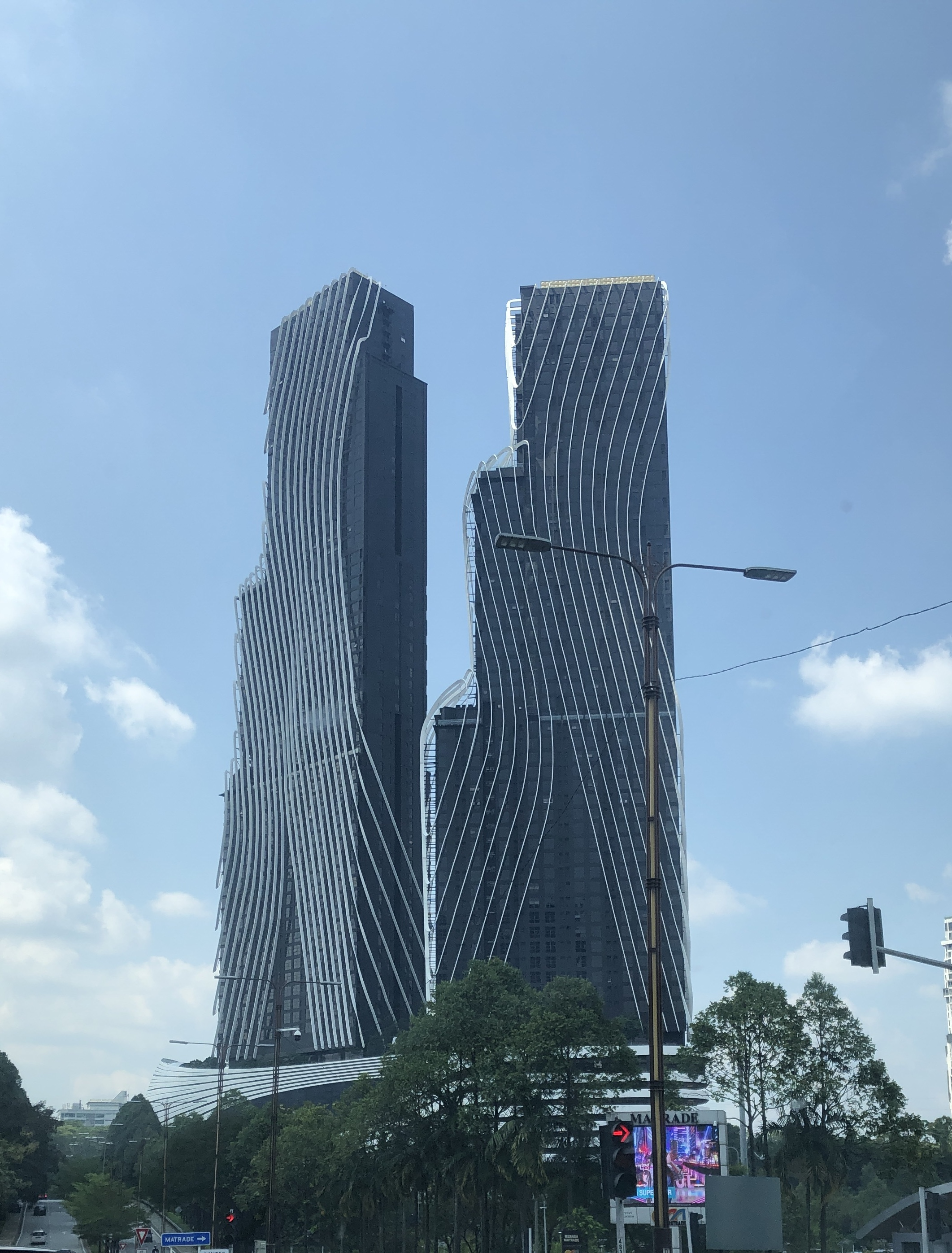
Arte Mont Kiara along Jalan Sultan Haji Ahmad Shah.

=== Arte Mont Kiara ===
Three towers comprising simplex, duplex suites and serviced residences on a 3.29 acres (1.33 ha) land. Arte Mont Kiara was developed by Arte Corp, formerly known as Nusmetro Property Sdn Bhd (Nusmetro), under a joint-venture with Naza TTDI. The project was launched in 2015 and completed in 2020.

=== MATRADE ===
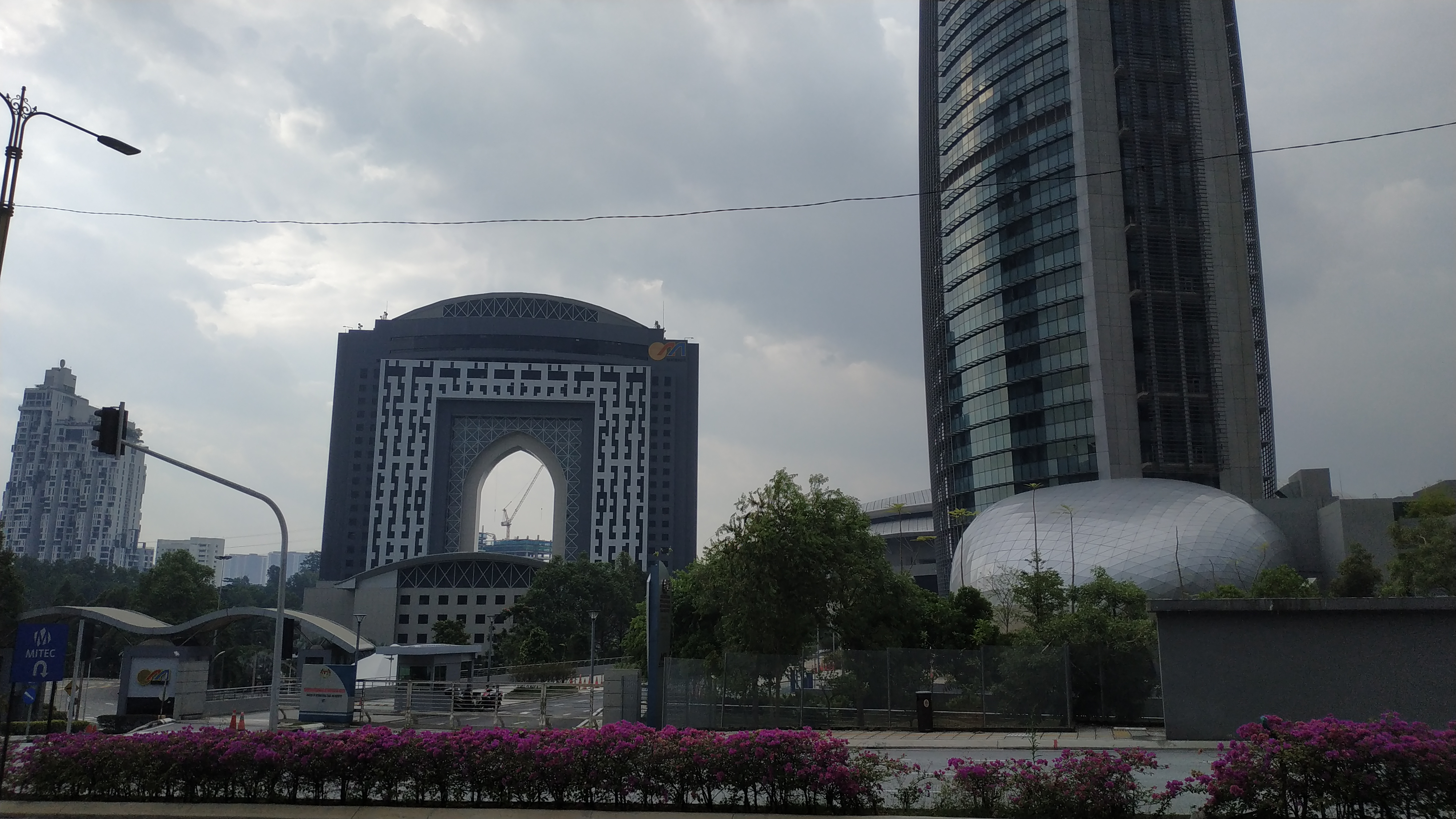
Menara MATRADE (MATRADE Tower) and Menara MITI (MITI Tower)

Housed the Malaysia External Trade Development Corporation headquarters and MATRADE Exhibition and Convention Centre (MECC).

=== MITI ===
33-storey office tower with the Ministry of International Trade and Industry's main headquarters, commonly known as MITI Tower or Menara MITI, will be situated within the development.

=== Malaysia International Trade and Exhibition Centre ===
13-acre land developed on top of MET 4 with a total area of 1.5 million square feet. The Malaysia International Trade and Exhibition Centre (MITEC) is the first flagship and component of the development which officially opened in August 2017.

=== Metropolis Park ===
Also known as the KL Metropolis Park, it will have 8 acres (3.2 ha) of urban park and recreational facilities which will be constructed in between MET 3 and MITEC lands as part of the government's Greener KL initiative. It will be integrated to the other precincts via pedestrian walkaways in the district while Naza TTDI Sdn Bhd will be managing the RM20 million park over 15 years. Among the facilities included will be a dry and wet playground, jogging park, kinetic fitness stations, therapeutic garden, terrace garden, sculpture park, picnic mound, nightscapes, event lawn, amphitheatre and dry fountain. The park is currently undergoing construction phase.

=== MET 1 – Somerset, MET Galleria, MET 1 Residences ===
TTDI KL Metropolis Sdn Bhd, a wholly owned subsidiary of Naza TTDI, is currently constructing MET 1 on 4.25 acres of land right beside the Kuala Lumpur High Court. MET 1's development will include an office tower, 55-storey MET1 Residences, Somerset KL Metropolis by The Ascott Limited (Ascott) and MET Galleria. It is also one of the first retail component of the KL Metropolis development with 80,000 sq ft (7,400 m^{2}) space on 3 levels of retail. The project was officially kicked off in 2017 and is expected to be completed in 2023.

=== MET 2 – TBA ===
Consist of strata offices with a 4-star hotel.

=== MET 3 – Naza Signature Tower ===
15.3-acre land for the proposed 2,000,000 sq ft (190,000 m^{2}) lifestyle mall located at the foot of the NAZA Signature Tower. MET 3 will also be built together with a luxury condominium, 5-star hotel together with Grade A office towers. In January 2022, Hap Seng Consolidated Berhad had plans to acquire the land of MET 3 under a purchase agreement to strengthen its property development business particularly in KL Metropolis.

=== MET 5 – KL Midtown ===
KL Midtown

An 8.95 acres (3.62 ha) of land which was launched in 2018 and consist of a mixed-use development right next to Kuarters Kerajaan Jalan Duta. Met 5 will include a retail mall , 2 office towers, 3 residential towers, a corporate tower and a 5-star hotel under Hyatt Regency. The 500,000 square feet shopping mall will be managed by AEON Co. (M) Bhd and will include a supermarket under its brand. (Partnership with Hap Seng Land Sdn Bhd)

=== MET 6 – The Fiddlewoodz ===
The Fiddlewoodz is currently being built on 1.86 acres (0.75 ha) of land and will feature 2 blocks of serviced apartments. It has been slated for completion by 2025 with a gross development value of RM828 million. (Partnership with EXSIM Development Sdn Bhd)

=== MET 7 – TBA ===
Proposed serviced residential towers with constructions expected to commence after the completion of MET 1.

=== MET 8 – The MET Corporate Towers ===
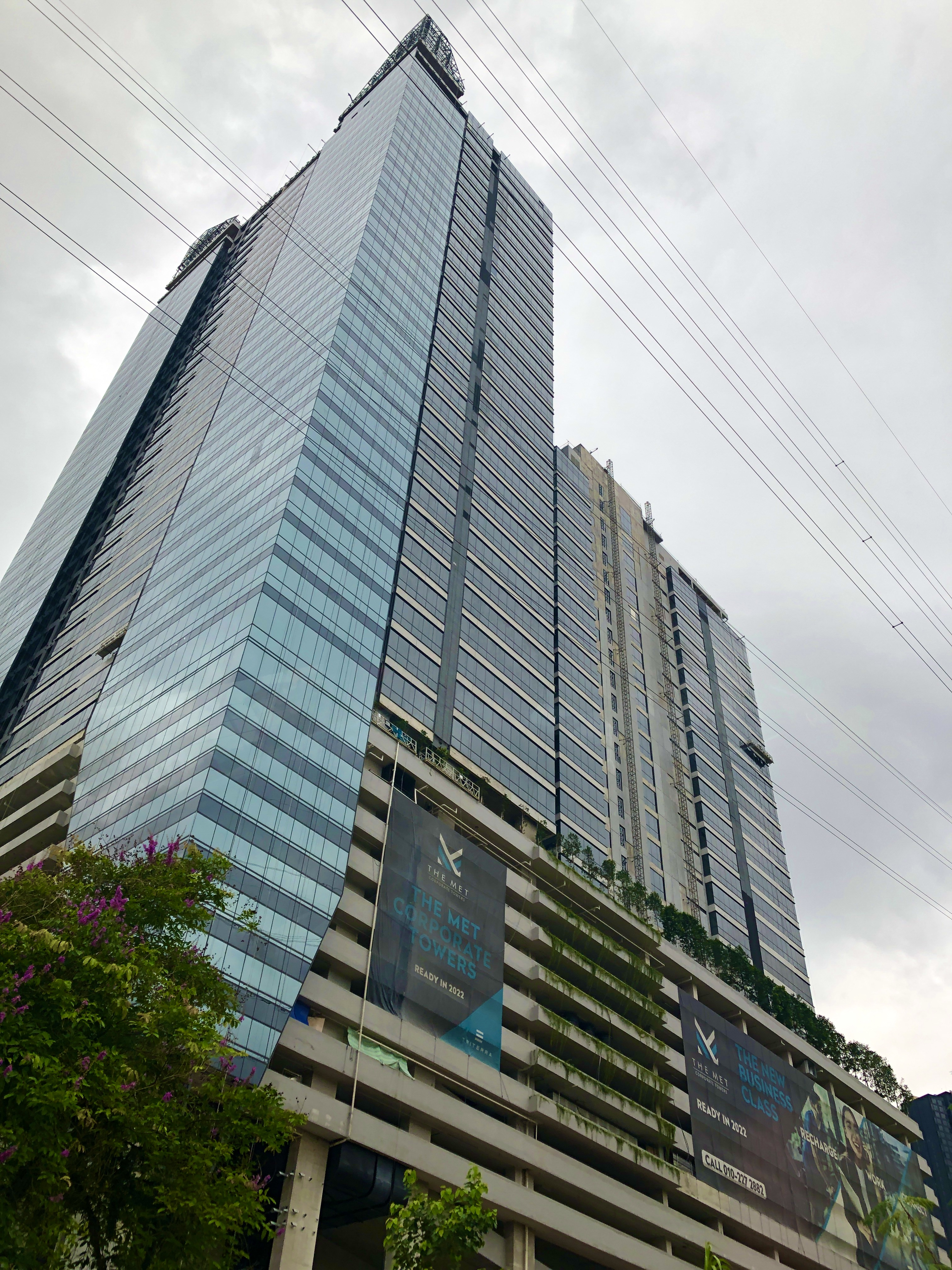
The MET Corporate Towers nearing completion in June 2022

The MET is built through a partnership with Triterra Metropolis Sdn Bhd on 2.47 acres (1.00 ha) to the west of KL Metropolis. The construction of the 2 blocks commenced in 2018 and was completed in 2023. It features two Grade A strata office towers of Tower A and B, with 42-storey and 30-storey respectively. The Construction Industry Development Board Malaysia (CIDB) main headquarters is located here at tower B, while tower A is currently leased out to German-based Siemens Healthineers AG.

=== MET 9 – TBA ===
A proposed 5-star luxury hotel next to MITEC.

== Public transportation ==
In the future, the district will be served by the proposed CC06 Dutamas MRT station on the MRT Circle Line. The station is still in planning stage as the developer is working with the Malaysian government to identify a site for the station.

The nearest station to the area as for now is the KA05 Segambut Komuter station of the 2 Port Klang Line.

== See also ==
- List of tallest buildings in Malaysia
- Malaysian national projects
- Naza Group of Companies
- Tun Razak Exchange (TRX)
