= Taman Duta =

- Suburb
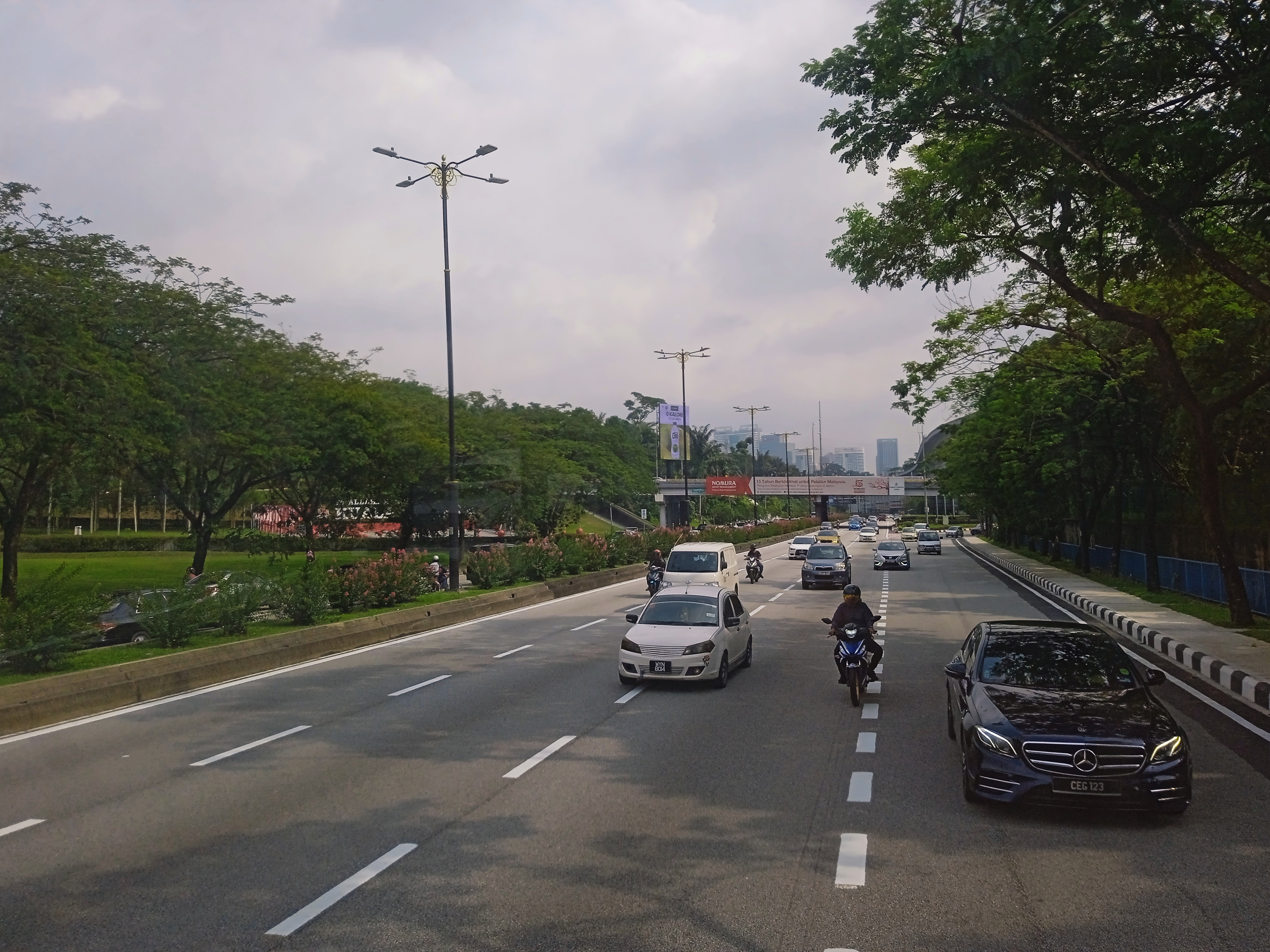
- Taman Duta
- Country: Malaysia
- State: Federal Territory of Kuala Lumpur
- Constituency: Segambut

Government
  - Local Authority: Dewan Bandaraya Kuala Lumpur
  - Mayor: Kamarulzaman Mat Salleh
- Time zone: UTC+8 (MST)

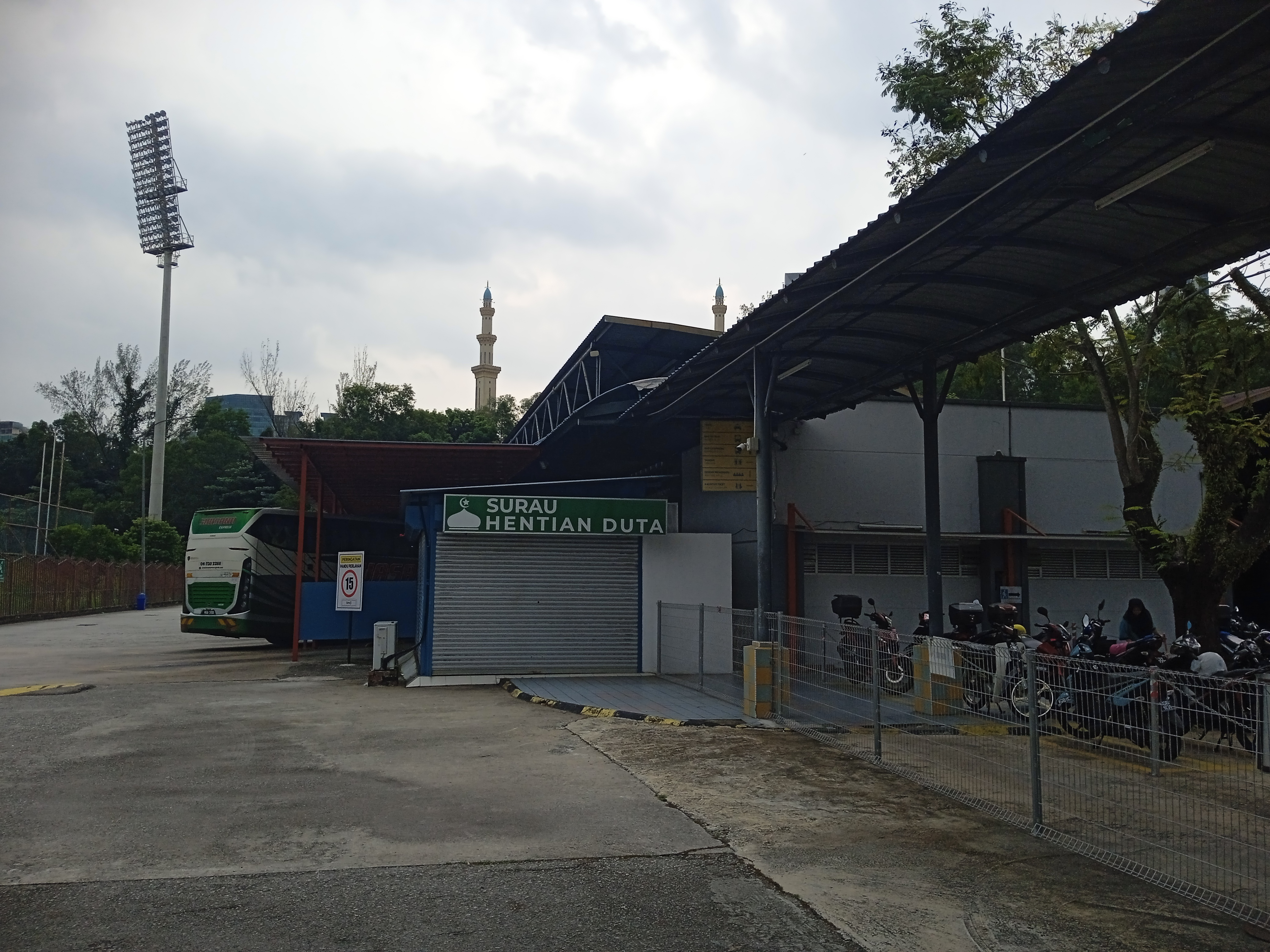
Hentian Duta, interstate bus stop in Taman Duta

Taman Duta refers to the area that Jalan Tuanku Abdul Halim (previously also named Jalan Duta) in Kuala Lumpur, Malaysia passes through. The area spans from the adjoining roundabout of Jalan Kuching, where a high flyover takes traffic straight into Jalan Ipoh, and ends at the Parliament where it adjoins Lebuhraya Sultan Iskandar (formerly known as Jalan Mahameru). Buildings located within this area include the Federal Territory Mosque, Federal Governmental Complex, Arkib Negara (National Archives), Kuala Lumpur Courts Complex, New Istana Negara, MATRADE Exhibition and Convention Centre complex and Tun Razak Hockey Stadium.

== Duta enclave ==
The federal government possesses a 106.72 hectare parcel of land in Taman Duta known as the Duta enclave, which is subject to an ongoing legal dispute regarding its ownership as of September 2024. Parts of Jalan Tuanku Abdul Halim and the federal government buildings located in Taman Duta are built on this enclave. The government acquired this land in 1956 under the Land Acquisition Enactment for RM1.32 million, with plans to develop it into a diplomatic enclave. The original owner of the land, Semantan Estate, challenged the government's taking of the land as unlawful and sued. Real estate analysts estimate that the Duta enclave is worth RM5 to RM6 billion.

Semantan Estate was founded by Eng Lian Group and Ng Chin Siu & Sons Rubber Estates Sdn Bhd. Eng Lian Group developed much of Bangsar, while Ng Chin Siu & Sons at one point had substantial holdings in Mont Kiara and Desa Sri Hartamas. In 2009, the High Court ruled in favour of Semantan Estate and declared the federal government had trespassed on its land; this was subsequently upheld by the Court of Appeal and the Federal Court in 2012. The federal government applied for a further review of the decision, which the Federal Court dismissed in November 2018.

Semantan Estate's liquidators then filed a claim for mesne profits in 2022, demanding compensation representing rent that the federal government owed for the Duta enclave since taking possession of the land. During proceedings in the High Court, lawyers for the Semantan Estate argued that it was owed RM3.1 to RM6.646 billion with simple interest, or up to RM13.242 billion with compound interest. Government lawyers argued that the compensation owed was not more than RM290 million. In August 2024 the High Court ruled that the government must return possession of the Duta enclave to Semantan Estate, raising questions about the future of the government buildings that had been built on the land. The government immediately announced it intended to appeal the ruling, and applied for a stay of the High Court's order that is pending a hearing as of September 2024.

=== Legal history ===
Semantan Estate first sued in 1960, arguing that the RM1.3 million it had received in compensation was inadequate, and seeking instead RM3.25 million. The lawyer who initially represented Semantan Estate was Yong Pung How, later Chief Justice of Singapore, of the firm Shook Lin & Bok. The High Court held that the Collector of Land Revenue had not properly complied with the Land Acquisition Enactment, because among other issues, it had failed to hold an enquiry into the acquisition and compensation amount. The court ordered the Collector to rectify these oversights before the hearing could continue. The government reportedly ignored this order. Semantan Estate applied for a writ of mandamus from the courts to compel the government's compliance, but despite appealing to the apex Supreme Court, its efforts did not succeed.

In the early 1980s, Semantan Estate resumed legal proceedings and applied again for a writ of mandamus. This time it engaged the law firm Chooi & Co, whose managing partner, Chooi Mun Sou, had been a legal assistant to Yong Pung How when the case first began in 1960. At this point, the government successfully argued that the three year period during which Semantan Estate was entitled to sue had lapsed. In 1989, Chooi & Co filed a new suit against the government for trespassing, on the grounds that the government had not lawfully taken possession of the land. The High Court initially dismissed the suit, but on appeal, the Supreme Court allowed the case to proceed. In 2010, the High Court ruled that the government had not taken possession of the land lawfully, and was thus trespassing on the Duta enclave. The ruling ordered the government to pay mesne profits to Semantan Estate. The government appealed this ruling, but lost in the Court of Appeal in May 2012 and then the apex Federal Court in November 2012.

As of 2013, Semantan Estate was undergoing voluntary liquidation and in the process of returning its assets to its owners, Eng Lian Group and Ng Chin Siu & Sons Rubber Estates Sdn Bhd. Both companies are vehicles for prominent land-owning families in Malaysia, both surnamed Ng but otherwise unrelated to one another. The disposal of the Duta enclave prevents the completion of the liquidation process, since until the status of the land and compensation are confirmed, any assets relating to the enclave cannot be returned to the owners of the estate. As of 2013, Ernst & Young was managing the liquidation of the estate, and attempting with Chooi & Co to negotiate a settlement with the government. At this time, a real estate appraiser hired by Semantan Estate estimated the value of the Duta enclave to be about RM1.6 billion.

In August 2024, the High Court ordered the government to return possession of the Duta enclave to Semantan Estate within three months, and to pay legal costs of RM50,000. During proceedings, a lawyer for Semantan Estate told the court that repeated attempts to negotiate a settlement with the government had occurred between 2013 and 2016, but they did not succeed. The government had applied for a review of the High Court's previous decision, but the Federal Court rejected this application in November 2018. The August 2024 High Court decision left open the question of mesne profits, subject to further proceedings.

Prior to the High Court ruling in August, the federal government asked for a three month adjournment to allow time for the parties to reach a settlement. However the High Court judge noted that the case had previously been adjourned in May for the same reason, and that the parties had attempted to negotiate a settlement between 2013 and 2016 without success. After rejecting the application for further adjournment, the court proceeded with a hearing of oral submissions that led it to grant an order for the land to be returned to Semantan Estate. At the hearing, Semantan Estate told the court its estimate of mesne profits owed for the land since its unlawful taking were RM3.1 to RM6.646 billion with simple interest, or RM13.242 billion with compound interest. A government representative from the Valuation and Property Services Department under the Ministry of Finance told the court that the amount owed should be only RM290 million.

== Politics ==
Taman Duta falls mostly within the Segambut constituency of the Malaysian Parliament.

== Public transportation ==
- KTM Segambut
- RapidKL bus T821 from MRT Semantan
