= Mont Kiara =

- Suburb of Kuala Lumpur
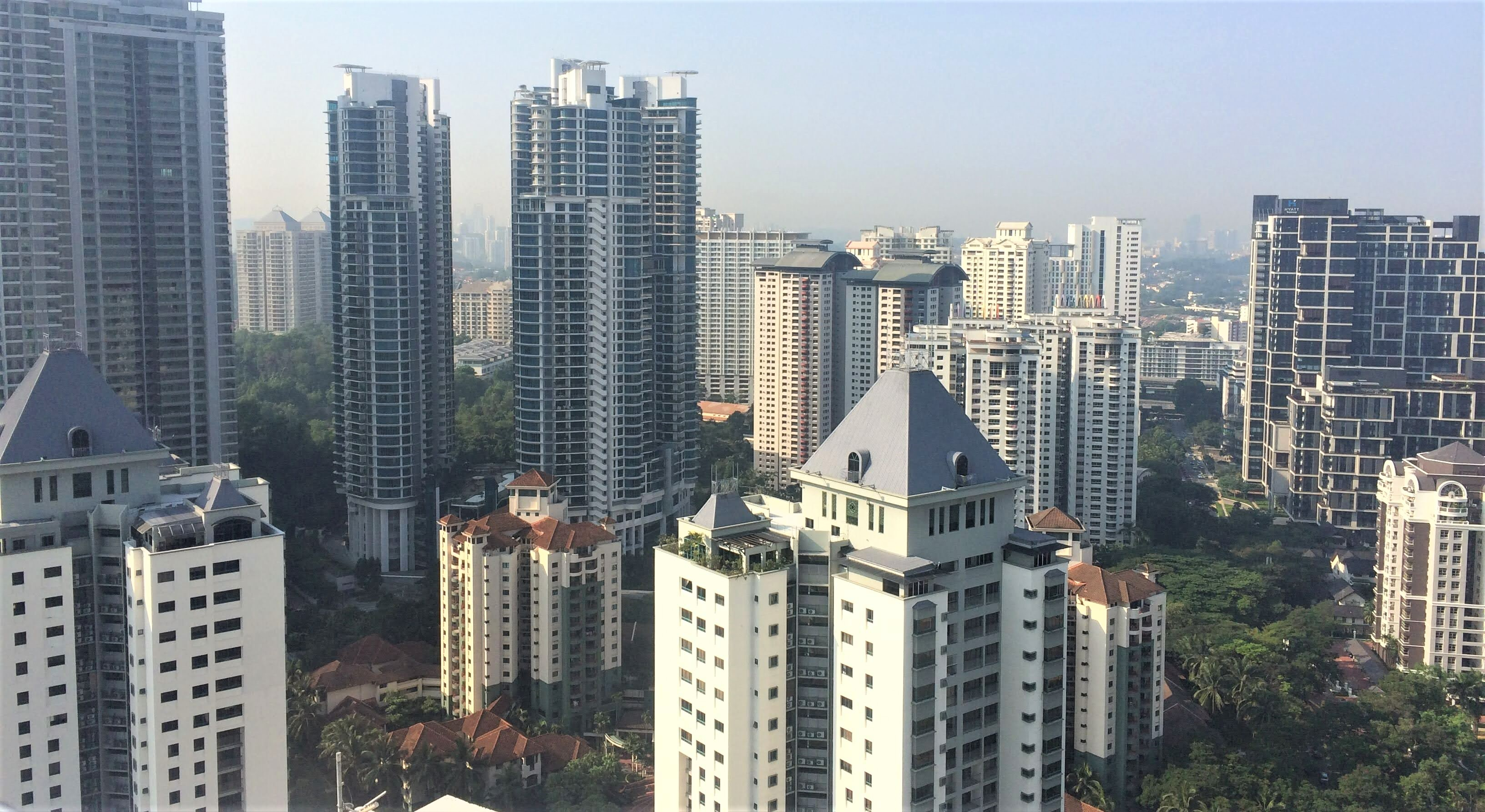
- Apartments at the center of Mont' Kiara in 2019
- Location of Mont Kiara in Kuala Lumpur
- Location within Malaysia Mont Kiara (Peninsular Malaysia) Mont Kiara (Malaysia)
- Coordinates: 3°10′15″N 101°39′14″E
- Country: Malaysia
- State: Federal Territory of Kuala Lumpur
- Constituency: Segambut

Government
  - Local Authority: Dewan Bandaraya Kuala Lumpur
  - Mayor: Maimunah Mohd Sharif
- Time zone: UTC+8 (MST)
- Postcode: 50480, rarely 51200
- Dialling code: +603-20, +603-62
- Police: Brickfields, Sentul, Dang Wangi
- Fire: Sri Hartamas, Jinjang

Mont Kiara, often stylized as MK, is an affluent suburb at the northwest of downtown Kuala Lumpur, Malaysia, in the constituency of Segambut. It consists mainly of high-rise residential condominiums and office complexes which were mostly developed by UEM Sunrise Berhad, a well-known property development arm of UEM Group. It is located in the heart of Klang Valley, halfway between Kepong and downtown Kuala Lumpur. It is adjacent to Sri Hartamas in the south and KL Metropolis in the east, and is heavily populated by expats.

While the name "North Kiara" refers to the area near Bukit Segambut as it is located north of Mont Kiara, the name has been used by developers up till now to link their property developments to the suburb.

== History ==
Mont Kiara was originally a rubber estate. The development of Mont Kiara started in the 90s by the Sunrise Berhad property developer and founder, Datuk Alan Tong Kok Mau; whom he bought 12 parcels of land in the area.

The 40.47 hectares of land was developed by Sunrise Berhad and renamed to Mont Kiara. Following Sunrise’s successful Mont Kiara Pines and Mont Kiara Palma projects in 1993 and 1994, other developers witnessed the rise of Mont Kiara, leading to further expansion of the area.

Mont Kiara is the only place in Peninsular Malaysia which uses word from French language as part of its name ("mont" means "mountain" in French, an allusion to the neighbouring Bukit Kiara).

== Plaza Mont Kiara ==
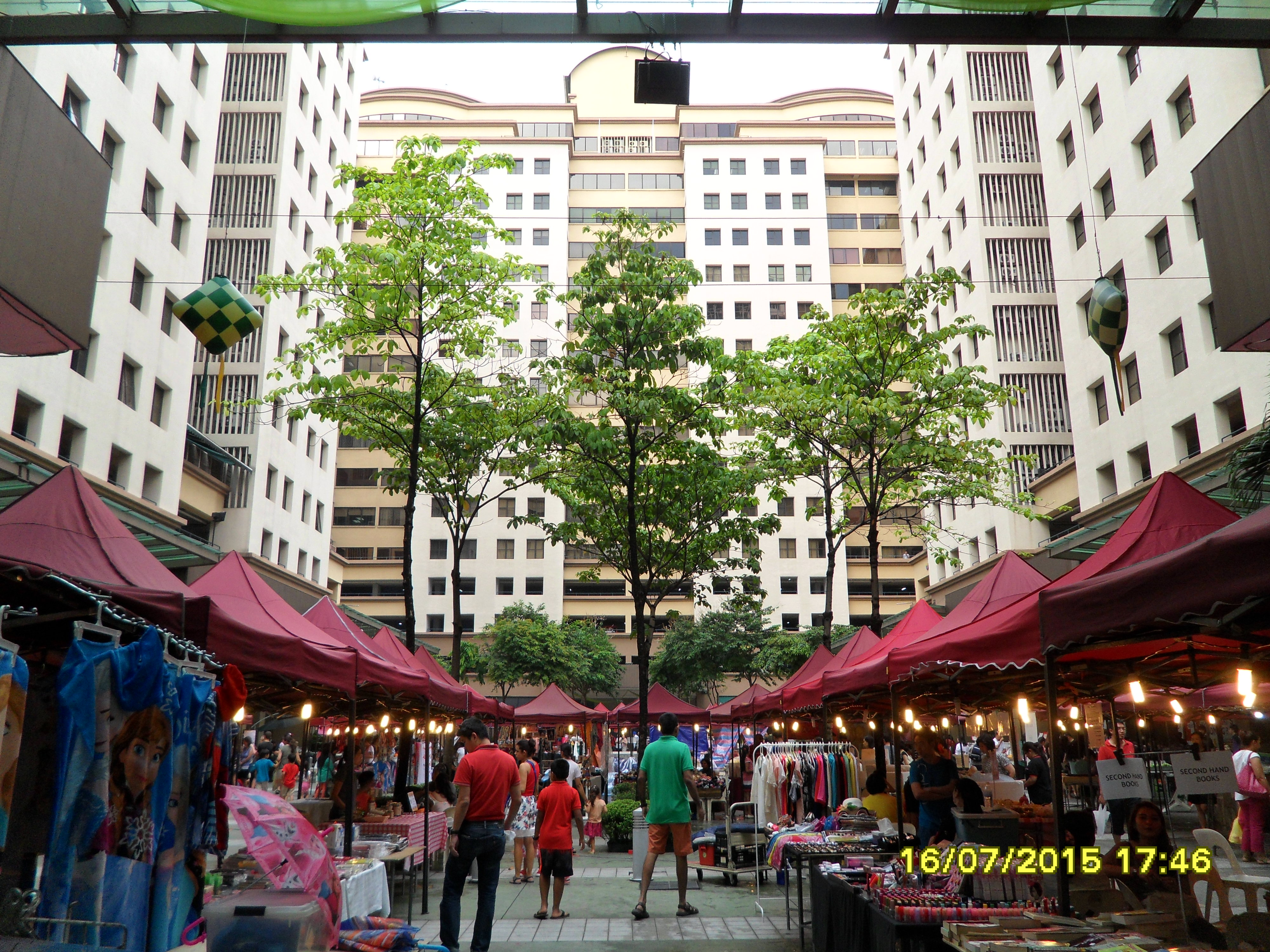
Plaza Mont Kiara's bazaar

Plaza Mont Kiara is a resort office-retail complex in Mont Kiara that attracts a high number of expatriates, representing more than 30 nationalities; particularly the Japanese, Britons and Singaporeans, who comprise almost half the total residential population in Mont Kiara. Plaza Mont Kiara is made up of restaurants, cafes, gyms as well as several banks serving the neighborhood.

Plaza Mont Kiara organises the Mont Kiara Funday "Arts, Bric-a-Brac & Crafts" (ABC) Market launched in March 2000, showcasing 100 exhibitor stalls spread over a 38,000 sq ft (3,500 m^{2}) fountain courtyard in its plaza. The ABC Market epitomises the "Made-in-Asia" dream featuring an amalgam of culture, arts and crafts where there are antiques, books, vintage apparel, clothing, household decorative items, educational toys, children wears, crafts, jewellery, bags and shoes, potted plants, fruits, and Asian food. The daytime market is held on Sundays. The ABC Market attracts at least 3,000 people throughout the day. Operated by Sunrise Berhad, it serves mainly to promote Malaysian arts and crafts to the public. Over the years the market has become part of the lifestyle of residents in Plaza Mont Kiara. A night market called Fiesta Nite at Plaza Mont Kiara is held at the fountain courtyard every Thursday.

== Shopping and retail ==
Mont Kiara's commercial projects include Publika Shopping Gallery, 1 Mont Kiara, Plaza Mont Kiara, Sunway 163 MALL, Solaris Mont Kiara, Solaris Dutamas and Arcoris Mont Kiara.

Sunway 163 at night

== Education ==
The area is served by two international schools, the British Garden International School and the American Mont'Kiara International School. The French School of Kuala Lumpur, Lycée Français Kuala Lumpur (LFKL), is within 3 km at the dead end of Jalan Dutamas Raya opposite Anggun Puri.

== Accessibility ==
=== Car ===
Mont Kiara is located right next to the intersection of four expressways – New Klang Valley Expressway E1, North–South Expressway Northern Route E1, Duta–Ulu Klang Expressway (DUKE) E33 and Sprint Expressway E23. The Jalan Duta toll plaza, the beginning of the northern sector of PLUS Expressway, is located just outside the northern end of Mont Kiara. The DUKE expressway connects Mont' Kiara to either Ampang, Ulu Klang or Gombak, which interchanges with the Kuala Lumpur Middle Ring Road 2 28 and East Coast Expressway E8. The Kerinchi Link, part of the Sprint network, enables motorists travelling from Mont Kiara or Kepong to reach the industrial city of Petaling Jaya while bypassing downtown Kuala Lumpur completely.

=== Public transport ===
The nearest rail station to Mont Kiara is the Segambut Komuter station, about 10–15 minutes' drive away. RapidKL bus route 190 (formerly U7) links Mont Kiara to Segambut KTM Komuter station.

Alternately, RapidKL bus route T818 connects Desa Sri Hartamas (across the Sprint Expressway from Mont Kiara proper) to the Semantan MRT station.

Since 1 December 2017 Mont Kiara is directly served by RapidKL bus route T852, also to Semantan MRT station.

The area is planned to be served by the Mont Kiara MRT station in the future which will be an underground station as part of the proposed MRT Circle Line.

== Politics ==
Mont Kiara is part of the Segambut constituency of the Dewan Rakyat in the Malaysian Parliament. The current representative is Hannah Yeoh of the Democratic Action Party since May 2018.

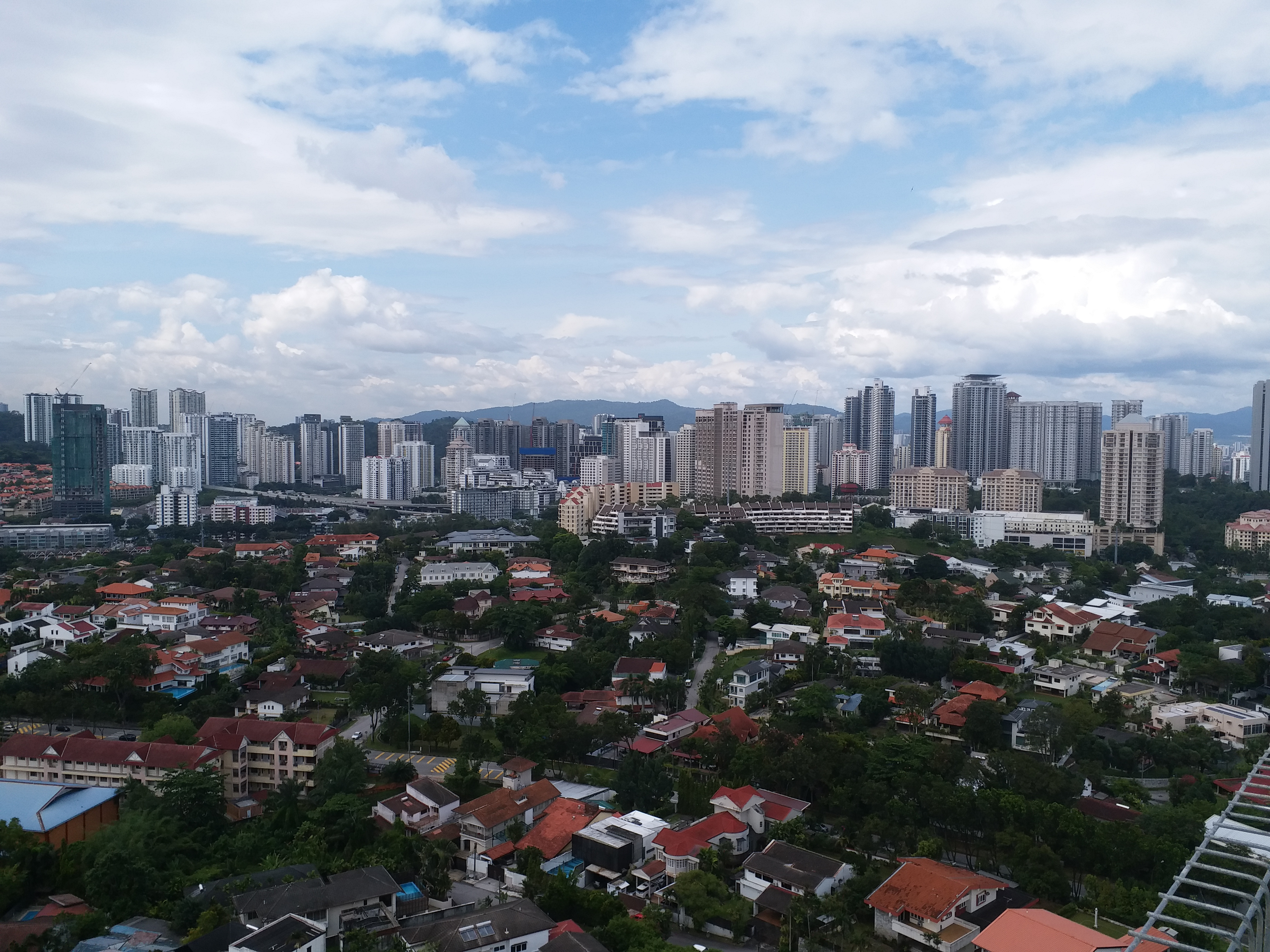
Rows of hi-rise buildings that make up Mont Kiara, as seen from Bukit Damansara in 2019.
