= 2015 Shutdown Sungai Besi rally =

Competition on 31 December 2015

Shutdown Sungai Besi rally
- Date: 31 December 2015
- Location: Sungai Besi, Kuala Lumpur
- Caused by: Protest against the rising cost of living
- Methods: Demonstration, speeches

Parties
National Trust Party, Democratic Action Party, Parti Keadilan Rakyat	Police

Number
30-100	200-500

The Shutdown Sungai Besi rally (known before as Shutdown Jalan Duta) was a rally that took place on 31 December 2015 in Kuala Lumpur, Malaysia. The rally was organised by National Trust Party, a political party in Malaysia. The rally aimed to protest the rising cost of living.

== Background ==
The rally were initially planned to be held at Dataran Merdeka before changed to Jalan Duta Toll Plaza. It were again changed to Sungai Besi Toll Plaza after receiving 'hard response' from the police. Serdang district police chief Assistant Commissioner, Razimi Ahmad declared the rally as illegal as it failed to obtain rally permit. However, Amanah Youth Vice-President, Mohd Fakhrulrazi Mohd Mokhtar insisted the rally will go on. Another Amanah Youth Vice-President, predicted the rally would attract 50,000 people. 17,000 have pledged to attend the rally.

== Rally ==
The rally was supposed to start at 9 pm, but started two hours later. The rally managed to attract 30 to 100 participants and lasted for 20–49 minutes. The crowd gathered first at a Shell station before proceed to the Toll Plaza. It was led by Amanah Deputy President, Salahuddin Ayub, which arrived only at 11 pm. Among other politician that present were Syefura Othman, DAP Woman's wing assistant secretary and Sepang MP, Hanipa Maidin. Rallygoers try to block the flow of the traffic but failed, due to the Police presence. Them then hold a small gathering just past the Kuala Lumpur-bound section of the toll gate. Salahuddin and several party members giving short speeches that were laced with criticism against the government, which they alleged as responsible behind the increase in cost of living. After midnight, the crowd dispersed peacefully.
