= MATRADE Exhibition and Convention Centre =

Coordinates: 3.177174°N 101.666751°E

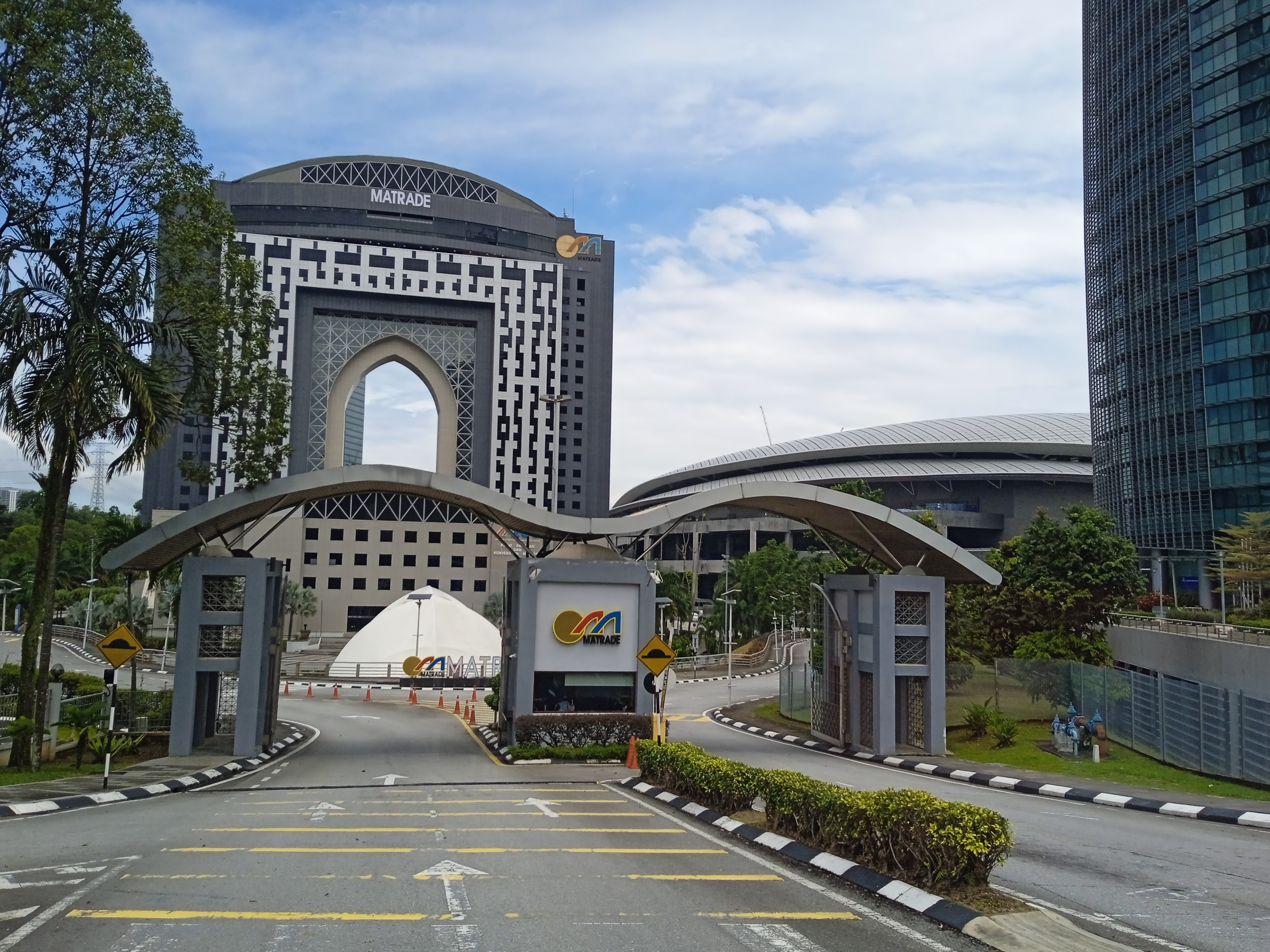
- Interactive map of the MATRADE Exhibition and Convention Centre area

General information
- Type: Trade and convention centre
- Location: Level 3, East Wing, Menara MATRADE Jalan Sultan Haji Ahmad Shah, Kuala Lumpur, Malaysia
- Inaugurated: 2 January 2007; 19 years ago
- Owner: Malaysia External Trade Development Corporation

Technical details
- Floor count: 24
- Floor area: 106,000 m^{2} (1,140,000 sq ft)

Website
- mecc.matrade.gov

MATRADE Exhibition and Convention Centre (MECC) (Malay: Pusat Pameran dan Konvensyen MATRADE) is a trade centre, exhibition hall, and convention centre in the suburb of Segambut, Kuala Lumpur, Malaysia. MECC, established by MATRADE (Malaysia External Trade Development Corporation), provides convention facilities, exhibition halls, and meeting rooms. MATRADE has also allocated a permanent exhibition space for 400 local companies at the exhibition hall on the second floor. The centre is also a component of Naza TTDI’s KL Metropolis development which is expected to be fully completed within 12 to 15 years time.

In operation since 2 January 2007, MECC has hosted many trade related events. The Malaysia International Trade and Exhibition Centre (MITEC), which was a venue for the 2017 Southeast Asian Games, is located nearby.

== Facts ==
- Total exhibition area: 32,888 square meters.
- Indoor exhibition area consisting of Hall A, B, C, Matrade Hall; 8 collapsible and movable partitions for the meeting rooms; theatrette.
- Outdoor exhibition area including an amphitheatre and a 20,000 square meters car park.

== Facilities ==
- Function Rooms
- Meeting Rooms
- Theatrette
- Amphitheatre
- Exhibition Halls

== Major events in MECC ==
- The 8th Malaysia International Food & Beverage Trade Fair.
- Karnival Mega Wanita 2007
- Pet Expo Malaysia - Cat Edition
- Super Home Ideas 2007
- Global SMEs 2007
- Herbal Asia 2007
- Art Expo Malaysia 2007
- INTRADE Malaysia
- Furniture fair
- Malaysia International Halal Showcase (23 - 27 June 2010)
- Malaysia Fashion Week (MFW) on 4 – 7 November 2015

== Transportation ==
Go KL City Bus Magenta line serves here, connecting to nearby KTM Komuter Segambut and MRT Jinjang. It is also served by Rapid KL bus route 851 (from Pasar Seni) and MRT feeder bus route T821 (from MRT Semantan). However, these bus services are limited on weekdays only.

A station on the proposed MRT Circle Line is planned for the area.
