= Jalan Tuanku Abdul Halim =

Road in Malaysia

Jalan Tuanku Abdul Halim (Jalan Duta)
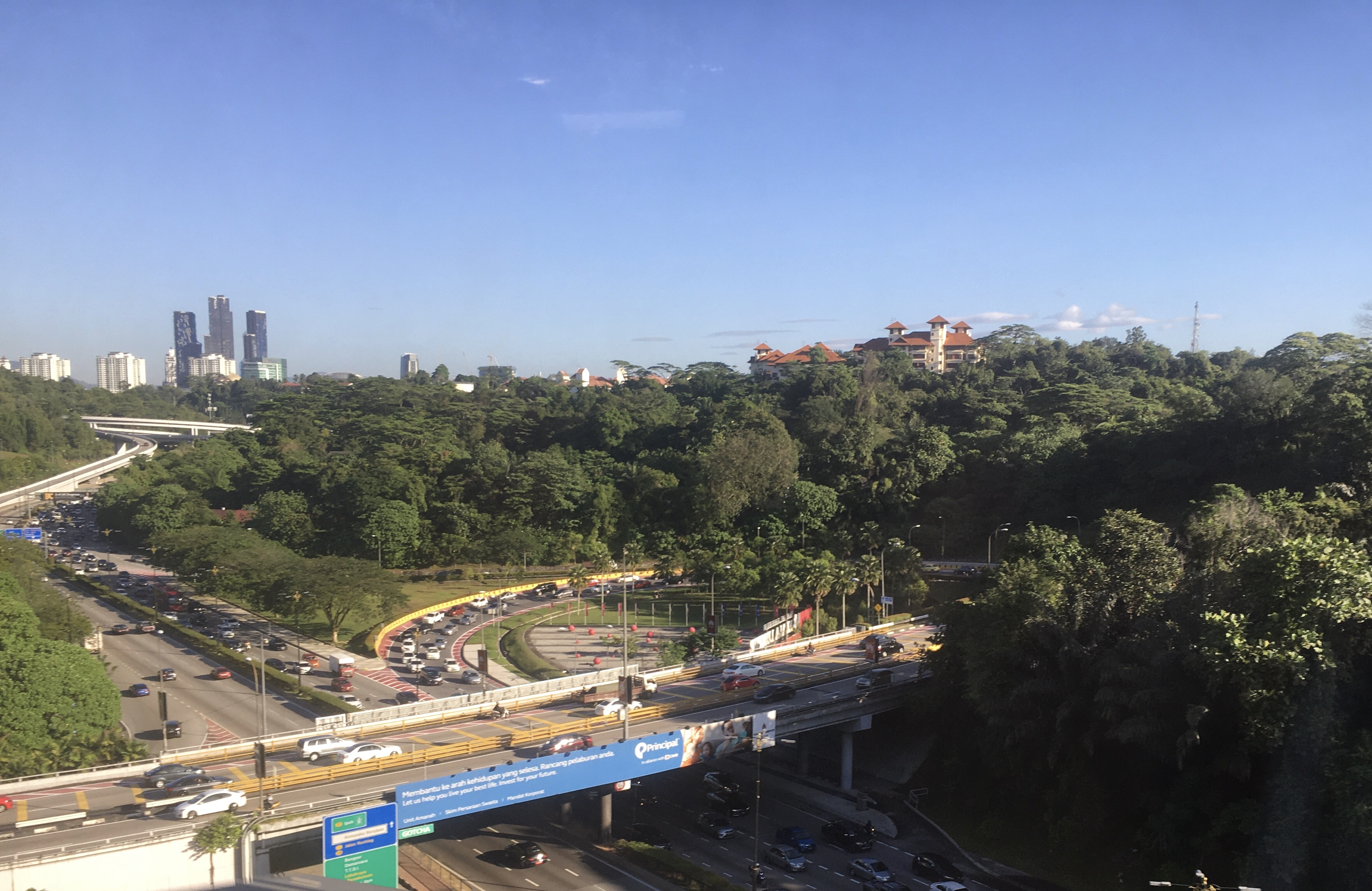
- The Semantan Interchange of Jalan Duta in 2020

Major junctions
- North end: Segambut
- Jalan Sultan Azlan Shah (Jalan Ipoh); Jalan Segambut; FT 1 Kuala Lumpur–Rawang Highway; Jalan Sultan Haji Ahmad Shah New Klang Valley Expressway / AH141; Sprint Expressway; Kuala Lumpur Middle Ring Road 1
- South end: Parliament

Location
- Country: Malaysia
- Primary destinations: Kuantan, Taman Duta, Ipoh, Damansara

Highway system
- Highways in Malaysia; Expressways; Federal; State

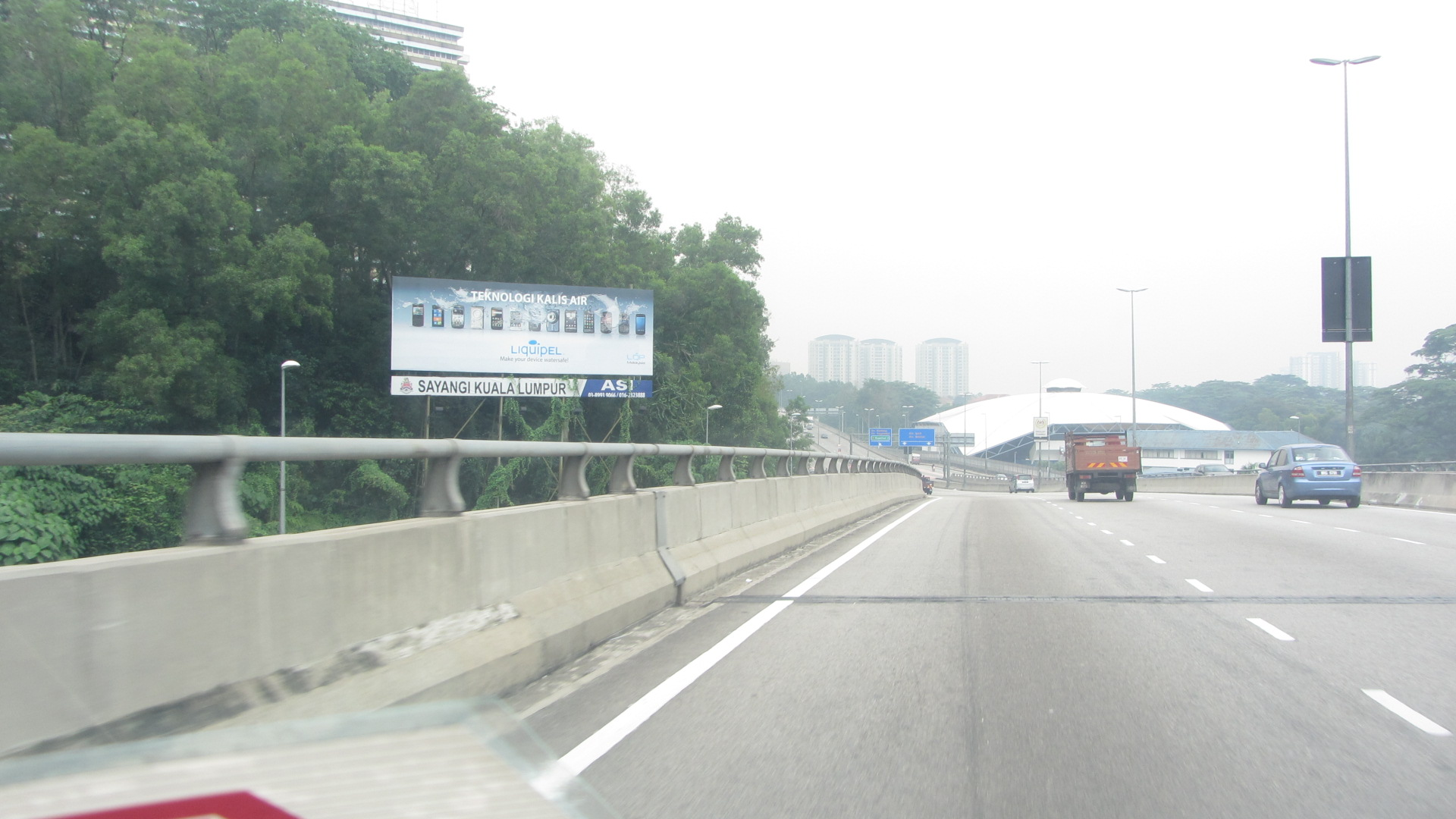
Jalan Duta leading towards Jalan Ipoh and Jalan Sultan Azlan Shah.

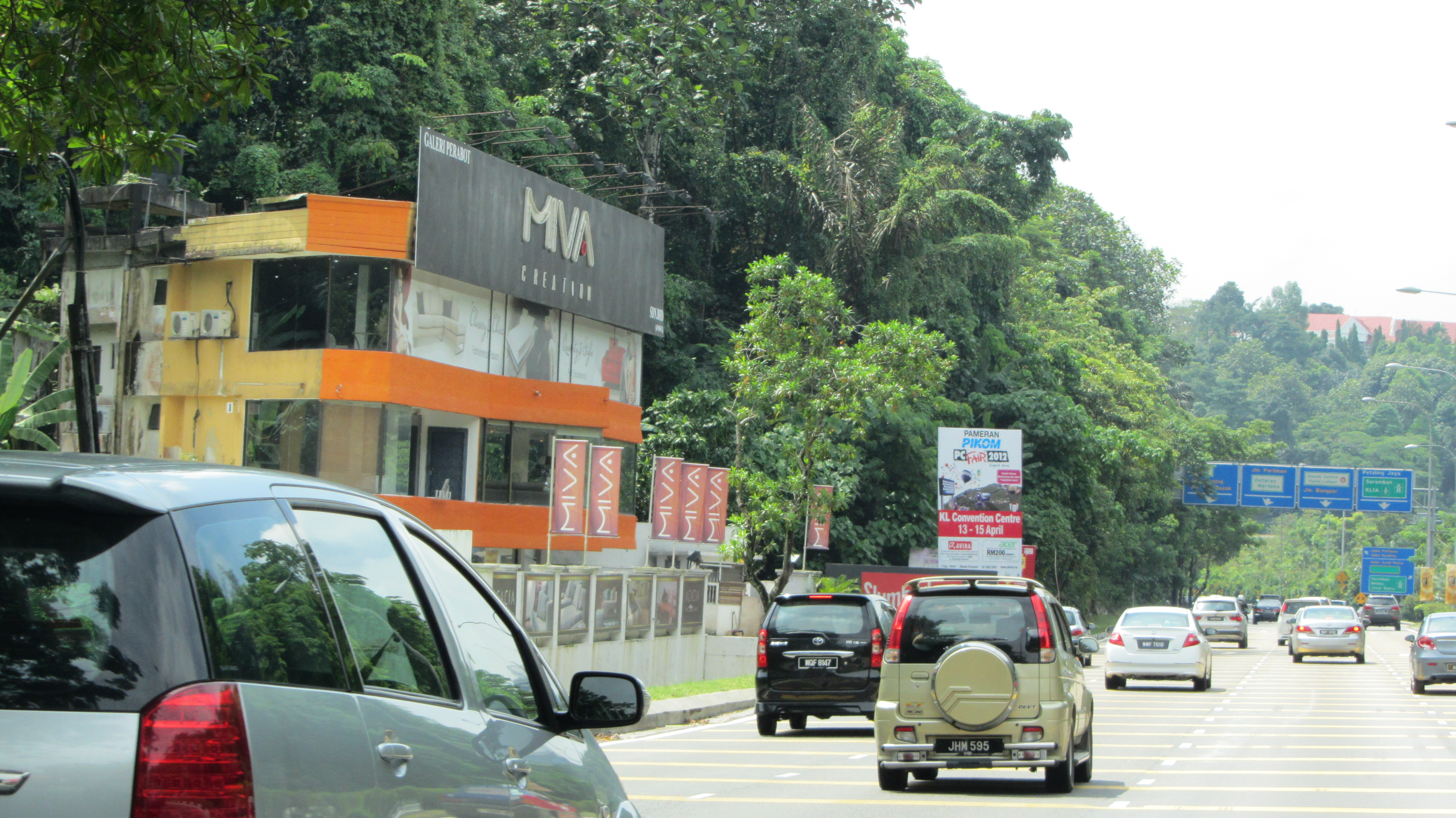
Jalan Duta leading towards Lebuhraya Mahameru (now Lebuhraya Sultan Iskandar).

Jalan Tuanku Abdul Halim, formerly known as Jalan Duta, is a major highway in Kuala Lumpur, Malaysia. It connects Segambut to the Parliament interchange on the Kuala Lumpur Middle Ring Road 1. It was named after the fifth and fourteenth Yang di-Pertuan Agong, Tuanku Abdul Halim Muadzam Shah of Kedah (reigned 1970–1975 and 2011–2016).

== History ==
The road was constructed in the early 1960s, and initially named Guillemard Road after Laurence Guillemard, a British colonial officer.

On 26 November 2014, the Kuala Lumpur City Hall (DBKL) changed the name of Jalan Duta to Jalan Tuanku Abdul Halim. There was public opposition to the renaming, as Jalan Duta was a well-established name and the name change went against the common policy of not naming roads after living public figures, but despite this the government went ahead with the renaming.

=== Segambut roundabout interchange ===
The Segambut roundabout has been upgraded into four-level interchange. It was constructed between 2004 and 2006. The project was led by Malaysian Public Works Department (JKR), Kuala Lumpur City Hall and the main contractor Ahmad Zaki Resources Berhad (AZRB). This four-level interchange was opened to traffic on 26 February 2007.

=== Interchange to the new Istana Negara ===
Meanwhile, the interchange to the new Istana Negara was constructed in 2007 and was completed in 2011.

== Interchange lists ==
The entire route is located in Kuala Lumpur.

Legend:

- I/C - Interchange, I/S - Intersection, RSA - Rest and service area, OBR - Overhead bridge restaurant, R/R - Restaurant and rest plaza, L/B - Layby, V/P - Vista point, TN - tunnel, T/P - Toll plaza, BR - Bridge
- C - Cloverleaf, S - Stack, T-A - Trumpet-A, T-B - Trumpet-B, DT - Directional-T/Y, SDT - Semi-Directional-T/Y, P-Y - Partial-Y, D - Diamond, P-C - Partial cloverleaf, D-D - Diverging diamond, D-R - Direct ramp

Location	km	mi	Exit	Name	Destinations	Notes
Segambut				Segambut	Jalan Ipoh – Kepong, Kepong Roundabout; Jalan Sultan Azlan Shah (Jalan Ipoh south section) – Sentul, City Centre	Interchange
Segambut				Segambut flyover Jalan Segambut I/S	Jalan Segambut – Kampung Baru Segambut	T-Junctions
Segambut			Segambut flyover Sungai Keruh bridge Railway crossing bridge			
Segambut				Segambut flyover Bulatan Segambut I/C	FT 1 Kuala Lumpur–Rawang Highway – Ipoh, Kuantan, Kepong, Kuala Lumpur, Cheras, Seremban	Multi-level stacked roundabout interchange
Segambut				Segambut flyover Arkib Negara Roundabout I/C	Jalan Sultan Mizan Zainal Abidin (Jalan Khidmat Setia) – Arkib Negara, Kuala Lumpur Courts Complex, Jalan Duta Federal Governmental Complex; Langgak Tunku – Bukit Tunku, Institute of Islamic Understanding Malaysia (IKIM)	Roundabout interchange
Taman Duta				Federal Territory Mosque I/C	Jalan Sultan Haji Ahmad Shah (Jalan Khidmat Usaha) – Federal Territory Mosque, MATRADE, Kuala Lumpur Courts Complex, Jalan Duta Federal Governmental Complex, Taman Segambut; Persiaran Tuanku Syed Sirajuddin (Persiaran Duta) – Bukit Tunku, Institut Integriti Malaysia (IIM), Akademi Pencegahan Rasuah Malaysia (APRM)	Diamond interchange
Taman Duta				Tun Razak Hockey Stadium	Tun Razak Hockey Stadium, Hentian Duta	Parliament bound
Taman Duta				Jalan Sri Hartamas Exit	Jalan Sri Hartamas – Sri Hartamas, Duta Tropika, Malaysian Examination Syndicate headquarters	Segambut bound
Taman Duta				Jalan Duta-NKVE I/C	New Klang Valley Expressway / AH141 – Ipoh, Klang, Kuala Lumpur International Airport (KLIA), Johor Bahru Duta–Ulu Klang Expressway / AH141 – Kuantan, Ulu Klang; Sprint Expressway (Kerinchi Link) – Mont Kiara, Taman Tun Dr Ismail, Damansara, Sri Hartamas	Directional T interchange
Taman Duta				Jalan Taman Duta Exit	Jalan Taman Duta – Taman Duta, (India) Indian High Commission	Parliament bound
Taman Duta				New Istana Negara I/C	Istana Negara (National Palace) Ceremonial Main Gate – Visitors centre,	Directional T interchange
Taman Duta				Semantan I/C	Sprint Expressway (Damansara Link) – Damansara Town Centre, Bangsar, Petaling Jaya	Trumpet interchange
Taman Duta				Parliament I/C	Jalan Parlimen – City Centre, Perdana Botanical Gardens (Perdana Lake Gardens), National Monument (Tugu Negara); Kuala Lumpur Middle Ring Road 1 – Sentul, Jalan Tun Razak, Putra World Trade Centre (PWTC), Sungai Besi, Seremban	Interchange
1.000 mi = 1.609 km; 1.000 km = 0.621 mi: Incomplete access

== See also ==
- Kuala Lumpur Inner Ring Road
- Kuala Lumpur Middle Ring Road 1
- Kuala Lumpur Middle Ring Road 2
