= Ministry of Investment, Trade and Industry (Malaysia) =

Government ministry of Malaysia

- Kementerian Pelaburan, Perdagangan dan Industri (MITI) كمنترين ڤلابورن، ڤرداڬڠن دان ايندوستري
- Coat of arms of Malaysia

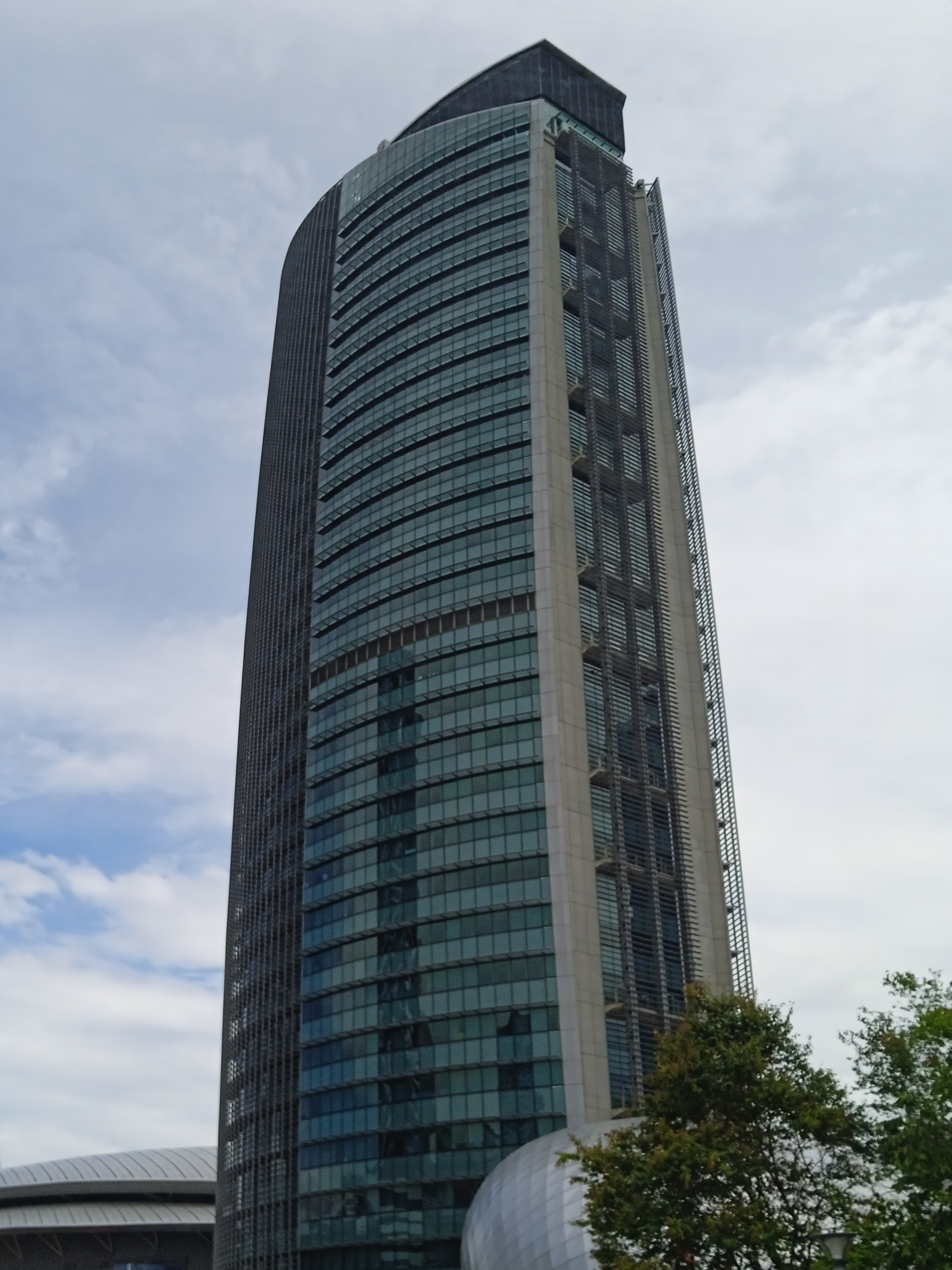

Ministry overview
- Formed: 27 October 1990; 36 years ago
- Preceding Ministry: Ministry of International Trade and Industry
- Jurisdiction: Government of Malaysia
- Headquarters: Menara MITI, No. 7, Jalan Sultan Haji Ahmad Shah, 50480 Kuala Lumpur
- Employees: 959 (2017)
- Annual budget: MYR 1,897,932,800 (2026)
- Minister responsible: Datuk Seri Johari Abdul Ghani, Minister of Investment, Trade and Industry
- Deputy Minister responsible: Sim Tze Tzin, Deputy Minister of Investment, Trade and Industry
- Ministry executives: Dato' Hairil Yahri bin Yaacob, Secretary-General; Datuk Hanafi bin Sakri, Deputy Secretary-General (Industry); Mastura binti Ahmad Mustafa, Deputy Secretary-General (Trade); Datuk Bahria binti Mohd Tamil, Deputy Secretary-General (Investment)
- Website: www.miti.gov.my

Footnotes
- Ministry of Investment, Trade and Industry on Facebook

The Ministry of Investment, Trade and Industry (Malay: Kementerian Pelaburan, Perdagangan dan Industri; Jawi: كمنترين ڤلابورن، ڤرداڬڠن دان ايندوستري), abbreviated MITI, is a ministry of the Government of Malaysia that is responsible for international trade, industry, investment, productivity, small and medium enterprise, development finance institution, halal industry, automotive, steel, strategic trade. The ministry has its headquarters located at Menara MITI on Jalan Sultan Haji Ahmad Shah in Kuala Lumpur and the building is also a component of Naza TTDI’s 75.5-acre KL Metropolis, a mixed development that is envisioned to be the International Trade and Exhibition District for Kuala Lumpur. It is one of the three ministries that has not moved to Putrajaya.

The Minister of Investment, Trade and Industry administers his functions through the Ministry of International Trade and Industry and a range of other government agencies.

Its headquarters is in Kuala Lumpur.

== Organisation ==
- Senior Minister of Investment. Trade and Industry
  - Deputy Minister of Investment. Trade and Industry
    - Secretary-General
      - Under the Authority of Secretary-General
        - Strategic Planning Division
        - Strategic Trade Secretariat Division
        - Legal Advisor Office
        - Management Services Division
        - Internal Audit Office
        - Strategic Communication Unit
        - Key Performance Indicator Unit
        - Integrity Unit
      - Deputy Secretary-General (Trade)
        - Multilateral Trade Policy and Negotiation Division
        - Regional and International Relations Division
        - Bilateral Economic and Trade Relations Division
        - ASEAN Economic Integration Division
      - Deputy Secretary-General (Industry)
        - Sectoral Policy Division
        - Bumiputera Entrepreneurship and Small and Medium Enterprise Division
        - Trade and Industry Support Division
        - Investment Policy and Trade Facilitation Division
        - Services Sector Development Division
        - Trade and Industry Related Emerging Issues Division
      - Deputy Secretary-General (Strategic and Monitoring)
        - Strategic Negotiations Division
        - National Key Economic Areas, Monitoring and Evaluation Division
        - Anugerah Kecemerlangan Industri and Outreach Division
        - Information Management Division
        - MITI Domestics Office
        - MITI Overseas Office

=== Federal agencies ===
1. Malaysian Investment Development Authority (MIDA, Malay: Lembaga Pembangunan Pelaburan Malaysia)(Official site)
2. Malaysia External Trade Development Corporation (MATRADE), or Perbadanan Pembangunan Perdagangan Luar Malaysia. (Official site)
3. Malaysia Productivity Corporation (MPC, Malay: Perbadanan Produktiviti Malaysia) (Official site)
  1. The Special Task Force to Facilitate Business, or Pasukan Petugas Khas Pemudahcara Perniagaan (PEMUDAH). (Official site)
4. SME Corporation Malaysia (SME Corp, Malay: Perbadanan Perusahaan Kecil dan Sederhana Malaysia)(Official site)
5. Small And Medium Enterprise Bank (SME Bank), or Bank Perusahaan Kecil dan Sederhana. (Official site)
6. Malaysian Industrial Development Finance (MIDF, Malay: Pembangunan Industri Kewangan Malaysia)(Official site)
7. Malaysia Automotive Institute (MAI), or Institut Automotif Malaysia. (Official site)
8. Malaysia Steel Institute (MSI), or Institut Keluli Malaysia. (Official site)

== Key legislation ==
The Ministry of Investment, Trade and Industry is responsible for administration of several key Acts:

- Industrial Co-ordination Act 1975 [Act 156]
- Promotion of Investments Act 1986 [Act 327]
- Malaysian Investment Development Authority (Incorporation) Act 1965 [Act 397]
- Malaysia Productivity Corporation (Incorporation) Act 1966 [Act 408]
- Malaysia External Trade Development Corporation Act 1992 [Act 490]
- Countervailing and Anti-Dumping Duties Act 1993 [Act 504]
- Small and Medium Industries Development Corporation Act 1995 [Act 539]
- Safeguards Act 2006 [Act 657]
- Strategic Trade Act 2010 [Act 708]

== Policy Priorities of the Government of the Day ==
- National Automotive Policy
- Iron and Steel Industry Policy

== Background ==
The Ministry of Commerce and Industry was established in April 1956 and situated in Government Office, Jalan Raja. The Ministry was then renamed the Ministry of Trade and Industry in February 1972. On 27 October 1990, the Ministry was separated into two Ministries which are:

- Ministry of International Trade and Industry (MITI)
- Ministry of Domestic Trade and Consumer Affairs (KPDN).

In November 2015, MITI relocated its headquarters from Kompleks Pejabat Kerajaan, Jalan Tuanku Abdul Halim to Menara Miti on Jalan Sultan Haji Ahmad Shah.

On 12 April 2023, it was renamed the Ministry of Investment, Trade and Industry.

== Vision ==
To make Malaysia the preferred investment destination and among the most globally competitive trading nations by 2020.

== Mission ==
- To promote and strategise Malaysia's global competitiveness in international trade by producing high value added goods and services.
- To spur the development of industrial activities towards enhancing Malaysia's economic growth for achieving a developed nation status by 2020.

== Objective ==
To plan, legislate and implement international trade and industrial policies that will ensure Malaysia's rapid development towards achieving National Economic Policy and Vision 2020.

== Key policies ==
- To plan, formulate and implement policies on industrial development, international trade and investment.
- To encourage foreign and domestic investment.
- To promote Malaysia 's exports of manufacturing products and services by strengthening bilateral, multilateral and regional trade relations and co-operation.
- To enhance national productivity and competitiveness in the manufacturing sector.

== Client's Charter ==
- To process online applications for:
  - Iron & Steel Approved Permit (AP):
    - import AP: 5 working days;
    - import AP via ePermit: 2 working days;
    - export AP: 2 working days.
  - AP for other products:
    - import: 5 working days;
    - export: 3 working days;
    - personal vehicle: 14 working days.
- To process online applications for certificate of origin within 24 working hours upon receiving complete documentation.
- To process applications for Bumiputera Special Shares within 21 working days from the approval dates for shares listing by Securities Commission of Malaysia.
- To resolve complaints about MITI within 15 working days from the date the complaint is received.
- To achieve at least 85% for external customer satisfaction of MITI services.
- 95% payment of bills to be done within 7 working days.
- Tender and Quotation results to be published in the MITI's portal within 2 working days after the date of supplier confirmation based on the Letter of Acceptance.

== Legal Framework ==
The Federal Constitution allows Parliament to make laws related to trade, commerce and industry that include:

- production, supply and distribution of goods; price control and food control; adulteration of foodstuffs and other goods;
- imports into, and exports from, the Federation;
- incorporation, regulation and winding up of corporations other than municipal corporations (but including the municipal corporation of the federal capital); regulation of foreign corporations; bounties on production in or export from the Federation;
- insurance, including compulsory insurance;
- patents; designs, inventions; trade marks and mercantile marks; copyrights;
- establishment of standards of weights and measures;
- establishment of standards of quality of goods manufactured in or exported from the Federation;
- auctions and auctioneers;
- industries; regulation of industrial undertakings;
- subject to item 2(c) in the State List: Development of mineral resources; mines, mining, minerals and mineral ores; oils and oilfields; purchase, sale, import and export of minerals and mineral ores; petroleum products; regulation of labour and safety in mines and oilfields;
- factories; boilers and machinery; dangerous trades; and
- dangerous and inflammable substances.

== Ministers ==
Minister	Portrait	Office	Executive Experience
Johari Abdul Ghani		Minister of Investment, Trade and Industry	MP for Titiwangsa (May 2013 – May 2018; November 2022 – current); Chairman of the UDA Holdings Berhad (July 2013 – July 2015); Deputy Minister of Finance (July 2015 – June 2016); Minister of Finance (June 2016 – May 2018); Chairman of the Asset Recovery Task Force on the 1Malaysia Development Berhad scandal (March 2023 – current); Minister of Plantation and Commodities (December 2023 – December 2025)
Sim Tze Tzin		Deputy Minister of Investment, Trade and Industry	MLA for Pantai Jerejak (March 2008 – May 2013); MP for Bayan Baru (May 2013 – current); Deputy Minister of Agriculture and Agro-based Industry (July 2018 – February 2020)

== See also ==
- Minister of Investment, Trade and Industry (Malaysia)
- Deputy Minister of Investment, Trade and Industry
