= Segambut Komuter station =

Railway station in Malaysia

Coordinates: 3°11′11″N 101°39′51″E

Segambut

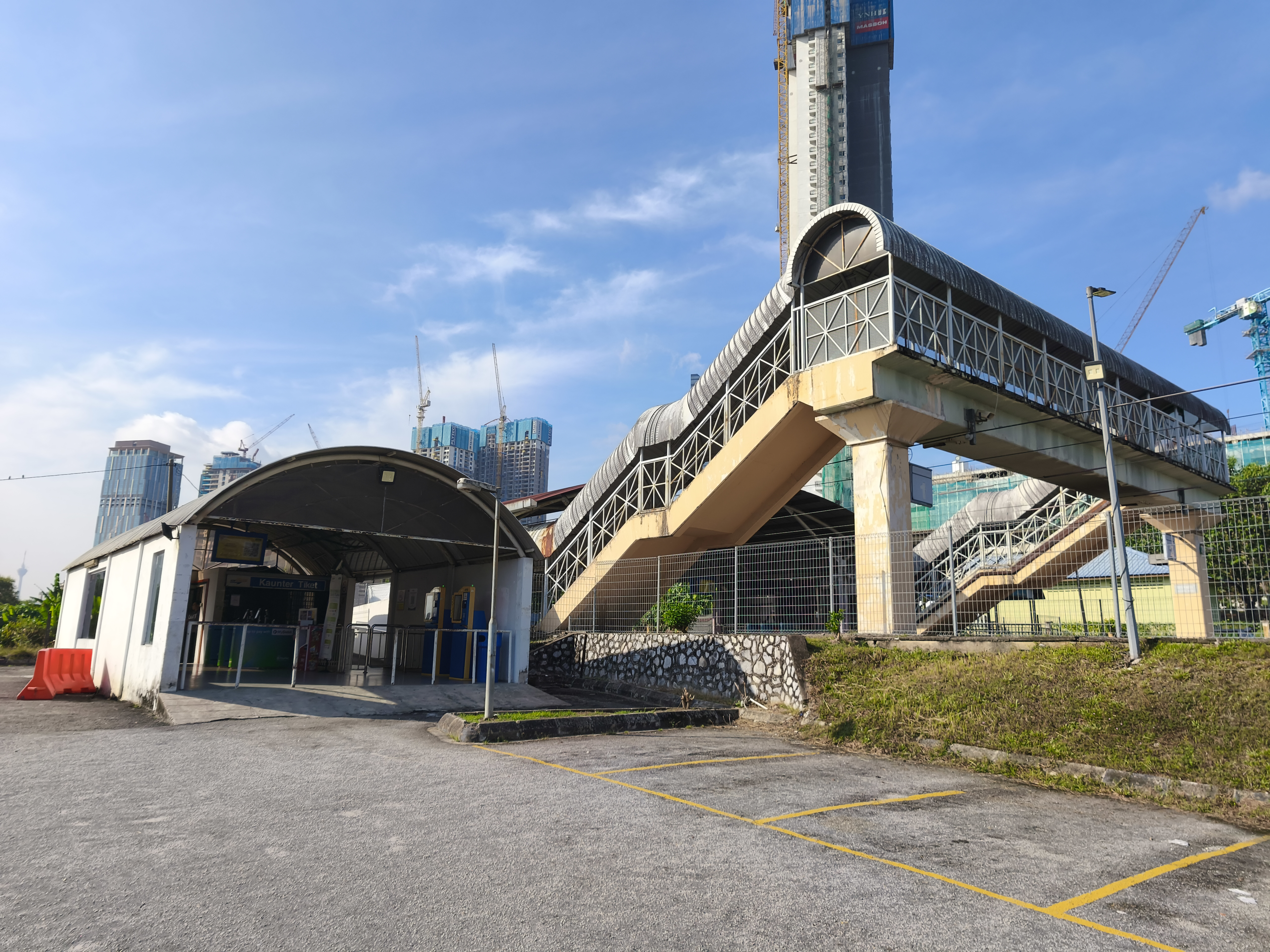
- The station in 2025

General information
- Other names: Malay: سݢامبوت (Jawi); Chinese: 泗岩沫; Tamil: சிகாம்புட்
- Location: Segambut, Kuala Lumpur, Malaysia.
- System: KA05 | Commuter rail station
- Owner: Keretapi Tanah Melayu
- Line: West Coast Line
- Platforms: 2 side platform
- Tracks: 2

Construction
- Parking: Available, free

Other information
- Station code: KA05

History
- Opened: 1892
- Rebuilt: 1995
- Electrified: 1995

Services
Preceding station	Keretapi Tanah Melayu (Komuter)	Following station
Segambut Utara towards Tanjung Malim	Tanjung Malim–Port Klang Line	Putra towards Port Klang
Location

The Segambut KTM Komuter station (formerly Segambut railway station) is a Malaysian commuter train station located in the northern area of Kuala Lumpur along the Tanjung Malim–Port Klang Line.

The Segambut Komuter station was built to cater for traffic in Segambut, a suburban area situated near Kepong, which is also connected via the Kepong Komuter station and the Kepong Sentral Komuter station a few kilometres away.

The Segambut Komuter station was built before 1892 but expanded and electrified in 1995. This station was planned in the 1990s to be a terminus for KL Monorail's extension route from Titiwangsa station, which never materialised.

== Feeder buses ==
Route No.	Origin	Desitination	Via
190	KA05 Segambut Komuter station (route beginning from Medan Pasar)	Mont Kiara; Segambut Dalam	Jalan Segambut; Jalan Kiara 3 Jalan 19/70a
GOKL 13 (Magenta)	KA05 Segambut Komuter station (route beginning from PY11 Jinjang MRT station)	Publika MATRADE Exhibition and Convention Centre; Federal Territory Mosque	Jalan Segambut Persiaran Dutamas; Jalan Tuanku Abdul Halim; Jalan Dutamas 1
T819	KA05 Segambut Komuter station (route beginning from KG14 Semantan MRT station)	KL Sentral	DUKE toll road Jalan Duta

== Around the station ==
- Segambut industrial area
- Kuala Lumpur Courts Complex
- Jalan Duta
- MATRADE Exhibition and Convention Centre
- Mont Kiara
- Sri Hartamas
