= Malaysia International Halal Showcase =

Annual Islamic trade show in Malaysia

Malaysia International Halal Showcase Pameran Halal Antarabangsa Malaysia
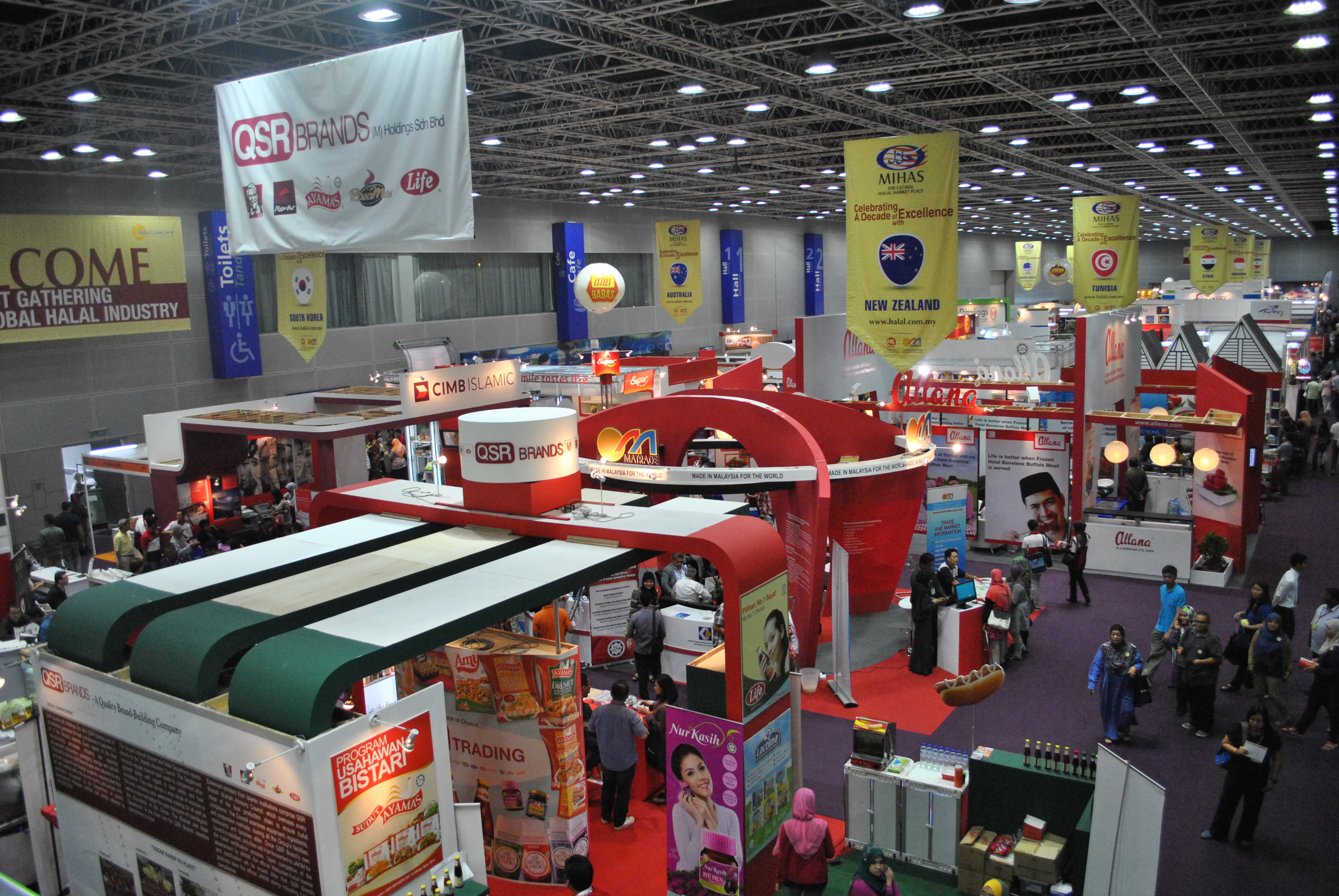
- MIHAS exhibition halls in 2016
- Status: Active
- Genre: Trade fair
- Frequency: Annual
- Venue: Kuala Lumpur Convention Centre
- Locations: Kuala Lumpur, Malaysia
- Country: Malaysia
- Inaugurated: 2004
- Attendance: 17,254 (2004)
- Organizer: Malaysia External Trade Development Corporation (MATRADE)
- Website: www.mihas.com.my

The Malaysia International Halal Showcase (MIHAS; Malay: Pameran Halal Antarabangsa Malaysia) is an annual trade fair organised by the Malaysia External Trade Development Corporation and managed by Shapers Malaysia (formerly Indah Profiles), as MIHAS Secretariat. It aims to facilitate the sourcing and selling of quality halal products and services globally.

MIHAS first started in 2004, is typically held in April in Kuala Lumpur, Malaysia and the event runs for four days. For the past few years, the event is held at the Kuala Lumpur Convention Centre.

== Background/History ==
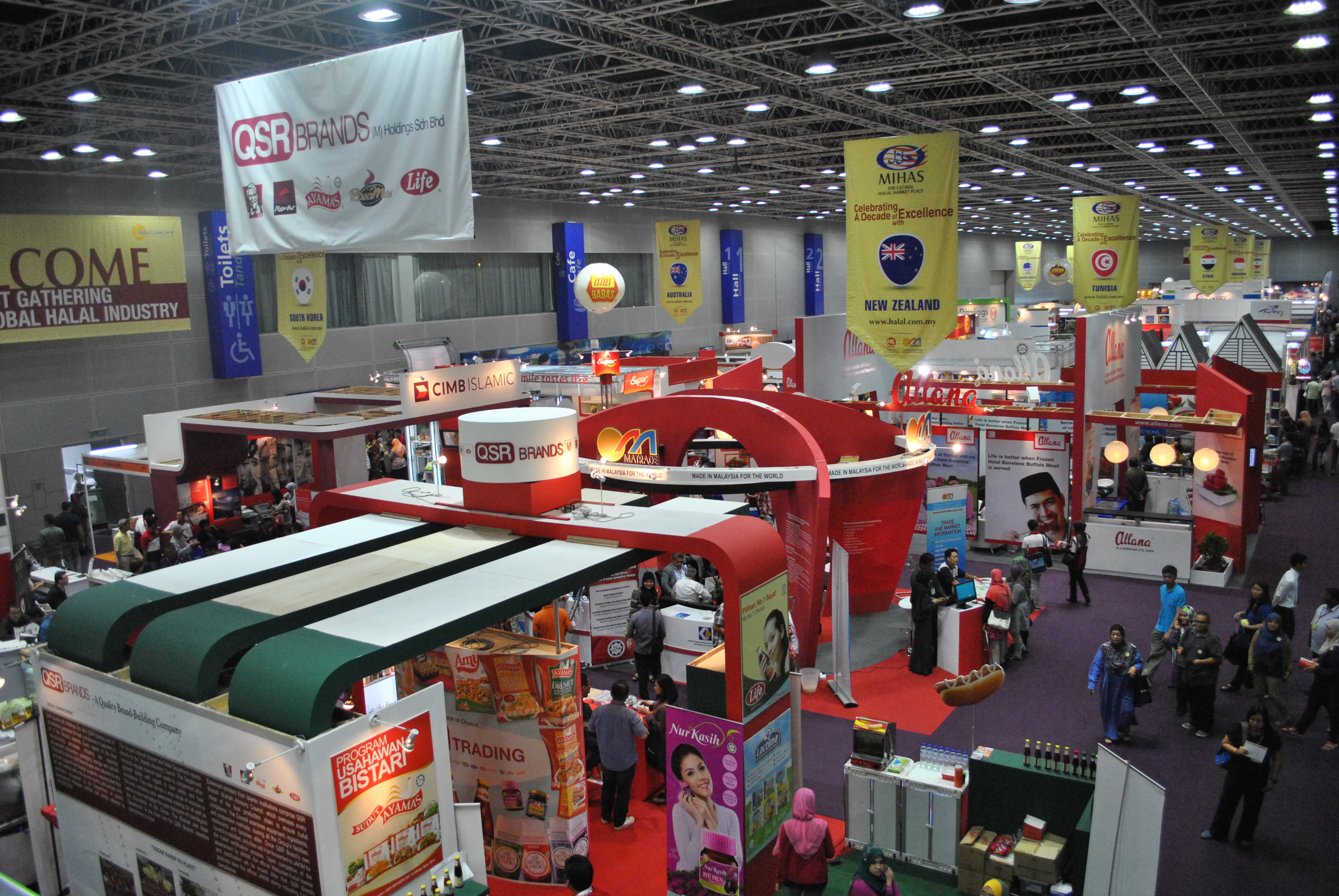
MIHAS exhibition halls

MIHAS was founded by Shapers Malaysia in 2004 and in 2008, ownership of this Halal event was transferred to the Malaysian government under the auspices of the Malaysia External Trade and Development Corporation (MATRADE).

MIHAS was first held in 2004 at the Malaysia International Exhibition & Convention Centre (MIECC), Mines Resort City, Kuala Lumpur. The inaugural event was officiated by the (now former) Prime Minister of Malaysia, Tun Abdullah Haji Ahmad Badawi. That year, there were 330 companies occupying 505 booth spaces from 19 different countries including Malaysia, the country host. MIHAS attracted 17,254 visitors from 42 countries that year.

== Programmes ==
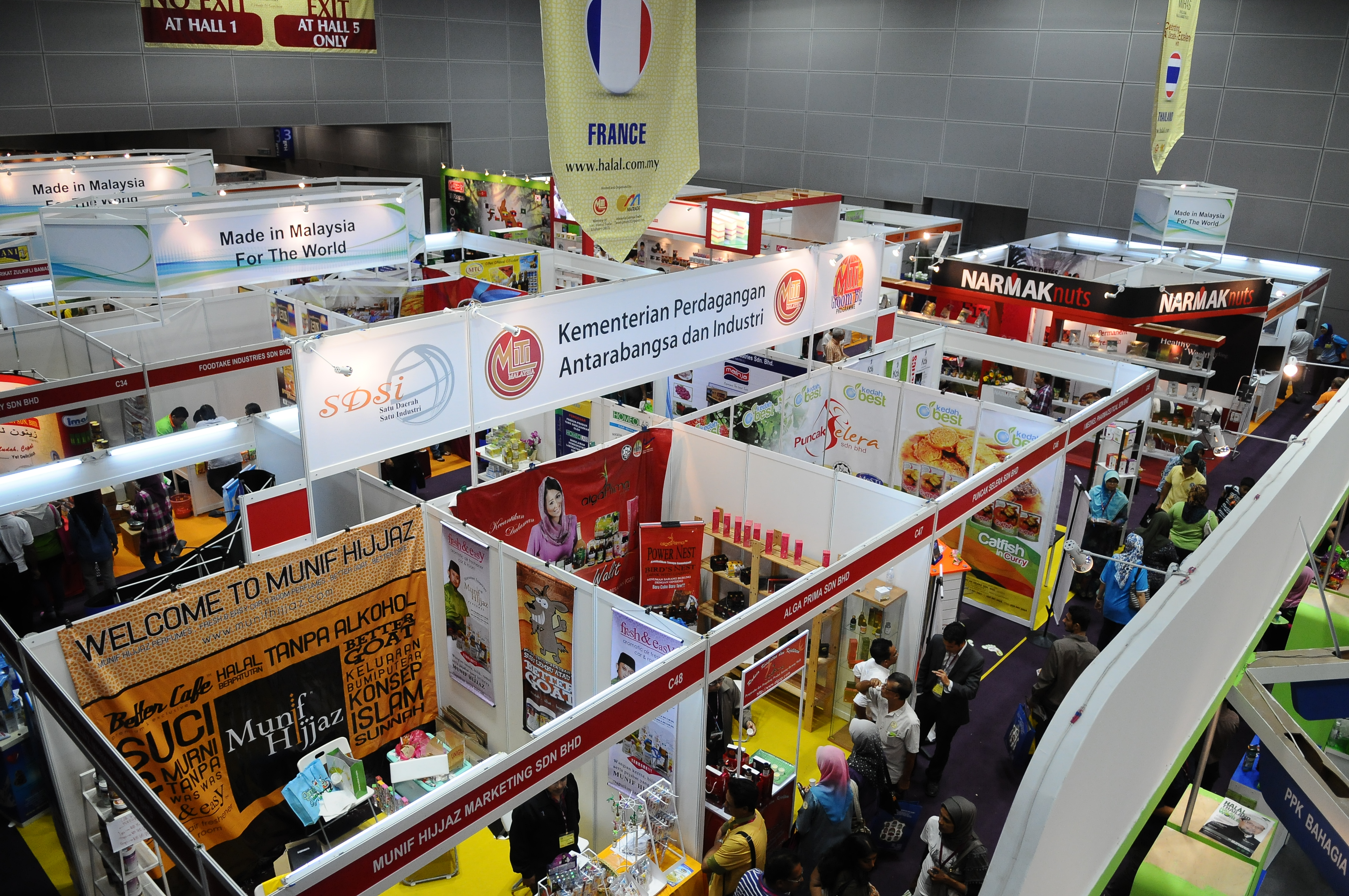
Various booths at MIHAS

Incoming Buying Mission (IBM) programme was first introduced during MIHAS 2005. The business matching programme provides one-to-one discussions and business negotiations between buyers and sellers. The first year resulted in a total sales of RM229.9 million. The programme has been a staple of MIHAS ever since. In 2012, the business matching sessions yielded a total generated sales of RM340 million (USD110 million).

IBM is wholly organised by MATRADE and it is conducted a day before the trade show. The participants consists of international buyers from all over the globe who are looking to source Halal products.

There are various Activities by Exhibitors throughout the event that include press conference, product briefing, product launching and signing ceremonies, as well as cooking demonstrations on the exhibition floor. These activities are conducted within the exhibition halls, either at the exhibitor booths or the Media Village.

The 14th Edition of MIHAS was held from 5–8 April 2017.
