= PEMUDAH =

Special Task Force to Facilitate Business
- Pasukan Petugas Khas Pemudahcara Perniagaan (PEMUDAH)
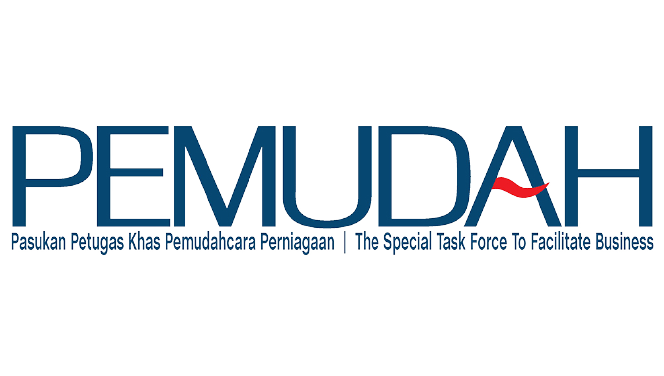

Agency overview
- Formed: 7 February 2007; 19 years ago
- Type: Task Force
- Jurisdiction: Government of Malaysia
- Headquarters: Malaysia Productivity Corporation (MPC), Jalan Sultan, Lorong Produktiviti, 46200 Petaling Jaya, Selangor
- Agency executives: YBhg. Tan Sri Shamsul Azri bin Abu Bakar, Co-Chair (Chief Secretary to the Government); YB Tuan Haji Akmal Nasrullah bin Mohd Nasir, Co-Chair (Minister of Economy); Datuk Wira (Dr.) Hj. Ameer Ali Mydin, Co-Chair (Advisor, Federation of Malaysian Business Associations)
- Parent department: Prime Minister's Department (Malaysia)
- Website: www.pemudah.gov.my

The Special Task Force to Facilitate Business (Malay: Pasukan Petugas Khas Pemudahcara Perniagaan; PEMUDAH) is a Malaysian government task force under the Prime Minister’s Department. Established on 7 February 2007, it seeks to improve the ease of doing business in Malaysia by fostering collaboration between the public and private sectors, streamlining regulations, and promoting a more competitive business environment.

== History ==
PEMUDAH was first announced by Prime Minister Abdullah Ahmad Badawi in his annual address to the civil service on 11 January 2007 and officially launched on 7 February 2007. Its creation drew inspiration from the World Bank Group’s Doing Business Report, which evaluates economies on regulatory efficiency. The task force adopted a co-chair model, with the Chief Secretary to the Government serving as one chair and a private-sector leader as the other.

In its early years, PEMUDAH helped Malaysia achieve strong rankings in the Doing Business Report, including 20th place out of 181 economies in 2009. During the COVID-19 pandemic in Malaysia, the task force responded to the challenges posed by the Movement Control Orders by convening private-sector meetings starting in April 2020. These discussions addressed issues such as workforce availability, supply chains, logistics, cash flow, and worker vaccinations, with recommendations forwarded to the Economic Action Council.

In July 2020, PEMUDAH collaborated with the MyMudah initiative and the Unified Public Consultation (UPC) Portal to ease regulatory bottlenecks affecting economic recovery. The state-level model was later replicated with the launch of PEMUDAH Pahang in 2021.

Following the World Bank’s decision to discontinue the Doing Business Report in 2021, PEMUDAH underwent a major restructuring (implemented in 2022) to shift its focus toward broader strategic national priorities and key economic sectors.

== Governance ==
PEMUDAH is currently co-chaired by Shamsul Azri Abu Bakar (Chief Secretary to the Government), Akmal Nasir (Minister of Economy), and Ameer Ali Mydin (Advisor to the Federation of Malaysian Business Associations).

== Structure and operations ==
Originally, PEMUDAH aligned its work with the ten key indicators used in the World Bank’s Doing Business Report. It operated through focus groups, each co-chaired by a senior public official and a private-sector leader, and including civil servants, professionals, and business representatives. These groups reviewed Malaysia’s performance against international benchmarks and proposed regulatory improvements.

A dedicated PEMUDAH Working Group on Efficiency Issues (WGEI) met monthly to triage regulatory concerns and assign them to the appropriate focus groups. Approved recommendations were then escalated as needed. The WGEI was later replaced by technical working groups. After the 2021–2022 restructuring, PEMUDAH expanded its scope and began promoting Good Regulatory Practice (GRP) principles, including through stakeholder webinars and outreach.

== Impact and recognition ==
PEMUDAH has played a notable role in strengthening Malaysia’s business environment and public-private collaboration. Its work contributed to improved rankings in the former Doing Business Report and supported broader efforts to reduce bureaucracy and enhance competitiveness.

The task force continues to advocate for minimal yet effective regulation while maintaining zero tolerance for corruption. Its public-private model has influenced similar initiatives at the state level, such as PEMUDAH Pahang.

The World Bank’s publication Aiming High highlighted areas for further reform in Malaysia—such as reducing market distortions, encouraging innovation, and improving the investment climate—that align closely with PEMUDAH’s ongoing objectives.
