= Kuala Lumpur Courts Complex =

- Kompleks Mahkamah Kuala Lumpur
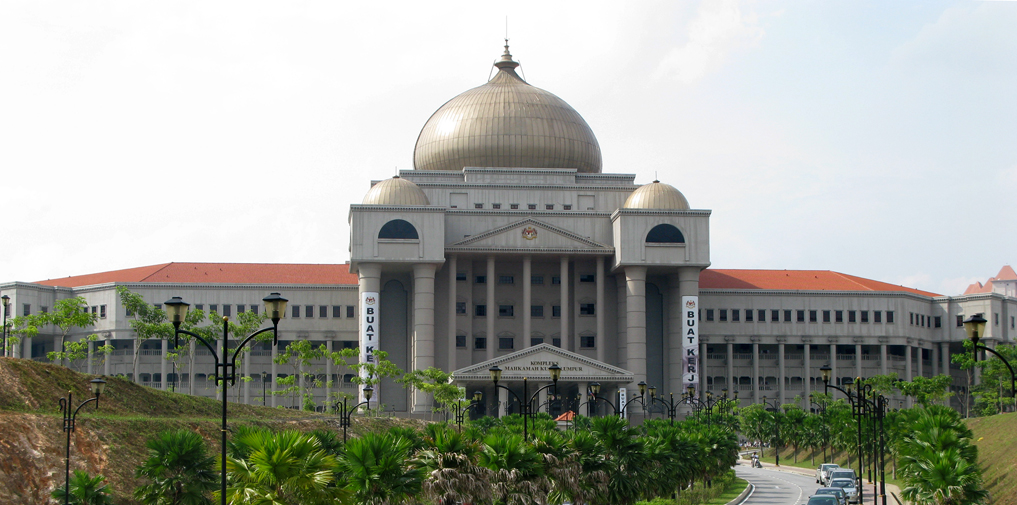

General information
- Status: Completed
- Type: High Court
- Architectural style: Islamic; Moorish; Palladian and Neoclassicism
- Location: Kuala Lumpur, Malaysia
- Coordinates: 3.1769°N 101.6710°E
- Groundbreaking: 2004
- Construction started: 2004
- Completed: 2007
- Inaugurated: 2007

Technical details
- Floor count: 5

The Kuala Lumpur Courts Complex (Malay: Kompleks Mahkamah Kuala Lumpur) is a large courthouse complex in Kuala Lumpur, Malaysia, housing various courts of the country's judicial system. The complex is situated along Jalan Duta (Duta Road) in Segambut, some 4 kilometres (2.5 mi) away from the earlier location of the judicial system at a collection of colonial buildings affront Merdeka Square. The building was constructed beginning 1 March 2004 at a final cost of RM290 million, was opened for use on 18 April 2007, and was fully operational on 3 May 2007.

== History ==
The Kuala Lumpur Courts Complex houses the High Court, the Sessions Court and the Magistrates' Court of Kuala Lumpur. Night courts are also conducted to handle cases pertaining to traffic offences.

The Kuala Lumpur Courts Complex was primarily planned to hold a larger number of relevant court cases at once, as well as centralise judicial branches in the city into one building. Prior to the complex's opening, courts in Kuala Lumpur were scattered among several former colonial municipal buildings affront the Merdeka Square (among them, the Sultan Abdul Samad Building), as well as Wisma Denmark, the embassy of Denmark cum office building in Dang Wangi that housed the Civil High Court. The fate of the buildings at the Merdeka Square were left to the Tourist Minister to determine.

== Structure ==
=== Architecture ===
The architecture of the Kuala Lumpur Courts Complex was meant to bear similarities to architectures of colonial municipal buildings, evoking hints of neoclassical architecture, Palladian architecture, as well as Mughal and Westernised styling exemplified by the Sultan Abdul Samad Building.

In addition to its symmetrical U-shaped floor plan, the Kuala Lumpur Courts Complex features a central portico that rises above the rest of the building, and features a large onion dome surrounded by four semi-spherical domes; each of the building's left and right wings has an additional set of three porticos and four semi-spherical domes. The building is adorned with colonnades of varied diameters and height of two to five floors, with verandahs behind the front and rear facades of the building's two wings.

=== Layout and amenities ===
The complex, which consists of a single large structure is planned in a U-shaped design with a left and right wing, and has a total of six above-ground levels, of which five from the bottom each contain a collection of numbered courtrooms. Courtrooms are situated at either wings of the building, while the registrars, registries and filling counters are located closer to the center of the building. In all, the complex contains 30 courtrooms for the High Courts, 21 for the Sessions Courts and 26 for the Magistrates' Courts. Administration offices and surau's for men and women are situated on the 6th floor, the top floor of the complex. The complex is touted as the second largest courthouse in the world, although it was claimed to be the largest in the world earlier.

The complex is additionally intended to contain a library, a business centre, tunnel access to holding rooms for the accused, as well as televisions for four courtrooms to air court hearings. Closed-circuit television cameras and Wireless Internet connectivity are also to be made available within the complex's vicinity. E-Court facilities that would enable court procedures to be done over the Internet were also planned. The building, which is sited on 12 ha of land, is surrounded by landscaping with rest areas and a mini park for the public.

500 parking bays for the public, 300 bays for court staff and 200 bays for judges and magistrates were also prepared in the Kuala Lumpur Courts Complex. Parking has been a major woe for the public as they are allocated merely 500 parking spaces which has to be shared with lawyers. In solving this problem, numerous steps have been taken which includes allocating special designated area for lawyers to park their vehicles, all mentions before the Sessions Court or Magistrate Judges are rescheduled to be heard in the afternoon at 2.00 p.m. (MST) (on Friday, 2:45 p.m.) and also implementing shuttle service to the new court complex .

=== Technical failures ===
Within a month of opening, the courts complex experienced a series of faults and technical failures, raising questions of the building's reliability and the parties involved in the construction of the building.

The problems were reported to have started even before occupancy, beginning April:

- Cracks measuring at least 3m long were reported in early April.
- On 30 April 2007, just over a week after occupancy, two (four feet by four feet) ceiling panels and a downlight collapsed in a Civil Courts room at 10.30 am. No injuries were reported.
- Less than a week after the ceiling panel collapse, cracks measuring at least 3m long began appearing outside Magistrate's Court 4. The cracks were since patched up.
- On 7 May 2007, the air conditioning in a High Court room malfunctioned.
- On 23 May 2007, the cafeteria of the complex was flooded starting 9.15am as a result of a burst pipe endcap from a service room. The flowing water affected three-quarters of the cafeteria, and reached a depth of 7 cm. Water supply was cut 15–25 minutes later, and three hours of cleaning work was needed for a return to normalcy. Public Works Department director-general Selvanayagam P. Nagalingam attributed the fault to a plumber, who he claims had defaulted on following design specifications, but added that only two sub-standard endcaps were found.

On the same day, a sewage manhole overflowed in the basement of the complex, damaging a number of files for mostly civil cases. Nagalingam was reported to have state the manhole overflow was the result of indiscriminate disposal of sanitary napkins that could have occurred for some time. The blockage was stated to be immediately cleared after Nagalingam learned of the incident at 9.28am that day.

== Transportation ==
The complex is accessible from Segambut station of KTM. Rapid KL bus T821 connects the court to Semantan MRT station on the Kajang Line.

== See also ==
- Law of Malaysia
