= Geography of Kuala Lumpur =

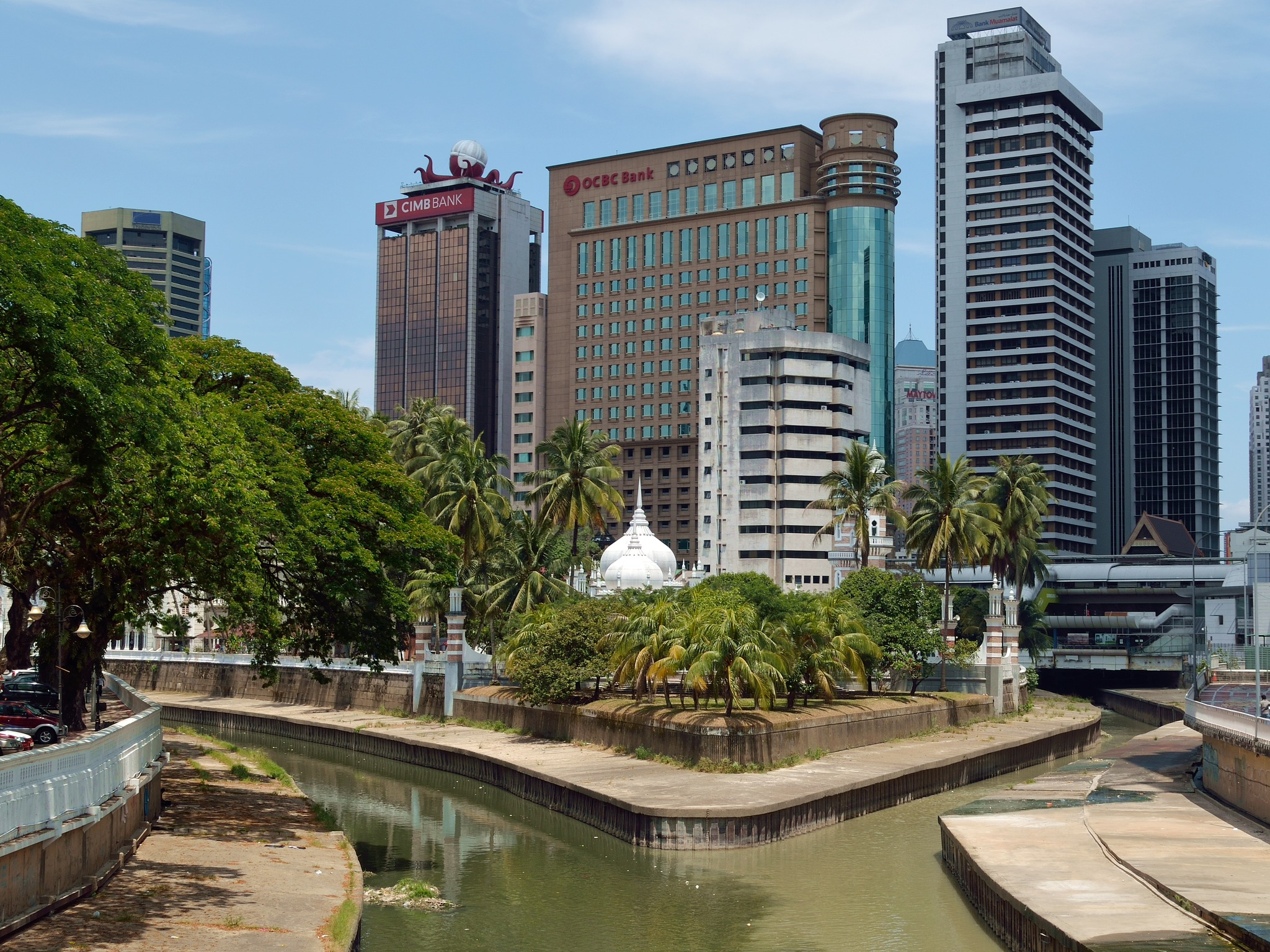
Jamek Mosque at the confluence of Gombak (left) and Klang (right) rivers. The two rivers have different colours due to different stream load.

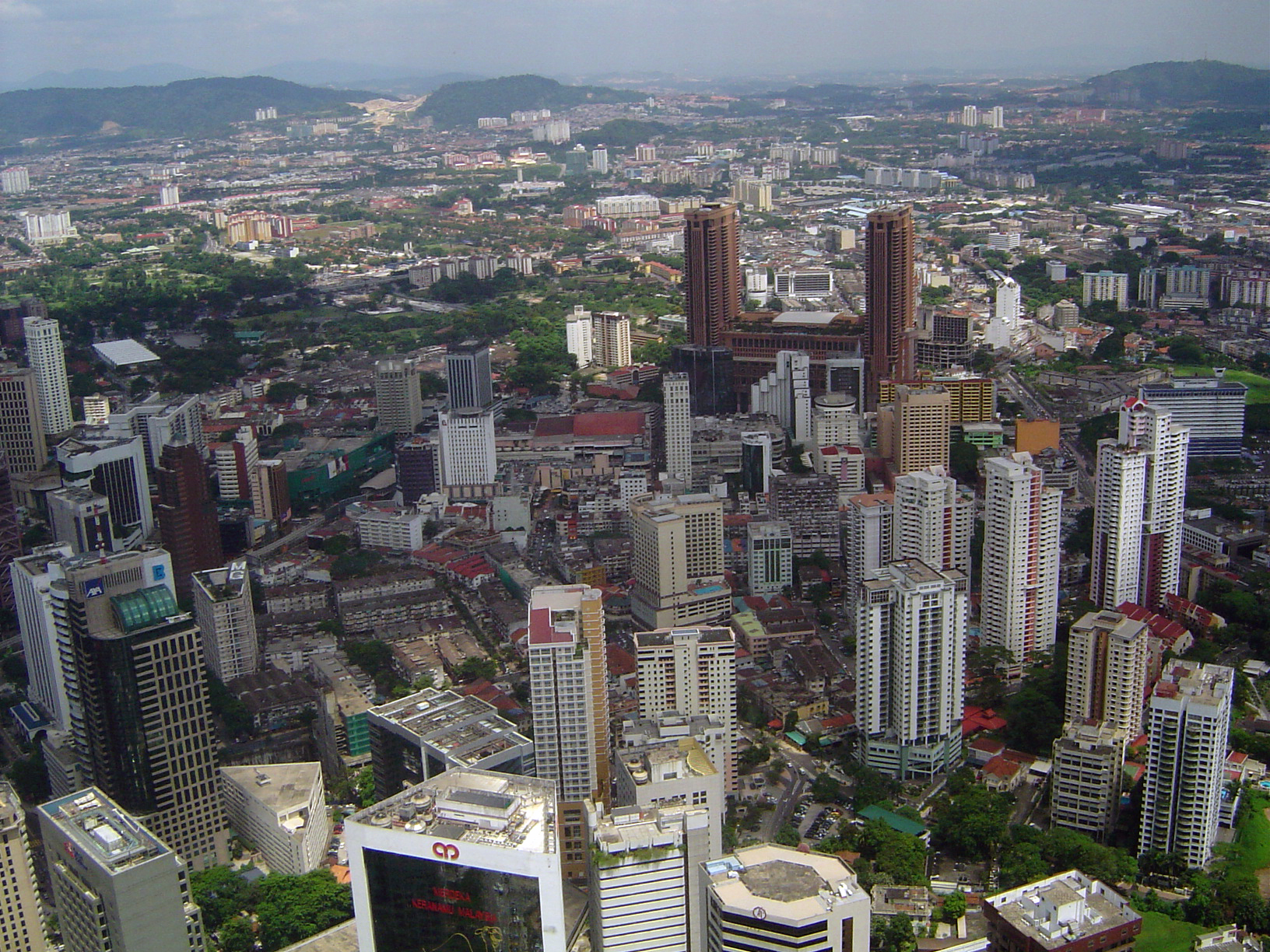
Bukit Bintang in the foreground with the Titiwangsa Mountains in the background.

The geography of Kuala Lumpur, Malaysia is characterized by a huge valley — known as the Klang Valley — bordered by the Titiwangsa Mountains in the east, several minor ranges in the north and the south and the Malacca Straits in the west. The name Kuala Lumpur literally means muddy confluence; Kuala Lumpur is located at the confluence of the Klang and Gombak Rivers, facing the Malacca Straits.

Located in the center of Selangor State, Kuala Lumpur was previously under Selangor state government. In 1974, Kuala Lumpur was separated from Selangor to form today's Kuala Lumpur under the Malaysian Federal Government. Its location on the West Coast of Peninsular Malaysia, which has wider flat land than the East Coast, has contributed to its faster development relative to other cities in Malaysia.

The city is currently 243.65 km^{2} (94.07 sq mi) wide, with an average elevation of 21.95 m (72 ft).

== Environment ==
=== Natural resources ===
Kuala Lumpur is rich in tin.

=== Natural hazards ===
The area is subject to flash flood due to thunderstorms and heavy rain.

=== Pollution ===
Kuala Lumpur has moderate pollution compared to other modern cities in the world. Due to the close proximity of the Sumatra Island, dust particles are carried by wind from perennial but transient forest fires, creating a phenomenon known as the haze.

== Constituencies ==
Map

1. Bukit Bintang is the famous shopping and entertainment district and tourist haven in Kuala Lumpur; the road that runs through it is called Jalan Bukit Bintang.
2. Titiwangsa
3. Setiawangsa
4. Wangsa Maju was a site of the Setapak rubber estate from the 1900s until the 1980s. The township was opened on 1984. Today Wangsa Maju has become one of the largest townships in Kuala Lumpur after Bandar Tun Razak and Bandar Tasik Selatan in Cheras.
5. Batu
6. Kepong is located near Selayang in Selangor.
7. Segambut
8. Lembah Pantai
9. Seputeh
10. Bandar Tun Razak was renamed in the year 1981 by the 4th Prime Minister, Datuk Seri Dr. Mahathir Mohamed. The township was previously known as Kampung Konggo (or Congo Village), as this area was a settlement for a number of former/retired Malaysian army personnel who served in Congo, Africa in the 1960s under the United Nations banner; a number still live in this area.
11. Cheras covers a large geographic area in the eastern side of Kuala Lumpur.
