= Malaysia External Trade Development Corporation =

External Trade government agency of Malaysia

- MATRADE

Agency overview
- Formed: March 1993; 33 years ago
- Jurisdiction: Government of Malaysia
- Headquarters: Menara MATRADE, Jalan Sultan Haji Ahmad Shah, 50480 Kuala Lumpur, Malaysia
- Agency executives: YBrs. Abu Bakar Yusof, Chief Executive Officer; Reezal Merican Naina Merican, Chairman
- Parent agency: Ministry of Investment, Trade and Industry Malaysia
- Website: www.matrade.gov.my

The Malaysia External Trade Development Corporation (Malay: Perbadanan Pembangunan Perdagangan Luar Malaysia; officially abbreviated as MATRADE) is a Malaysian external trade government agency. Its key role is to assist Malaysian exporters to develop and expand their export markets. The agency was established under the MATRADE Act 1992 in March 1993 as a statutory agency and external trade promotion arm under the Ministry of Investment, Trade and Industry Malaysia (MITI).

MATRADE is also the owner and operator of the MATRADE Exhibition and Convention Centre (MECC) which was opened in January 2007. Tan Sri Dr. Halim Mohammad served as the 7th Chairman of MATRADE from 2004 to 2010 and effective 1 January 2019. Reezal Merican Naina Merican has served as the 9th Chairman of MATRADE since May 2023.

== Overview ==
MATRADE is under the administration of the Ministry of Investment, Trade and Industry of Malaysia and established in March 1993 under the MATRADE Act 1992 and responsible to promote and execute trade initiatives in Malaysia and helping Malaysian companies and enterprises to achieve success in the international market.

== Vision and mission ==
- Positioning Malaysia As A Globally Competitive Trading Nation
- Promoting Malaysia's Enterprises To The World
