= Segambut =

Subdistrict in Kuala Lumpur, Malaysia

Coordinates: 3°11′N 101°39′E

- Suburb
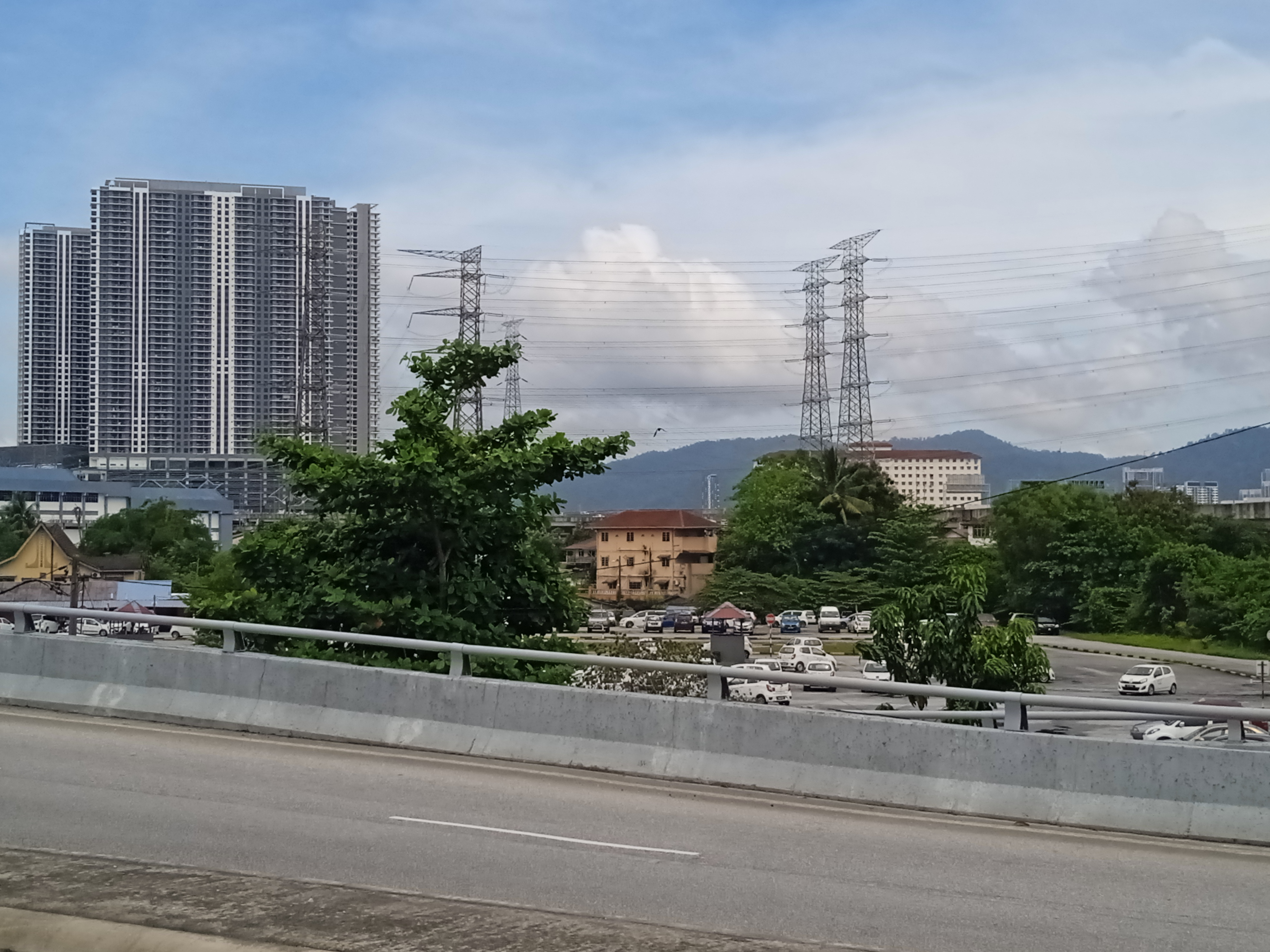
- View of Segambut
- Interactive map of Segambut
- Country: Malaysia
- State: Federal Territory of Kuala Lumpur
- Constituency: Segambut (federal constituency)

Government
  - Local Authority: Dewan Bandaraya Kuala Lumpur
  - Mayor: Mhd Amin Nordin Abdul Aziz
- Time zone: UTC+8 (MST)
- Postcode: 51200, 50480, 50490
- Dialling code: +603-61, +603-62, +603-20
- Police: Segambut

Segambut is a sub-district in Kuala Lumpur, Malaysia. The federal constituency represented in the Dewan Rakyat is Segambut (federal constituency).

== Education ==
The French School of Kuala Lumpur is located in Segambut. Its current campus opened in 2005. The Mont'Kiara International School and Garden International School are international schools located within Mont Kiara while the Cempaka International School is located within Damansara Heights.
