= Damansara Town Centre =

Township in Federal Territory of Kuala Lumpur

Coordinates: 3.1469615°N 101.6621025°E

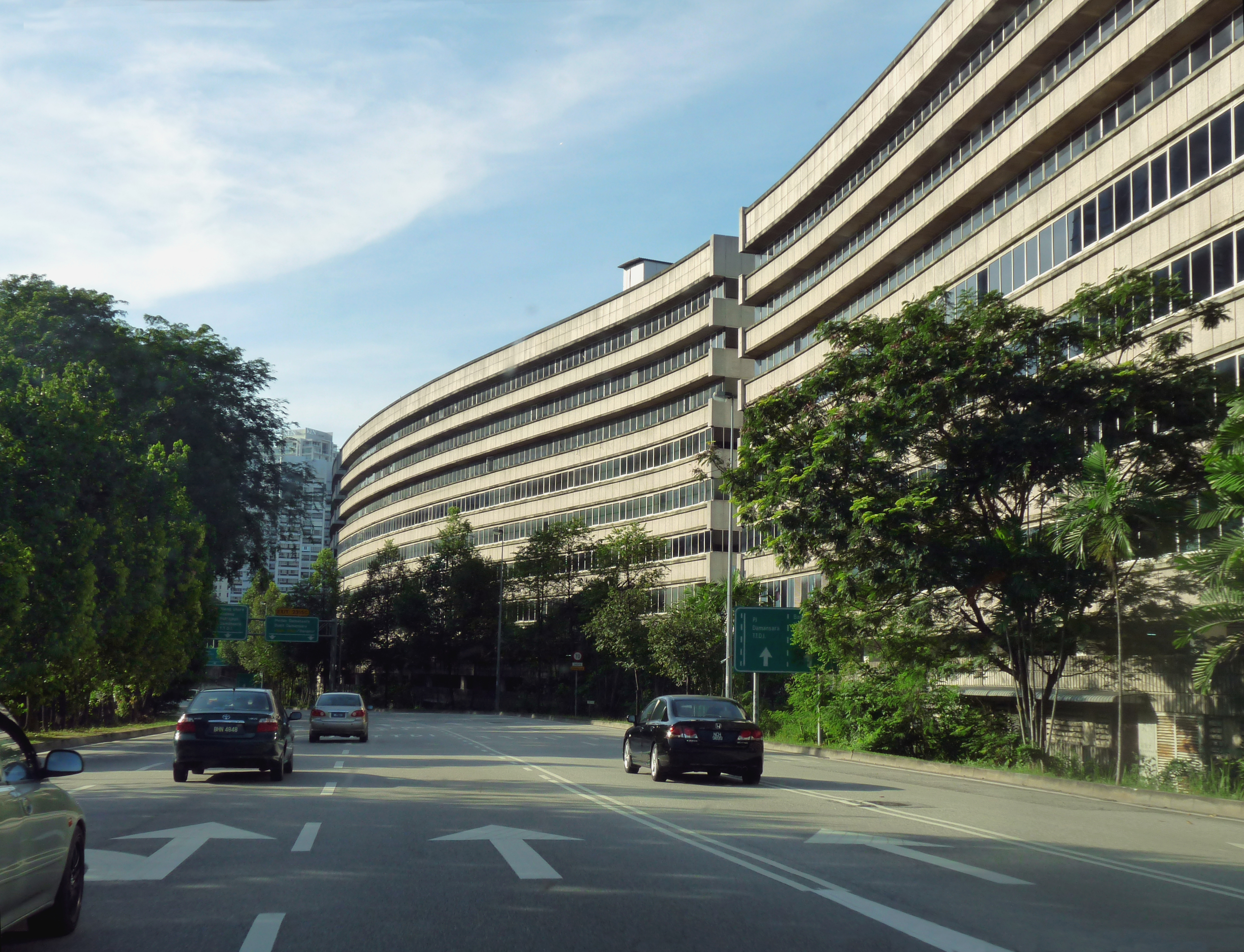
A section of the Damansara Town Centre building as seen from Sprint Expressway

Pusat Bandar Damansara (English: Damansara Town Centre) is a township in the Segambut constituency of Kuala Lumpur, Malaysia. The original buildings making up the township were constructed between 1981 and 1984, and were demolished in 2016 for new development.

== Background ==
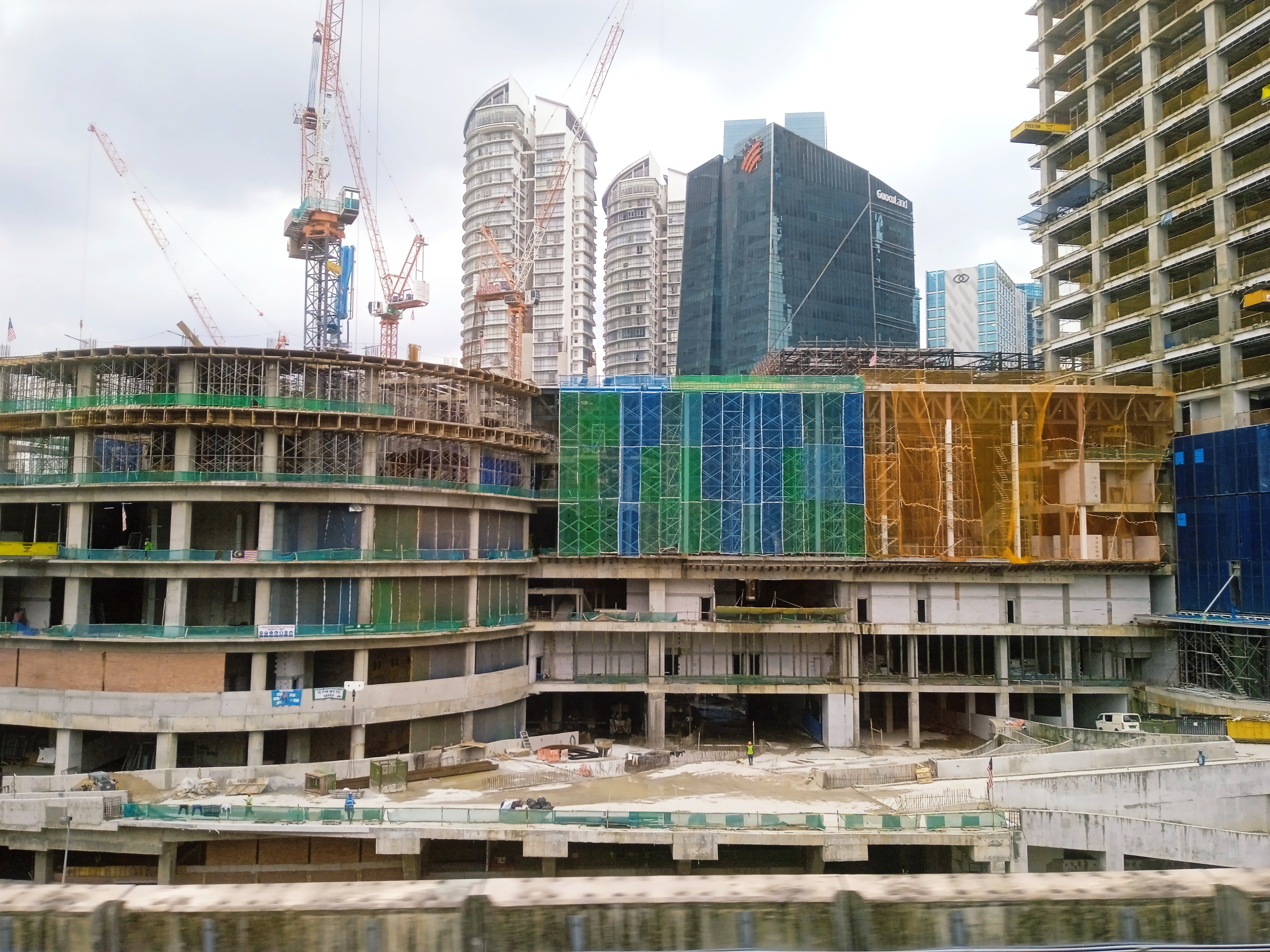
Construction of Pavilion Damansara Heights.

Offices in the original buildings of Damansara Town Centre were occupied by government ministries, departments and private corporations such as Damansara Realty Berhad, Indah Water Konsortium, HELP University College and Johor Corporation (J-Corp). Department of Immigration Malaysia and Ministry of Housing and Local Governments Malaysia used to have their offices here and have since moved to Putrajaya, while passport renewal services were relocated to Pudu Sentral several years ago. Restaurants, convenience stores and supermarkets were located on the ground floor.

During the upgrading of Jalan Damansara into Sprint Expressway's Damansara Link in 2000, the town centre became an "island" between separate carriageways. In 2011, the Twins@Damansara Heights condominium block opened, the first of many high-rise buildings to come. In 2014 it was announced that the original buildings of Damansara Town Centre will be demolished and redeveloped as office buildings, apartments, a hotel and a mall which was later known as Pavilion Damansara Heights, a sister development to Pavilion Kaula Lumpur in Bukit Bintang in downtown Kuala Lumpur.

== Access ==
=== Public transport ===
Damansara Town Centre lends its name to, and is served by, the Pusat Bandar Damansara and Semantan MRT stations. These stations once served as the only connection between the Kajang MRT Line and KL Sentral by RapidKL bus T819, while waiting for opening of the Semantan-Kajang stretch in July 2017.

Besides the aforementioned T819 route, the MRT station also serves as a bus hub for RapidKL buses connecting Damansara Town Centre to Segambut/Sri Hartamas, Mid Valley Megamall and the Ampang and Sri Petaling Lines' Bandaraya station.

== List of roads ==
- Jalan Damanlela
- Jalan Damansutera
- Jalan Damansari
- Jalan Damansuria
