= Pusat Bandar Damansara MRT station =

Railway station in Damansara Town Centre, Malaysia

KG13 Pavilion Damansara Heights – Pusat Bandar Damansara
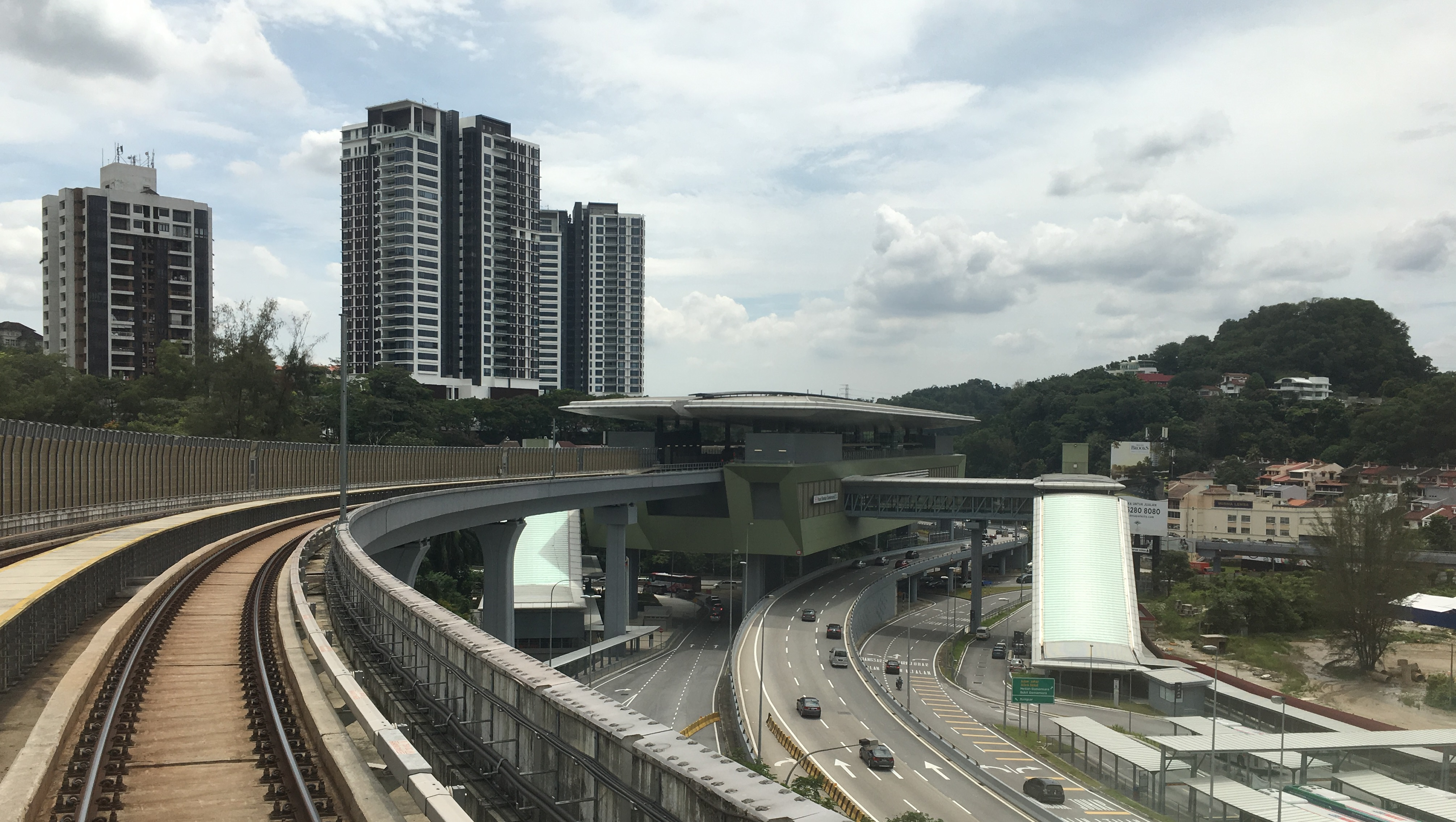
- Pusat Bandar Damansara MRT station

General information
- Other names: Malay: ڤوست باندر دامنسارا (Jawi); Chinese: 白沙罗市中心; Tamil: டாமன்சாரா நகர மையம்
- Location: Intersection of Jalan Maarof and the Sprint Expressway, Bangsar; 50490 Kuala Lumpur; Malaysia
- Coordinates: 3°8′36.28″N 101°39′44.07″E
- System: Rapid KL
- Owner: MRT Corp
- Operator: Rapid Rail
- Line: 9 Kajang Line
- Platforms: 2 side platforms
- Tracks: 2

Construction
- Structure type: Elevated
- Parking: Available with payment. 580 parking bays; 30 motorcycle bays.
- Cycle facilities: Available. 30 bicycle bays.

Other information
- Station code: KG13

History
- Opened: 16 December 2016; 9 years ago

Services
Preceding station		Following station
Phileo Damansara towards Kwasa Damansara	Kajang Line	Semantan towards Kajang
Bukit Kiara Selatan towards Kwasa Damansara	Kajang Line Future service	Semantan towards Kajang
Location

The Pusat Bandar Damansara MRT Station, also known as Pavilion Damansara Heights–Pusat Bandar Damansara MRT Station under the station naming rights programme, is a mass rapid transit (MRT) station serving the areas of Damansara Town Centre, Damansara Heights and Bangsar in Kuala Lumpur, Malaysia.

It is one of the stations of the MRT Kajang Line and was opened on 16 December 2016 when Phase One of the line became operational.

== Station features ==
=== Station location ===
The station adopts the standard elevated station design for the MRT Kajang Line, with two side platforms above the concourse level. The station is located above the two-level Maarof Interchange of the Sprint Expressway, making it among the highest elevated stations above ground level of the MRT Kajang Line.

The station is located adjacent to the Pavilion Damansara Heights development, and a direct connection was built between the retail area of the development and the station.

=== Station layout ===
L2	Platform Level	Side platform
L2	Platform Level	Platform 1: 9 Kajang Line towards KG35 Kajang (→)
L2	Platform Level	Platform 2: 9 Kajang Line towards KG04 Kwasa Damansara (←)
L2	Platform Level	Side platform
L1	Concourse	Faregates; ticketing machines; customer service office; station control; shops
G	Ground Level	Entrance A and Entrance B, Feeder bus stops, taxi, car lay-by

=== Exits and entrances ===
The station has two entrances: Entrance A at the Bangsar-bound slip road on the western side of the Maarof Interchange, and Entrance B at the Bangsar and Jalan Johar-bound slip road on the eastern side of the Maarof Interchange.

Entrance B was temporarily closed off due to the construction of the Pavilion Damansara Heights development in August 2021. It was reconstructed with a new exterior as part of the development and reopened on 9 October 2023.

Kajang Line station
Entrance	Location	Destination	Picture
A	West side of Sprint Highway	Feeder bus stop, Help Residence, Menara Bangsar, Bangsar Shopping Centre, Jalan Maarof	
B	East side of Sprint Highway	Pavilion Damansara Heights, Damansara City Mall, Pusat Bandar Damansara, Twins@Damansara Heights, Wisma Lensa, Jalan Johar, Jalan Kasah, Jalan Damanlela	

== Feeder bus services ==
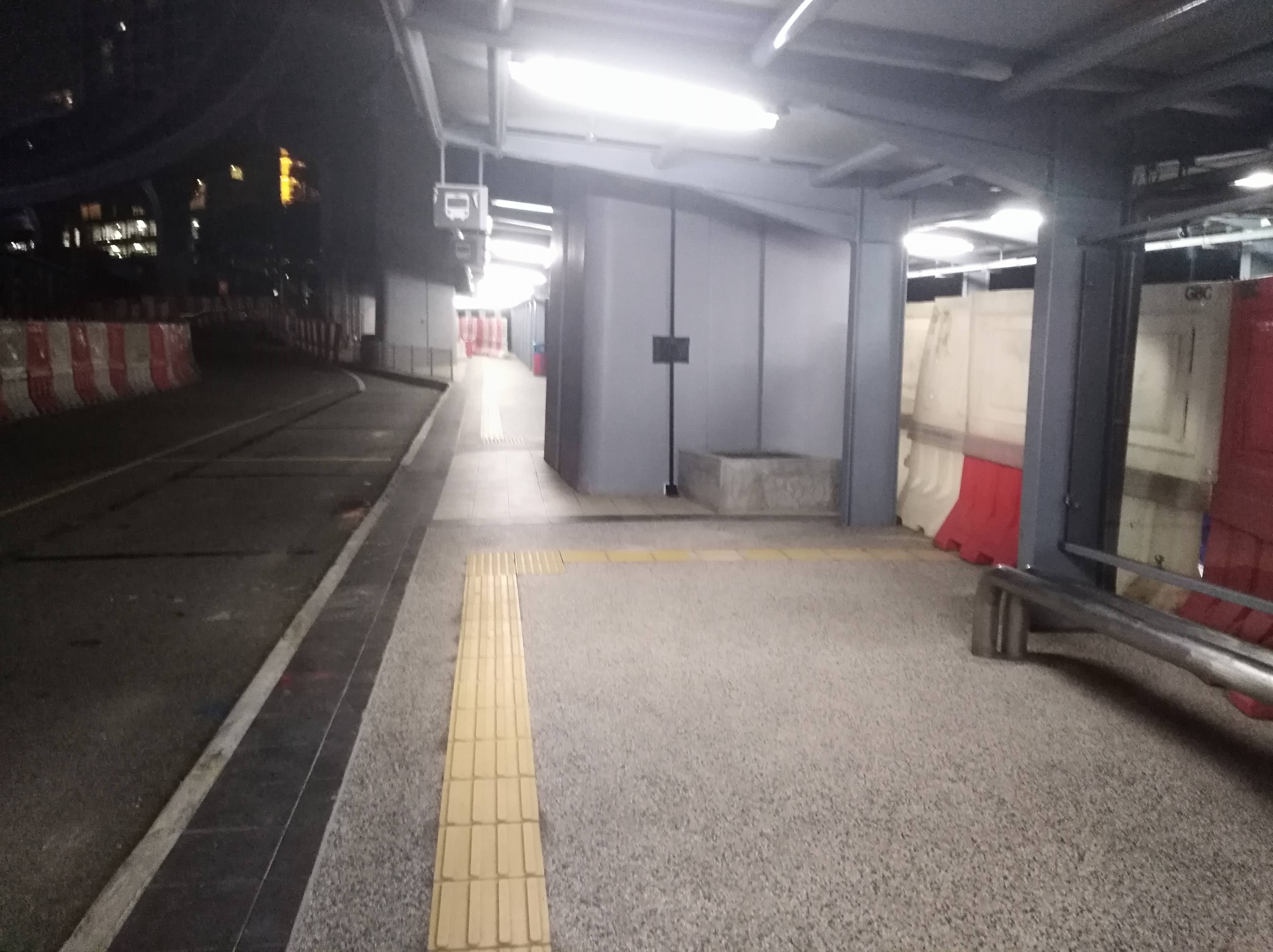
MRT bus station

With the opening of the Kajang Line, feeder buses also began operating linking the station with several residential areas in Damansara Heights and Sri Hartamas as well as the Mid Valley Megamall.

The feeder buses operate from the station's feeder bus hub access via Entrance B of the station, except T817 from Entrance A. With the reconstruction of Entrance B of the station from August 2021, bus routes T818, T819, T820 and T852 will operate from Semantan station instead until further notice.

Route No.	Origin	Destination	Via
T817	KG13 Pusat Bandar Damansara (Entrance A)	Mid Valley Megamall South Court; KB01 Mid Valley	Jalan Johar; Jalan Maarof; Lorong Maarof; Lingkaran Syed Putra
T818	KG13 Pusat Bandar Damansara (Entrance B)	Desa Sri Hartamas (Interchange with Route 190 to KA05 Segambut)	Jalan Johar; Jalan Setia Budi; Jalan Medan Setia; Persiaran Bukit Kiara; Jalan 19/70A
T819	KG13 Pusat Bandar Damansara (Entrance B)	KA05 Segambut; KA01 KS01 KJ15 KE1 KT1 KL Sentral (with access to KG15 Muzium Negara and MR1 KL Sentral Monorail)	Jalan Johar; Jalan Semantan; Jalan 1/42; Pintasan Segambut; Jalan Tuanku Abdul Halim; Jalan Stesen Sentral 5
T820	KG13 Pusat Bandar Damansara (Entrance B)	Kuala Lumpur City Hall Tower; AG6 SP6 Bandaraya; KA03 Bank Negara	Jalan Johar; Jalan Semantan; Jalan Tuanku Abdul Halim; Jalan Parlimen; Jalan Tun Perak; Jalan Raja Laut
T852	KG13 Pusat Bandar Damansara (Entrance B)	Mont Kiara; Sri Hartamas	Sprint Expressway; Jalan Setiabudi; Jalan Setia Murni; Pusat Sains Negara; Persiaran Bukit Kiara; Jalan Sri Hartamas 1 Jalan Dutamas 1 Persiaran Dutamas; Jalan Duta Kiara; Jalan Kiara
