= Pusat Sains Negara =

Science Museum in Kuala Lumpur, Malaysia

National Science Centre
- Pusat Sains Negara
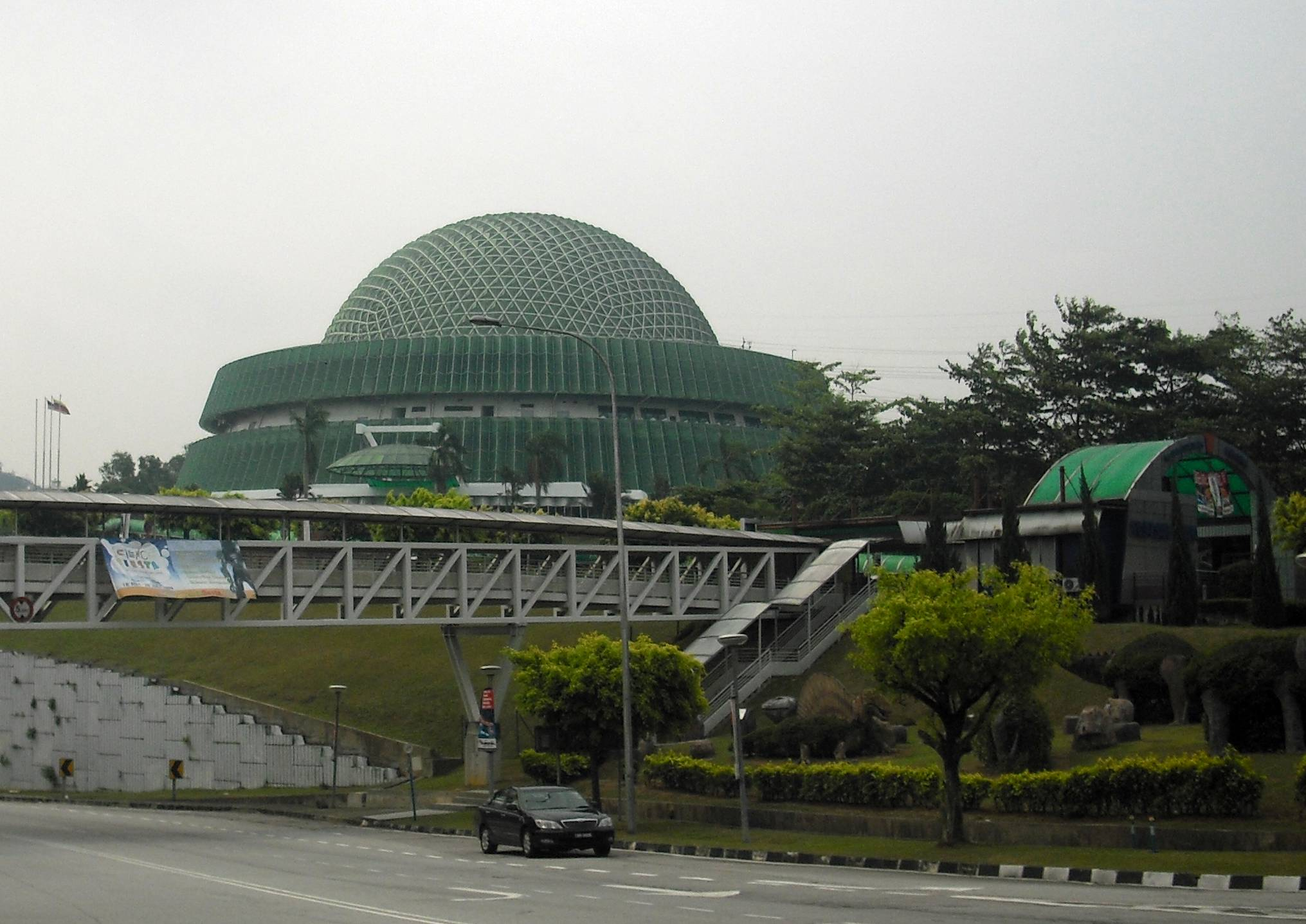
- Established: November 1996
- Location: Persiaran Bukit Kiara, 50662, Bukit Kiara, Kuala Lumpur, Malaysia
- Coordinates: 3.149390°N 101.6425613°E
- Type: Science Centre
- Accreditation: Asia Pacific Network of Science & Technology Centres (ASPAC)
- Website: National Science Centre

Pusat Sains Negara or National Science Centre is a science centre in Kuala Lumpur, Malaysia. Perched atop a hill on 8 hectares of landscaped grounds at Bukit Kiara on the northwestern fringes of the city, the centre was officially opened on 29 November 1996 by Prime Minister Mahathir Mohamad. The main aim of the science centre is to promote greater understanding and interest in science and technology. The building resembles a truncated cone capped with a geodesic dome. Among the themes featured in the exhibition galleries are an environmental odyssey, pathways to discovery, future world and thinking machines. In addition, National Science Center also has a new branch in Mount Keriang, Kedah which opened on 1 March 2010.

== History ==
Plans for a permanent national science centre began in 1978, as a contribution by the private sector to the national development.

The concept was revived in the early 1980s. Council of Scientific Research and Development (NCSRD) has played an important role in their concept of the establishment of a National Science Centre with the objective of which is to create awareness and understanding of science and technology among Malaysians. Given the establishment of a Science Centre with all the requirements is a though that requires research and planning, then proposed the establishment of a temporary Science Center as a preliminary step. For this purpose, a government house at the address JKR 641, Jalan Kelantan, Federal Hill, Kuala Lumpur has been modified.

The National Science Centre opened on 6 April 1986, at a renovated bungalow located at Jalan Kelantan, Kuala Lumpurby YB Datuk Amar Stephen Yong, who doubles as Minister of Science, Technology and the Environment at the time. Since its inception the Science Center has added a collection of exhibits, most of which are of a roadshow.

The dream to create a building came true in 1990 when the National Science Centre project has been approved under the Ninth Malaysia-5 to be implemented under the Ninth Malaysia Plan 6. Construction of building and basic infrastructure began in November 1991. On 27 February 1992, Mr Abdul Ghafar bin Baba (now called "Tun") as Deputy Prime Minister of Malaysia, the project officially National Science Centre in Bukit Kiara, Kuala Lumpur. Construction work continued and was completed in November 1993. Aquarium tunnel construction project began in September 1993 and was completed in August 1994. National Science Centre building design built is unique in that resembles a truncated cone capped by a geodesic dome. This design is a testament to the creative and innovative Public Works Department is also the implementation agency.

The center is equipped with an Integrated Management System (IBMS) and has a two-level exhibition gallery space with an area of 6,717.6 square meters. In the center, there is a multimedia library, a science lab, three workshops, two auditorium and a multipurpose hall. The area surrounding the National Science Center's educational landscape theme and the main feature is an ecological landscape, herb garden and children's playground. The exhibits are available at the National Science Centre landscape focused on the physical and biological sciences as well as exhibits complement the gallery exhibition?

Simultaneously with the construction of the building, an interactive science exhibits were designed by local and foreign experts. Fabrication works for Level 1 exhibits began in August 1994 and was completed in May 1995. Next, fabrication work exhibits Level 2 is starting in October 1995 and was completed in September 1996. To ensure that the exhibits are always in line with the advancement of Science and Technology, the Centre is planning to upgrade the existing exhibits a continuous basis to get the traffic going. After a decade in operation, while the Science Center was officially closed on 15 April 1996. Now, National Science Center has many additional exhibition houses a wide variety of materials for visitors viewing. The building was closed from 1 March to 30 September due to construction reasons. It was then opened at 1 October 2025 after renovations.

== Daily operations ==
Open Saturday to Thursday at 9.00 am - 5.00 pm.

Closed on Fridays for maintenance and on Hari Raya.

== Ticket ==
The tickets can be purchased at the ticket counter inside the building. Walk through the main entrance of the main building towards the information counter. The ticket counter is located near the information counter.

Adult - MYR 6.00

Children - MYR 3.00

== Access ==
Pusat Sains Negara is accessible by rapidKL bus T852 (an MRT feeder route) from Pusat Bandar Damansara MRT station.
