= Pavilion Damansara Heights =

Shopping mall in Kuala Lumpur, Malaysia

Pavilion Damansara Heights Mall
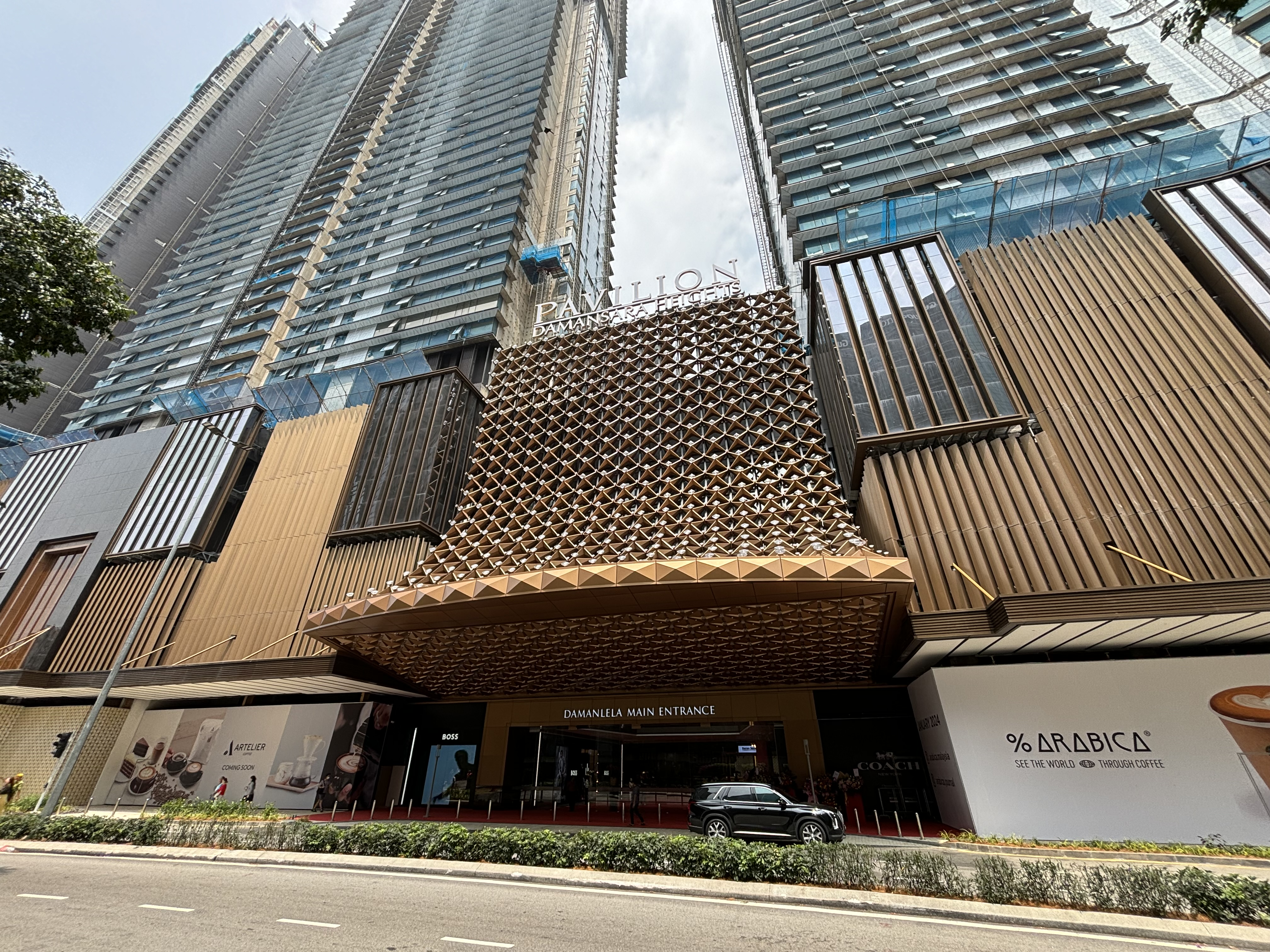
- View of the main entrance from Jalan Damanlela in 2023
- Location: Pusat Bandar Damansara
- Coordinates: 3.14635°N 101.66309°E
- Address: 3, Jalan Damanlela, 50490 Kuala Lumpur, Malaysia
- Opened: 9 October 2023
- Previous names: Pavilion DTC
- Developer: Impian Ekspresi Sdn. Bhd.
- Owner: Pavilion Group
- Num. of stores: 380
- Floor area: 1,100,000 sq ft (100,000 m^{2})
- Floors: 5 (Phase 1), 6 (Phase 2)
- Parking: Phase 1: 1,000+ Phase 2: 800+
- Public transit: KG13 Pusat Bandar Damansara MRT station
- Website: www.pavilion-dh.com

Pavilion Damansara Heights, also known as Pavilion DH or colloquially known as Pavilion 3, is a shopping mall located within the Pusat Bandar Damansara commercial area in Bukit Damansara, Kuala Lumpur, Malaysia.

== Overview ==
Pavilion Damansara Heights is the third mall under the Kuala Lumpur Pavilion brand, which has been operating its flagship Pavilion Kuala Lumpur shopping mall in the Bukit Bintang district as well as Pavilion Bukit Jalil in southern Kuala Lumpur.

It was built as an integrated mixed development on the former site of the Damansara Town Centre complex. The commercial site used to include a number of government headquarters and departments before it was demolished. It was earmarked for a major redevelopment, with deals to acquire the land from Bukit Damansara Development Sdn Bhd through its parent company Damansara Assets Sdn Bhd, a property arm of state-owned Johor Corporation (JCorp).

The whole development is currently being undertaken by Tan Sri Lim Siew Choon's Pavilion Group and Canada Pension Plan Investment Board (CPP Investments) through a 49% joint-venture stake. The plot is 15.84 acres (6.41 ha), with Phase 1 consisting of 9.5 acres while Phase 2 consisting of 6.34 acres. Both phases of the site were developed by Impian Ekspresi Sdn Bhd and Jendela Mayang Sdn Bhd respectively.

== Master plan ==
This complex also features 5 residential blocks, 10 office towers, a 5-star hotel and an event gallery within the retail complex. The retail component of Pavilion Damansara Heights is built in 2 stages, Phase 1 and Phase 2, across 6 levels. The mall was officially opened on 9 October 2023 as part of Phase 1 of the development, while Phase 2 will be followed after.

== Accessibility ==
The mall is connected to the KG13 Pusat Bandar Damansara MRT station of the Kajang Line. From October 2023 to July 2025, a temporary walkway was built to facilitate the link between the mall and the station. Commuters will have to exit at Entrance B of the station and access the ground level via the elevator at the end of the bridge and walk for 5 minutes along the sidewalk to reach the basement level of the shopping mall. The mall's pedestrian overhead bridge, as part of the development's second phase, was opened on 15 July 2025, allowing direct connection with the MRT station.

== Pictures ==
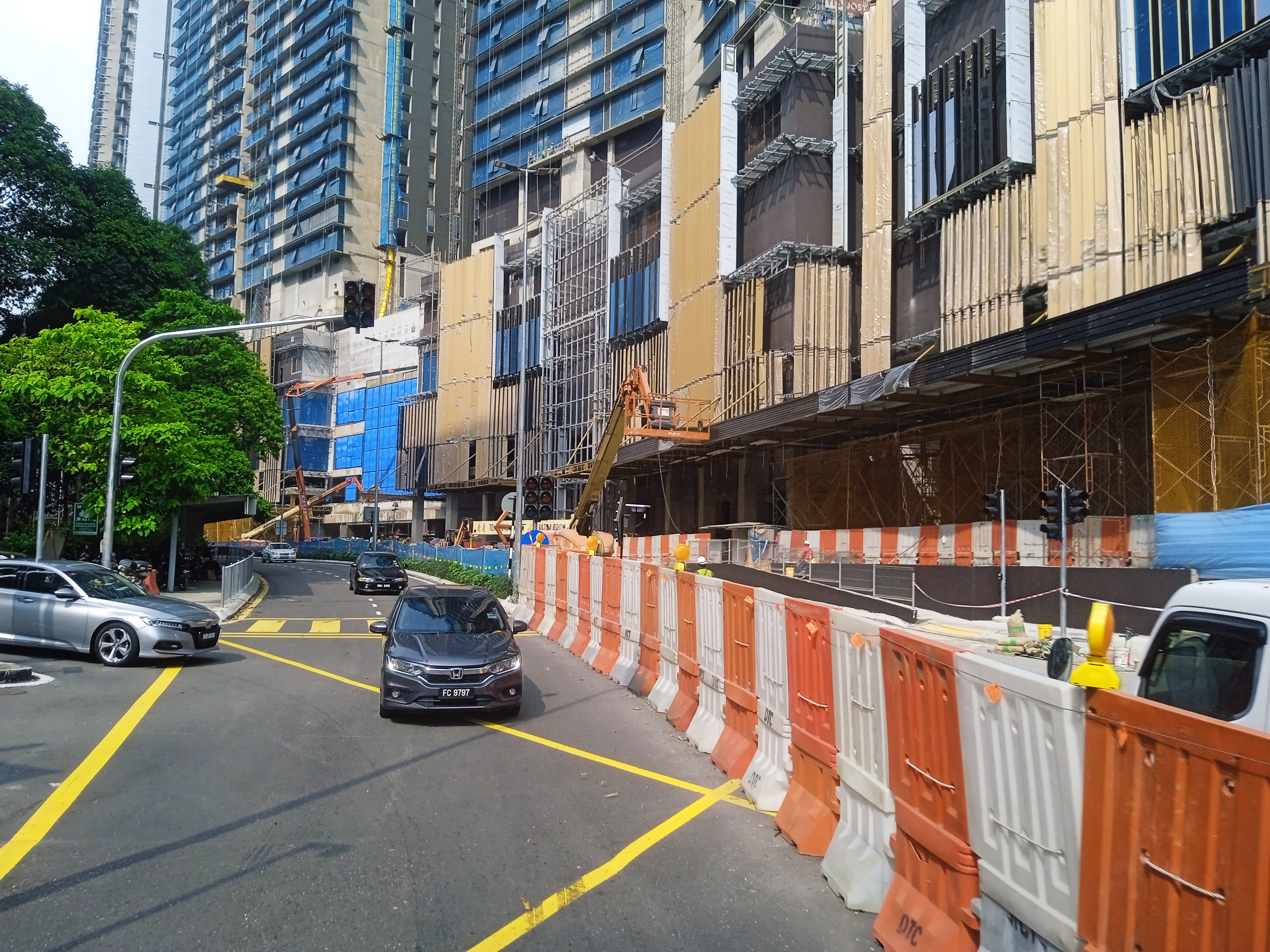
Construction of Pavilion Damansara Heights in 2022.

The mall's main entrance from centre court

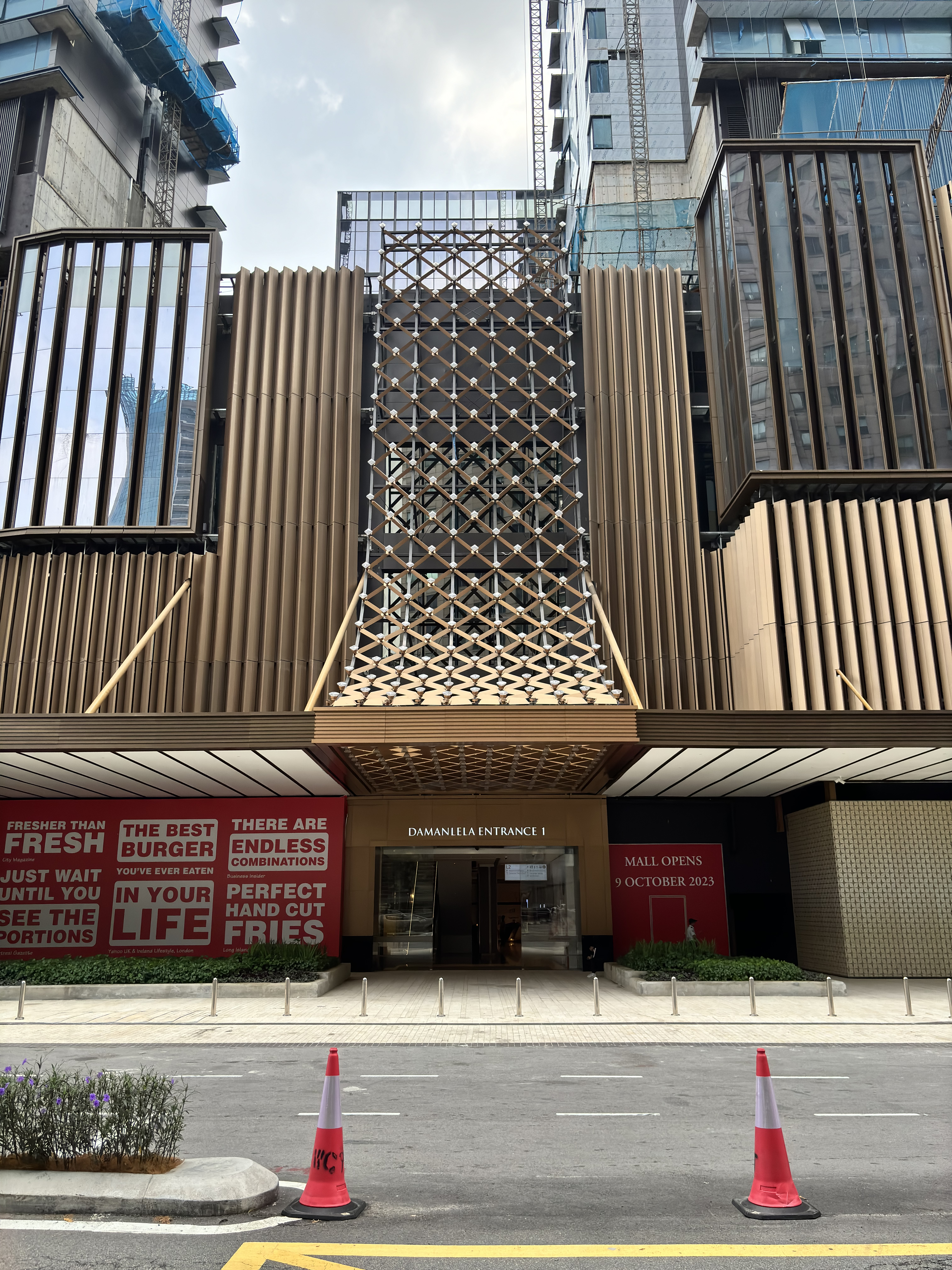
Damanlela Entrance 1 from Jalan Damanlela

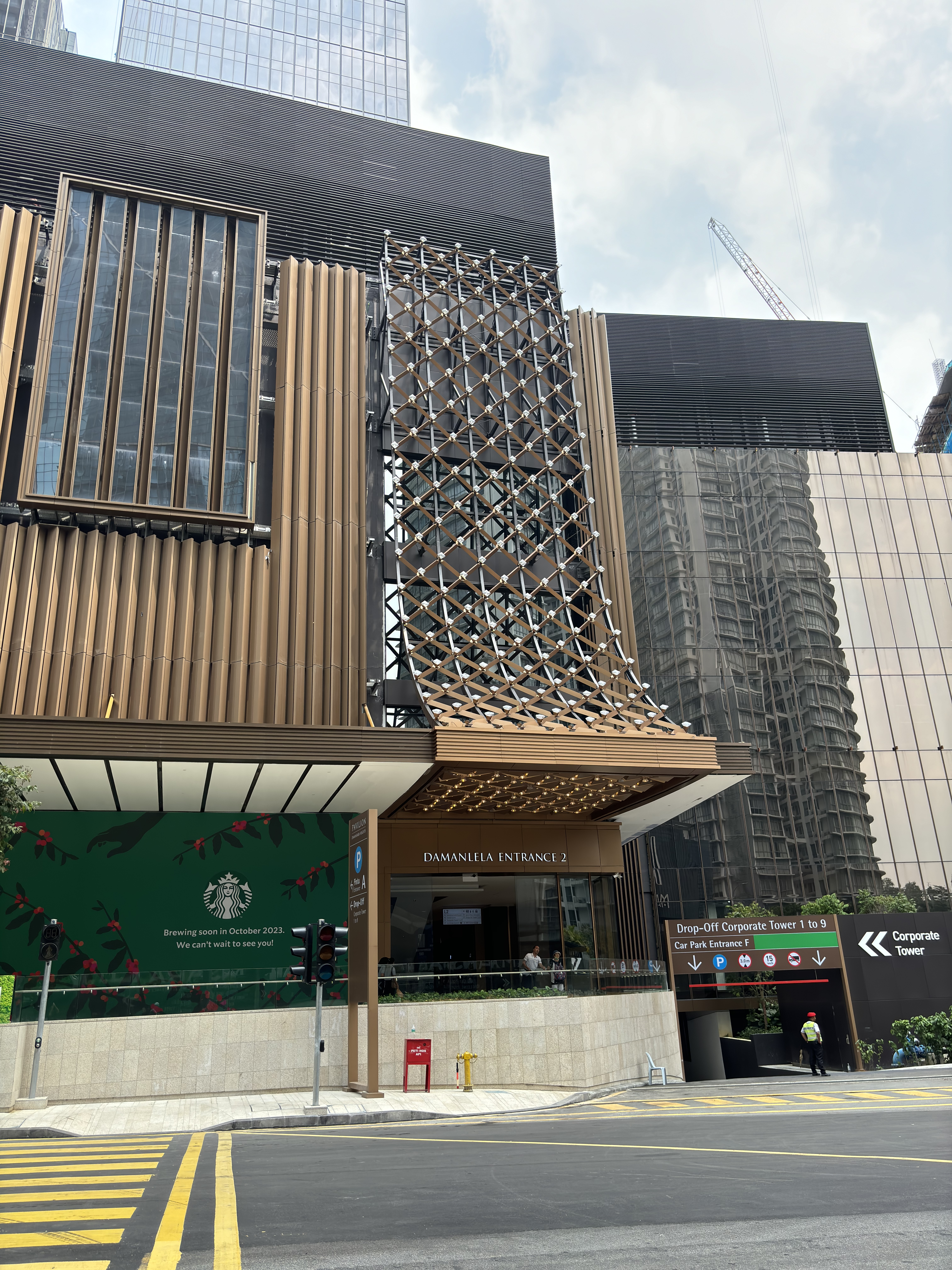
Damanlela Entrance 2 from Jalan Damanlela

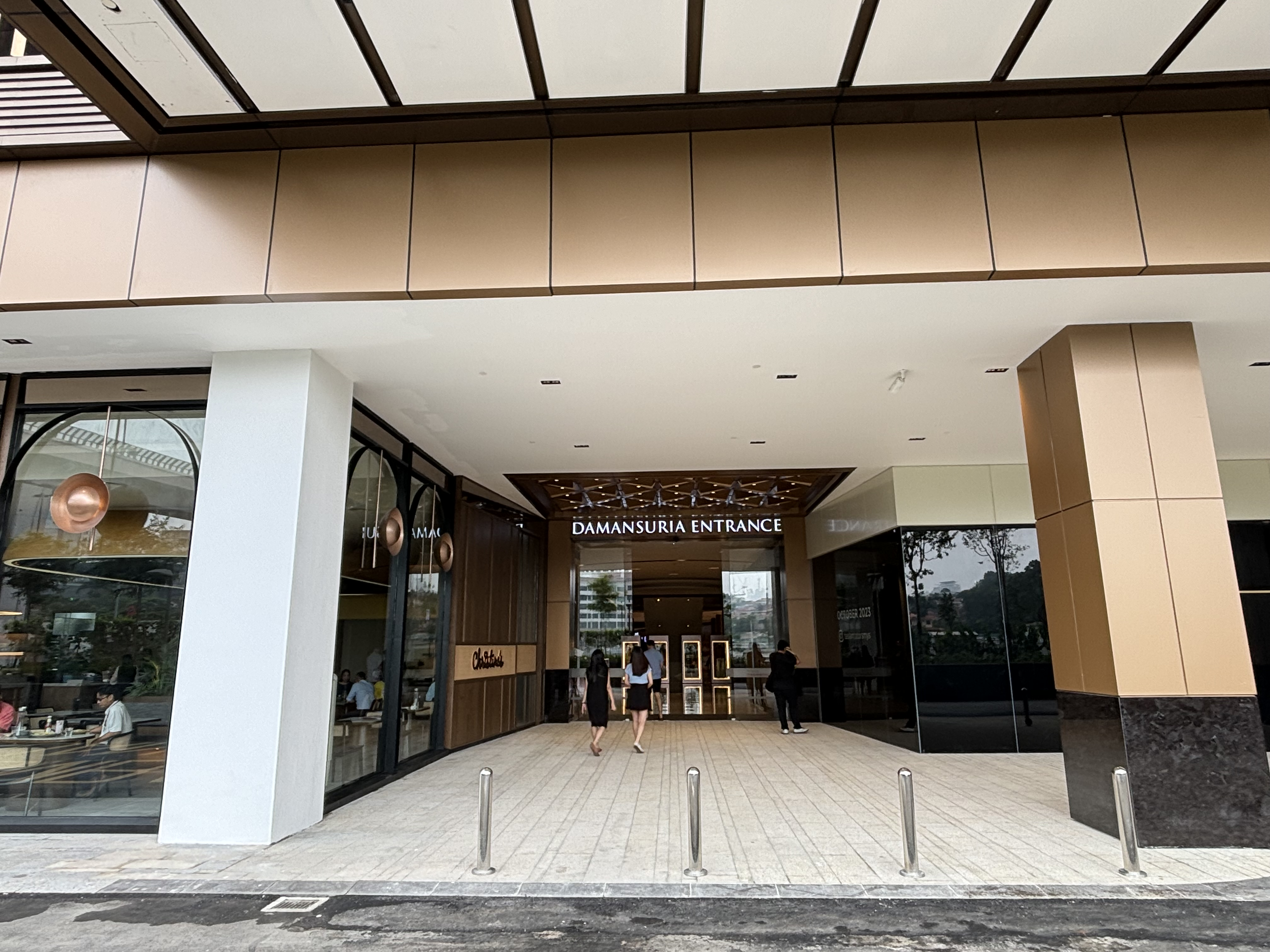
Damansuria Entrance from Jalan Damansuria

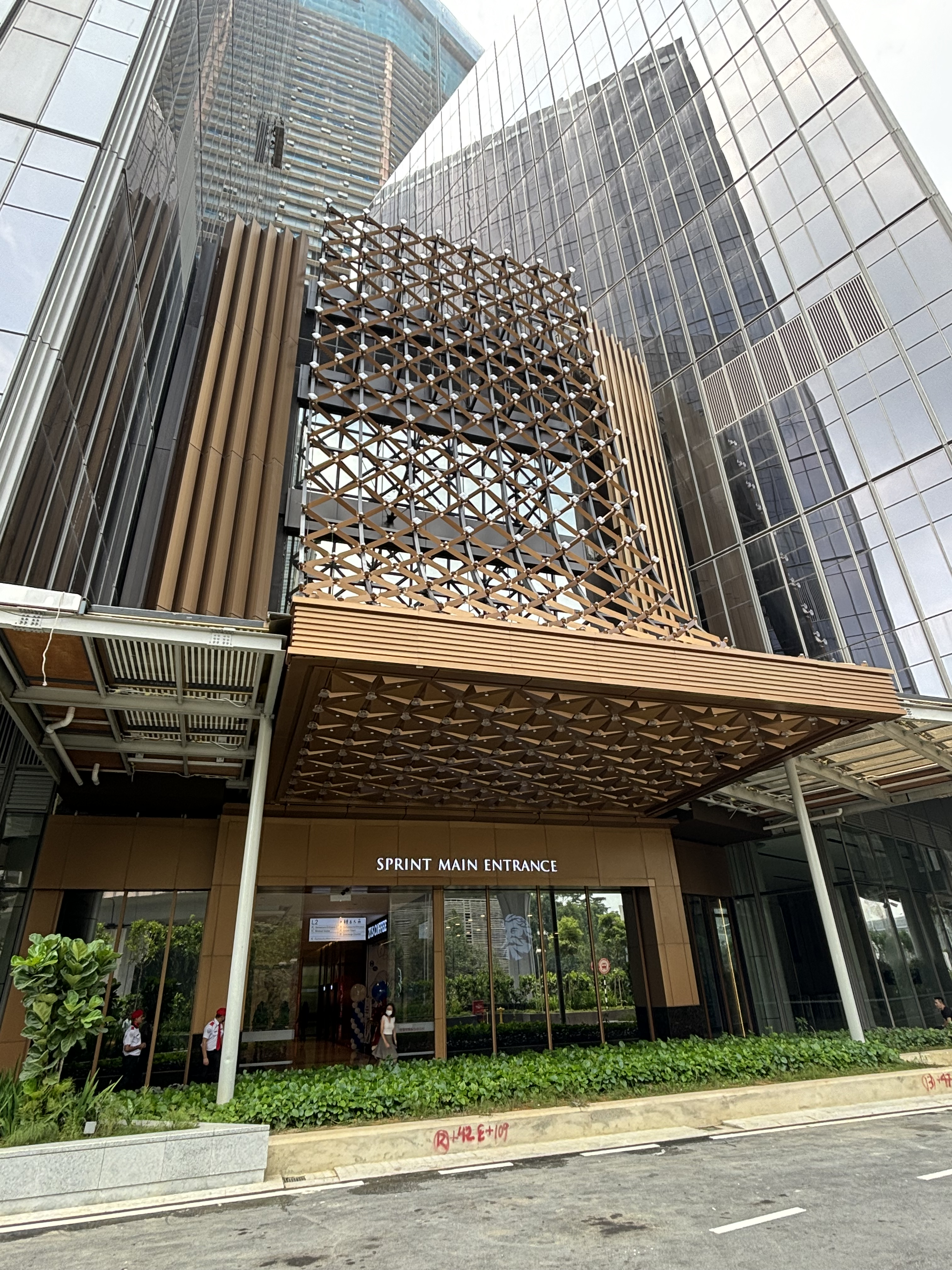
The Sprint main entrance

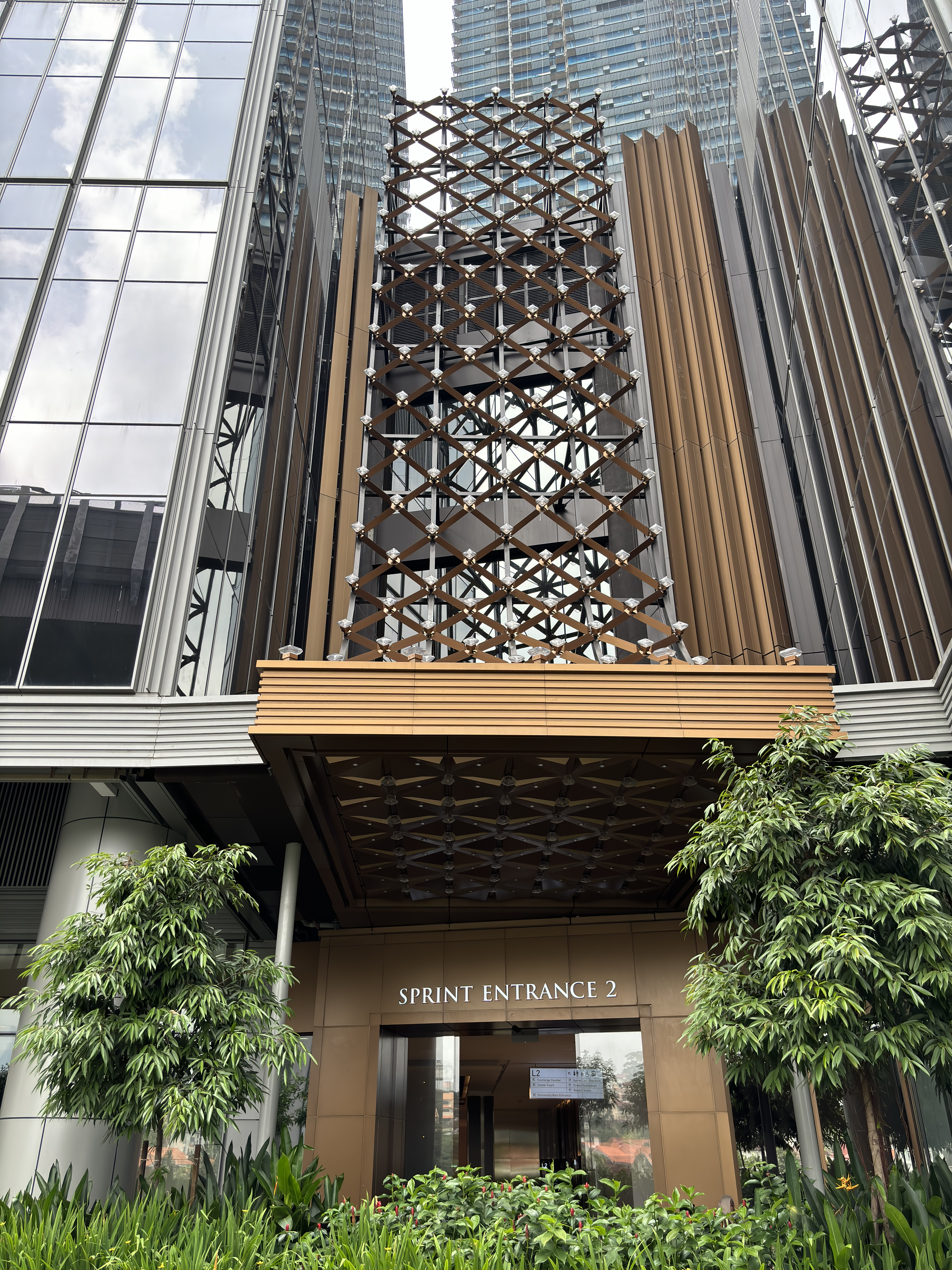
Sprint Entrance 2

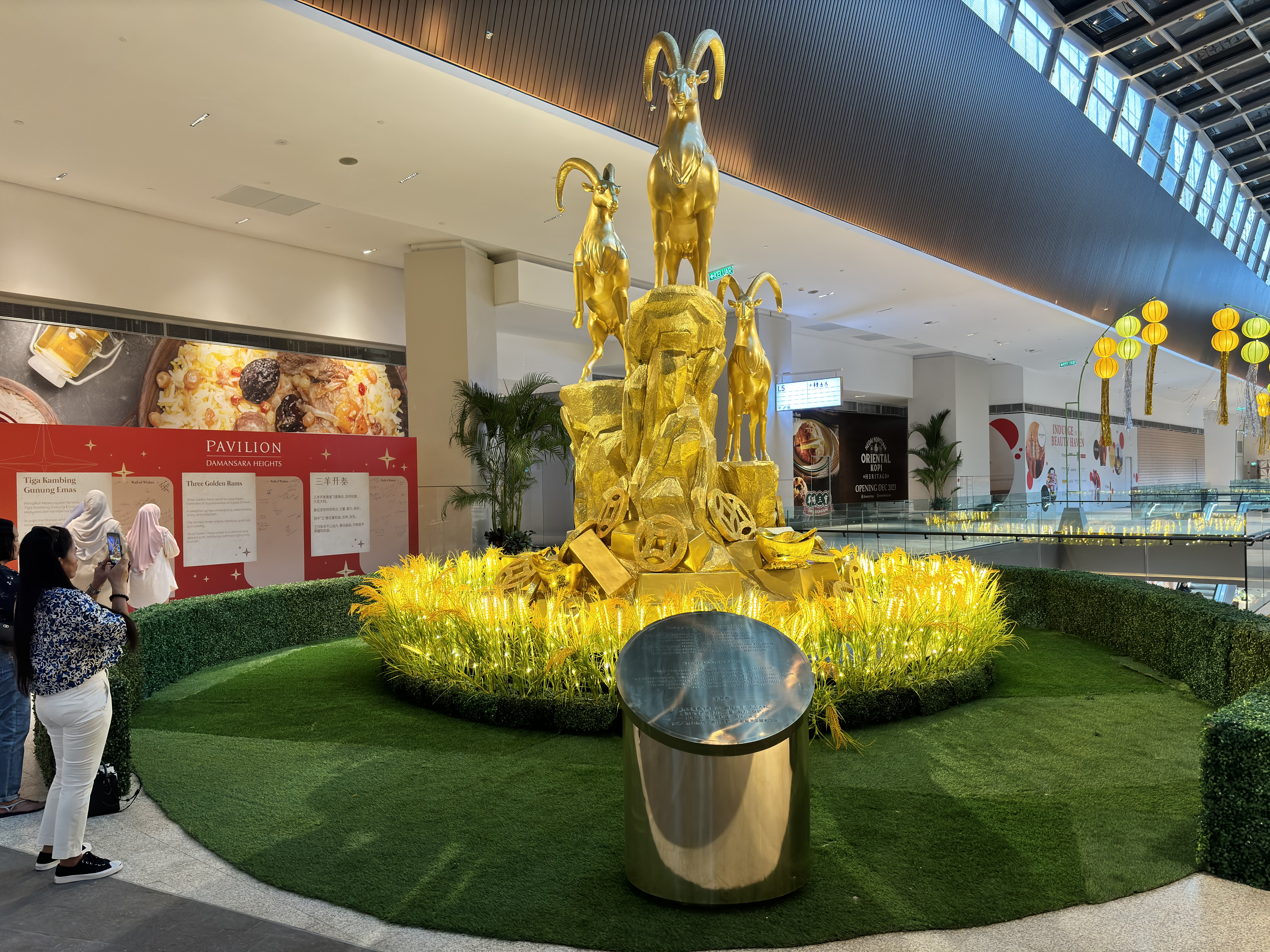
Three Golden Rams statue

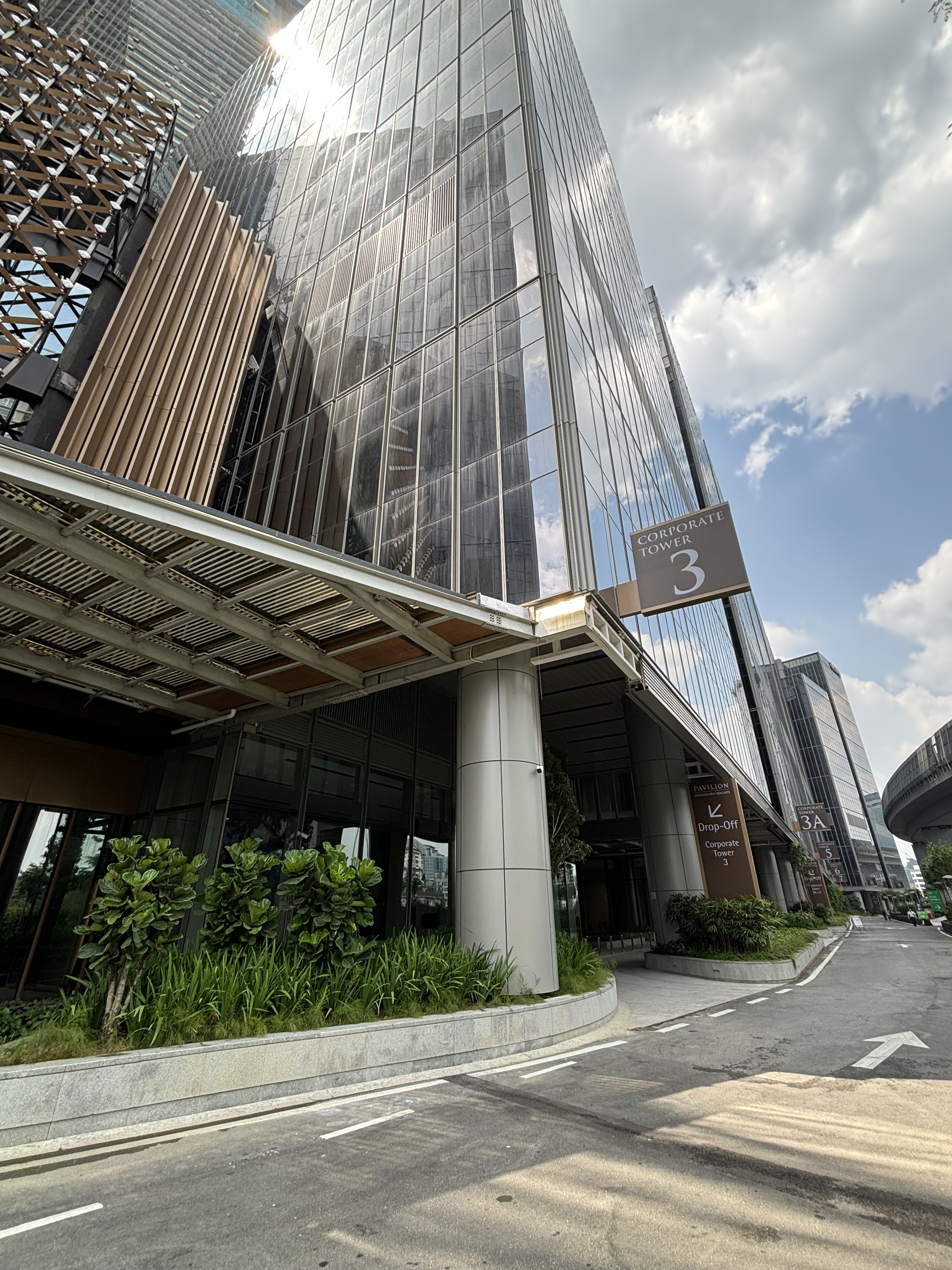
View of the corporate towers

A temporary walkway to Pavilion Damansara Heights from the MRT station

== See also ==
- List of shopping malls in Malaysia
- Pavilion KL
- Pavilion Bukit Jalil
