= Damansara Heights =

Neighbourhood in Kuala Lumpur, Malaysia

Damansara Heights Bukit Damansara
- Neighbourhood
- Damansara Heights skyline in 2024

- Location within Kuala Lumpur
- Coordinates: 03°09′15.69″N 101°39′30.93″E
- Country: Malaysia
- Federal Territory: Kuala Lumpur
- Federal constituency: Segambut
- Time zone: UTC+8 (MST)

Damansara Heights (Malay: Bukit Damansara) is an affluent residential and commercial suburb in western Kuala Lumpur, Malaysia, located approximately 5 km (3.1 mi) west of the city centre. It forms part of the Segambut parliamentary constituency.

== History ==
The initial development of Damansara Heights began in 1971 as a dedicated housing scheme for civil servants on 603.66 acres (244.29 ha) of acquired land comprising landed plots, flats, and shophouses.

The neighbourhood's primary commercial anchor was established with the construction of Wisma Damansara, a 16-storey office building completed by Selangor Properties in 1970, which was the first commercial office building in the suburb.

Wisma Damansara

=== Wisma Damansara redevelopment ===
Wisma Damansara subsequently became vacant and, in October 2024, Selangor Properties sold the 7.98 acres (3.23 ha) site along Jalan Semantan to BRDB Developments Sdn Bhd. In March 2025, BRDB appointed British architectural firm Heatherwick Studio to design a mixed-use development consisting of residential, retail, and community spaces under the working title Damansara Land. The proposed redevelopment density drew objections from neighbouring residents, and Kuala Lumpur City Hall (DBKL) stated in October 2025 that the proposal remained subject to technical reviews.

== Commercial hubs and developments ==
Pavilion Damansara Heights entrance along Jalan Damanlela

Commercial activity in Damansara Heights is concentrated around Jalan Batai, Plaza Damansara, Jalan Dungun, and Jalan Damanlela.

The suburb contains two major integrated retail developments:

- Damansara City Mall (DC Mall): The lifestyle retail anchor of GuocoLand Malaysia's Damansara City development, situated adjacent to office towers and the Sofitel Kuala Lumpur Damansara.
- Pavilion Damansara Heights: A 16 acres (6.5 ha) mixed-use development comprising corporate towers, serviced residences, and a multi-level shopping centre. Phase 1 of the mall opened on 9 October 2023. The development's corporate office towers include the Malaysian headquarters of the China Communications Construction Company (CCCC).

Earlier government administrative offices in the area included the former headquarters of the Department of Civil Aviation Malaysia at Wisma Semantan.

== Education ==
Educational institutions in Damansara Heights include:

- Cempaka International School: A private co-educational school on Jalan Setiabakti Satu.
- Perdana University: Located at Wisma Chase Perdana on Changkat Semantan.
- Sekolah Kebangsaan Bukit Damansara: A national primary school located along Jalan Beringin.
- HELP University Damansara Heights Campus: Located at Wisma CL on Jalan Sri Semantan 1.

== Transportation ==
Platform of Semantan MRT station

=== Rail ===
The suburb is served by two elevated stations on the 9 Kajang Line:

- Pusat Bandar Damansara: Situated over the Sprint Expressway, with a direct pedestrian connection to Pavilion Damansara Heights.
- Semantan: Located along Jalan Semantan, serving corporate offices and academic institutions in the eastern portion of the neighbourhood.

=== Roads ===
The Sprint Expressway (Damansara Link) bisects Damansara Heights and provides east–west connectivity between Kuala Lumpur and Petaling Jaya. Other major arterial routes include Jalan Semantan, Jalan Maarof, Jalan Damansara, and Jalan Tuanku Abdul Halim.

== Gallery ==
Pavilion Damansara Heights exterior

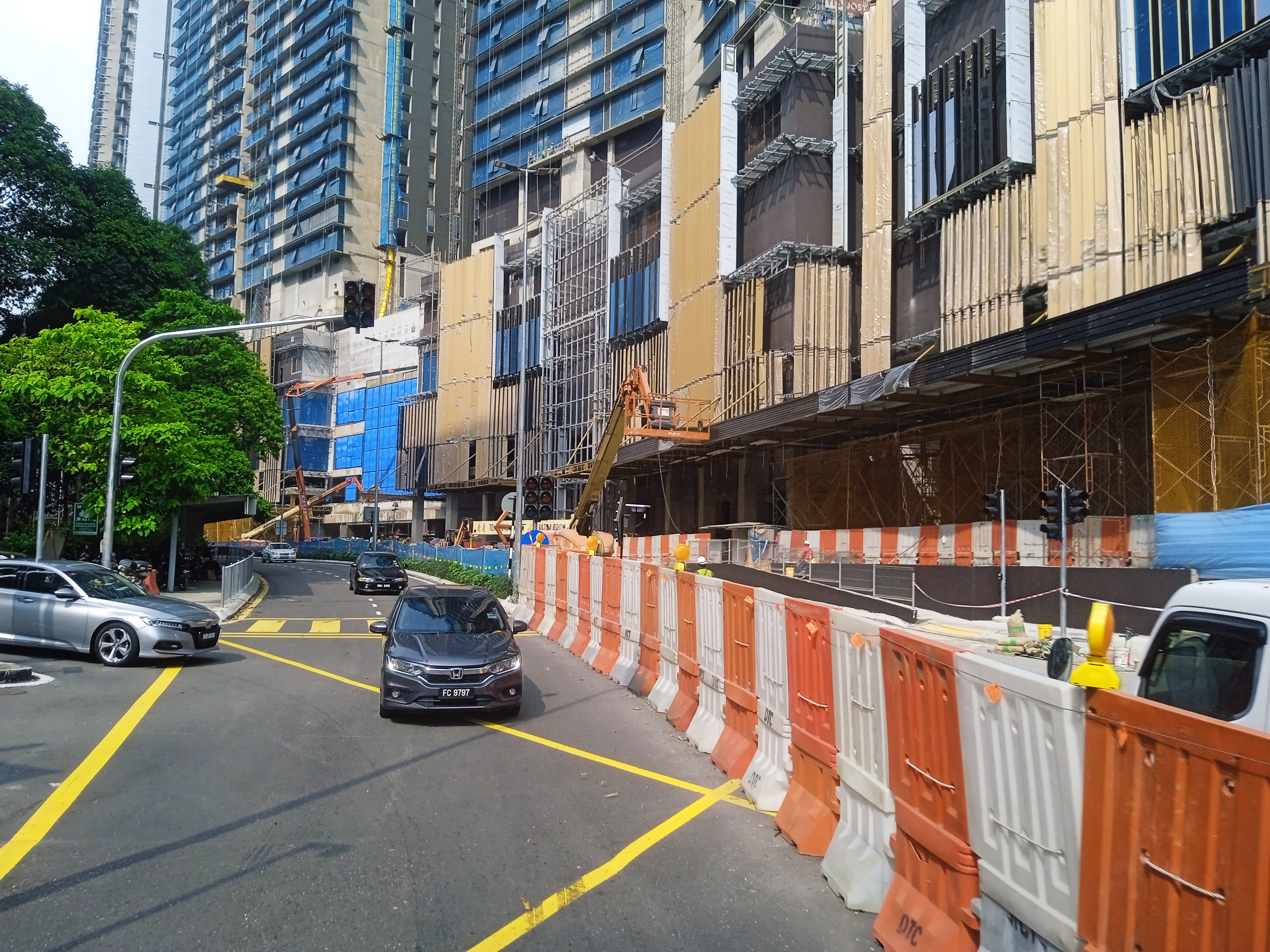
Jalan Damanlela road corridor

Sprint Expressway through Damansara Heights

== See also ==
- Bukit Kiara
- Sri Hartamas
- Bangsar
- Mont Kiara
