= Bukit Kiara =

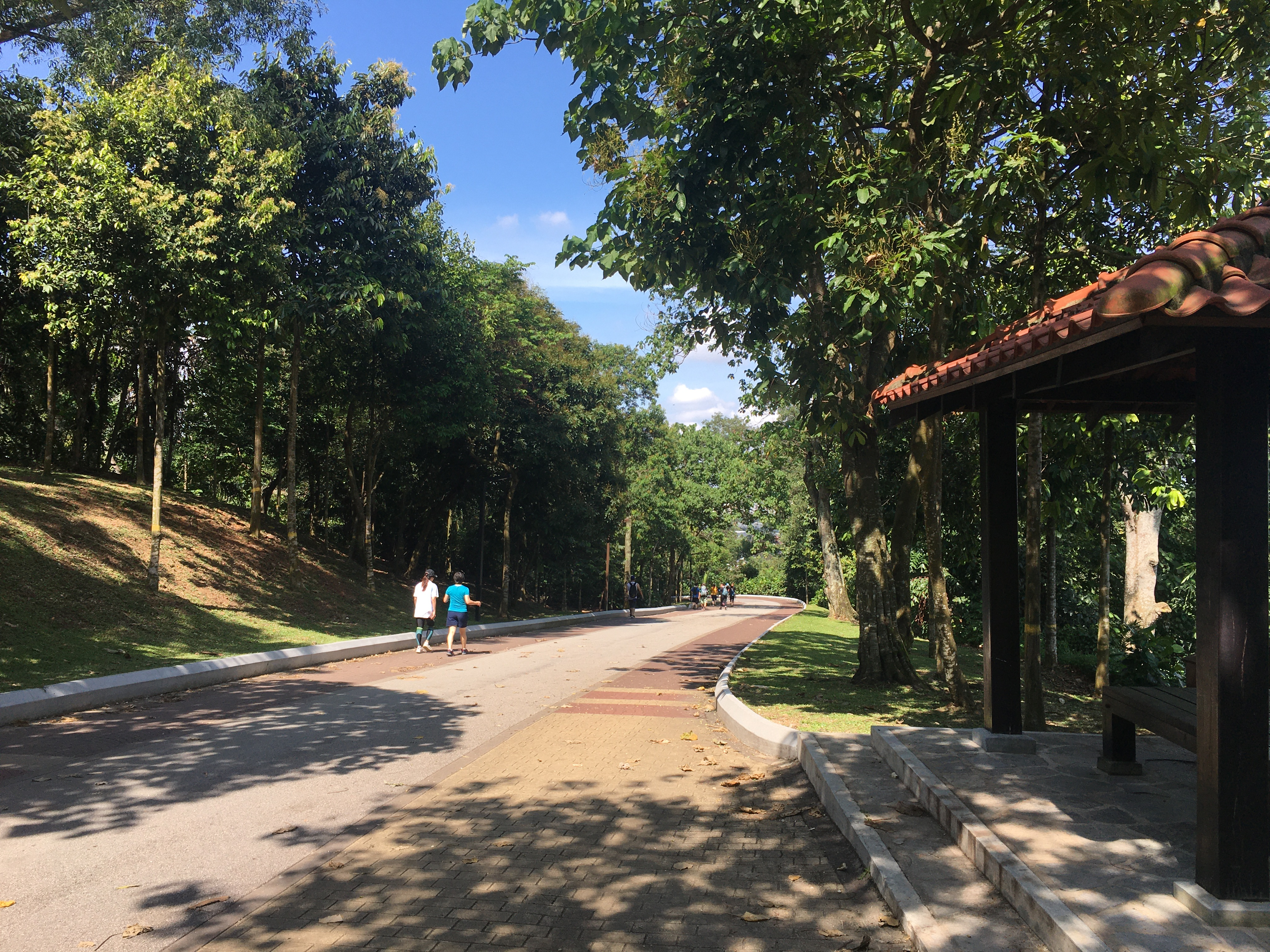
- Bukit Kiara in 2021
- Interactive map of Bukit Kiara
- Location within Malaysia
- Coordinates: 3°8′5″N 101°38′28″E
- Country: Malaysia
- Federal territory: Kuala Lumpur
- Constituency: Segambut

Government
  - Local Authority: Dewan Bandaraya Kuala Lumpur
  - Mayor: Mhd Amin Nordin Abdul Aziz
- Time zone: UTC+8 (MST)
- Postcode: 50480 and 60000
- Dialling code: +60 32
- Police: Brickfields, Dang Wangi
- Fire: Sri Hartamas

Bukit Kiara is a densely forested area of Kuala Lumpur, Malaysia. The area is in proximity to the suburbs of Bukit Damansara, TTDI, Mont Kiara, Sri Hartamas, and Bangsar. Bukit Kiara has often been described as one of the last remaining 'green lungs' of Kuala Lumpur, boasting many jungle trails, pristine rivers and streams and abundant native wildlife. Despite rapid housing and commercial development in neighbouring Mont Kiara, Bukit Kiara is still known as a natural oasis away from the hustle and bustle of Kuala Lumpur.

Ongoing developments on several tracts of land in Bukit Kiara have met with protests from several non-governmental organisations (NGOs), citing the ongoing commitment from various government departments and ministers to have the park gazetted. The gazettement would ensure the remaining park would be protected from development for the foreseeable future.

== History ==
In 1976, the government acquired the then 1,534-acre Bukit Kiara rubber estate from Ng Chin Siu & Sons Rubber Estates Ltd and other minority land owners for RM49.14 million.

Subsequently, some 200 acres were marked as public institutional land to house the National Institute of Public Administration (Intan), National Science Centre and the Securities Commission, among others.

Minutes of government meetings obtained from the National Archives reveal the government later commissioned the services of US Landscape architects and planners Royston Hanamoto, Alley and Abey to lead a local team of professional firms and eminent individuals to prepare a 'botanical garden' master plan for the remaining 1,300 acres.

The master plan, completed in 1982, provided for the creation of an arboretum in the north merging southwards into a park-like National Mausoleum and an international-standard 'public' golf course bordering Jalan Damansara (now Kelab Golf Perkhidmatan Awam).

While the plan remained intact until 1987, along the way, the development of private sector recreation clubs and high-end residential and mixed development projects violated the purpose of the government's acquisition in 1976.

== Recreation ==
Of the original 1,534 acre estate, only about 400 acres is left for public use. The rest has been sold off or acquired over the years by the likes of KL Golf and Country Club (KLGCC), Bukit Kiara Equestrian and Country Resort and various "mixed residential" projects all approved under suspect circumstances.

In 2012, the National Landscape Department erected a 4m fence around one of the lots to demarcate the park and separate it from Berjaya Corporation's Bukit Kiara Equestrian Club. This followed a High Court ruling declaring City Hall had entered into a lease agreement with the club over 62.57 acres (meant to be part of the large scale public park declared in 2007). However, the Housing and Local Government Ministry said the fencing was to deter illegal rubber tapping and to expedite the transformation of the park into a world-class arboretum.

In 2013, the ministry said the large scale public park would comprise four parcels (of which the first lot is an amalgamation of three parcels). The government had then said it was still sorting out matters related to the two lots leased to Measat.

Since 2013, then Segambut MP Lim Lip Eng raised a list of questions in Parliament regarding the delay of the gazettement. The replies given included gazettement could only be made once the Federal Lands and Mines Department had received all land titles from the Commissioner of Land.

"Inside the fence" there is a small network of tarmac trails painted red and yellow and with poorly designed gutters that funnel the heavy rains into the middle of the road instead of into the drains.

Off the tarmac in many directions are numerous mountain bike and walking trails that are maintained by dozens of local volunteers.
