= Cempaka Schools =

Cempaka Schools Malaysia

Location
- Damansara Heights, Kuala Lumpur
- 3°9′4.72″N 101°39′23.76″E

Information
- Type: Private International School; Private National school
- Mottoes: Nurturing children to make a difference; Nothing is impossible
- Established: 1983
- Founder: Dato' Freida Pilus
- Years offered: Early childhood education; Primary school; Secondary school; A-Level
- Gender: Co-educational
- Language: English
- Campuses: Cempaka International School, Bukit Damansara, Kuala Lumpur; Cempaka National School, Cheras, Kuala Lumpur
- Houses: Beruang; Harimau; Helang; Seladang
- Website: www.cempaka.edu.my

Cempaka International School is an international school located in the suburb of Damansara Heights within the Malaysian capital city of Kuala Lumpur. It offers Early Years Education, Primary, Secondary and Pre-university programmes, from children aged 2 to 18. It is the only school in Malaysia offering the Finnish Curriculum, which leads to the UK-based IGCSE and A-Level qualifications.

== History ==
Cempaka School was established in 1983 in a rented bungalow on Jalan Bukit Bintang in Kuala Lumpur, Malaysia. The founder and mentor, Dato' Freida Pilus, started it to provide the best possible education for her sons. Over the years, the school has grown and now comprises two main campuses situated in Bukit Damansara, Kuala Lumpur, and Taman Cheras Permata, Cheras.

== Academic information ==
=== Early Childhood Education ===
"Michelia" is the Early Childhood Education centre in Cempaka schools. It is located inside Cempaka International School's campus in Damansara Heights, Kuala Lumpur.

Divided into "Michelia Buds" for children aged between 18 months and 3 years old and "Michelia Reception" for children aged between 3 and 5 years old, the Early Childhood Education centre uses an inspired Reggio Emilia approach.

=== Primary School Education ===
Cempaka International School Damansara Heights offers the British International Curriculum.

=== Secondary School Education ===
Cempaka International School Damansara Heights primarily offers the Cambridge IGCSE Curriculum for all secondary students from Year 7 to Year 11 (Freshman to Junior 2). Computer Science and Business have chosen to take the Oxford AQA curriculum and examinations, while GCSE Physical Education is using Edexcel Pearson.

• Accounting

• Additional Mathematics

• Art and Design

• Biology

• Business

• Chemistry

• Computer Science

• Economics

• English as a Second Language

• First Language English

• French as a Foreign Language

• Global Perspectives

• Literature in English

• Mandarin as a Foreign Language

• Mandarin as a Second Language

• Malay as a Foreign Language

• Mathematics

• Physics

• Physical Education

=== A-Levels ===
Cempaka School offers the following subjects in its A-Levels programme:

• Art and Design

• Biology

• Business

• Chemistry

• Economics

• English Language

• English Literature

• French Language

• Further Mathematics

• Mathematics

• Physics

== Sports, co-curricular activities, and Expeditions ==
=== Sport houses ===
The sport houses play a major role in the school life and students' development. All students, teachers, staff, and management are allocated into one of the four Houses, promoting inclusion and community spirit. Students represent their house in various sports, academic, and performing arts events throughout the year, part of the First House Cup (Secondary) and the Junior First House Cup (Primary).

The sport houses of Cempaka Schools
Beruang	Harimau	Helang	Seladang
Blue and Gold Victory	Eye Of The Tiger	Rumah Helang Gagah Perkasa	Hot To Go!

=== Physical education ===
The sports curriculum includes physical education (individual and team sports, athletics, outdoor activities), swimming, gymnastics, and dance. In addition, students may choose to participate in the co-curricular activities offered during, after school or on the weekends.

=== Co-curricular activities ===
Cempaka offers a wide and extensive range of co-curricular activities during school hours (for primary), after-school (for pre-school, primary and secondary), and on the weekends. Some of the CCA are: Football, Handball, Netball, Badminton, Swimming, Fencing, Table Tennis, Basketball, Gymnastics, Taekwondo, Ultimate Frisbee, Chess, Robotics, Coding, Public Speaking, Competitive debating, and others.

Cempaka School actively participates in ISSAM (International School Sports Association Malaysia) and MSSWPKL Inter-School competitions as well as other national and international tournaments.

=== GCSE Physical Education ===
Pearson Edexcel GCSE Physical Education is an elective subject offered to Year 10 and Year 11 students in Cempaka International School Damansara Heights who are passionate about sports or considering a career in the sports industry. The 2-years course of study is a simplified Sport Science course, adapted for high school students.

=== Expeditions ===
Alongside the single-day field trips, Cempaka offers six different levels of multi-day trips called "Expeditions" both within Malaysia and Internationally. The expeditions are an integral part of the Cempaka Awards Scheme, a programme consisting of eight sections (Community service, School events, Sports, Skills, Academic arena, Society, Expeditions, and Life-saving), designed towards well-rounded development.

==== Primary School Expeditions ====
1. Campori
2. Junior Heritage Camp

==== Secondary School Expeditions ====
1. Bronze Expedition
2. Silver Expedition
3. Gold Expedition
4. Platinum Expedition

== Notable achievements ==
=== Academic ===
In 2021 the school has reported 58% A*s, 79% A*As, 91% A*AB, and 100% passes in IGCSE as well as 80% A*As in A-Level examinations and an average of 41 out of 45 points in the International Baccalaureate.

In the World Education Games, a global online event with a total participation of 5.9 million students, Cempaka Schools Malaysia has 9 world trophies in three categories - literacy, mathematics, and science, both in the individual events and as a school.

=== Sports ===
A record-breaking UIPM Laser-run event was held in 2018 at Cempaka Cheras to mark the school's 35th anniversary. With a total of 636 participants, this is the largest laser-run event in the world.

=== Performing arts ===
Cempaka Performing Arts Company (CPAC) was established in 2000 to manage the performing arts curriculum of Cempaka Schools. Cempaka schools has provided a well-structured curriculums for students by incorporating music, dance and theatre. Students are given opportunity to be involved in recorded performances and to perform on live shows. In 2017, Cempaka was recognized by The Malaysia Book of Records for being the first school to stage an original musical at a professional level for producing Alice's Wonderland by Cempaka Performing Arts Company (est. 2000). CPAC has also won numerous awards from Boh Cameronian Arts Awards.
