= Sri Hartamas =

- Township of Kuala Lumpur
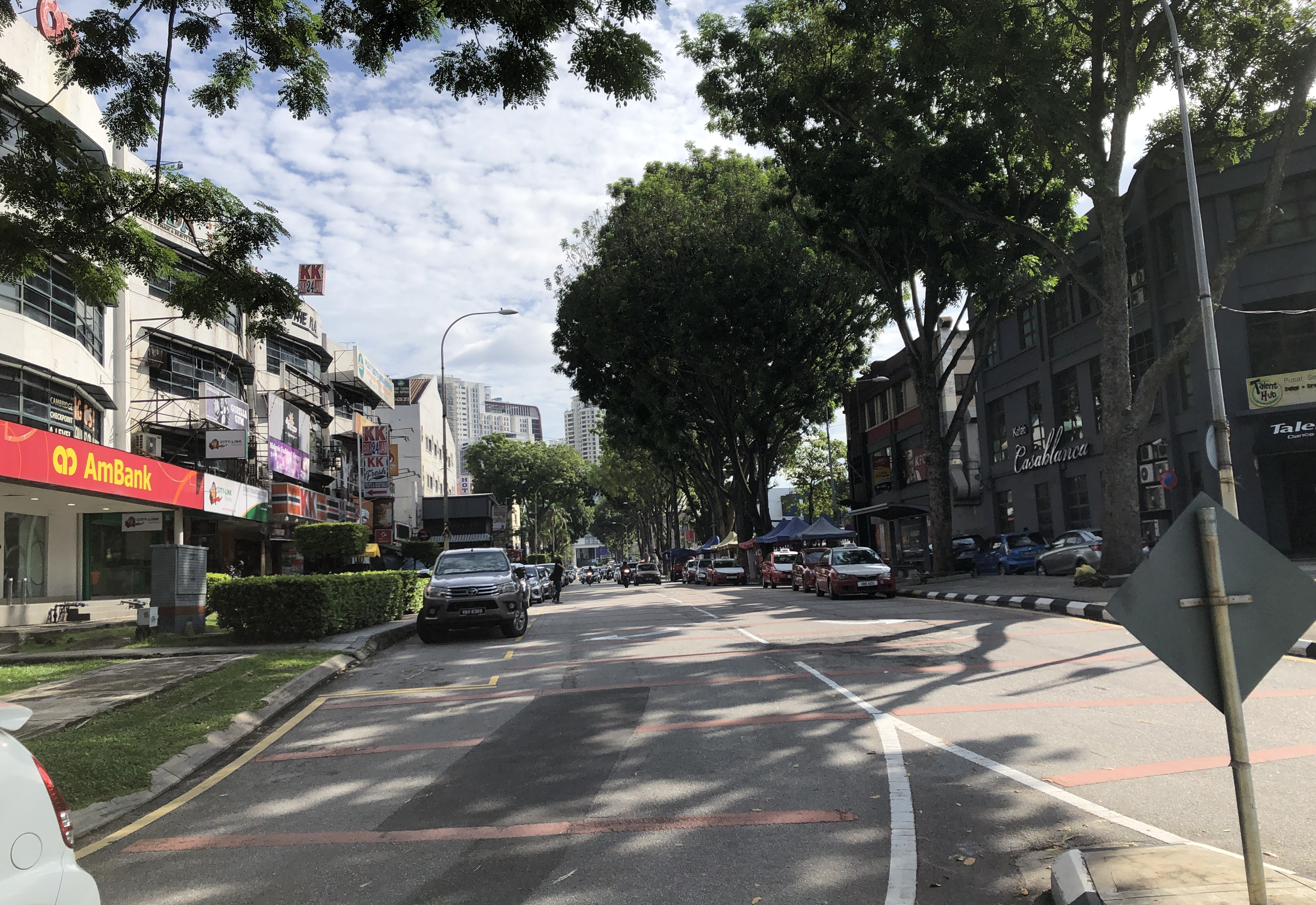
- Commercial area of Desa Sri Hartamas in 2022
- Location of Sri Hartamas in Kuala Lumpur
- Location within Malaysia
- Coordinates: 3.1589°N 101.6509°E
- Country: Malaysia
- State: Federal Territory of Kuala Lumpur
- Constituency: Segambut

Government
  - Local Authority: Dewan Bandaraya Kuala Lumpur
  - Mayor: Mahadi Che Ngah
- Time zone: UTC+8 (MST)
- Postcode: 50480, rarely 51200
- Dialling code: +603-20, +603-62
- Police: Brickfields, Sentul, Dang Wangi
- Fire: Sri Hartamas, Jinjang

Sri Hartamas (Golden Estates in English) is an affluent residential township in the Segambut constituency of the Federal Territory of Kuala Lumpur, Malaysia. The zip and postal code is 50480 or 51200.

== Location, area description and demographic ==
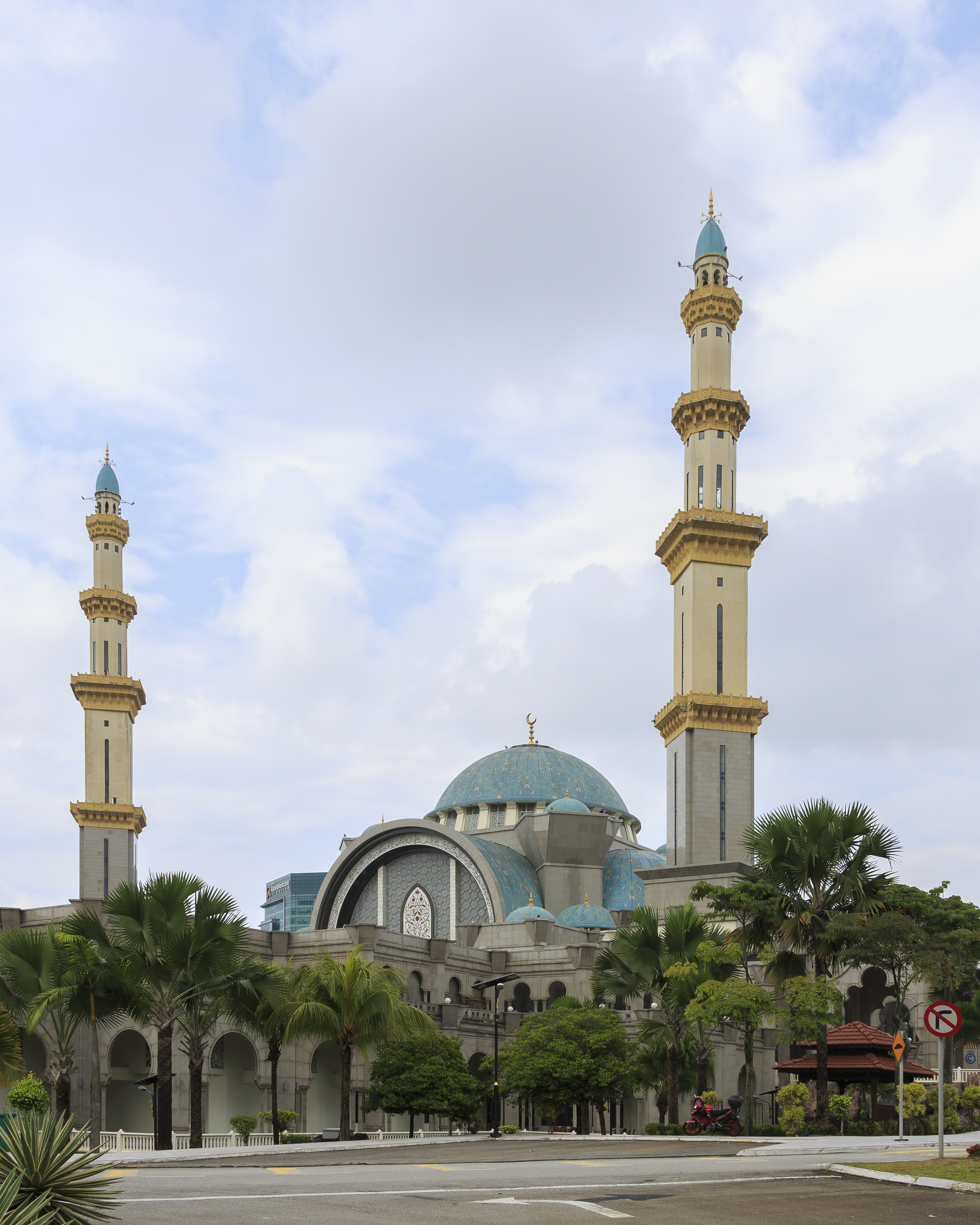
Kuala Lumpur Federal Territory Mosque, close to Sri Hartamas

Sri Hartamas is located right next to Mont Kiara, another affluent township consisting of mainly high-rise apartment buildings and contains a significant expatriate community, as well as Bukit Damansara to the southeast.

Sri Hartamas has a geographical advantage – this township is located very close to the intersection of four major expressways – the NKVE , PLUS, SPRINT and DUKE that link the area with downtown Kuala Lumpur, surrounding suburbs as well as other major towns of Malaysia. The travel time to anywhere in the Klang Valley area, as a result is relatively short, even during rush hour.

Residents of the neighbourhood participate in the resident's association. In years past, the association has hired a private security firm to patrol the area. The relative isolation of Sri Hartamas and the surrounding area made it prey to crime for a while, though this is not so prevalent today. It is next to the new Immigration Department on one side and the old tax offices on the other, so there can be delays during rush hour. A large mosque is also nearby and this does give rise to a large volumes of traffic, particularly on Friday lunchtimes.

The homes in Sri Hartamas consists of low rise condominium, retail and shopping blocks, townhouses, adjoining semi detached homes and small town bungalows. Built by a Malaysian developer in the 80s, the streets are wide, compared to other areas. The wide streets turned out to a boon for multi car households that live in the area with limited garage space when the neighbourhood went through a renaissance period.

== History ==
=== 1990s Renaissance ===
Sri Hartamas gained considerable popularity as a desired neighbourhood during the Asian boom of the mid 1990s. Prior to that, the belief by Malaysians was that the neighbourhood was too isolated (it was located halfway between Kepong and downtown KL), with little to no infrastructure in the area. With no grocer in the neighbourhood at the time, a pint of milk was a 15-minute drive away. As the demand for quality housing in Kuala Lumpur increased, this soon became irrelevant.

Indeed, easy transportation access by virtue of being close to the expressways, proved to be Sri Hartamas's saviour. Other developments in the area followed. Down the street, a huge condominium project, "Mont Kiara", soon took off.

Mont Kiara as well as Sri Hartamas quickly became very popular, not only with the Malaysian young professionals, but also with expatriate families, who hail mostly from Australia, Japan, China, Britain and mainland Europe.

The extra security and the two international private schools in Sri Hartamas that opened at this time made the area a boon for expatriate families. Sri Hartamas, circa 1996–1999 became an international neighbourhood, with residents originating from different countries.

Americans as well as single expatriates on the contrary tended to prefer living in nearby Bangsar, another neighbourhood closer to restaurants, clubs, bars and shopping malls.

=== Changes post-1990s boom ===
The area has made significant progress when it was first planned by Sri Hartamas Development Sdn Bhd to develop the 260-acre township on a rubber plantation. From there, the firm was established under a joint venture with real estate tycoon Tan Sri Chong Kok Lim, Datuk Syed Kechik from Kumpulan Syed Kechik Sdn Bhd and Datuk Wong Kee Tat from Kuala Lumpur Industries Holdings Berhad. The township development ranges from landed properties, terrace houses and semi-detached houses to shoplots.

Another development followed, this time bringing some of the infrastructure that Sri Hartamas initially lacked: restaurants, shops, bars and as well as an outdoor Malaysian style food bazaar. Much of the shops and pricing cater to the relatively affluent and expatriate demographic of the area.

=== Sri Hartamas in the 21st century ===
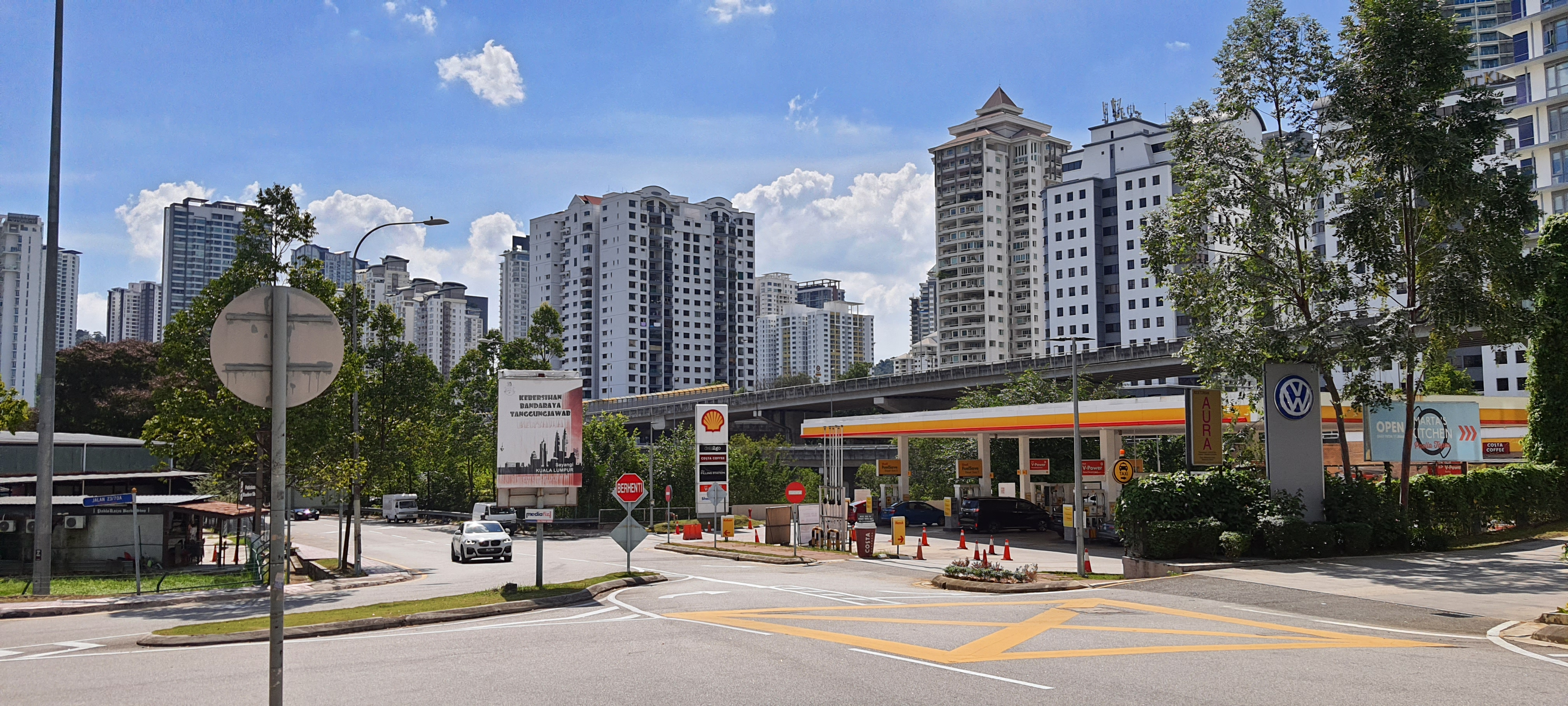
The commercial hub of Desa Sri Hartamas, Kuala Lumpur. The high rise buildings in the background are in neighboring areas of Mont Kiara and Segambut Dalam, separated by Penchala Link of the SPRINT Expressway.

The isolation and greenery of Sri Hartamas, with easy access to anywhere; the trademark of the area, gave away some of its lustre when access to a third expressway opened up in 2004 that links the area with the rest of Kuala Lumpur. The expressway is known as Sprint Expressway whereby it is one of the busiest expressway during rush hour traffic.

Little of the greenery remains and hence Sri Hartamas is not as quiet as it used to be. The traffic influx as well as other new developments nearby has brought an increasing number of people to the area. Through some of its isolation is gone, the young Malaysian professionals that initially moved into the area stayed on.

However, the expatriate community that once lived here in large numbers dwindled after the 1997 Asian financial crisis, when people moved back to their home countries. The area continues to be popular with expatriate families, particularly those with children.

Though no reliable census exists, there is a healthy balance in the number of residents from the different Malaysian ethnic groups in Sri Hartamas, with no obvious majority group, unlike other parts of Malaysia.

The nightlife of Sri Hartamas is now a small but vibrant community, centered around a wide range of restaurants and bars that have developed near the shopping area in Desa Sri Hartamas. While there are some western style expat bars, the area also features food courts and a multitude of Asian-fusion that includes Japanese, Thai, and Malaysian restaurants.

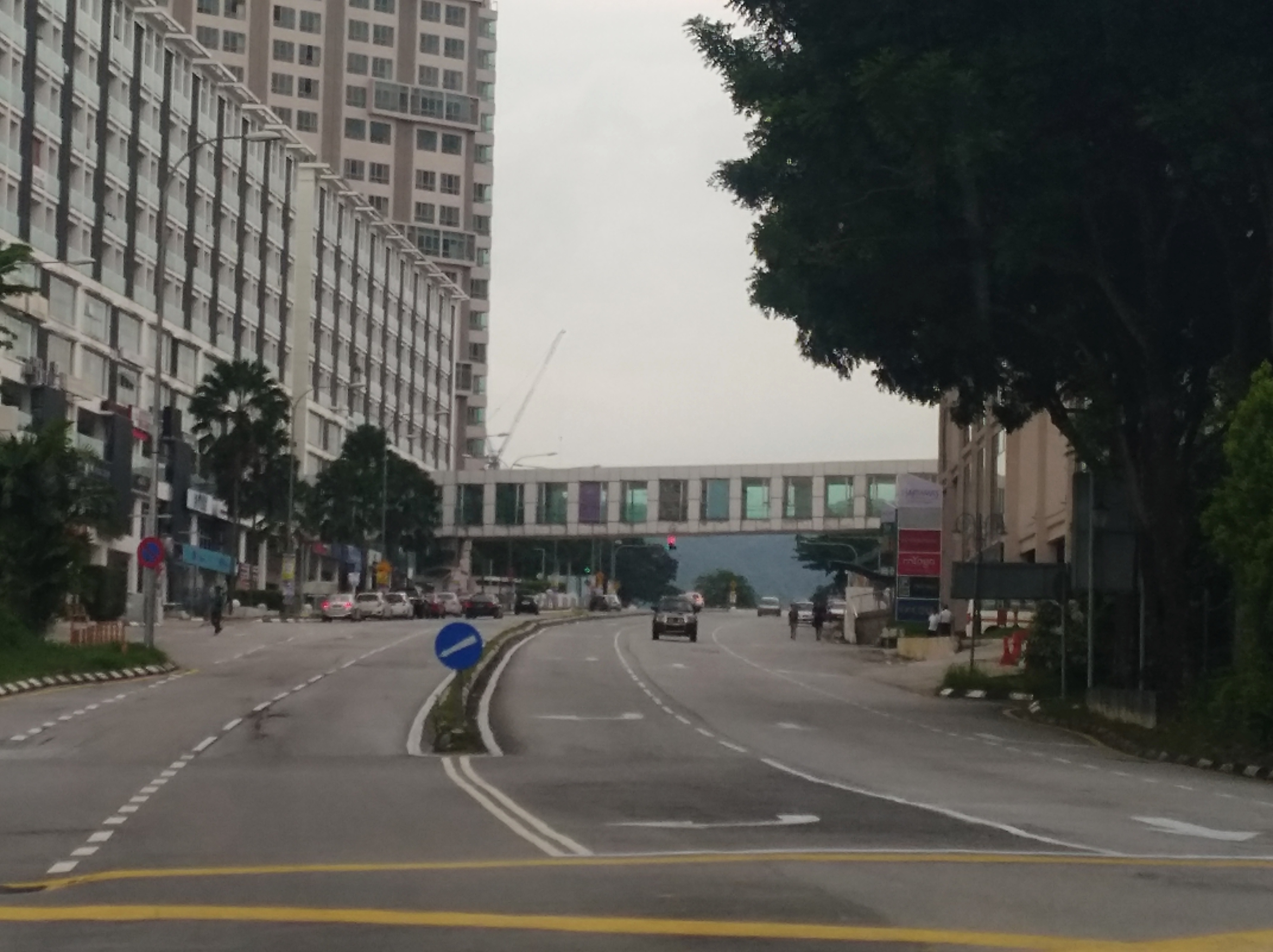
Plaza Damas development by Mayland Group in Sri Hartamas

== Amenities ==
Amenities nearby include: 2 golf courses (KLGCC), a country club, health club and spa. The Hartamas Shopping Centre (housed inside Plaza Damas) is the area's biggest shopping mall.

== Infrastructure and facilities ==
=== Basic infrastructure ===
Sri Hartamas has utility services including wired telephone connections, electricity, broadband internet and waste collection. Before 1995, mobile phone coverage in parts of Sri Hartamas varied by operator. Mobile network operators subsequently installed base stations throughout the neighbourhood. Sri Hartamas is connected to neighbouring residential districts through several major roads, including the Penchala Link, SPRINT Expressway, Duta–Ulu Kelang Expressway and New Klang Valley Expressway.

=== Education ===
Sri Hartamas is home to many government and private schools.

Kindergartens:

- Taska Seri Hartamas (government)
- Smart Reader Kids Desa Seri Hartamas (private)
- Garden International School Early Years Centre (private)

Primary School:

- Sekolah Kebangsaan Seri Hartamas (Seri Hartamas National School)

Secondary School:

- Sekolah Menengah Kebangsaan Seri Hartamas (Seri Hartamas National Secondary School)

Colleges:

- ~~Taylor's College Sri Hartamas Campus~~ ~~(private)~~ (closed since 2018)
- SRI College (private)

== Politics ==
Sri Hartamas is part of the Segambut constituency, currently represented in the Malaysian Parliament by Hannah Yeoh of the DAP since 2018.

== In popular culture ==
Sri Hartamas was featured on the American reality TV series, The Amazing Race Series 11 "All-Stars" in April 2007. As a challenge, the contestants' who flew in from Poland in Leg 9 of the series, were asked to roam the neighbourhood soliciting surat khabar lama (Malay), or "old newspapers" (English) from Sri Hartamas residents for recycling.

== Access ==
=== Public transportation ===
Sri Hartamas is indirectly served by the Segambut KTM Komuter station on the Tanjung Malim–Port Klang Line. RapidKL bus route 190 connects Sri Hartamas and Mont Kiara to the KTM station.

rapidKL buses T818 and T852 connect Sri Hartamas to Semantan MRT station on the Kajang line (SBK Line).

The area is planned to be served by the Sri Hartamas MRT station in the future which is part of the proposed MRT Circle Line.
