= Semantan MRT station =

Railway station in Kuala Lumpur

KG14 Semantan
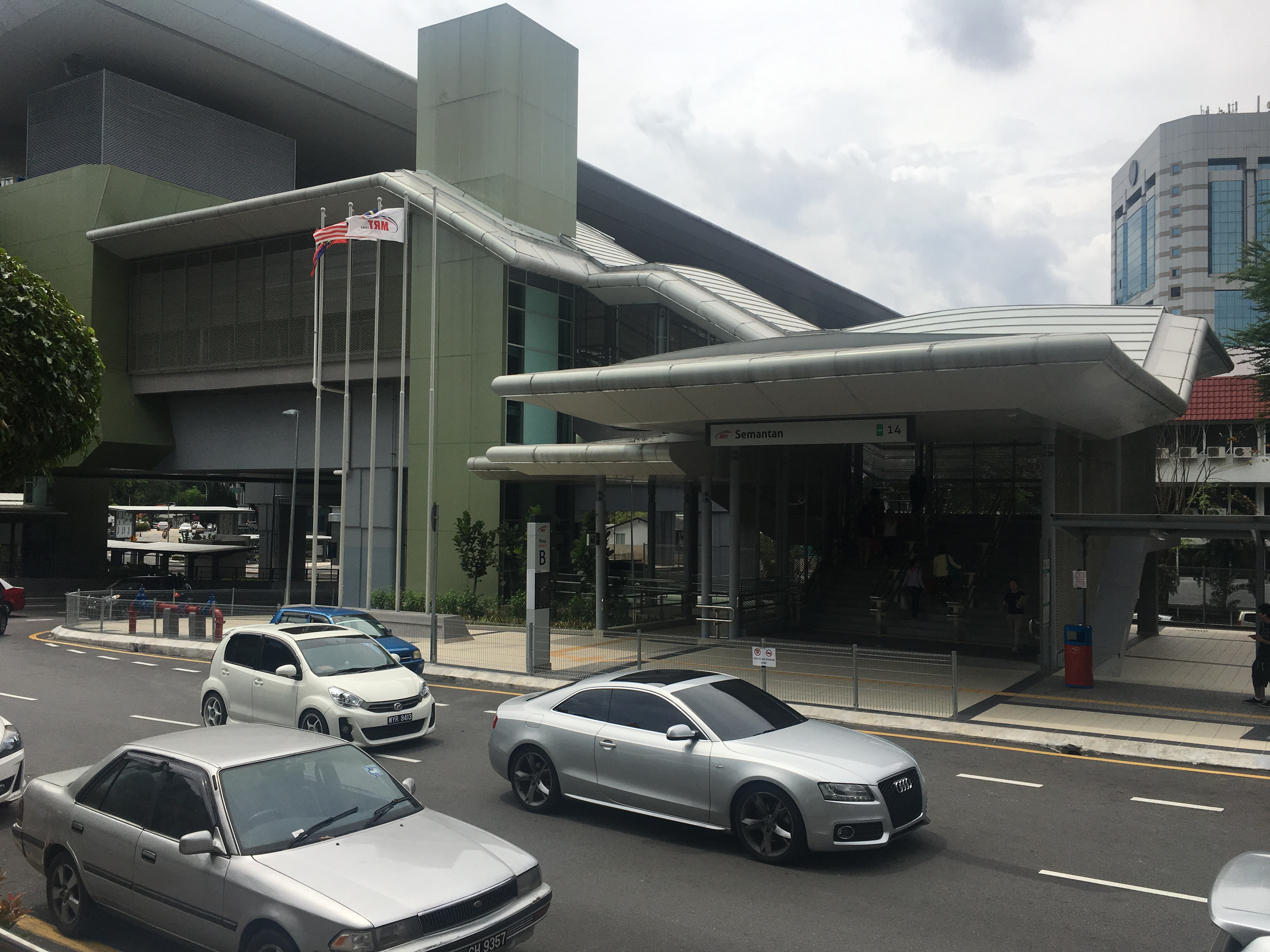
- Entrance B of the station at Jalan Dungun.

General information
- Other names: Malay: سمنتن (Jawi); Chinese: 士曼丹; Tamil: செமாந்தான்
- Location: Jalan Semantan, Damansara Heights; 50490 Kuala Lumpur; Malaysia
- Coordinates: 3°9′4.05″N 101°39′55.75″E
- System: Rapid KL
- Owner: MRT Corp
- Operator: Rapid Rail
- Line: 9 Kajang Line
- Platforms: 2 side platforms
- Tracks: 2

Construction
- Structure type: Elevated
- Parking: Available near the overhead bridge
- Cycle facilities: Available. 30 bicycle bays.
- Accessible: Yes

Other information
- Station code: KG14

History
- Opened: 16 December 2016; 9 years ago
- Former names: Manulife–Semantan (2017–2023)

Services
Preceding station		Following station
Pusat Bandar Damansara towards Kwasa Damansara	Kajang Line	Muzium Negara towards Kajang
Location

The Semantan MRT Station is a mass rapid transit (MRT) station serving the suburb of Damansara Heights, Kuala Lumpur, Malaysia. It is one of the stations on the MRT Kajang Line and was opened on 16 December 2016 when Phase One of the line became operational.

The station is located near the Semantan Interchange (Jalan Dungun intersection) of the Sprint Expressway (Damansara Link) near Wisma UN, the United Nations (UN) representative office in Malaysia and the office area of Jalan Dungun.

== History ==
During Phase One operation of the Kajang Line (then known as the MRT Sungai Buloh-Kajang Line), this station was the southern terminus of the line where all passengers had to disembark. Trains would leave the station and make a turnback at the crossover track above Jalan Sultan Abdul Halim before heading back towards Sungai Buloh. With the opening of Phase Two on 17 July 2017, the southern terminus of the station became Kajang station.

The station was previously known as Manulife-Semantan from 21 August 2017 when Manulife have granted a 5-year contract for the naming rights of the station under the station naming rights programme, which is located within 5 minutes walk from Menara Manulife, the Manulife Malaysia's headquarters. Nonetheless, the station naming rights contract was ended from 1 December 2023.

== Station features ==
=== Station layout ===
L2	Platform Level	Side platform
L2	Platform Level	Platform 1: 9 Kajang Line towards KG35 Kajang (→)
L2	Platform Level	Platform 2: 9 Kajang Line towards KG04 Kwasa Damansara (←)
L2	Platform Level	Side platform
L1	Concourse	Faregates to paid area, escalators to platforms, ticketing machines, customer service office, station control, toilets, 7-Eleven, Rotiboy bakeshoppe, Entrance A and B escalators as well as lifts from ground level.
G	Ground Level	Entrance A and Entrance B, Feeder bus stop, Taxi Lay-by, Car lay-by

=== Exit and entrances ===
The station has two entrances, Entrance A is located on the north side along Jalan Damansara Endah while Entrance B is located on the south side along Jalan Dungun opposite of Wisma UOA Damansara. Both of the entrances have bus stops for bus and feeder services.

Kajang Line station
Entrance	Location	Destination	Picture
A	South side of Jalan Semantan	Jalan Damansara Endah: bus stop for feeder and other bus services, car park	
B	North side of Jalan Semantan	Jalan Dungun: bus stop for feeder and other bus services, Menara Manulife, Wisma UOA Damansara and The Five.	

== Bus services ==
=== MRT Feeder Bus Services ===
With the opening of the Kajang Line, feeder buses also began operating, linking the station with the Solaris Dutamas and Kuala Lumpur High Court areas in Jalan Tuanku Abdul Halim (Jalan Duta). The feeder buses operate from the station's feeder bus stops adjacent to the station at the Jalan Dungun entrance (Entrance B) of the station.

With the closure of Entrance B of the Pusat Bandar Damansara station, bus routes T818, T819, T820 and T852 will operate from this station until further notice.

Route No.	Origin	Destination	Via
T817	KG13 MRT Pusat Bandar Damasara	Mid Valley South Court	Lorong Maarof Jalan Maarof KG14 MRT Semantan (Entrance A)
T821	KG14 Semantan (Entrance B)	Kuala Lumpur High Court, Publika	Jalan Dungun; Jalan Gelenggang; Jalan Semantan; Jalan Tuanku Abdul Halim; Jalan Dutamas 1 Jalan Sultan Haji Ahmad Shah MITEC, MTRADE
T818	Desa Sri Hartamas	KG14 Semantan (Entrance B)	Plaza Damansara
T852	KG14 Semantan (Entrance B)	Mont Kiara	Plaza Damansara Publika

=== Other Bus Services ===
The station is also served by Rapid KL trunk buses at bus stops on either side of Jalan Semantan and accessed via both entrances of the station. Semantan station is also served by a Kelana Jaya Line feeder bus route, connecting it with the Bangsar LRT station. The bus stop for the feeder bus is at Jalan Dungun, accessed via Entrance B.

Route No.	Origin	Desitination	Via
T850	KJ16 Bangsar	Pusat Bandar Damansara; Jalan Dungun	Jalan Bangsar Utama 1 Lorong Maarof; Jalan Maarof; Sprint Highway Plaza Damansara; Jalan Dungun; KG14 Semantan (Entrance B); Jalan Gelenggang; Jalan Damanlela; Jalan Maarof; Jalan Bangsar

== Gallery ==
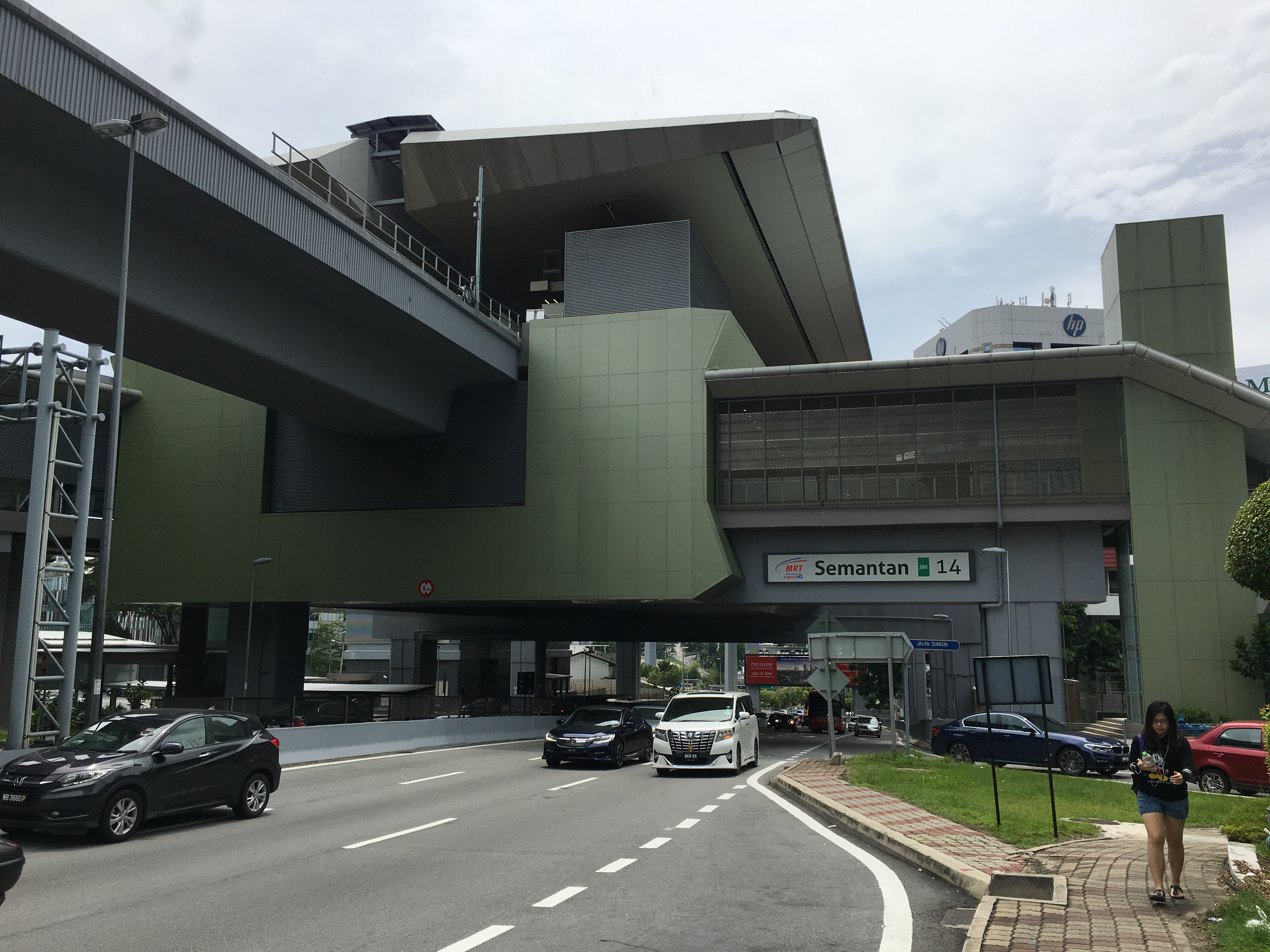
The MRT station above Jalan Semantan/Sprint Expressway

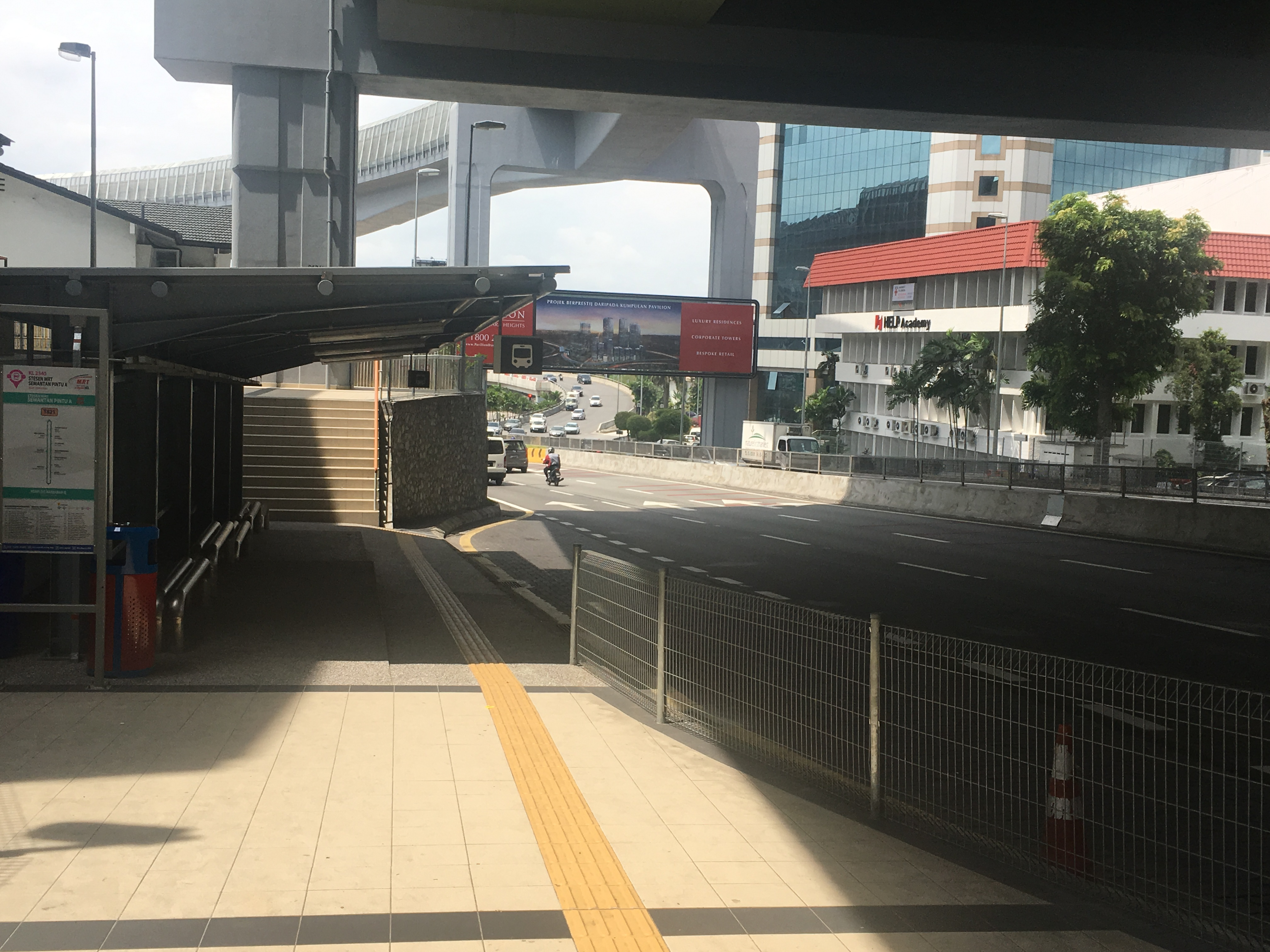
Bus stop along Jalan Semantan/Sprint Expressway accessed via Entrance A

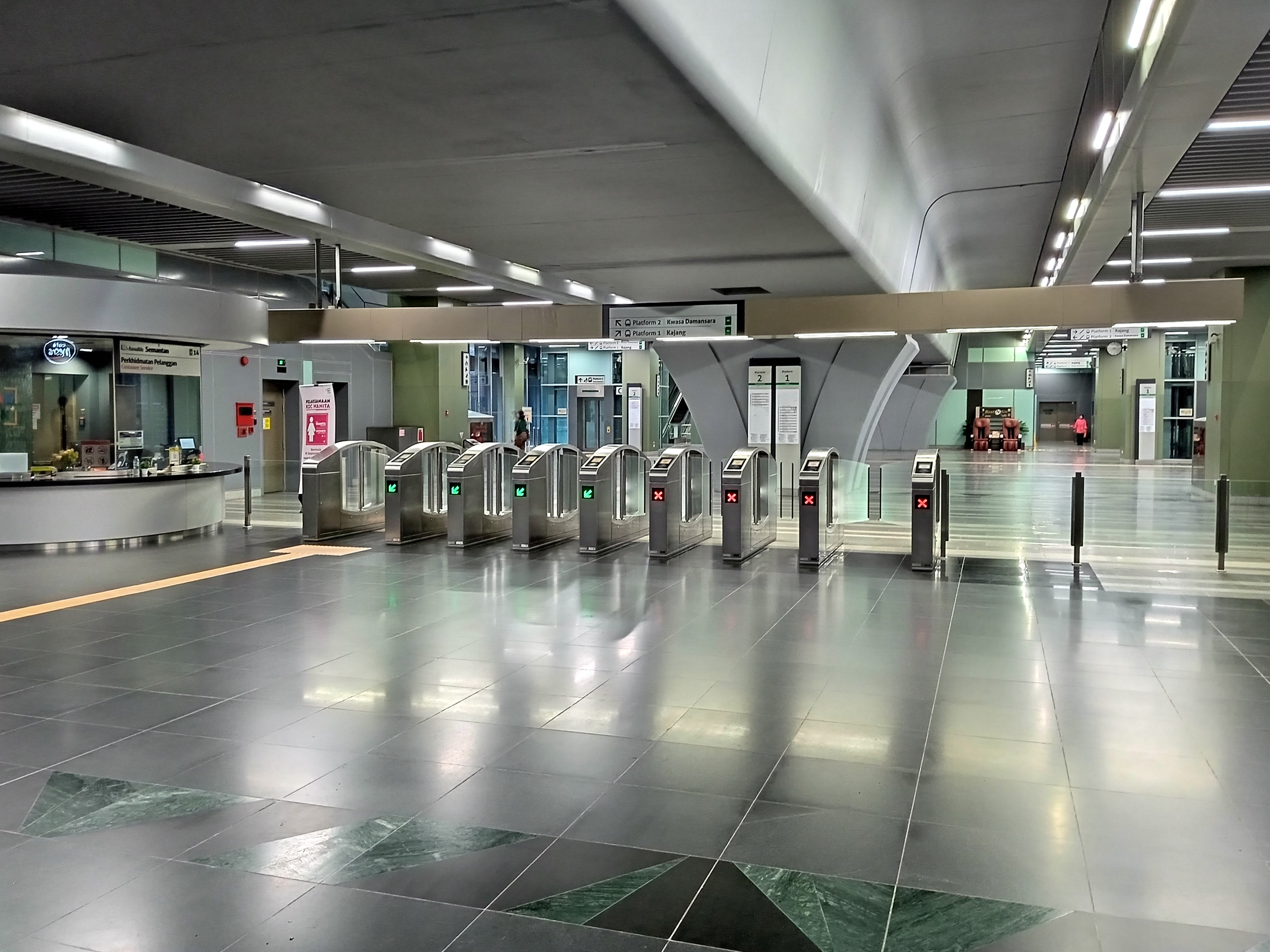
Concourse level of the station

Platform level of the station

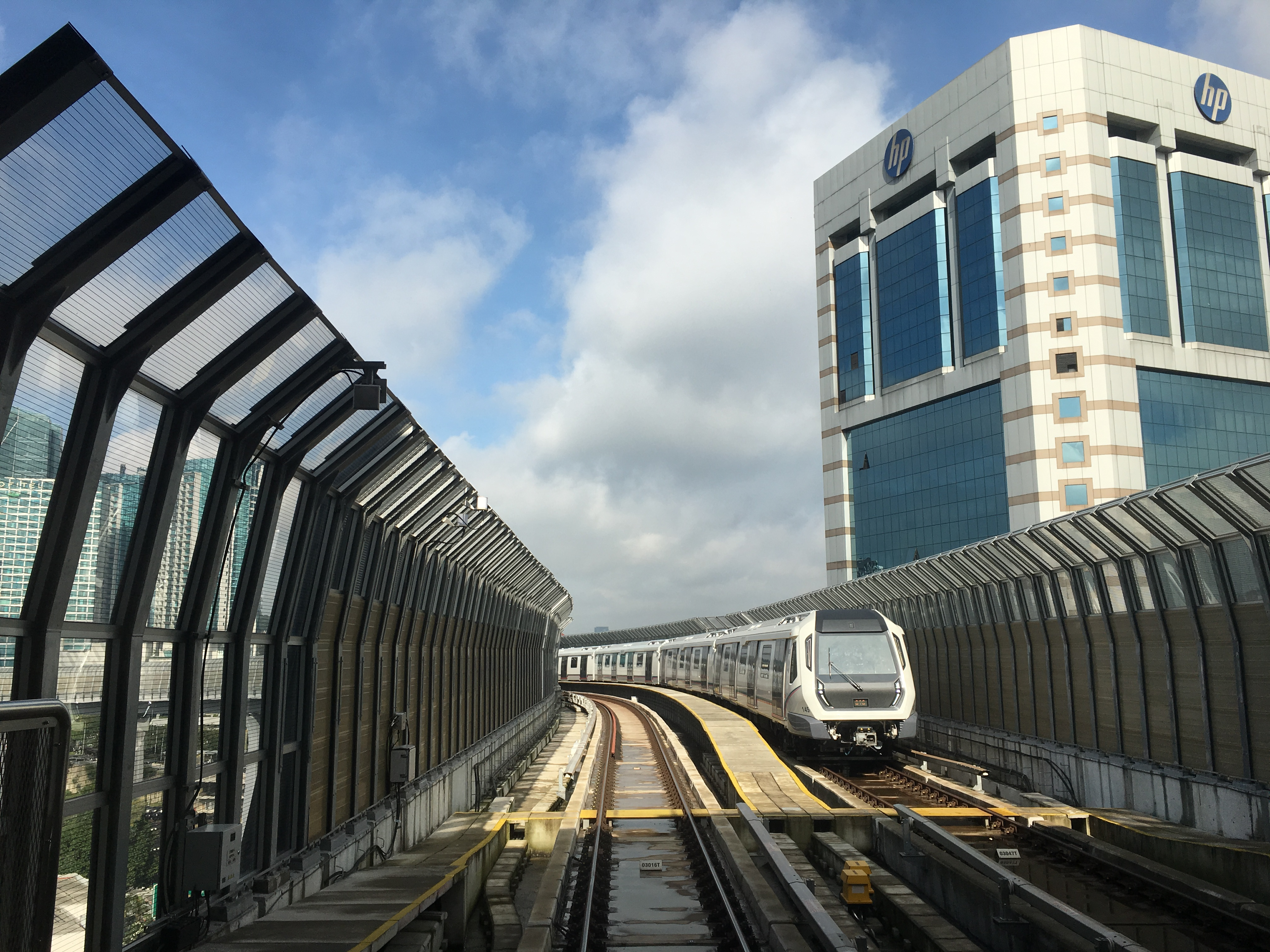
Kajang-bound train approaching the station

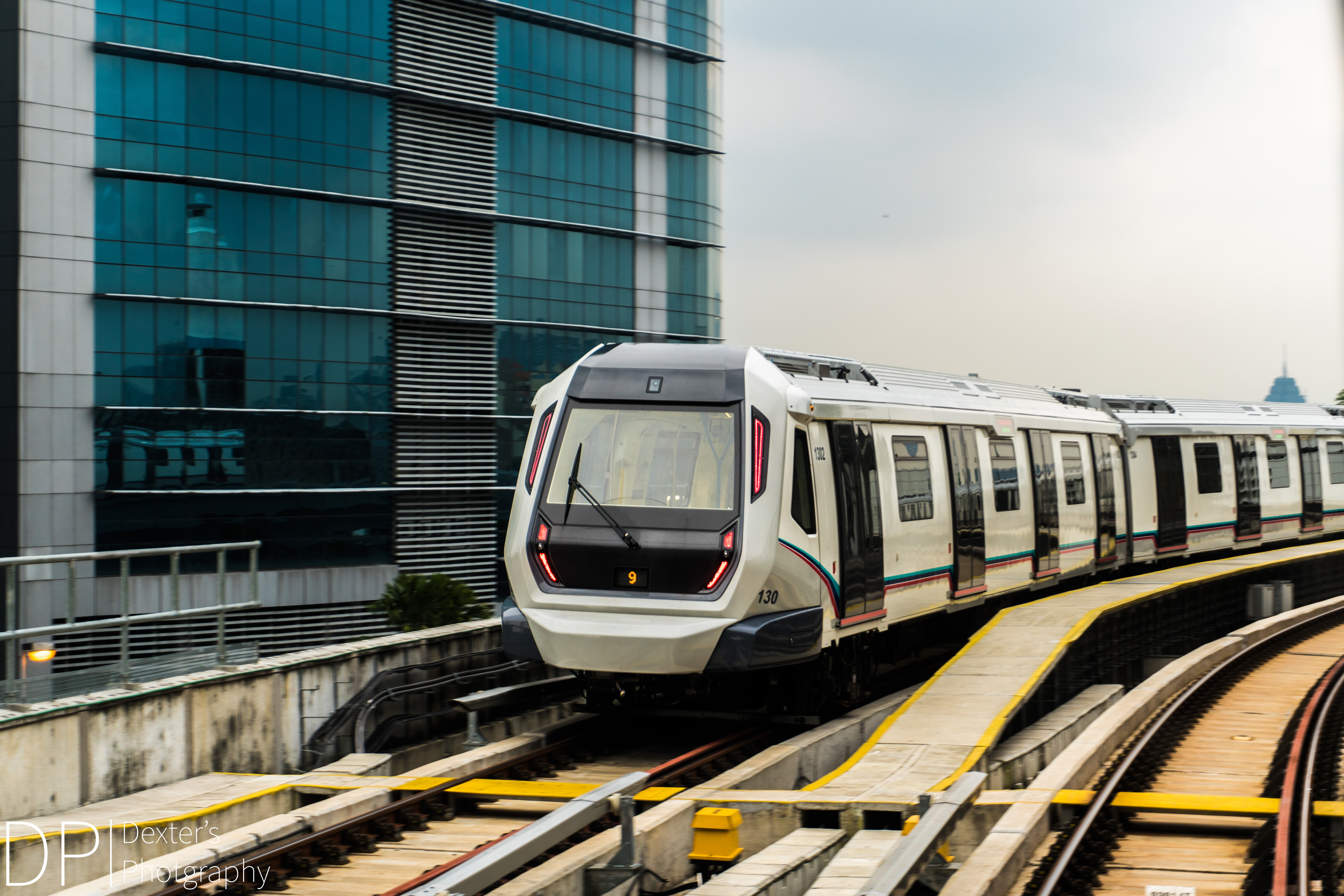
Kajang-bound train leaving the station
