= Jalan Damansara =

Road in Malaysia

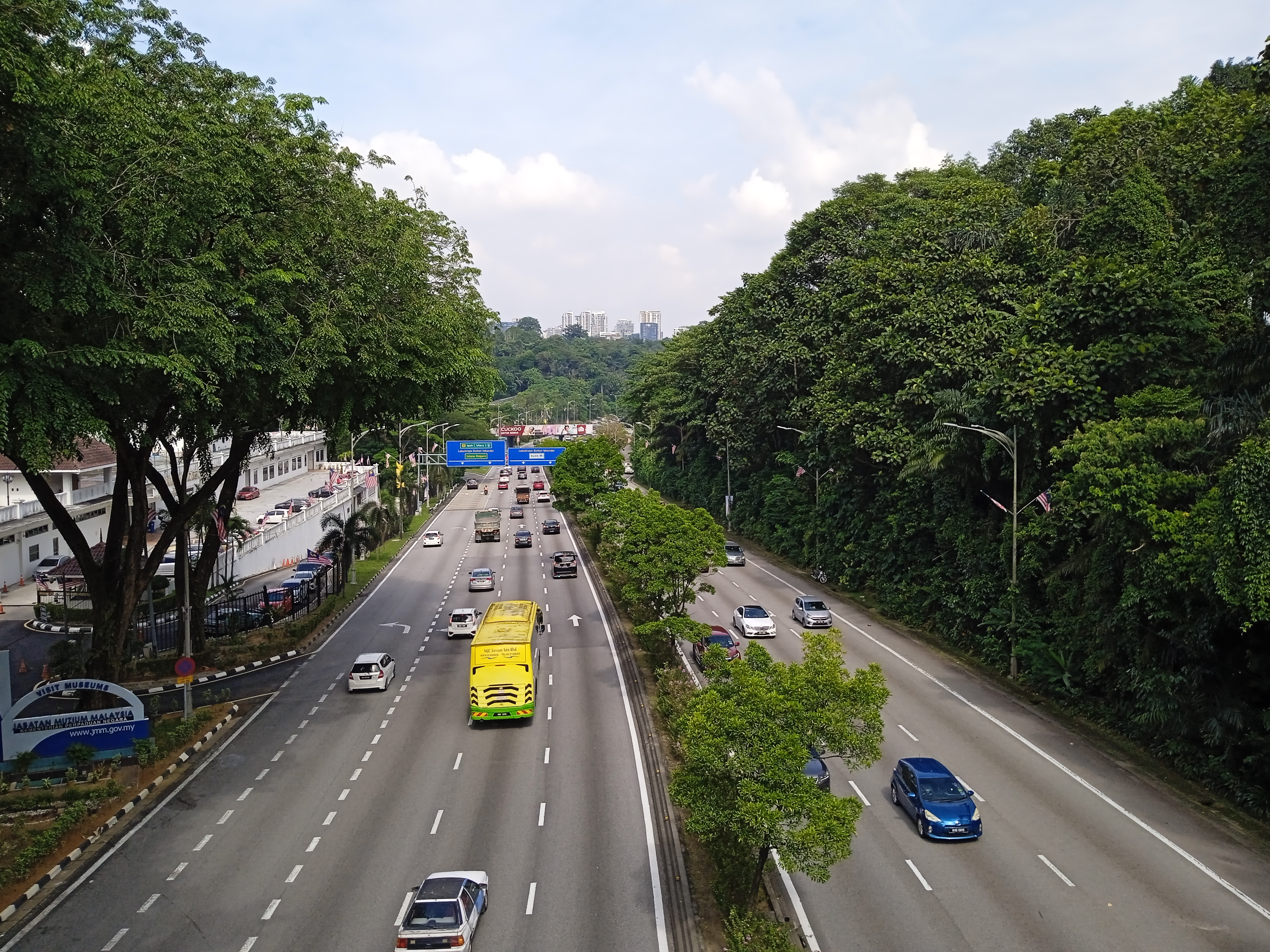

Major junctions
- North end: Bandar Sri Damansara
- Kuala Lumpur Middle Ring Road 1 (Lebuhraya Sultan Iskandar); Jalan Maarof; Damansara–Puchong Expressway; Sprint Expressway
- Southwest end: Jalan Sultan Hishamuddin

Location
- Country: Malaysia
- Primary destinations: Bandar Utama, Taman Tun Dr Ismail, Damansara Town Centre, Damansara Heights, Bukit Persekutuan, KL Sentral

Highway system
- Highways in Malaysia; Expressways; Federal; State

Jalan Damansara is a major road in Kuala Lumpur, Malaysia. One of the oldest roads in the city, it currently serves as a link between the Damansara sections of Petaling Jaya and Kuala Lumpur (from Bandar Sri Damansara through to the Petaling Jaya suburbs of Bandar Utama and Damansara Utama and then to the heart of Kuala Lumpur through its suburbs of Taman Tun Dr. Ismail and Bukit Damansara).

== Name ==
Jalan Damansara was named after a small harbour-like settlement, which no longer exists, that was located near the mouth of the Damansara River along the Klang River. The harbour was known as Labuhan Sara – Labuhan means a place for ships to anchor, while sara can be taken to mean "departure" or "embarkation" (related to the word bersara meaning retirement). The name Damansara may have been originally Indian; in Hindustani, daman means "foothills" while sara may mean either "a mansion of wealth", or "water" in Sanskrit.

== History ==
=== Origin ===
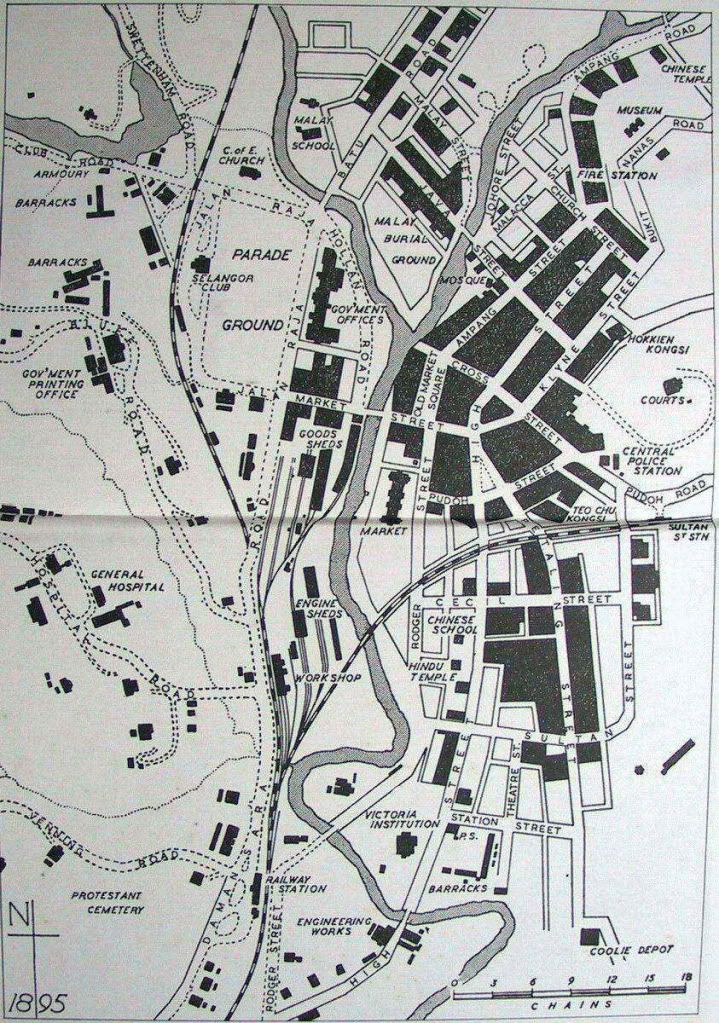
A map of colonial Kuala Lumpur in 1895, showing Damansara Road leading up to Jalan Raja and ending at Market Road (Leboh Pasar Besar)

Damansara Village was a popular place for ships to anchor for those who used the Klang River as a means of travel between the port town of Klang and the mining settlement of Kuala Lumpur. Although many boats can go up to the junction of Gombak River and Klang River in Kuala Lumpur, the steam boats used by the British to cut the travel time between Klang and Kuala Lumpur could only travel up to Damansara. In order to reach Kuala Lumpur, travellers would then need to traverse overland via a track, established in 1873, connecting Damansara and Kuala Lumpur through the jungles and hills of the Damansara (including the area currently known as Damansara Heights). Around the mid-1870s, after steam boats were introduced, construction began on an unmetalled road between the harbour of Damansara to Brickfields and Kuala Lumpur. This road would become known as Damansara Road. The road was 15.5 miles long, and Brickfields at the end of the road then become known as Batu Limabelas meaning "15th mile". By 1878, 12 miles of the earth road had been completed, with the remaining 3.5 miles built by Yap Ah Loy.

In 1880, the state capital of Selangor was moved to Kuala Lumpur. Following this, In 1895, the existing Damansara Road was extended to link the suburb of Brickfields (then the only exit and entry point into KL) and the city centre of Kuala Lumpur. The roads currently known today as Jalan Raja (facing the Sultan Abdul Samad Building) and Jalan Sultan Hishamuddin was known as a stretch of road called the Gombak Road, named after its crossing over the Gombak River. The extension included the Jalan Sultan Hishamuddin stretch of the then Gombak Road and Cenotaph Road (today known as Jalan Tugu), ending at a wooden bridge crossing the Klang River at Market Street (today known as Leboh Pasar Besar). This linked the then Damansara Road to Brickfields Road (known today as Jalan Travers), which ran to Brickfields.

=== Damansara Road today ===
Not much remains of the original Damansara Road today. It eventually became a pioneer road of the Damansara–Puchong Expressway and the Damansara Link of the Sprint Expressway. Because sections of the road parts of these highways, Jalan Damansara currently exists in fragments at several locations. The intervening sections of the original road now link with stretches of the road that form these highways at different locations:

- Near Bukit Lanjan where it continues alongside the Damansara–Puchong Expressway (through the Kota Damansara sections) and then merges completely with the highway until it diverges into its original course through the Kuala Lumpur suburb of Taman Tun.
- In the suburbs of Taman Tun where Jalan Damansara exists as a short residential road cordoned off from the rest of the existing road, off Jalan Burhanuddin Helmi.
- Near Taman Tun where it merges with the Sprint Highway this time through the Damansara area of Petaling Jaya and Kuala Lumpur. It then diverges from the highway (near the Semantan interchange at Pusat Bandar Damansara) through Bukit Damansara where it connects with the MRR1 and then ends at Jalan Sultan Hishamuddin (near the Kuala Lumpur railway station)

== Junction lists ==
Legend:

- I/C - Interchange, I/S - Intersection, RSA - Rest and service area, OBR - Overhead bridge restaurant, R/R - Restaurant and rest plaza, L/B - Layby, V/P - Vista point, TN - tunnel, T/P - Toll plaza, BR - Bridge
- C - Cloverleaf, S - Stack, T-A - Trumpet-A, T-B - Trumpet-B, DT - Directional-T/Y, SDT - Semi-Directional-T/Y, P-Y - Partial-Y, D - Diamond, P-C - Partial cloverleaf, D-D - Diverging diamond, D-R - Direct ramp

State/territory	District	Location	km	mi	Exit	Name	Destinations	Notes
Selangor	Petaling	Sri Damansara				Sri Damansara–TTDI	see also Damansara–Puchong Expressway	
Kuala Lumpur	Segambut	TTDI				Bukit Lanjan–Penchala–TTDI	Bukit Lanjan – Jalan Bukit Lanjan 2, Jalan Bukit Lanjan 4, Jalan Bukit Lanjan 4/1, Jalan Bukit Lanjan 6 Wisma Mofaz – Petronas; Kampung Sungai Penchala – Jalan Sungai Penchala; TTDI – Jalan Burhanuddin Helmi	Northbound
Kuala Lumpur	Segambut	TTDI				TTDI-LDP	Damansara–Puchong Expressway – Kelana Jaya, Petaling Jaya, Puchong, Putrajaya, Cyberjaya	Interchange
Kuala Lumpur	Segambut	TTDI				TTDI town centre	Shell, Petronas; DBKL branch office	Southbound
Kuala Lumpur	Segambut	TTDI				Taman Tun Dr Ismail	Jalan Tun Mohd Fuad – Taman Tun Dr Ismail, Plaza VADS (formerly Menara IBM), Menara LGB, TTDI wet market	T-junctions
Kuala Lumpur	Segambut	TTDI				SS 20	Jalan SS 20/20 – Jalan SS 20/21, KPJ Damansara Specialist Hospital	Northbound
Kuala Lumpur	Segambut	TTDI				Jalan Damansara Lama Exit	Menara Glomac	Northbound
Kuala Lumpur	Segambut	TTDI				Jalan Wan Kadir	Jalan Wan Kadir	T-junctions
Kuala Lumpur	Segambut	TTDI				TTDI MRT station	P&R TTDI MRT station 9	
Kuala Lumpur	Segambut	TTDI				TTDI–Damansara Link	Sprint Expressway (Damansara Link) – Petaling Jaya, Damansara Town Centre, Kuala Lumpur, Putra World Trade Centre (PWTC)	Junctions
Kuala Lumpur	Lembah Pantai	Damansara Town Centre				SS 20	Jalan SS 20/20 – Jalan SS 20/21	T-junctions
Kuala Lumpur	Lembah Pantai	Damansara Town Centre				SS 20–Damansara Town Centre	see also Sprint Expressway (Damansara Link)	
Kuala Lumpur	Lembah Pantai	Damansara Town Centre				Damansara Town Centre; Damansara City		Trumpet interchange
Kuala Lumpur	Lembah Pantai	Damansara Town Centre				Lower Damansara	Taman SA – Jalan Buluh Perindu; Damansara Heights – International Islamic University Malaysia (IIUM) Institute of Islamic Banking & Finance (IIiBF), Lorong Mempoyan, Jalan Jelutong	Northbound
Kuala Lumpur	Lembah Pantai	Damansara Town Centre				Instac		
Kuala Lumpur	Lembah Pantai	Damansara Town Centre				Lower Damansara	Bukit Persekutuan – Jalan Terrenganu, Jalan Pulau Pinang	Northbound
Kuala Lumpur	Lembah Pantai	Damansara Town Centre				Galeria Sri Perdana	Galeria Sri Perdana	T-junctions
Kuala Lumpur	Lembah Pantai	Muzium Negara				Lower Damansara–Muzium Negara	see also Kuala Lumpur Middle Ring Road 1	
Kuala Lumpur	Lembah Pantai	Muzium Negara				Muzium Negara–Jalan Sultan Hishamuddin	see also Jalan Bangsar	
1.000 mi = 1.609 km; 1.000 km = 0.621 mi: Concurrency terminus; Incomplete access
