= Jalan Prof. Khoo Kay Kim =

Road in Malaysia

- Jalan Semangat (before July 2019)
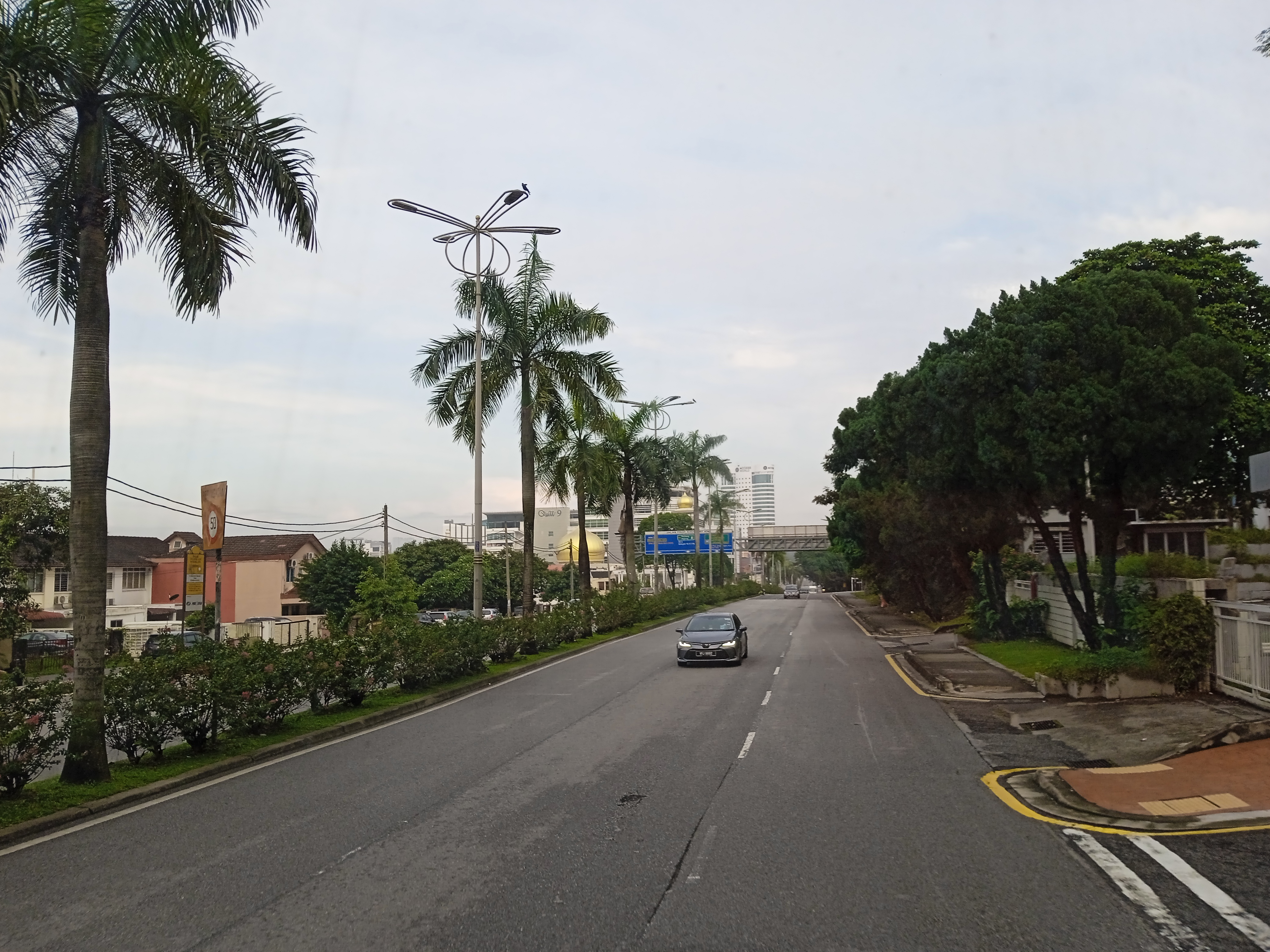

Route information
- Existed: 1960–present
- History: Completed in 1961

Major junctions
- northwest end: Bulatan Rothmans roundabout
- Jalan Harapan; Jalan Universiti; Jalan Kemajuan; Jalan Utara
- Southeast end: Jalan Utara junctions

Location
- Country: Malaysia

Highway system
- Highways in Malaysia; Expressways; Federal; State

Jalan Prof. Khoo Kay Kim, previously known as Jalan Semangat is a major road in Petaling Jaya city, Selangor, Malaysia. To honour the late Khoo's contributions during his life, the Sultan of Selangor, Sultan Sharafuddin Idris Shah renamed the road after Tan Sri Prof. Khoo Kay Kim, who had died in 2019. The road was renamed in July 2019.

== Landmarks ==
- British American Tobacco factory
- Bulatan Rothmans roundabout
- Tun Abdul Aziz Mosque (Masjid Bulat)
- Jaya Supermarket
- Jaya 33

== Development ==
The Rothmans Roundabout or Bulatan Rothmans was named after the tobacco company Rothmans of Pall Mall (Malaysia) Berhad (now British American Tobacco) that used to operate in the area. The roundabout is located at the intersection of Section 17, Section 14, Section 19 and SS2. The roundabout has been synonymous with traffic congestion, especially during peak hours. In 2009, the roundabout was upgraded into a fourth junction.

== List of junctions ==
km	Exit	Junctions	To	Remarks
		Bulatan Rothmans	North; Jalan Harapan; Section—until -- South; Jalan 19/1; Taman Paramount/Sea Park (Section 20 and 21) East; Jalan Universiti; Section—until -- International Islamic University Malaysia (IIUM); University Malaya Medical Centre	Junctions
		British American Tobacco factory		
		Guang Ming Daily		
		Jalan 13/6	Northeast; Jalan 13/6	T-junctions
		Dutch Baby milk factory		
		Quill		
		Jalan Dato' Abdul Aziz (Jalan 14/29)	Southwest; Jalan Dato' Abdul Aziz (Jalan 14/29); Section 14; Taman Paramount/Sea Park (Section 20 and 21)	T-junctions
		Tun Abdul Aziz Mosque (Masjid Bulat)		
		Jalan Bersatu (Jalan 13/4)	Northeast; Jalan Bersatu (Jalan 13/4)	T-junctions
		Section 14	Southeast; Jalan 14/14; Section 14	
		Jaya 33		
		Section 14	Southwest; Jalan 14/17; Section 14; Digital Mall	From Jalan Utara only
		Jaya Supermarket		
		Jalan Dato' Jamil Rais (Jalan 14/15)	Southwest; Jalan Dato' Jamil Rais (Jalan 14/15); Section 14; Sea Park (Section 20 and 21)	LILO exit
		Jalan Kemajuan	Northeast; Jalan Kemajuan; Jalan Dato' Abu Bakar; Jalan Universiti	T-junctions
		Jalan Utara	Petaling Jaya Inner Ring Road Jalan Utara; East Only; Petaling Jaya New Town; Shah Alam; Klang; Kuala Lumpur; Bangsar; Filem Negara Malaysia	T-junctions
