= Jalan Dato' Abu Bakar =

Road in Malaysia

Major junctions
- West end: Jalan Dato' Abu Bakar Interchange; Sprint Expressway Sprint Expressway
- Sprint Expressway Sprint Expressway; Jalan Universiti; Jalan Kemajuan
- Southeast end: Bulatan Universiti

Location
- Country: Malaysia

Highway system
- Highways in Malaysia; Expressways; Federal; State

Jalan Dato' Abu Bakar is a major road in Petaling Jaya city, Selangor, Malaysia.

== List of junctions ==
km	Exit	Junctions	To	Remarks
			North; Kelab Golf Perkhidmatan Awam (KGPA)	
Sprint Expressway Sprint Expressway; Damansara Link; Sprint border limit
		Jalan Dato' Abu Bakar-Sprint Expressway	Sprint Expressway Sprint Expressway; West; Taman Tun Dr Ismail; Kepong; Putrajaya; Cyberjaya; North–South Expressway Northern Route New Klang Valley Expressway; Ipoh; Klang; Kuala Lumpur International Airport (KLIA); Johor Bahru; East; Kuala Lumpur; Bangsar; Mont Kiara; Seremban	Diamond interchange
Sprint Expressway Sprint Expressway; Damansara Link; Sprint border limit
Federal Territory of Kuala Lumpur
FT Kuala Lumpur-Selangor border
Selangor Darul Ehsan; Petaling district border
Jalan Dato' Abu Bakar; MBPJ border limit
		Section 17 slip roads (Jalan 16/11)	West; Section 17 Slip Roads (Jalan 16/11); Section 17 commercial centre Section 17	
		Jalan 16/6	West; Jalan 16/6; Section 16 and 17 Universiti Malaya	T-junctions
Jalan Dato' Abu Bakar
		Bulatan Universiti	Jalan Universiti; Section—until -- International Islamic University Malaysia (IIUM) (Petaling Jaya Campus); East; Section—until -- University Malaya Medical Centre	Diamond interchange
Jalan Kemajuan
			South; Jalan Kemajuan; Petaling Jaya city centre Section 1 until 14	
