= Sprint Expressway =

Road in Malaysia

Expressway 23
- SPRINT Expressway (System of Traffic Dispersal in Western Kuala Lumpur)
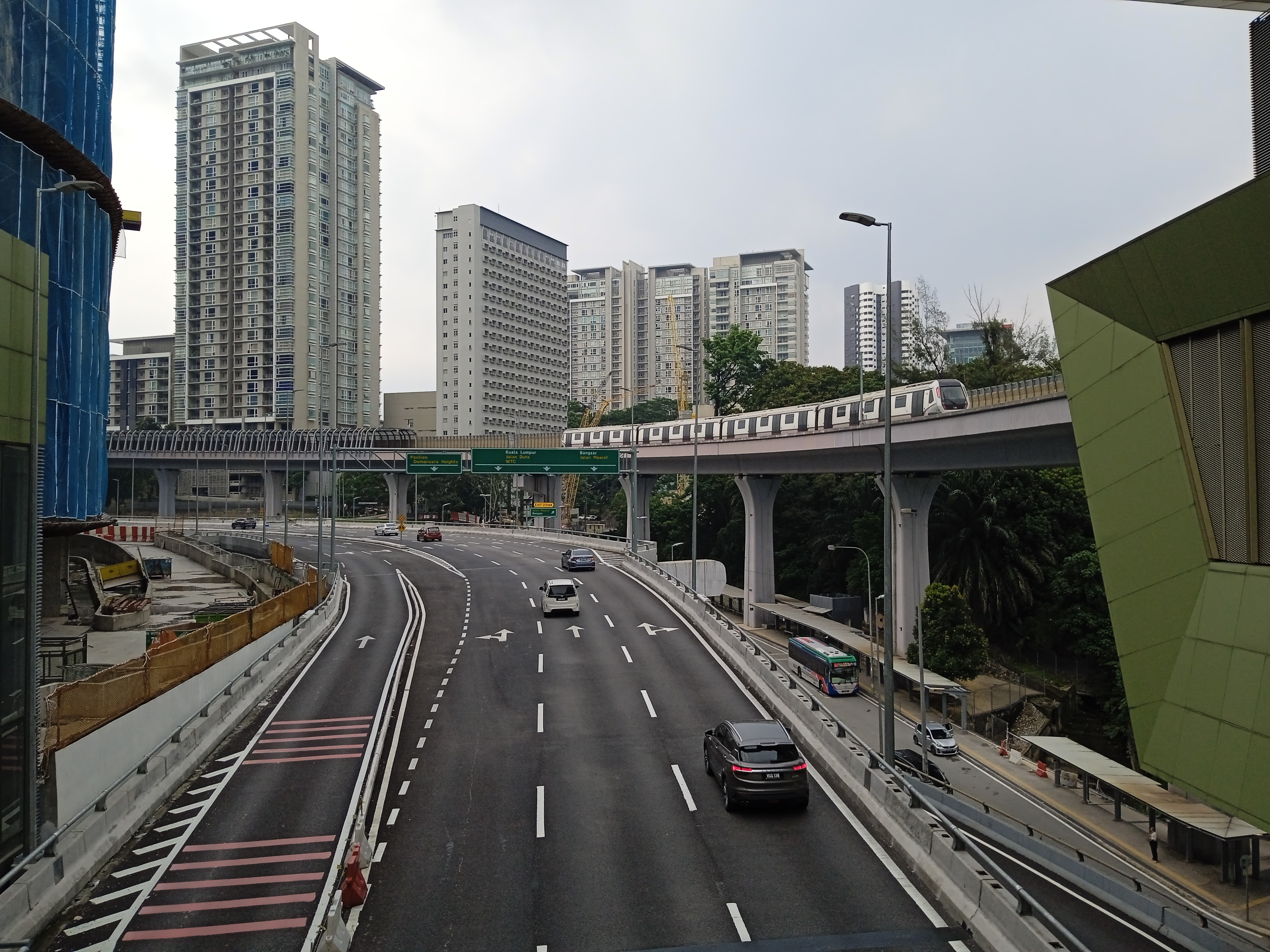

Route information
- Maintained by Sistem Penyuraian Trafik KL Barat Sdn Bhd (Sprint)
- Length: 26.5 km (16.5 mi) Kerinchi Link: 11.5 km (7.1 mi); Damansara Link: 9.5 km (5.9 mi); Penchala Link: 5.5 km (3.4 mi)
- Existed: 1999–present
- History: Completed in 2004
- Component highways: Kerinchi Link (Kg. Kerinchi–Mont Kiara); Penchala Link (Jalan Duta–Sungai Penchala); Damansara Link (Semantan–Damansara Interchange)

Major junctions
- New Klang Valley Expressway / AH2 / AH141; Damansara–Shah Alam Elevated Expressway; Damansara–Puchong Expressway; FT 2 Federal Highway; Jalan Tuanku Abdul Halim (Jalan Duta)

Location
- Country: Malaysia
- Primary destinations: Damansara Utama, Damansara City, Petaling Jaya, Taman Tun Dr Ismail, Mont Kiara, Pusat Sains Negara, Sri Hartamas, Bangsar, Kuala Lumpur, Kerinchi, Jalan Duta

Highway system
- Highways in Malaysia; Expressways; Federal; State

E23 SPRINT Expressway (Malay: Sistem Penyuraian Trafik Kuala Lumpur Barat, English: System of Traffic Dispersal in Western Kuala Lumpur, Chinese: 吉隆坡西部疏散大道) is the main expressway network in Klang Valley, Malaysia. The 26.5 km (16.5 mi) expressway is divided into three sections: the Kerinchi Link, Damansara Link and Penchala Link. It is a three-lane dual carriageway that was built to disperse traffic from congested inner city roads and narrow residential streets leading into Kuala Lumpur from the western suburbs, including Petaling Jaya, Damansara, and surrounding areas. It is one of the busiest expressway during rush hour to and from the city centre.

== Route background ==
=== Kerinchi Link ===
The 11.5 km (7.1 mi) section from Seputeh Interchange at Federal Highway to NKVE at Jalan Duta. The Kilometre Zero of the Kerinchi Link's section is located at Mont Kiara-NKVE Interchange.

=== Damansara Link ===
The 9.5 km (5.9 mi) section from Kayu Ara to Jalan Duta-Semantan Interchange. The Kilometre Zero of the Damansara Link's section is located at Kampung Kayu Ara in Petaling Jaya, Selangor.

=== Penchala Link ===
The 5.5 km (3.4 mi) section from Damansara–Puchong Expressway at Penchala, Penchala Tunnel to Mont Kiara. The Kilometre Zero of the Penchala Link's section is located at Mont Kiara Interchange.

== History ==
The proposal to build the expressway was motivated by heavy traffic on Jalan Damansara. The concession for the expressway was awarded to Sistem Penyuraian Trafik KL Barat Sdn Bhd (SPRINT). On 23 October 1997, the concession agreement was signed between the Government of Malaysia and Sprint for the privatisation of the improvement, upgrading, design, construction, maintenance, operations, and management of the expressway.

A supplementary agreement was subsequently signed on 4 September 1998 to defer the construction of the Penchala Link. The concession period is for 33 years and commenced on the effective date on 15 December 1998. After this period, the toll collection will cease and the highways will be handed over to the government. Construction began in 1999, which included acquiring and upgrading several major roads, such as Jalan Damansara, Jalan Kayu Ara, Jalan Sri Hartamas, and Jalan Semantan. The Kerinchi Link and Damansara Link were opened in 2001, followed by the Penchala Link in 2004.

This expressway also featured its own toll collection system known as the "FasTrak". On 1 July 2004, the FasTrak electronic payment system was replaced by Touch 'n Go and Smart TAG electronic payment systems.

=== Pioneer roads ===
The construction of the SPRINT Expressway included acquiring and upgrading several major roads:

==== Kerinchi Link ====
Roads	Sections
Jalan Sri Hartamas	Sri Hartamas
Jalan Bukit Kiara	Sri Hartamas–Bukit Kiara

==== Damansara Link ====
Roads	Sections
Jalan Semantan	Jalan Duta–Damansara Town Centre
Jalan Beringin	South side Jalan Johar–Semantan
Jalan Johar	Jalan Beringin–Jalan Damansara
Jalan Damansara	Damansara Town Centre–Damansara
Jalan Kayu Ara	Damansara–Kampung Kayu Ara

== Features ==
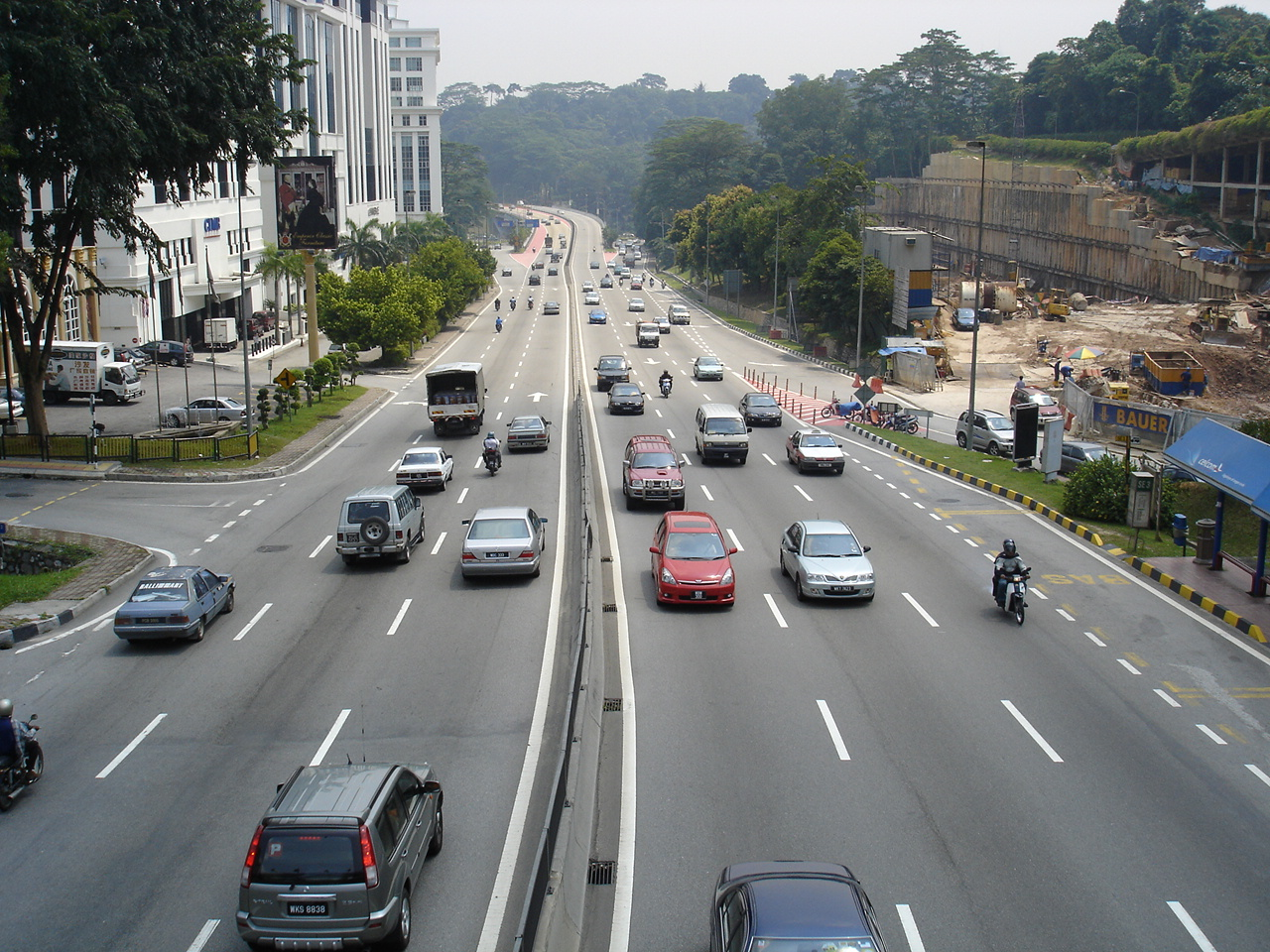
The Damansara Link section of Klang Valley's Sprint Expressway.

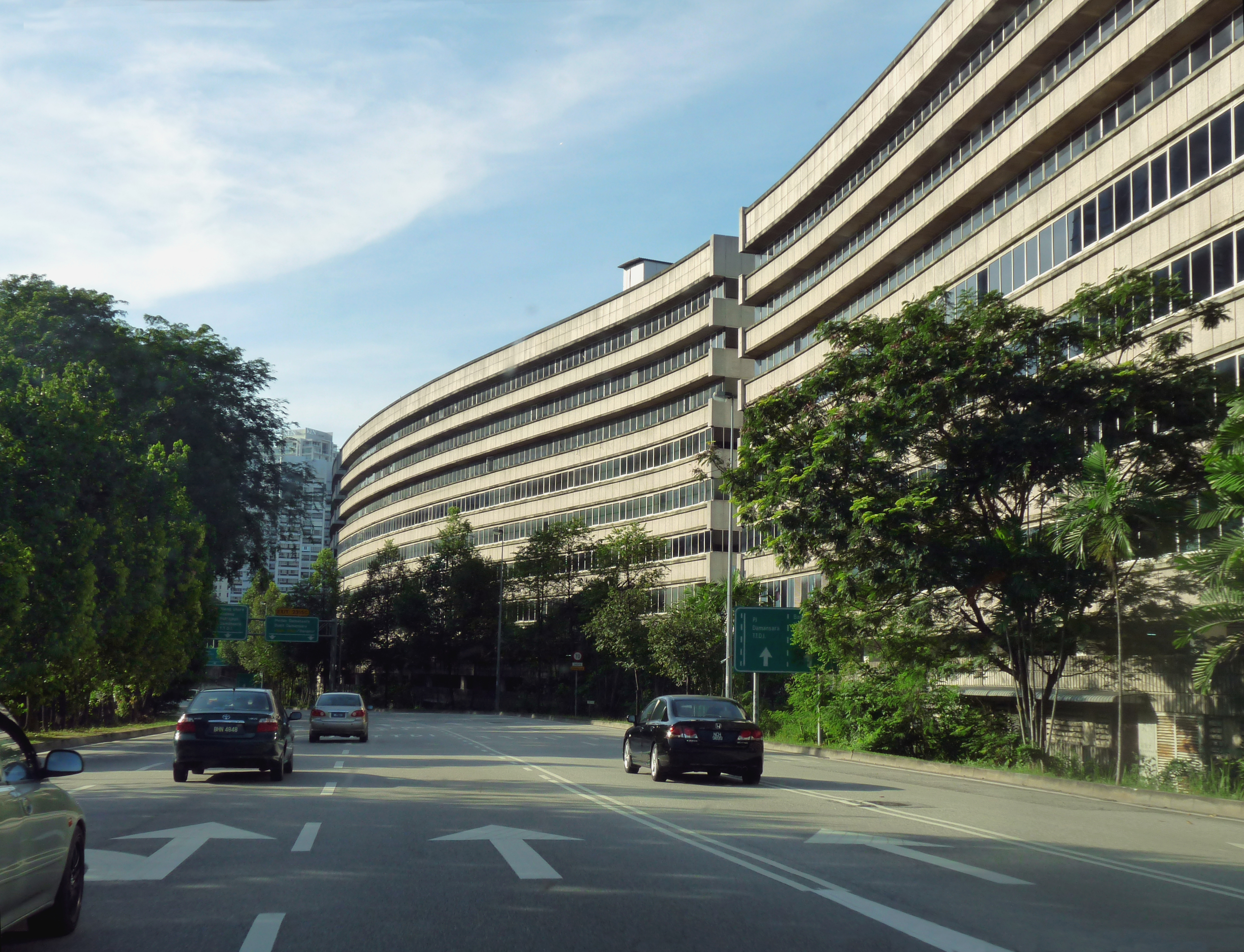
A section of the former Damansara Town Centre building as seen from Sprint Expressway's Damansara Link.

The expressway has several notable features:

- Kerinchi Link, the first double deck carriageway in Malaysia.
- Penchala Tunnel, the widest road tunnel in Malaysia.
- The former Damansara Town Centre on Damansara Link as the "island" of separated carriageway.
- The 3 km toll-free road at Damansara Link as an alternative to residents who live in Sections 16 and 17 of Petaling Jaya
- The Radar Speed Sign at Kerinchi Link.
- The elevated MRT Kajang Line section from Taman Tun Dr Ismail to Jalan Duta

== Controversies and criticisms ==
=== Kerinchi Link at the Universiti Malaya site ===
The double-deck carriageway design of Kerinchi Link from Bukit Kiara Interchange Exit 2307 to Kerinchi Interchange Exit 2308 was made as a result of the early controversial issues during the development stage. The construction of the stretch took place at the border of Universiti Malaya, which meant that the construction could take up some of the university area, which sparked complaints. As a result, the expressway concessionaire SPRINT came up with the idea of a double-deck carriageway which could reduce the land usage.

=== Damansara Town Centre as the "island" of separated carriageway ===
During the construction of the expressway, Jalan Semantan could not be widened to six lanes; consequently, the highway concessionaire took another main road at Damansara Town Centre for the Eastbound route, including Jalan Johar and Jalan Beringin. Damansara Town Centre became the "island" of the separated carriageways.

=== Unopened 2-lane off-ramp to Penchala Link at Sri Hartamas ===
==== Disputed ramp ====
When the expressway was opened to the traffic, the 530 m-long two-lane off-ramp from the Northbound direction of Kerinchi Link to Penchala Link at the Mont Kiara Interchange Exit 2303 could not be opened to traffic as a result of a land owner fencing the land which became a part of the ramp. The land owner's action has created difficulties among the residents of Bukit Kiara and Sri Hartamas, and even the highway concessionaire itself.

Meanwhile, the highway concessionaire has made a narrower temporary ramp to Penchala Link but according to the highway concessionaire, the temporary ramp is quite unsafe due to risks of being collided from behind. For the time being, the highway concessionaire is still negotiating with the land owner in order to open the two-lane ramp.

==== Opening the ramp ====
At 3pm, 3 June 2010, Works Minister Datuk Shaziman Abu Mansor officially opened this disputed ramp.

Hitherto, road users living in the Mont Kiara and Sri Hartamas areas wanting to go to Jalan Duta, Duta–Ulu Klang Expressway (DUKE) and Penchala Link only had two lanes to use.

"This new ramp will ease the movement of almost 22,000 vehicles per day", he told reporters after opening the ramp.

Shaziman said the 50-metre ramp, which was delayed for seven years owing to problems related to acquisition of land, was completed in five months after the intervention by the Malaysian Prime Minister, Datuk Seri Najib Tun Razak, who had immediately approved about RM20 million for the acquisition of land.

=== The old SJKC Damansara near Sprint Expressway ===
The old SJKC Damansara has one block located at Section 17 near Jalan Damansara (now Sprint Expressway). However, on 26 January 2001, the school was moved from old block at Section 17 to the new smart school at PJU 3, near Tropicana Golf and Country Club following the instructions from federal government that it no longer provided a "conducive learning environment" because of traffic congestion and noise pollution from the neighbouring Sprint Expressway.

== Tolls ==
The Sprint Expressway uses open toll systems.

=== Electronic Toll Collections (ETC) ===
As part of an initiative to facilitate faster transactions at the Kerinchi Link, Damansara Link and Penchala Link Toll Plazas, all toll transactions at three stretches toll plazas on the Sprint Expressway have been conducted electronically via Touch 'n Go cards or SmartTAGs since 2 March 2016.

=== Toll rates ===
(As of 15 October 2015)

Class	Type of vehicles	Rate (in Malaysian Ringgit (RM))		
Class	Type of vehicles	Kerinchi Link	Damansara Link (NKVE and TTDI bound only)	Penchala Link
0	Motorcycles, bicycles or vehicles with 2 or less wheels	Free		
1	Vehicles with 2 axles and 3 or 4 wheels excluding taxis	RM2.50	RM2.00	RM3.00
2	Vehicles with 2 axles and 5 or 6 wheels excluding buses	RM7.00	RM4.00	RM6.00
3	Vehicles with 3 or more axles	RM10.50	RM6.00	RM9.00
4	Taxis	RM1.80	RM1.00	RM1.50
5	Buses	RM1.50	RM1.00	RM2.00

=== Toll names ===
Abbreviation	Name
KCL	Kerinchi Link
DRL	Damansara Link
MTK	Mont Kiara
DMR	Damansara

== Junction lists ==
Legend:

- I/C - Interchange, I/S - Intersection, RSA - Rest and service area, OBR - Overhead bridge restaurant, R/R - Restaurant and rest plaza, L/B - Layby, V/P - Vista point, TN - tunnel, T/P - Toll plaza, BR - Bridge
- C - Cloverleaf, S - Stack, T-A - Trumpet-A, T-B - Trumpet-B, DT - Directional-T/Y, SDT - Semi-Directional-T/Y, P-Y - Partial-Y, D - Diamond, P-C - Partial cloverleaf, D-D - Diverging diamond, D-R - Direct ramp

=== Kerinchi Link (north–south) ===
The entire route is located in Federal Territory of Kuala Lumpur.

Location	km	mi	Exit	Name	Destinations	Notes
Taman Duta	0.0	0.0	2301	Jalan Duta I/C	New Klang Valley Expressway / AH141 – Ipoh, Klang, Kuala Lumpur International Airport (KLIA), Johor Bahru Duta–Ulu Klang Expressway / AH141 – Kepong, Batu Caves, Ulu Klang, Ampang, Genting Highlands, Kuantan; Jalan Tuanku Abdul Halim (Jalan Duta) – Jalan Duta, City Centre, Segambut	Directional-T interchange
Mont Kiara			2302	Mont Kiara I/C	Sprint Expressway (Penchala Link) – Taman Tun Dr. Ismail, Mutiara Damansara, Damansara, Puchong, Putrajaya, Cyberjaya, Sungai Besi	Stacked interchange
Sri Hartamas				Jalan Sri Hartamas 22 Exit	Jalan Sri Hartamas 22 – Desa Sri Hartamas	Mont Kiara bound
Sri Hartamas			2303	Sri Hartamas I/C	Jalan 19/70A – Desa Sri Hartamas, Mont Kiara, Segambut, Sri Hartamas, Jalan Duta, Plaza Damas	Diamond interchange
Bukit Kiara				Jalan 48/70 Exit	Jalan 48/70 – Kiara View	Mont Kiara bound
Bukit Kiara	3.9	2.4	2305	Pusat Sains Negara I/C	Persiaran Bukit Kiara – Bukit Kiara Equestrian & Country Resort, Pusat Sains Negara (National Science Centre), Bukit Damansara	Diamond interchange
Bukit Kiara				Securities Commission Malaysia	Securities Commission Malaysia	Kerinchi bound
Bukit Kiara				Royal Selangor Club	Royal Selangor Club	Mont Kiara bound
Bukit Kiara			2306	INTAN I/C	Jalan Bukit Kiara 1 – Kuala Lumpur Golf & Country Club, Sime Darby Convention Centre, Institut Tadbiran Awam Negara (INTAN) (National Institute of Public Administration) Main Gate	Diamond interchange
Bukit Kiara				Jalan Bukit Kiara Exit	Jalan Bukit Kiara 1 – Bukit Kiara, Bukit Kiara Sports Complex, Kuala Lumpur Golf & Country Club	Mont Kiara bound
Bukit Kiara			2307	Bukit Kiara I/C	Slip Roads to Jalan Dato' Abu Bakar – Section—until --, Section 17 commercial centre, Section 17; Sprint Expressway (Damansara Link) – Damansara, Taman Tun Dr. Ismail, Bangsar, Damansara Town Centre, City Centre, Putra World Trade Centre (PWTC) New Klang Valley Expressway / AH2 / AH141 – Ipoh, Klang, Kuala Lumpur International Airport (KLIA), Johor Bahru	Stacked interchange
Kerinchi			Double deck carriageway			
Kerinchi			Pantai Toll Plaza (both bounds; separated)			
Kerinchi			Double deck carriageway			
Kerinchi	11.5	7.1	2308	Kerinchi I/C	FT 2 (Federal Highway) – Petaling Jaya, Subang Jaya, Sultan Abdul Aziz Shah Airport, Shah Alam, Klang; Universiti LRT station 5 Setiawangsa–Pantai Expressway – Setiawangsa, Bandar Malaysia, Wangsa Maju, Kuantan	Directional-T interchange Diamond interchange Stacked interchange
1.000 mi = 1.609 km; 1.000 km = 0.621 mi: Electronic toll collection; Incomplete access

=== Damansara Link (southern west–east) ===
State/territory	District	Location	km	mi	Exit	Name	Destinations	Notes
Selangor	Petaling	Damansara			106	Damansara-NKVE I/C	New Klang Valley Expressway / AH2 / AH141 – Alor Setar, George Town, Ipoh, Rawang, Sungai Buloh, Kuala Lumpur, Kuantan, Klang, Shah Alam, Kuala Lumpur International Airport, Sungai Besi, Seremban, Malacca City, Johor Bahru	Trumpet interchange
Selangor	Petaling	Damansara			Damansara Toll Plaza			
Selangor	Petaling	Damansara				Tropicana Exit	Jalan Tropicana Selatan 1	Westbound LILO
Selangor	Petaling	Damansara				Lebuh Bandar Utama I/C	Lebuh Bandar Utama – Bandar Utama, 1 Utama, Bandar Utama Collage, Tropicana Dolf and Country Club, Damansara Idaman, Idaman Villas	Westbound entrance only
Selangor	Petaling	Damansara	0.0	0.0		Kampung Sungai Kayu Ara	Kampung Sungai Kayu Ara	
Selangor	Petaling	Damansara	0.1– 0.3	0.062– 0.19	2309	Kayu Ara flyover Kayu Ara I/C; Sungai Kayu Ara bridge	Jalan SS 23/23 – Damansara Jaya, Atria Shopping Gallery	Half-diamond interchange
Selangor	Petaling	Damansara	0.4	0.25		Jalan SS 21/1 Exit	Jalan SS 21/1 – Damansara Utama	Eastbound LILO
Selangor	Petaling	Damansara				Jalan SS 22/11 Exit	Jalan SS 22/11 – Damansara Jaya	Westbound LILO
Selangor	Petaling	Damansara	1.0	0.62	2310	Damansara Utama I/C	Damansara–Puchong Expressway – Kepong, Sungai Buloh, Bandar Utama, Taman Tun Dr. Ismail, Puchong, Putrajaya, Cyberjaya, Sungai Besi	Multi-level stacked diamond interchange
Selangor	Petaling	Damansara				Tropicana City Mall	Tropicana City Mall	Parking ramp interchanges
Kuala Lumpur	Segambut	Bukit Kiara				SS 20 Exit	Jalan Damansara – SS 20, Tropicana City Mall	Eastbound
Kuala Lumpur	Segambut	Bukit Kiara			Sungai Penchala bridge			
Kuala Lumpur	Segambut	Bukit Kiara			Bukit Kiara Muslim Cemetery (eastbound, for Muslims only)			
Kuala Lumpur	Segambut	Bukit Kiara			2311	Section 17 I/C	Jalan 17/21 – Section 17	Interchange
Kuala Lumpur	Segambut	Bukit Kiara			2312	TTDI South I/C	Jalan Damansara – Taman Tun Dr. Ismail; Damansara–Puchong Expressway – Bandar Utama, Mutiara Damansara, Sungai Buloh, Kepong	Interchange with ramp to Jalan Damansara
Kuala Lumpur	Segambut	Bukit Kiara	3.0	1.9	Damansara Link Toll Plaza L/B – Sprint operation office (TTDI bound)			
Kuala Lumpur	Segambut	Bukit Kiara			Damansara Link Toll Plaza (Plaza B = NKVE bound)			
Kuala Lumpur	Segambut	Bukit Kiara				Jalan 17/1 Exit	Jalan 17/1 – Section 17, International Islamic University Malaysia (IIUM) (Petaling Jaya Campus)	Junctions on the Eastin Hotel one way
Kuala Lumpur	Segambut	Bukit Kiara			Damansara Link Toll Plaza (Plaza A = TTDI bound)			
Kuala Lumpur	Segambut	Bukit Kiara			Petronas L/B – Dunkin' Donuts (eastbound)			
Kuala Lumpur	Segambut	Bukit Kiara				Phileo Damansara MRT station	Phileo Damansara MRT station 9	
Kuala Lumpur	Segambut	Bukit Kiara				TTDI Bound Exit	Jalan Damansara – Taman Tun Dr. Ismail; Damansara–Puchong Expressway – Bandar Utama, Mutiara Damansara, Sungai Buloh, Kepong	
Kuala Lumpur	Segambut	Bukit Kiara				Elevated U-Turn	Kuala Lumpur, Damansara Town Centre, Damansara City	From Section 17 slip roads (Jalan 16/11) to Kuala Lumpur via Damansara Link
Kuala Lumpur	Segambut	Bukit Kiara	4.0	2.5	2313	Section 16 I/C	Public Service Golf Club (KGPA), Section 17 Slip Roads (Jalan 16/11), Section 16 commercial centre, Section 16, Section 17; Jalan Dato' Abu Bakar – Jalan Universiti, Jalan Kemajuan, Universiti Malaya, Petaling Jaya	Diamond interchange
Kuala Lumpur	Segambut	Bukit Kiara			2307	Bukit Kiara I/C	Slip Roads (Jalan 16/11) to Jalan Dato' Abu Bakar – Section—until --, Section 16 commercial centre, Section 16, Section 17; Sprint Expressway (Kerinchi Link) – Ipoh, Segambut, Mont Kiara, Sri Hartamas, Kerinchi, Petaling Jaya, Cheras, Seremban	Stacked interchange
Kuala Lumpur	Segambut	Bukit Kiara				Jalan Gegambir Exit	Jalan Gegambir – Universiti Malaya	Westbound LILO
Kuala Lumpur	Segambut	Bukit Kiara				Jalan Setiapuspa Exit	Jalan Setiapuspa – Taman Bukit Damansara	Eastbound LILO
Kuala Lumpur	Segambut	Damansara Town Centre				Jalan Medang Tanduk Exit	Jalan Medang Tanduk – Bukit Bandaraya	Westbound LILO
Kuala Lumpur	Segambut	Damansara Town Centre			2314	Maarof I/C	Jalan Maarof – Bangsar, KL Sentral, Mid Valley City	Interchange
Kuala Lumpur	Segambut	Damansara Town Centre			Start/End of double deck carriageway			
Kuala Lumpur	Segambut	Damansara Town Centre				Jalan Kasah Exit	Jalan Kasah – Petron	Junctions from Damansara only
Kuala Lumpur	Segambut	Damansara Town Centre				Pusat Bandar Damansara MRT station	P&R Pusat Bandar Damansara MRT station 9	
Kuala Lumpur	Segambut	Damansara Town Centre				Jalan Johar Exit	Jalan Johar	Junctions from Jalan Duta only
Kuala Lumpur	Segambut	Damansara Town Centre			2314A	Bukit Damansara I/C	Jalan Beringin/Jalan Johar – Damansara Heights, Damansara Town Centre, Damansara City, U-turn to Petaling Jaya	Interchange from Damansara only
Kuala Lumpur	Segambut	Damansara Town Centre			2314B	Jalan Damanlela I/C	Jalan Damanlela	Off ramp from Damansara only
Kuala Lumpur	Segambut	Damansara Town Centre				Damansara City Exit	Damansara City	Off ramp from Damansara only
Kuala Lumpur	Segambut	Damansara Town Centre			2315D	I/C	Bangsar, Jalan Maarof, Taman Duta, HELP Residency	Trumpet interchange from Jalan Duta only
Kuala Lumpur	Segambut	Damansara Town Centre			2315C	I/C	Jalan Damansara – Galeria Sri Perdana, Medan Damansara, Bukit Damansara, Jalan Johar, Bangsar	Trumpet interchange from Jalan Duta only
Kuala Lumpur	Lembah Pantai	Semantan			2315	Semantan I/C	Jalan Dungun/Jalan Beringin – U-turn to Kuala Lumpur	Interchange
Kuala Lumpur	Lembah Pantai	Semantan			Start/End of double deck carriageway			
Kuala Lumpur	Lembah Pantai	Semantan				Semantan MRT station	Semantan MRT station 9	
Kuala Lumpur	Lembah Pantai	Semantan				Jalan Damansara Endah Exit	Jalan Damansara Endah – ECM Libra Building	Junctions from Jalan Duta only
Kuala Lumpur	Lembah Pantai	Semantan				Jalan Dungun Exit	Jalan Dungun – Wisma UN (United Nations Headquarters in Malaysia), Wisma I&P, HELP University	Eastbound exit only
Kuala Lumpur	Lembah Pantai	Semantan				Changkat Semanatan Underpass Exit	Changkat Semanatan – Istana Negara (Gate 2), Suruhanjaya Koperasi Malaysia Headquarters, Wisma Chase Perdana	Trumpet interchange
Kuala Lumpur	Lembah Pantai	Semantan				Wisma Damansara	Wisma Damansara	From Damansara only
Kuala Lumpur	Lembah Pantai	Semantan				Wisma ELM	HELP University (ELM Business School)	From Damansara only
Kuala Lumpur	Lembah Pantai	Semantan	9.5	5.9		Jalan Duta-Semantan I/C	Jalan Tuanku Abdul Halim (Jalan Duta) – Ipoh, Kuantan, Segambut, City Centre, Malaysian Houses of Parliament, Putra World Trade Centre (PWTC), Seremban	Trumpet interchange
1.000 mi = 1.609 km; 1.000 km = 0.621 mi: Electronic toll collection; Incomplete access

=== Penchala Link (northern west–east) ===
State/territory	District	Location	km	mi	Exit	Name	Destinations	Notes
Selangor	Petaling	Penchala	6.2	3.9	2304	Penchala I/C	Jalan PJU 8/1 – Damansara Perdana, Desa Temuan; Jalan PJU 7/9 – Mutiara Damansara, The Curve, IKANO Power Centre-IKEA; Damansara–Puchong Expressway – Ipoh, Bandar Sri Damansara, Sungai Buloh, Kepong, Petaling Jaya, Puchong, Putrajaya, Cyberjaya, Sungai Besi	Stacked interchange
Selangor	Petaling	Penchala			2316	DASH Highway I/C	Damansara–Shah Alam Elevated Expressway – Puncak Alam, Puncak Perdana, Subang Jaya, Sungai Buloh, Kota Damansara	Stacked interchange
Kuala Lumpur	Segambut	Penchala	6.0	3.7	Selangor–Kuala Lumpur border			
Kuala Lumpur	Segambut	Penchala			Petronas L/B (eastbound)			
Kuala Lumpur	Segambut	TTDI North	5.0	3.1	TTDI North flyover Sungai Penchala bridge			
Kuala Lumpur	Segambut	TTDI North			2317	TTDI North flyover TTDI North I/C	Jalan Datuk Sulaiman – Kampung Sungai Penchala, Taman Tun Dr. Ismail, Rasta @ TTDI	Diamond interchange
Kuala Lumpur	Segambut	Mont Kiara			Motorcycle shelter points (eastbound; motorcycles only)			
Kuala Lumpur	Segambut	Mont Kiara	4.0	2.5	Penchala Tunnel (Maximum height: 5 m); Length: 0.7 km (0.43 mi)			
Kuala Lumpur	Segambut	Mont Kiara			Motorcycle shelter points (westbound; motorcycles only)			
Kuala Lumpur	Segambut	Mont Kiara			Petronas L/B (westbound)			
Kuala Lumpur	Segambut	Mont Kiara			Bukit Kiara Toll Plaza			
Kuala Lumpur	Segambut	Mont Kiara	0.0	0.0	2302	Mont Kiara flyover Mont Kiara I/C	New Klang Valley Expressway / AH141 – Ipoh, Klang, Kuala Lumpur International Airport, Johor Bahru, Taman Duta, City Centre, Segambut Duta–Ulu Klang Expressway / AH141 – Kepong, Batu Caves, Ampang Jaya, Ulu Kelang, Cheras, Genting Highlands, Kuantan; Sprint Expressway (Kerinchi Link) – Mont Kiara, Sri Hartamas, Damansara Heights, Damansara Town Centre, Petaling Jaya, Cheras, Seremban	Stacked interchange
1.000 mi = 1.609 km; 1.000 km = 0.621 mi: Electronic toll collection

== Gallery ==
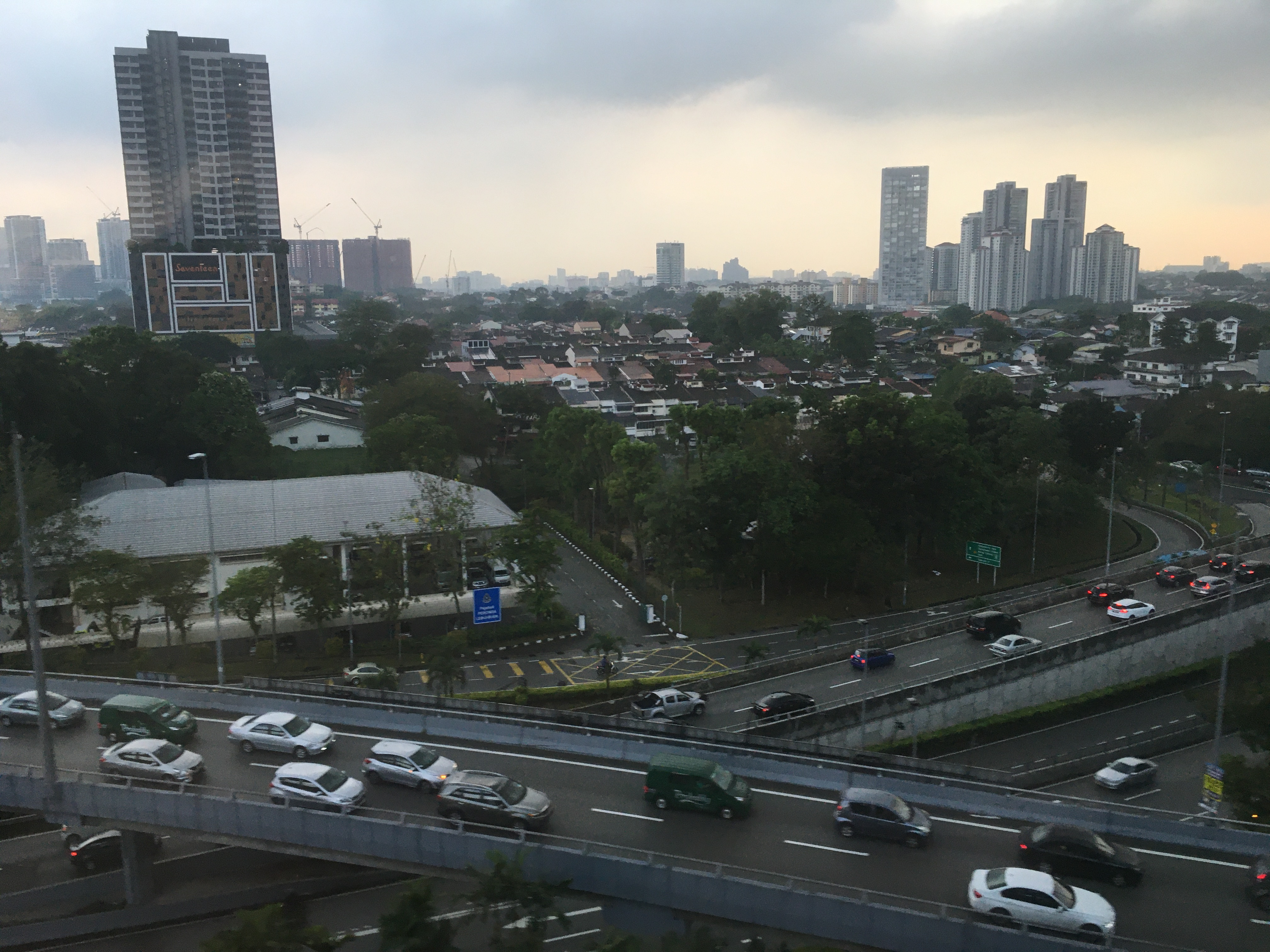
TTDI South Interchange

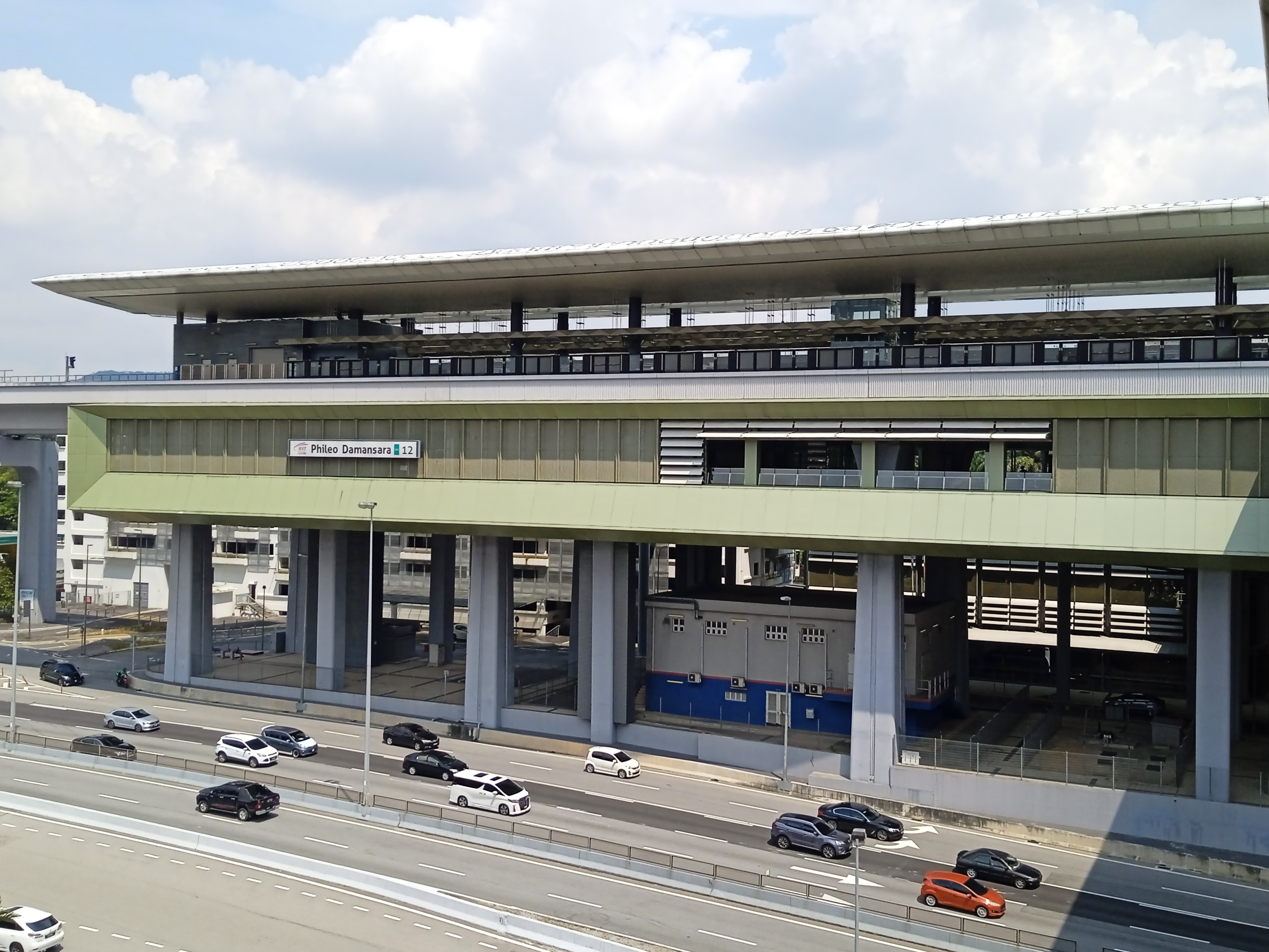
Phileo Damansara MRT station

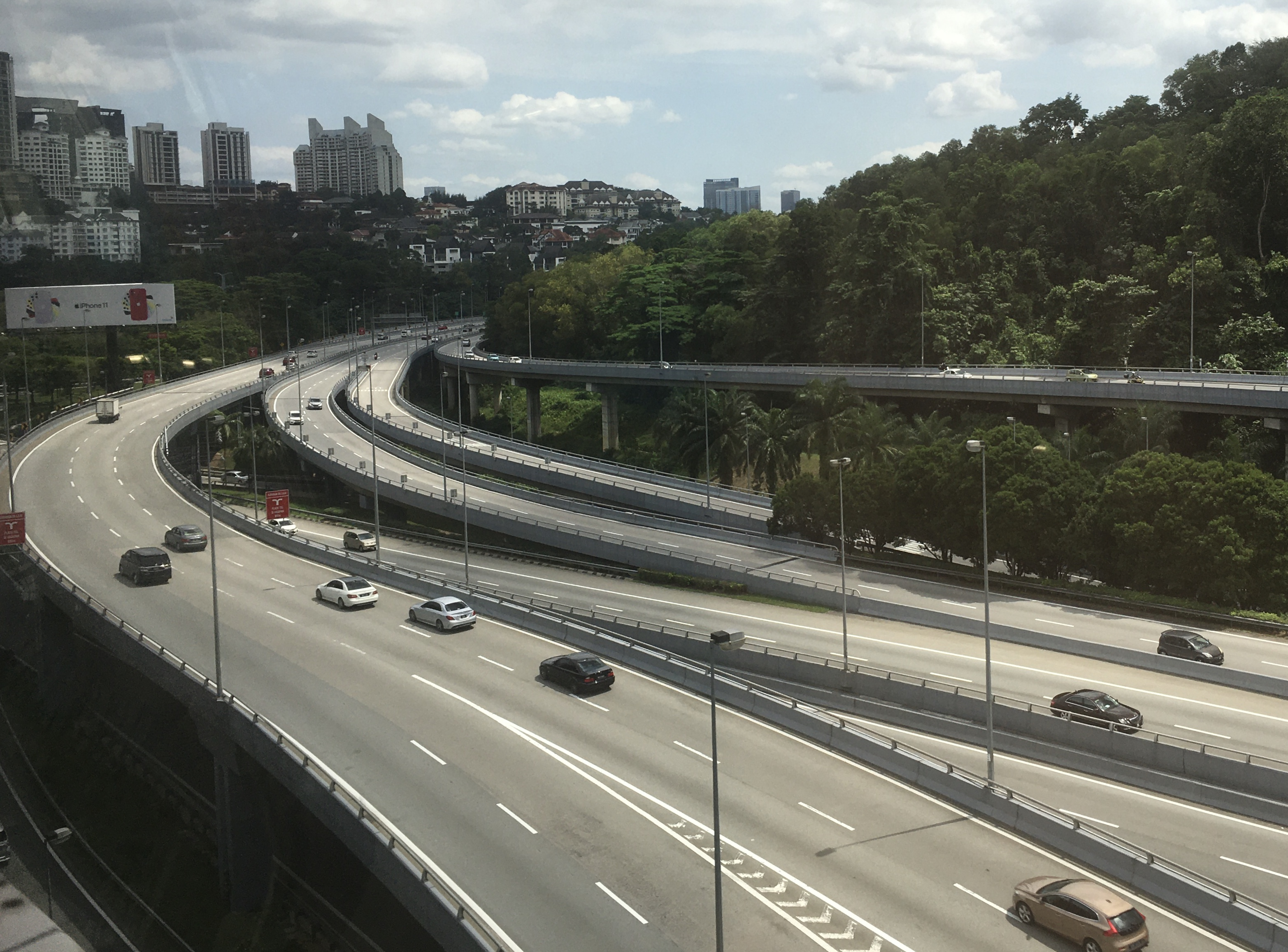
Bukit Kiara Interchange

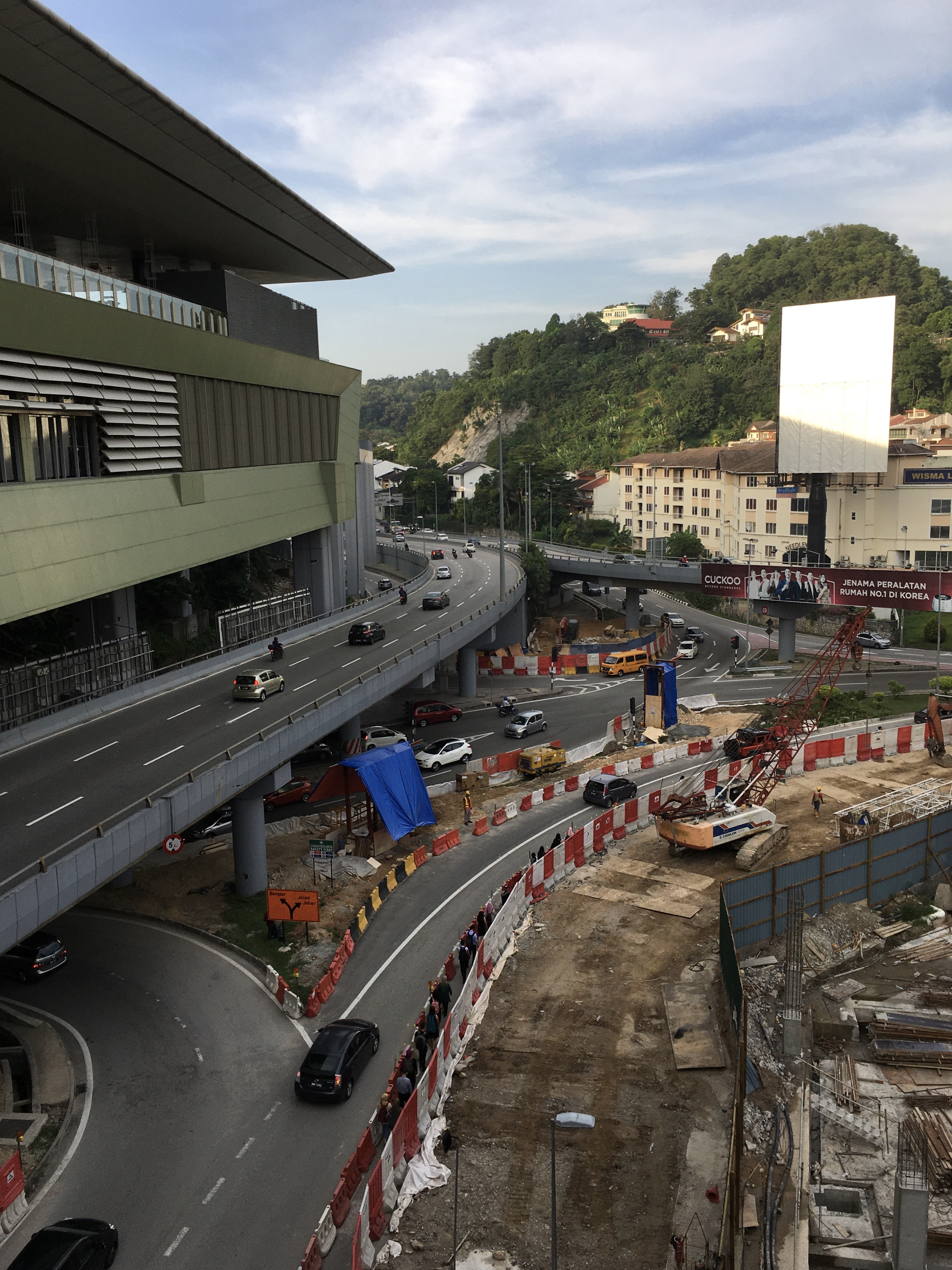
Maarof Interchange

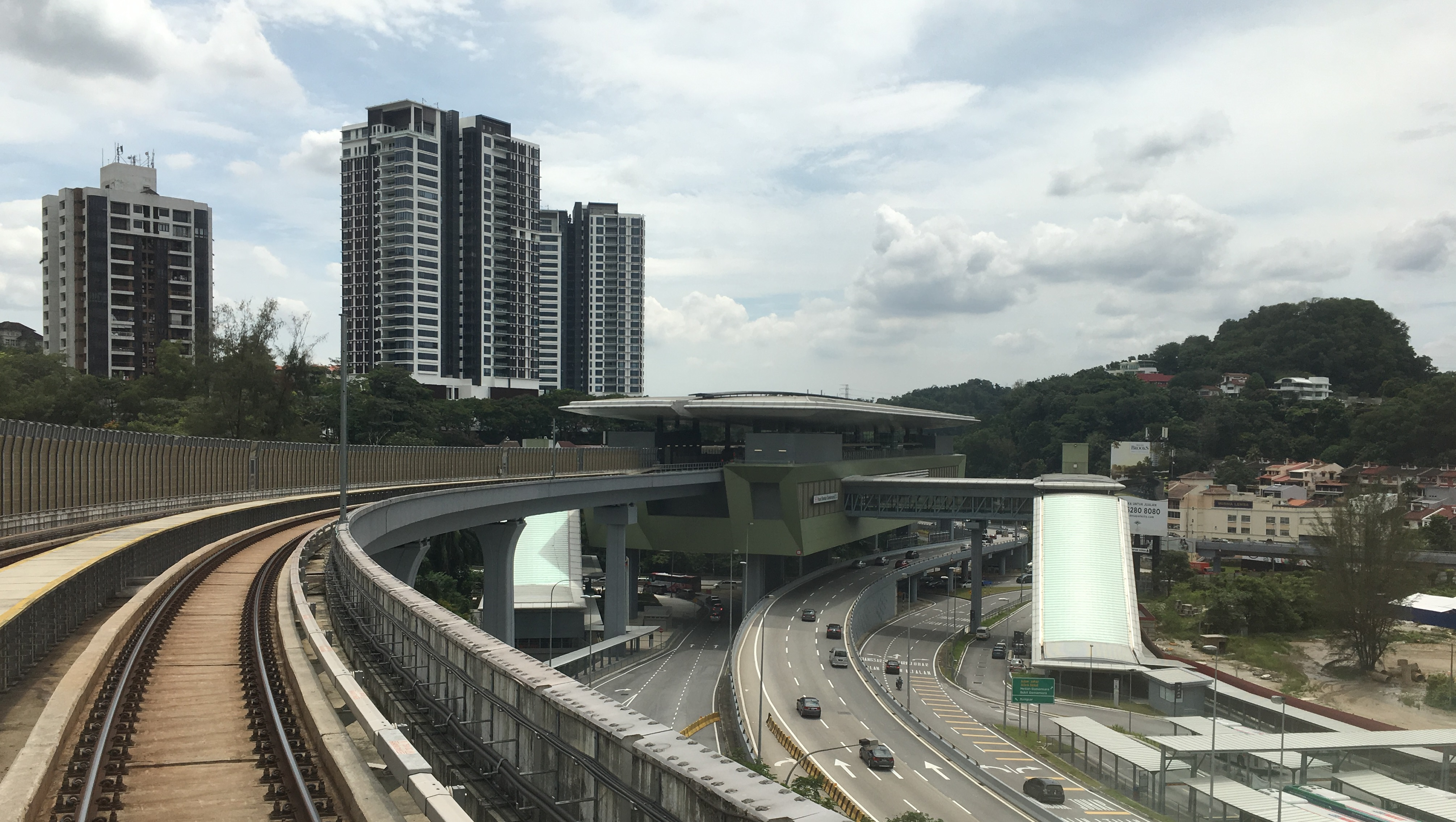
Pusat Bandar Damansara MRT station

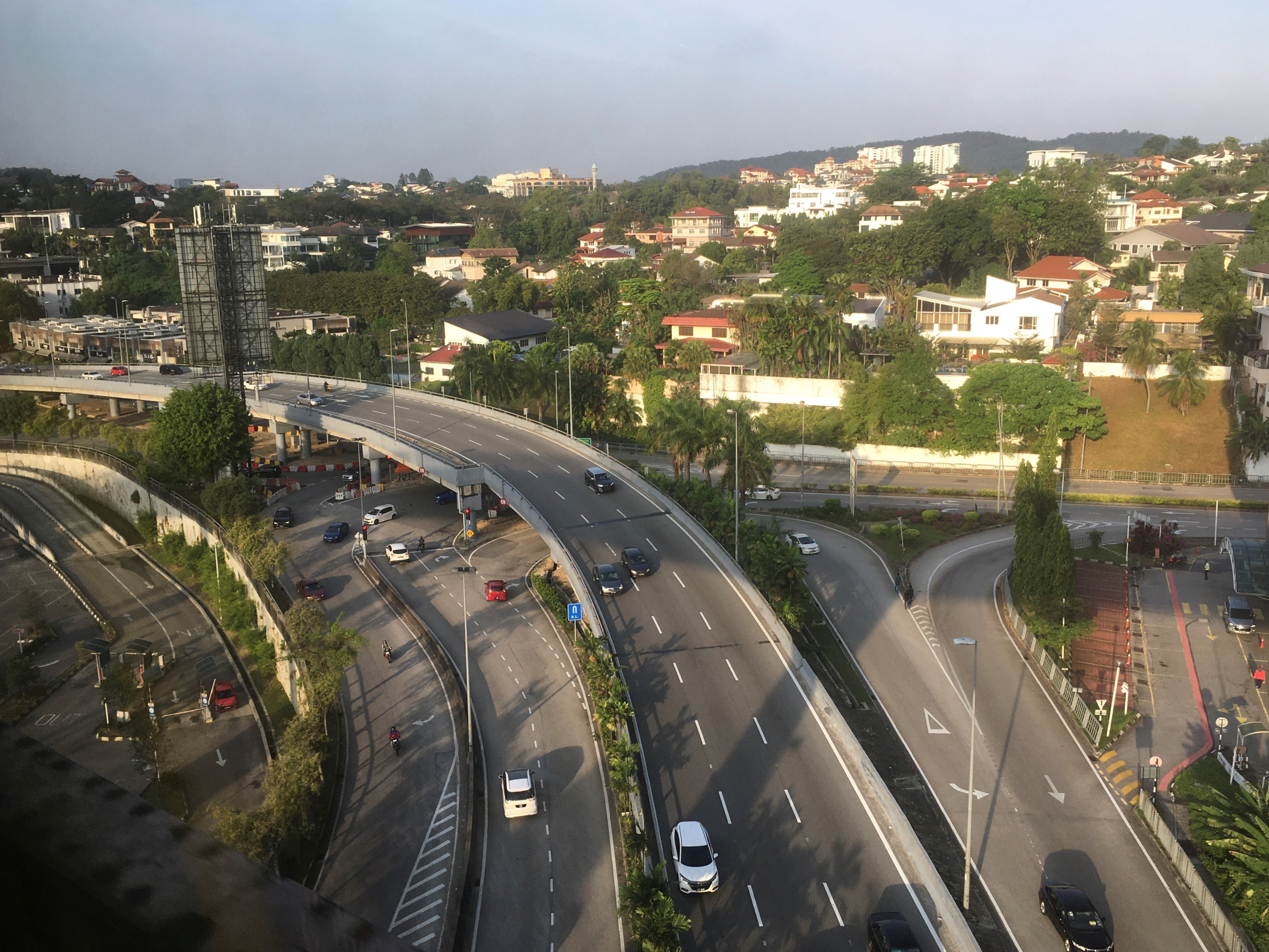
Semantan Interchange

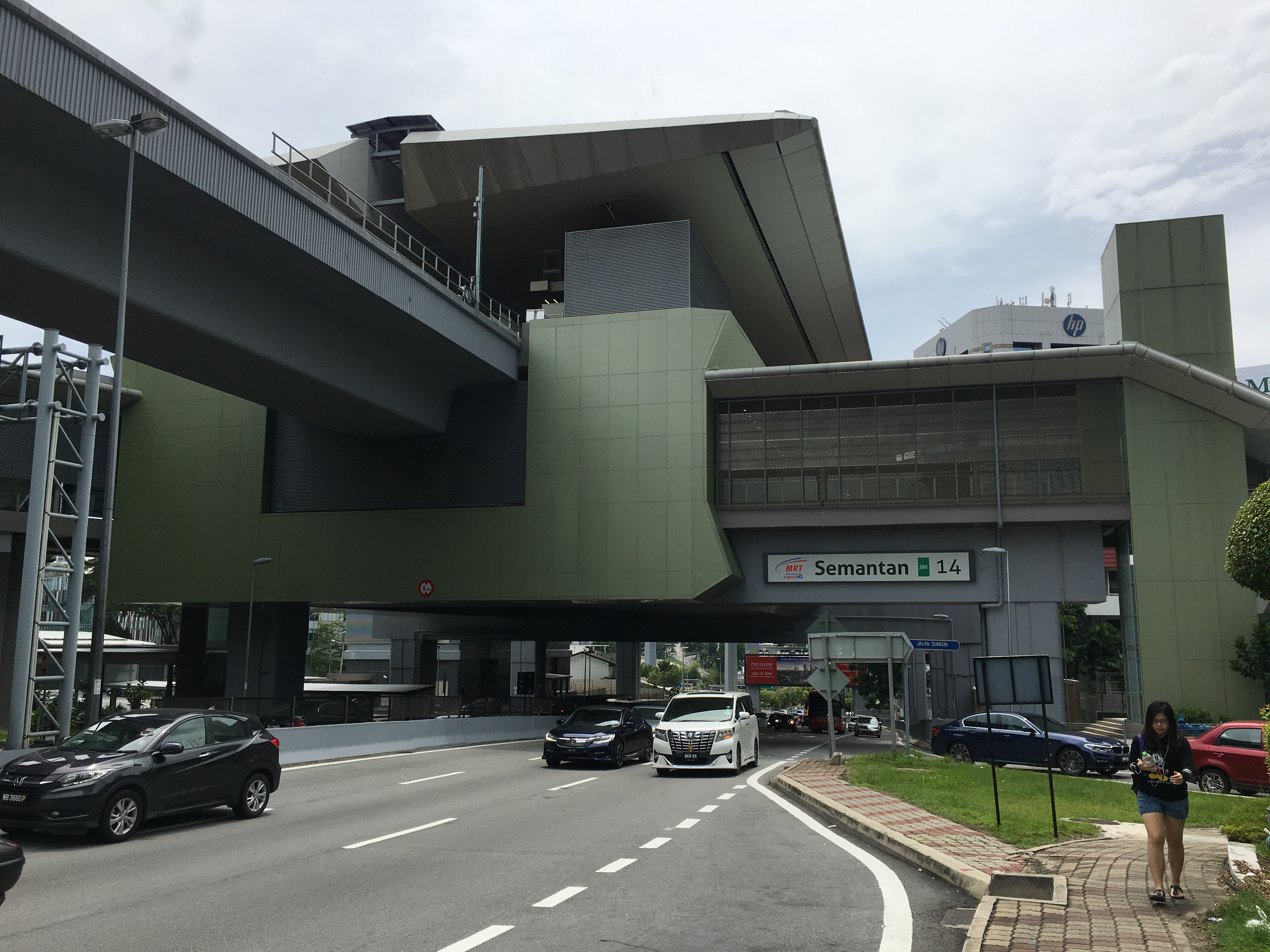
Semantan MRT station

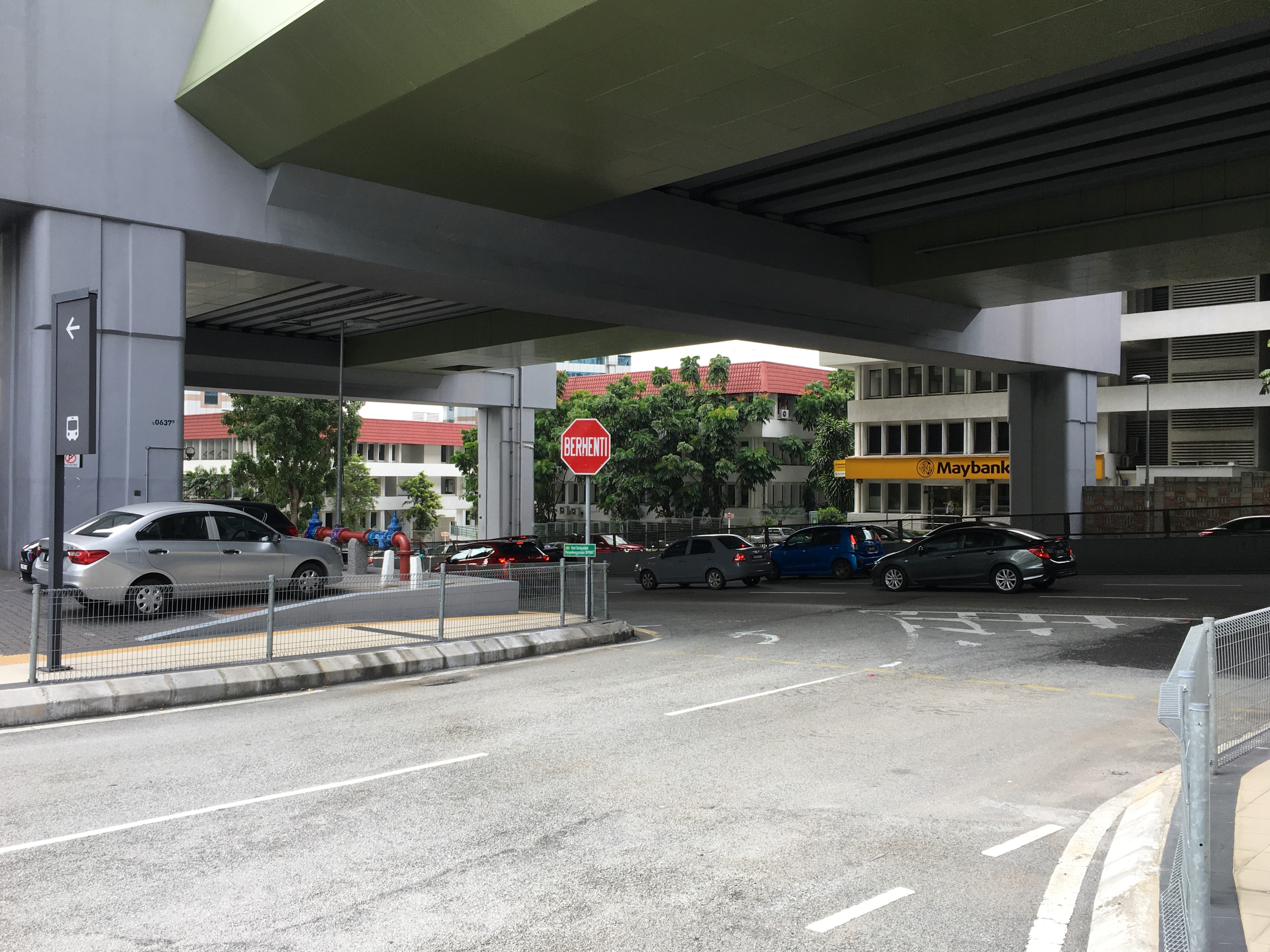
Jalan Damansara Endah Exit

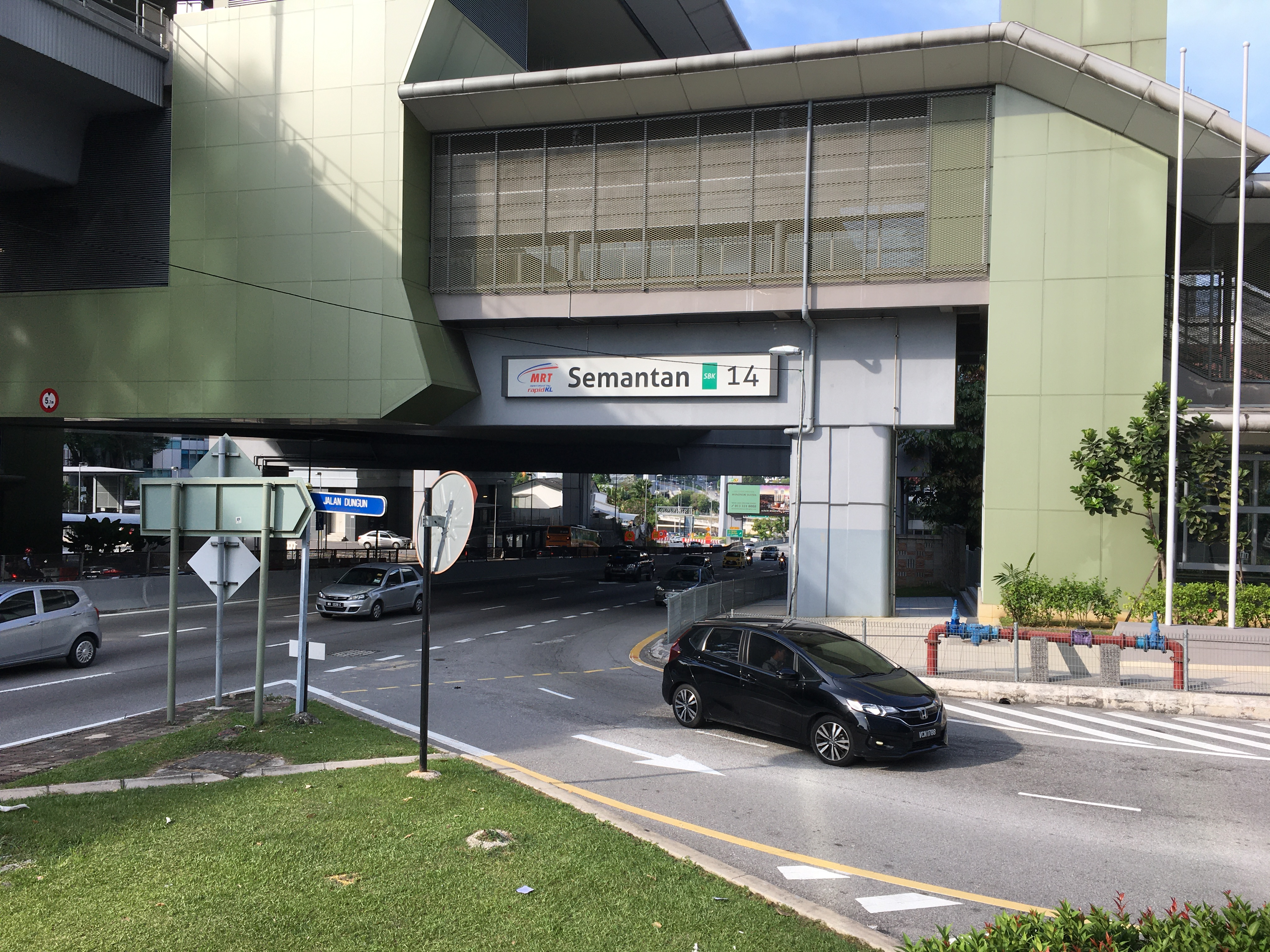
Jalan Dungun Exit

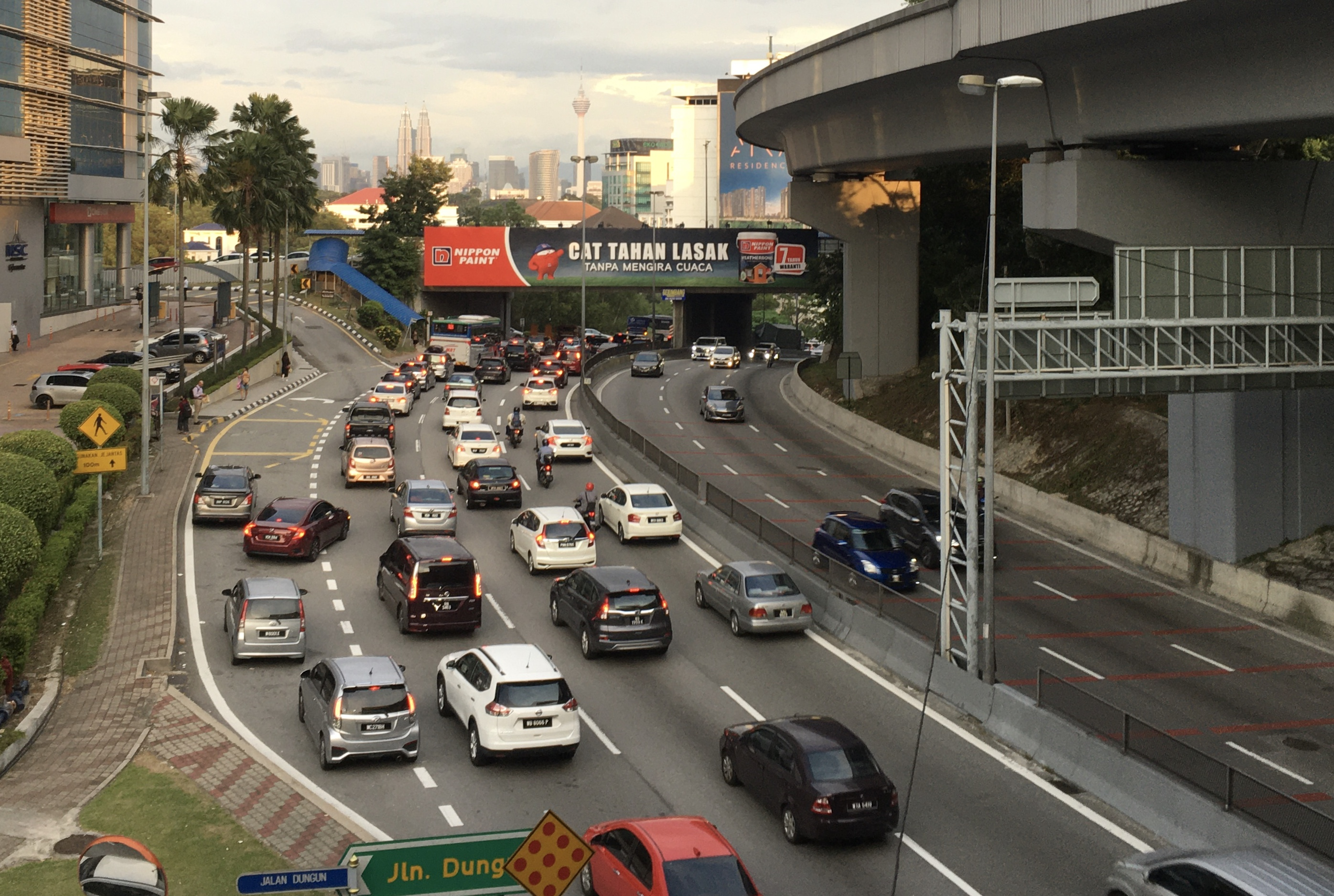
Changkat Semantan Underpass Exit

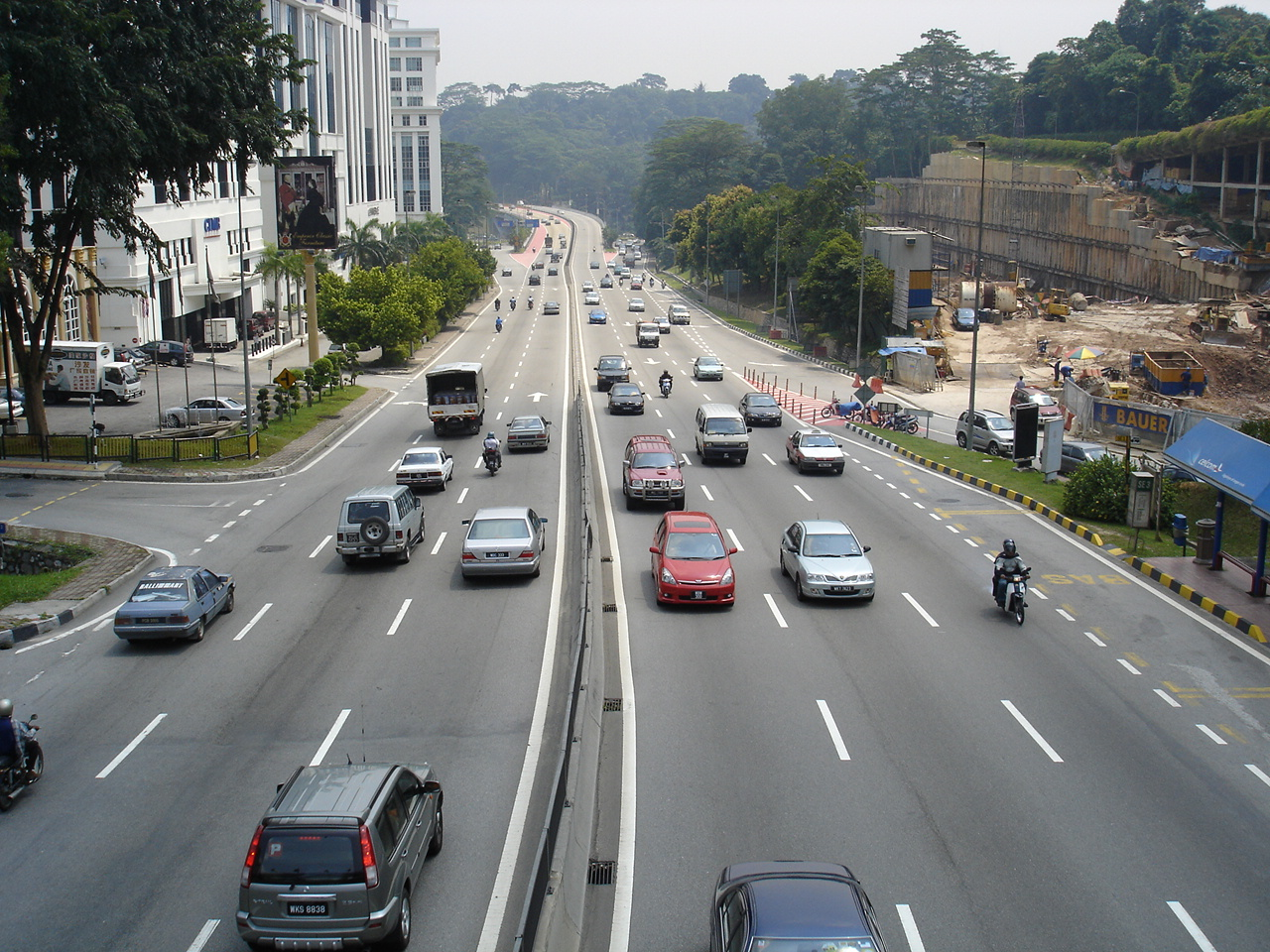
Wisma ELM in 2004

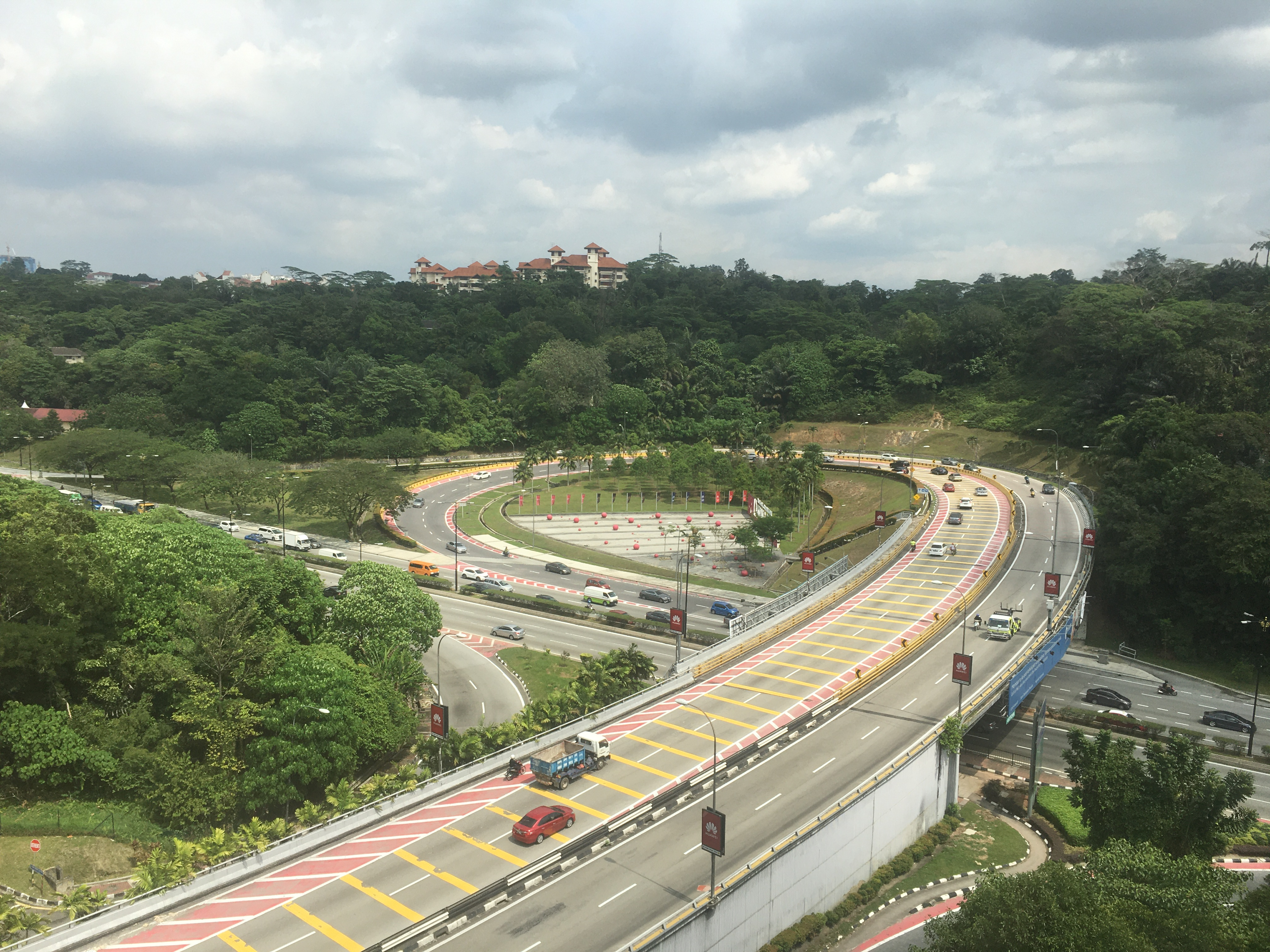
Jalan Duta-Semantan Interchange

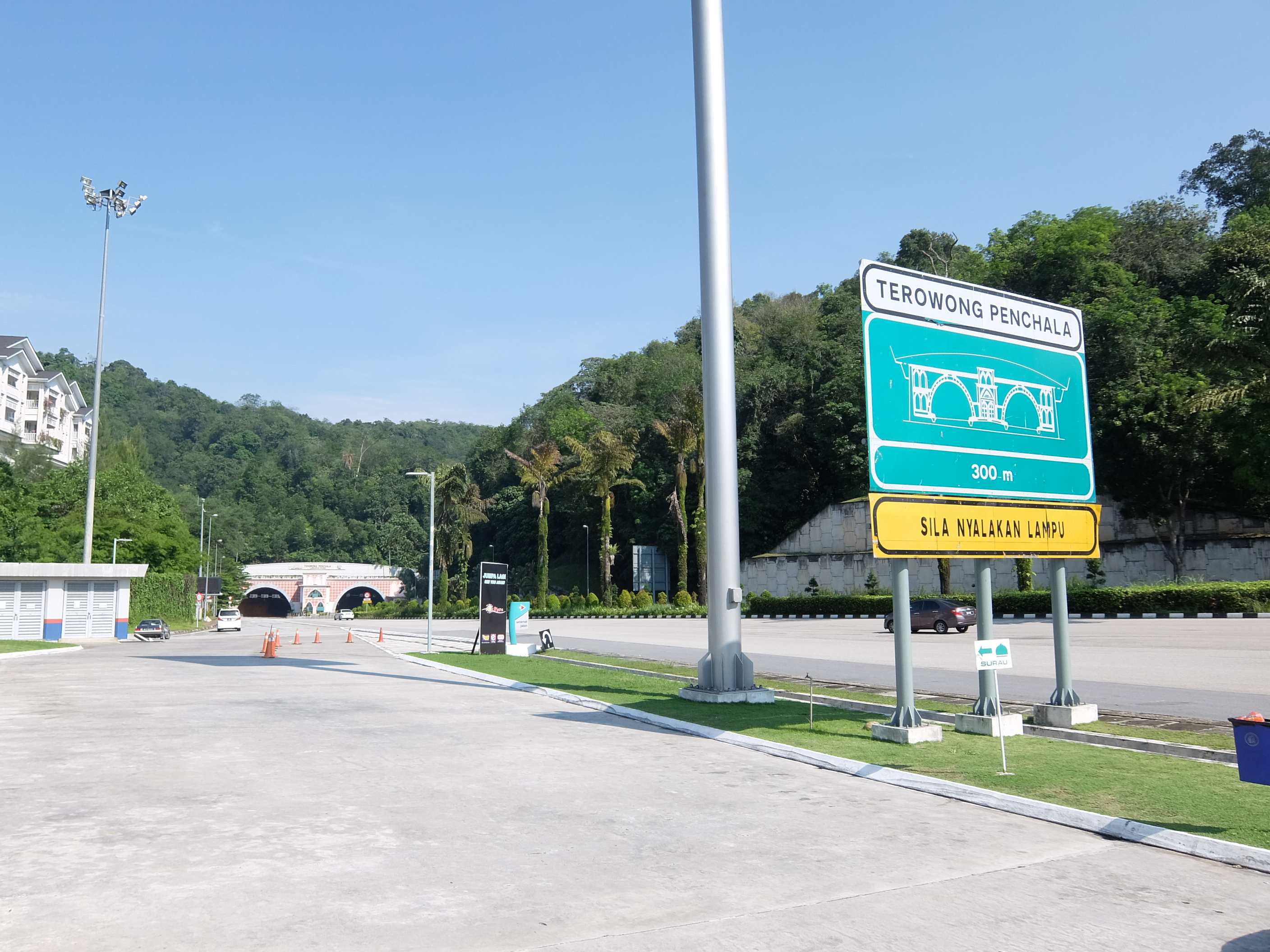
Penchala Tunnel
