= Jalan Prof Diraja Ungku Aziz =

Road in Petaling Jaya, Malaysia

- Jalan Universiti (before December 2020)

Route information
- Existed: 1960–present
- History: Completed in 1961

Major junctions
- West end: Bulatan Rothmans roundabout
- Jalan Harapan; Jalan Semangat; Jalan Dato' Abu Bakar; Jalan Kemajuan; Jalan Bukit; FT 2 Federal Highway
- Southeast end: Jalan Gasing interchange FT 2 Federal Highway

Location
- Country: Malaysia
- Primary destinations: International Islamic University Malaysia; University of Malaya; University of Malaya Medical Centre; Petaling Jaya New Town; Petaling Jaya Old Town

Highway system
- Highways in Malaysia; Expressways; Federal; State

Jalan Prof Diraja Ungku Aziz, previously as Jalan Universiti, is a major road in Petaling Jaya city, Selangor, Malaysia. It is the first dual-carriageway road built in Malaysia since independence. On 31 December 2020, the authorities announced plans to rename the road to Jalan Prof Diraja Ungku Aziz in honour of the late economist Ungku Abdul Aziz.

== Landmarks ==
- British American Tobacco factory
- Bulatan Rothmans roundabout
- Sin Chew Daily press centre
- 13th Residential College of the University of Malaya, formerly IIAM Petaling Jaya campus
- Pharmaceutical Services Division, Ministry of Health Malaysia
- National Pharmacy Regulatory Agency (NPRA), Ministry of Health Malaysia
- Jaya One
- Bulatan Universiti roundabout
- University of Malaya
- University of Malaya Medical Centre (UMMC)
- Old EPF building

== List of junctions ==
km	Exit	Junctions	To	Remarks
		Bulatan Rothmans	North; Jalan Harapan; Section —- until -- South; Jalan 19/1 Southeast; Jalan Semangat; Section 1 until 14; Petaling Jaya New Town (Section --)	Cross-junction (since 2011)
		Sin Chew Daily press centre	Sin Chew Daily press centre	
		Jalan 17/21	North; Jalan 17/21; Section 17	
		Jalan 17/1	North; Jalan 17/1; Section 17	T-junctions
		National Pharmaceutical Control Bureau (NPCB), Ministry of Health Malaysia	National Pharmaceutical Control Bureau (NPCB), Ministry of Health Malaysia	
		Pharmaceutical Services Division, Ministry of Health Malaysia	Pharmaceutical Services Division, Ministry of Health Malaysia	
		International Islamic University Malaysia (IIAM) Petaling Jaya campus	International Islamic University Malaysia (IIAM) Petaling Jaya campus	
		Bulatan Universiti	North; Jalan Dato' Abu Bakar (Jalan 16/1); Damansara; Taman Tun Dr Ismail South; Jalan Kemajuan; Section 1 until 14; Petaling Jaya New Town (Section --)	Diamond interchange
		INTAN	Institut Tadbiran Awam Negara (INTAN); Esso; Petronas; Shell	Southeast bound
		University Malaya	Northeast; Lingkungan Budi; Universiti Malaya	T-junctions
		University Malaya Medical Centre	Southwest; Jalan Bukit; Petaling Jaya New Town (Section --); FT 2 Federal Highway; Subang Jaya; Shah Alam; Klang Northeast; University Malaya Medical Centre	Junctions
		University Malaya Medical Centre		No entry
		Jalan Templer-Federal Highway	FT 2 Federal Highway Northeast; Kuala Lumpur	Half diamond interchange
			South; Jalan Gasing; Section -— until -- Petaling Jaya Old Town (Section --)	
