= Penchala Tunnel =

Road tunnel in Kuala Lumpur, Malaysia

Coordinates: 3.1647602°N 101.6360446°E

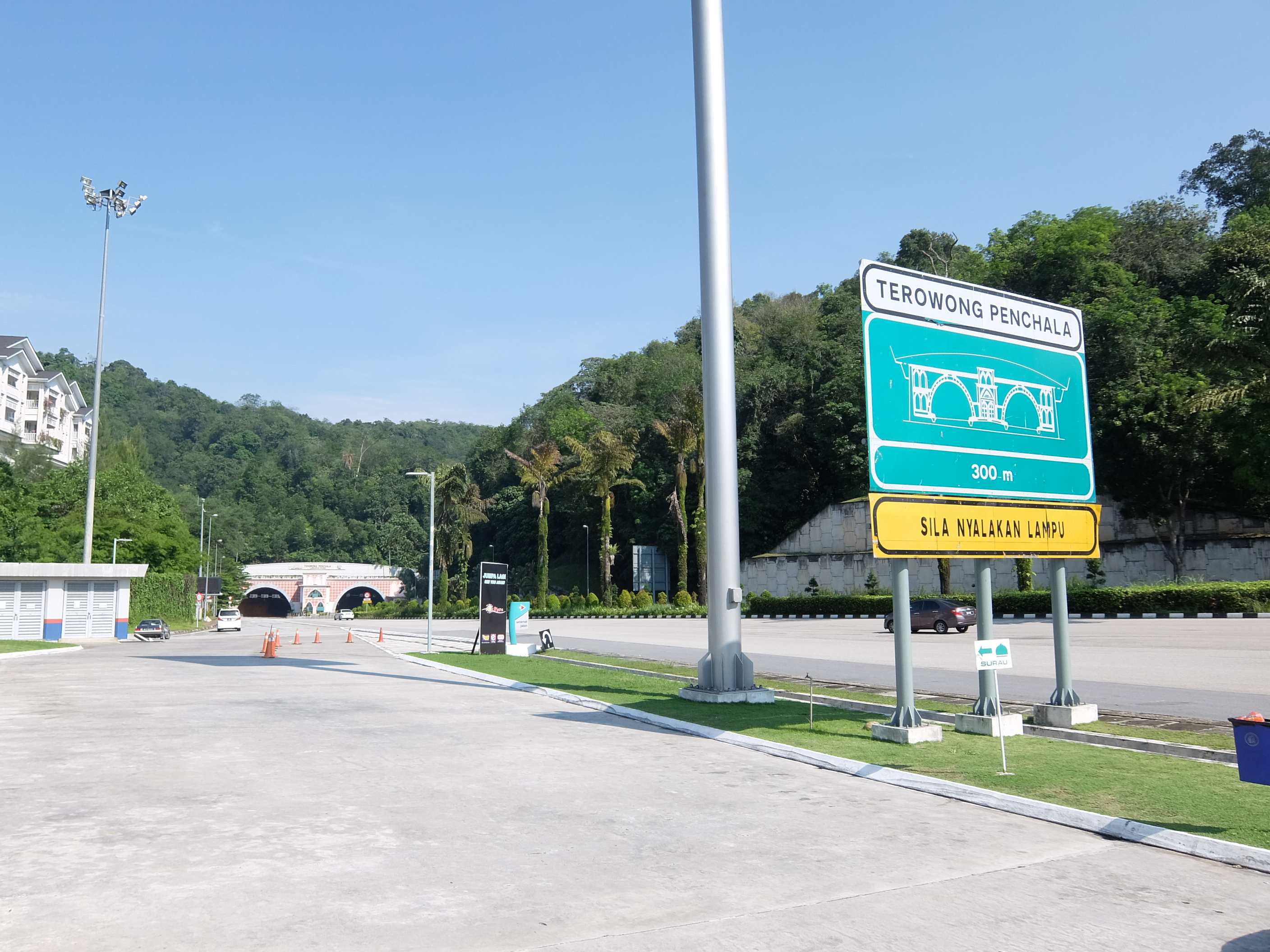
- Penchala Tunnel
- Interactive map of Penchala Tunnel

Overview
- Location: Kuala Lumpur, Malaysia
- Status: Operational
- Route: Sprint Expressway

Operation
- Work began: 2002
- Constructed: Gamuda Berhad
- Opened: August 2004
- Owner: Malaysian Highway Authority (LLM)
- Operator: Sistem Penyuraian Trafik KL Barat Sdn Bhd (Sprint)

Technical
- Length: 700 m (2,300 ft)
- Operating speed: 90 km/h

The Penchala Tunnel is a highway tunnel in Kuala Lumpur, Malaysia. Part of the Sprint Expressway, the tunnel leads motorists to TTDI, Damansara–Puchong Expressway, Kampung Sungai Penchala and Mont Kiara. Opened in August 2004, the tunnel is 700 metres long and is the widest highway tunnel in the country.

A twin-tubed tunnel, it was constructed using the rock-explosion method due to the unstable rock condition (limestones) at the tunnel site.

The tunnel's features includes a linear heat detector, gas detectors, adaptive lighting and ventilation fans and cross-passages for escape during emergencies.
