= SJK(C) Damansara =

SJK (C) Damansara
- 白沙罗华小

Location
- Jalan Tropicana Utara, Tropicana; Petaling Jaya, Selangor 47410; Malaysia
- 3°8′15.42″N 101°35′58.78″E

Information
- School type: Public, primary school
- Founded: 1930; 96 years ago
- Years taught: Primary 1 - Primary 6
- Age range: 7 to 12
- Language: Chinese
- Website: sjkcdamansara.edu.my

Sekolah Jenis Kebangsaan (Cina) Damansara (Chinese: 白沙罗华小; abbreviated: SJK(C) Damansara) is a primary school in Damansara, Petaling Jaya, Selangor, Malaysia.It was the first national primary school in Section 17, Petaling Jaya, and one of the oldest in Malaysia.

== History ==
The school was founded in 1930 using the name "Hua Qiao Xue Xiao", (Chinese: 华侨学校). On March 3, 1953, the school experienced its first ever move, from Damansara Utama to Damansara, Section 17. In 1976, the school built 2 new classrooms from its original 4 to 6 classrooms in its school. On May 1, 1982, the school built a brand new block that included 27 classrooms from its three floors, with one floor having 9 classrooms. In June 1987, the school built 11 new classrooms. On September 10, 1989, the school built a brand new block that included a library, a resource center, a music room and a canteen. In 1998, the school implemented a comprehensive center in its school. In 1999, the board of directors wanted to move the school to another location due to the Sprint Expressway. On January 3, 2001, the school shared with another school called SJK(C) Puay Chai 2 until the new area on where the school would be situated. On September 19, 2001, the school officially moved to PJU 3, near Tropicana Golf and Country Resort following the Federal Government of Malaysia that it was no longer a place for "conducive learning environment" because of traffic congestion and noise pollution from the neighbouring Sprint Expressway. In 2002, the school did a greenify project on its gardens. In 2006, the board of directors and the parents-teacher association worked together to install a roof over the assembly area. In 2007, the school did a beautify project on its gardens. In 2009, the school officially became one of the first "digital school" in Selangor. In 2011, the school carried out restoration and expansion on the football pitch and added sunshades to the assembly area. In 2013, the school built a temporary canteen next to the football field, and added large fans at the assembly area. On August 13, 2016, the schools PTA, parents, teachers and students worked together to organize a large-scale cleaning and painting activity for the school, giving the campus a brand new look.
