= Tun Abdul Aziz Mosque =

Mosque in Petaling Jaya, Selangor, Malaysia

- Masjid Tun Abdul Aziz
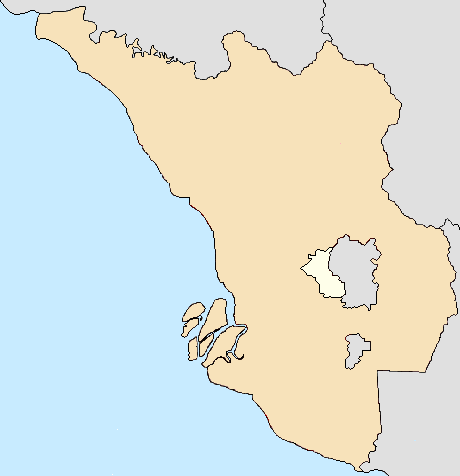
- Location within Petaling Jaya

Location
- Location: Petaling Jaya, Selangor, Malaysia
- Interactive map of Tun Abdul Aziz Mosque
- Coordinates: 3.1122°N 101.6355°E

Architecture
- Type: mosque
- Minaret: 1

The Tun Abdul Aziz Mosque or Masjid Tun Abdul Aziz or also known as Masjid Bulat (Round Mosque) is a mosque in Petaling Jaya, Selangor, Malaysia. The mosque is located in Section 14 at the junctions between Jalan Semangat and Jalan Dato' Abdul Aziz. The mosque was constructed between 1975 and 1977, and is in the Modernist style. The mosque was officially opened on 31 July 1977 by the Almarhum Sultan Salahuddin Abdul Aziz Shah of Selangor. It was named after Tun Abdul Aziz Abdul Majid, a former Menteri Besar (Chief Minister) of Selangor from 1955 to 1956 and also the first Chief Secretary to the Government from 1957 to 1964 and then Yang di-Pertua Negeri (Governor) of Malacca from 1971 to 1975.

== See also ==
- Islam in Malaysia
