= Kampung Sungai Penchala =

Village in Kuala Lumpur, Malaysia

Coordinates: 3.1635765°N 101.6150917°E

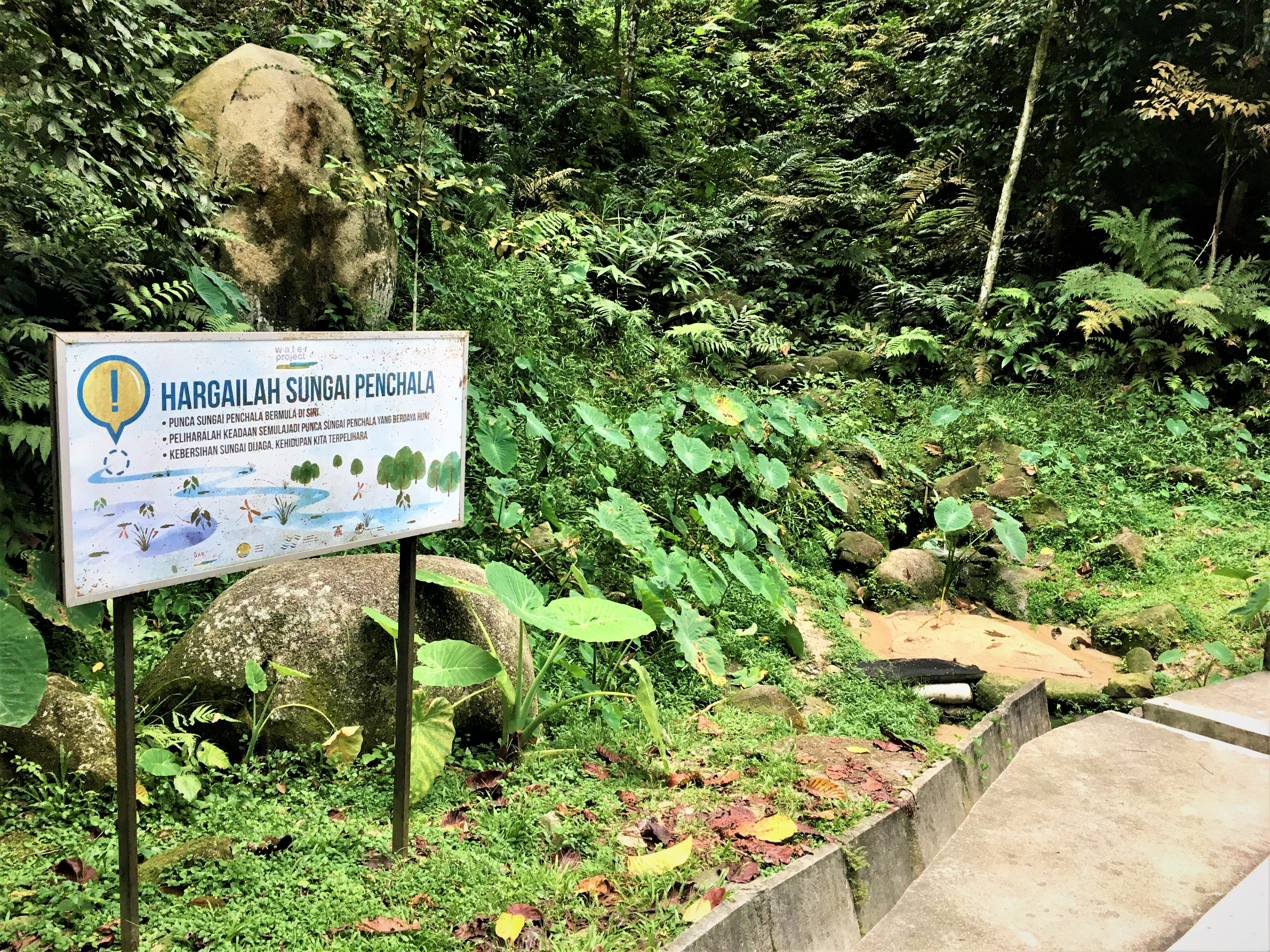
Penchala river

Kampung Sungai Penchala is a small Malay village in the Segambut constituency in northwestern Kuala Lumpur, Malaysia, with the postcode 60000 KUALA LUMPUR, lying along the Federal Territory–Selangor border. This village is next to Taman Tun Dr Ismail in Kuala Lumpur, which also shares the same 60000 KUALA LUMPUR postcode, and adjacent to Mutiara Damansara and Bandar Utama that were once part of a large oil palm plantation across the interstate border.

Despite the fact that the Government has gazetted Kampung Sungai Penchala as one of the Malay Reserve lands in Kuala Lumpur, this village is being actively developed and is arguably the most rapidly developed areas in the past 10 years with many developments having taken place.

== Access ==
In 1998, the Damansara–Puchong Expressway (LDP) was opened on the village's western border, connecting Kampung Sungai Penchala to Bandar Sri Damansara, Sungai Buloh, Kepong and Gombak through the MRR2 to the north and to Damansara Utama, Damansara Jaya, SS2 and Kelana Jaya to the south.

In 2004, the SPRINT Highway was opened, intersecting with the aforementioned LDP just outside this village. Kampung Sungai Penchala is hence connected to downtown Kuala Lumpur and Mont Kiara/Sri Hartamas via the Penchala Tunnel. It is also 3 minutes' drive to the Duta–Ulu Klang Expressway (DUKE) which serves as a shortcut to Gombak, Ampang and Ulu Kelang.

Five minutes' away is the New Klang Valley Expressway (NKVE), part of the PLUS system, with connections to Ipoh to the north and Shah Alam, Bukit Raja and Klang to the west.

In terms of public transportation, the village is accessible from MRT Mutiara Damansara.

== Features ==
Kampung Sungai Penchala has two mosques; Masjid Al-Hidayah and Masjid Jamek Tengku Abdul Aziz Shah. The village has an ethnic Malay population made up of people hailing from a number of regions from Indonesia, such as Kerinchi, Boyan or Bawean, Java, and Minangkabau who have long lived in the village. Kampung Sungai Penchala is further broken down into a number of smaller villages, namely:

- Kampung Penchala Indah
- Kampung Palimbayan
- Kampung Palimbayan Indah

There is a weekly night market (pasar malam) every Wednesday evening at the car park near the Masjid Jamek Tengku Abdul Aziz Shah mosque.
