= Imago Jaya =

Supermarket in Petaling, Selangor, Malaysia

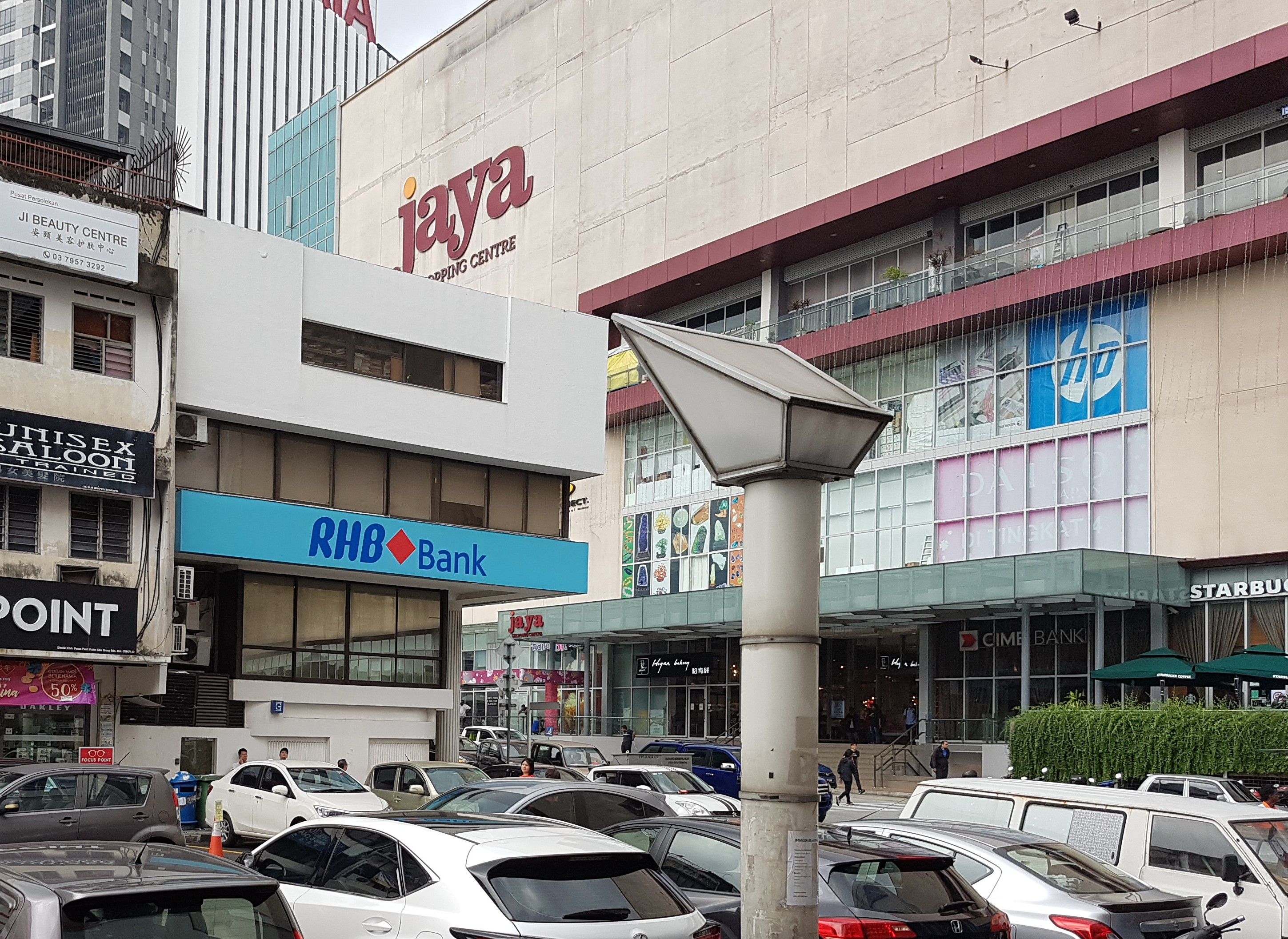
- Exterior of Jaya Shopping Centre

General information
- Status: Completed
- Type: Shopping center and supermarkets
- Location: Section 14, Petaling Jaya, Selangor, Malaysia
- Construction started: 1969 (original building); 2009 (current, as Jaya Shopping Centre)
- Completed: 1974 (original building); 2014 (current, as Jaya Shopping Centre)

Website
- https://imagojaya.my/

Imago Jaya is a shopping mall in Petaling Jaya, Selangor, Malaysia. Originally known as Jaya Supermarket it was built in 1974, and was one of the first malls in Petaling Jaya, and originally lasted until its demolition and subsequent accidental collapse in 2009. A new shopping complex was built on the same site, renamed as Jaya Shopping Centre.

The original building had four storeys of retail units, five storeys of office units and four storeys of car-parks. The building was earmarked for redevelopment, in which it would be demolished and rebuilt as a namesake shopping centre, with additional loading bays, access roads and security in the late 2000s.

== Incidents ==
=== Collapse ===
On 28 May 2009, during the active structural teardown of the original supermarket complex, a major section of the remaining building suffered an accidental progressive collapse. The structural failure resulted in the deaths of seven Indonesian construction workers who were trapped beneath the falling concrete slabs, and it left several others injured within the active commercial zone.

A subsequent ministerial investigative committee determined that the fatal collapse was caused by severe execution errors and a lack of proper engineering oversight during the delicate demolition sequence. The findings triggered widespread public debate regarding structural safety protocols in urban areas, ultimately prompting the Malaysian government to enforce significantly stricter regulations, mandatory forensic structural assessments, and standardized code compliance guidelines for all subsequent commercial demolition contracts nationwide.

== Tenants ==
The current tenants of Imago Jaya include:

Jaya Grocer

TGV Cinemas

Chili's

Texas Chicken

Machines

Original Classic

== Buyout ==
In March 2025, Asian Pac Holdings Bhd's (known for Imago Mall in Kota Kinabalu) subsidiary Primadana Utama Sdn Bhd bought Jaya Shopping Centre for RM100,000,000 from its original owners, Jaya Section Fourteen Sdn Bhd. Since then, the mall has been renamed as Imago Jaya.
