= Surian MRT station =

MRT station in Petaling Jaya, Selangor, Malaysia

KG07 Surian – IOI Mall Damansara
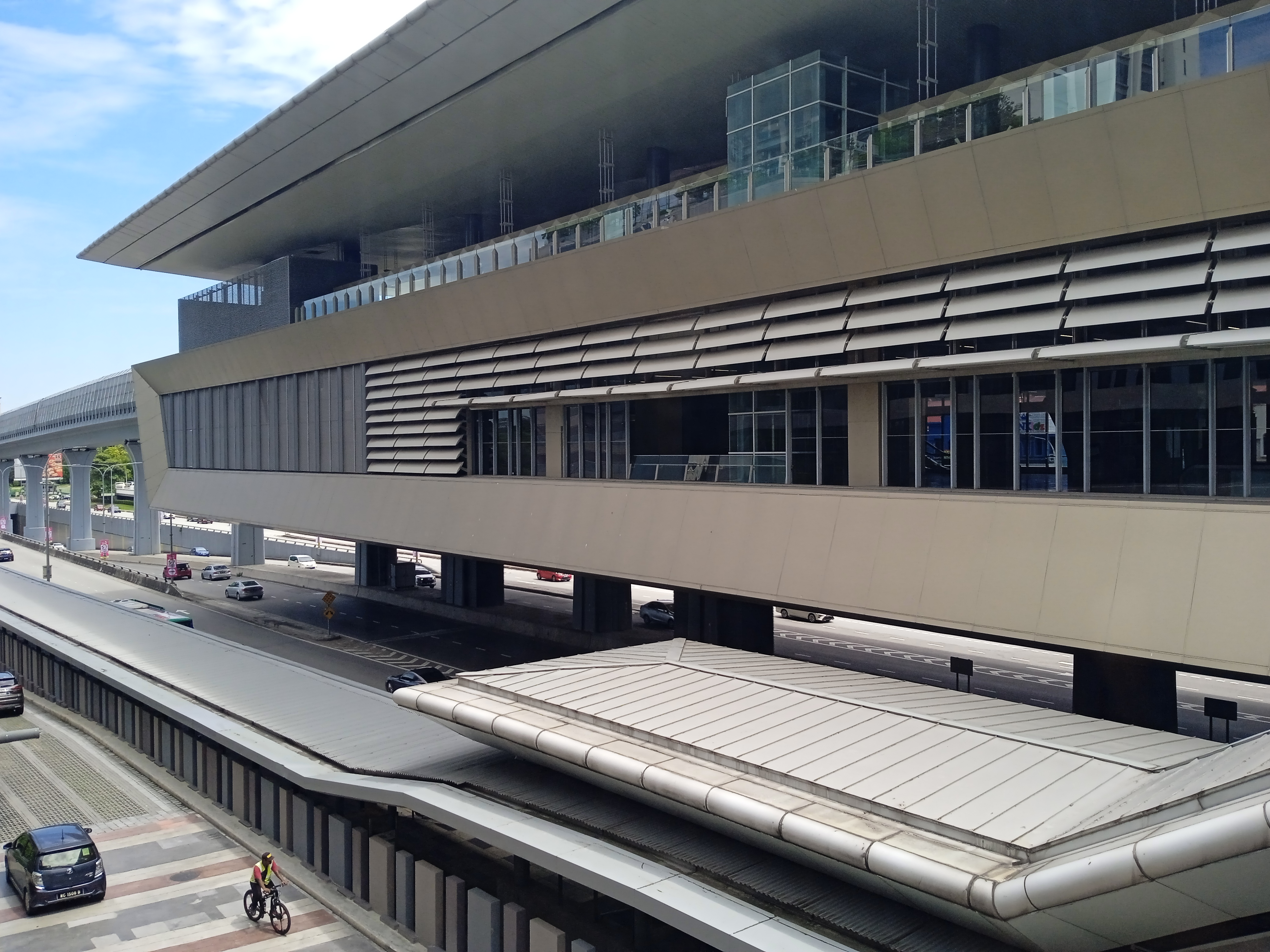
- Perspective view of the station

General information
- Other names: Malay: سوريان (Jawi); Chinese: 苏丽雅; Tamil: சூரியன்
- Location: Persiaran Surian, Kota Damansara, PJU5, 47410 Petaling Jaya; Selangor; Malaysia
- Coordinates: 3°8′58.66″N 101°35′36.93″E
- System: Rapid KL
- Owner: MRT Corp
- Operator: Rapid Rail
- Line: 9 Kajang Line
- Platforms: 2 side platforms
- Tracks: 2

Construction
- Structure type: Elevated
- Parking: Not available
- Cycle facilities: Yes. 16 bicycle bays.

Other information
- Station code: KG07

History
- Opened: 16 December 2016
- Former names: Dataran Sunway

Services
Preceding station		Following station
Kota Damansara towards Kwasa Damansara	Kajang Line	Mutiara Damansara towards Kajang
Location

The Surian MRT station or Surian–IOI Mall Damansara MRT station under the station naming rights programme, is a mass rapid transit (MRT) station serving the suburb of Kota Damansara in Petaling Jaya, Selangor, Malaysia. It is one of the stations on the MRT Kajang Line. The station is named after Persiaran Surian, the road above which the station was built. The station was opened on 16 December 2016 under Phase One operations of the MRT Kajang Line (then known as the MRT Sungai Buloh-Kajang Line).

The station is located near the Dataran Sunway commercial area in Kota Damansara, where the Sunway Giza Shopping Centre, Sunway Nexis and many other shops are located.

== Station Features ==
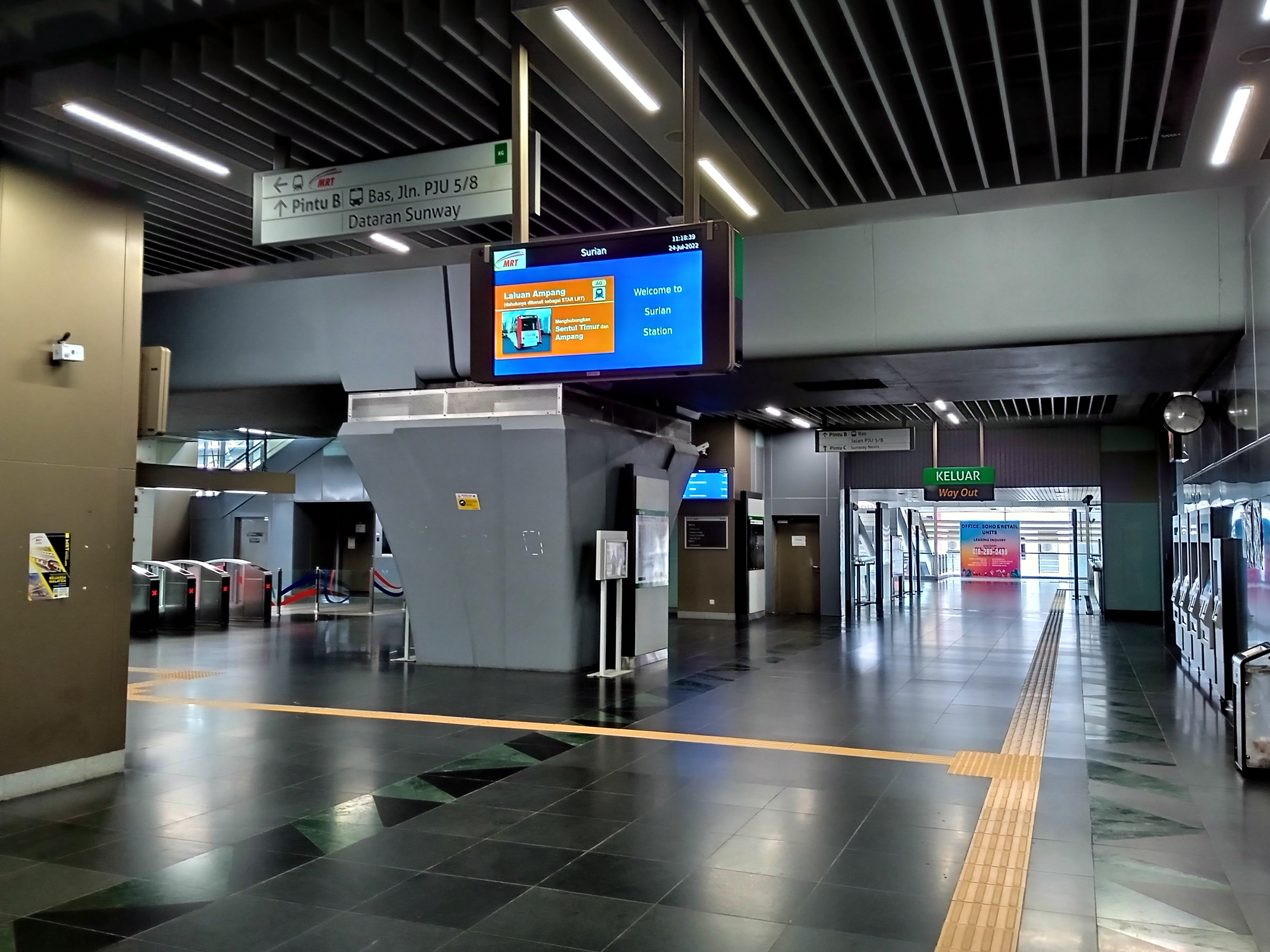
Station concourse and faregates from Entrance A

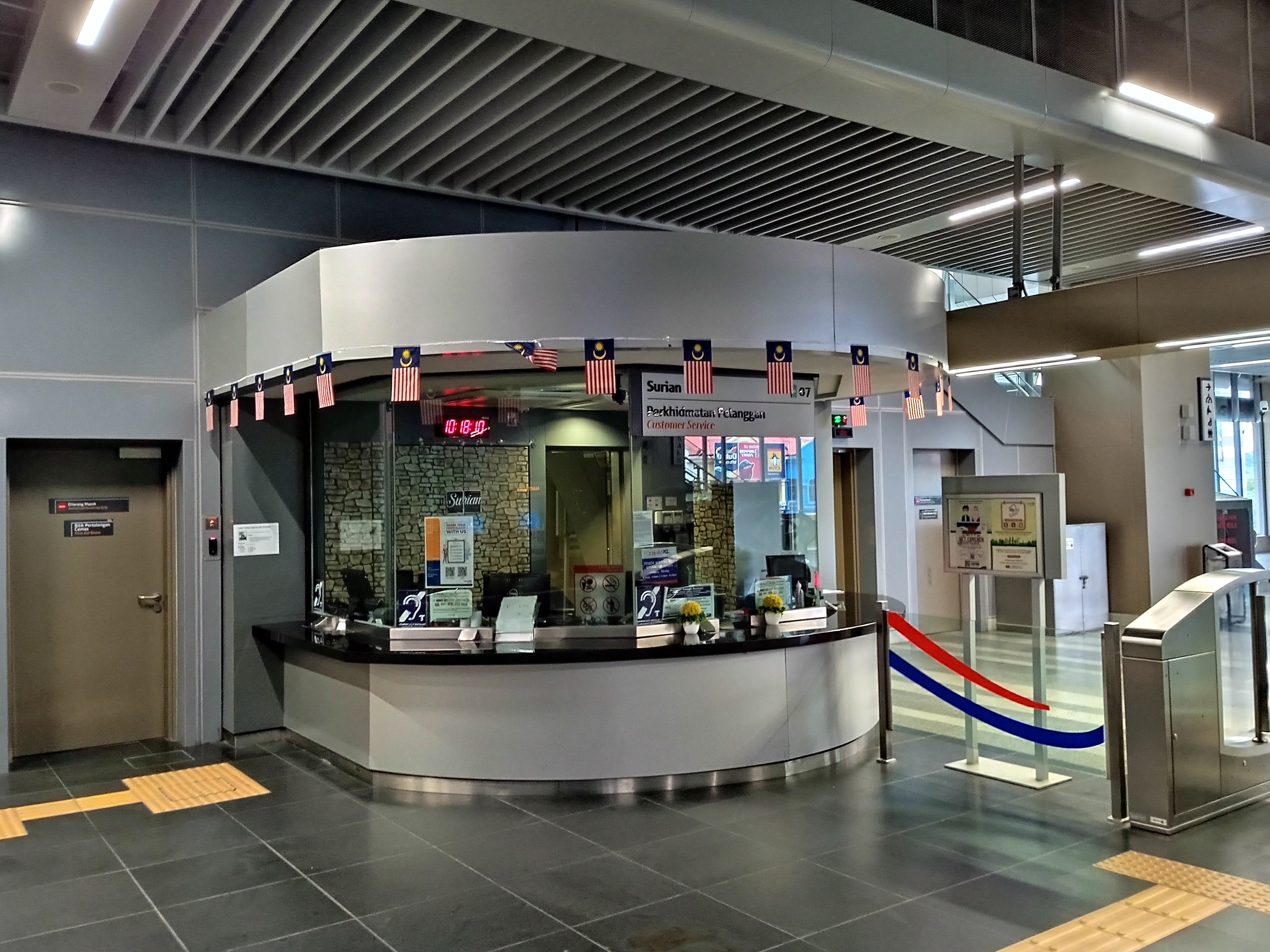
Customer service office.

The station adopts the standard elevated station design for the MRT Kajang Line, with two side platforms above the concourse level. The station is located directly above Persiaran Surian, with its supporting columns sited along the median of the road.

The station is located next to the Dataran Sunway commercial area or Seksyen PJU5 of Petaling Jaya, also known as Kota Damansara. The Sunway Giza Mall is also located near the station, while Encorp Strand Mall and Giant Hypermarket Kota Damansara are located about 1 km away.

=== Station layout ===
L2	Platform Level	Side platform
L2	Platform Level	Platform 1: 9 Kajang Line towards KG35 Kajang (→)
L2	Platform Level	Platform 2: 9 Kajang Line towards KG04 Kwasa Damansara (←)
L2	Platform Level	Side platform
L1	Concourse	Faregates to paid area; escalators to platforms; ticketing machines; customer service office; station control; shops; Entrance A escalator and lift from ground level to Persiaran Surian (Kwasa Damansara-bound) and pedestrian linkway to IOI Mall Damansara; Entrance B escalators and lifts from ground level to Persiaran Surian (Petaling Jaya-bound), Jalan PJU 5/8; Entrance C to elevated pedestrian walkway from Sunway Nexis.
G	Ground Level	Feeder Bus Stop, Taxi Lay-By, Kiss and Ride Lay-By

=== Exits and entrances ===
The station has three entrances. Entrance A and Entrance B are situated on both sides of Persiaran Surian. Entrance B is also accessible from Jalan PJU 5/8, which runs parallel to Persiaran Surian. Entrance C connects with the Sunway Nexis Mall, which is on the same side as Entrance B.

Another elevated pedestrian linkway has also been constructed to connect the station's Entrance A with IOI Mall Damansara (formerly known as Tropicana Gardens Mall), a 17-acre mixed development previously developed by Tropicana Corporation Berhad and currently owned by IOI Group, on the south side of Persiaran Surian.

There are feeder bus stops, taxi lay-bys and also drop-off areas at both entrances along Persiaran Surian.

Kajang Line station
Entrance	Location	Destination	Picture
A	South side of Persiaran Surian	Feeder bus stop, taxi and private vehicle lay-by, Persiaran Damansara Indah, Sri Selangor Golf Club, Casa Indah 1 and 2 Condominiums	
B	North side of Persiaran Surian; South side of Jalan PJU 5/8; Pedestrian bridge from Sunway Nexis	Feeder bus stop, taxi and private vehicle lay-by, Dataran Sunway Commercial Area, Sunway Giza, Sunway Nexis,	
C	Sunway Nexis 1st Floor	Sunway Nexis	
IOI Mall Damansara Linkway	IOI Mall Damansara 1st Floor	IOI Mall Damansara	

== History ==
Before the station name was finalised, the station was assigned the working name Dataran Sunway MRT Station, after the Dataran Sunway commercial area.

== Bus Services ==
=== Feeder buses ===
With the opening of the MRT Kajang Line, feeder buses also began operating linking the station with several housing and industrial areas in Sunway Damansara, Tropicana and Subang. The feeder buses operate from the station's feeder bus stops adjacent to the station.

Route No.	Origin	Desitination	Via	Connecting to
T807	KG07 Surian (Entrance A)	Ara Damansara	Persiaran Damansara Indah; Persiaran Tropicana; Jalan PJU 1A/1; KJ25 Lembah Subang; Jalan Tropika Utama	T782
T808	KG07 Surian (Entrance B)	Section 11, Kota Damansara	Jalan PJU 5/1; Persiaran Mahogani	802

=== Other buses ===
Route No.	Origin	Desitination	Via
780	KJ14 KG16 Pasar Seni	Section 8, Kota Damansara	Jalan Tun Tan Cheng Lock; Jalan Tun Sambanthan (KL Sentral); Jalan Bangsar; KJ16 Bangsar; FT 2 Federal Highway; Jalan Utara; Jalan Semangat; Jalan SS 2/55; Damansara–Puchong Expressway (Bandar Utama); Persiaran Surian; KG08 Mutiara Damansara; KG07 Surian (Entrance A for Kota Damansara-bound, Entrance B for Pasar Seni-bound); KG06 Kota Damansara; Persiaran Mahogani; Jalan Pekaka
802	KJ24 Kelana Jaya	Section 11, Kota Damansara	Damansara-Puchong Expressway; Persiaran Bandar Utama; KG09 SA01 Bandar Utama; Lebuh Bandar Utama; Persiaran Surian; KG08 Mutiara Damansara; KG07 Surian (Entrance A for Kota Damansara-bound; Entrance B for Kelana Jaya-bound); Persiaran Mahogani

== Gallery ==
=== Station ===
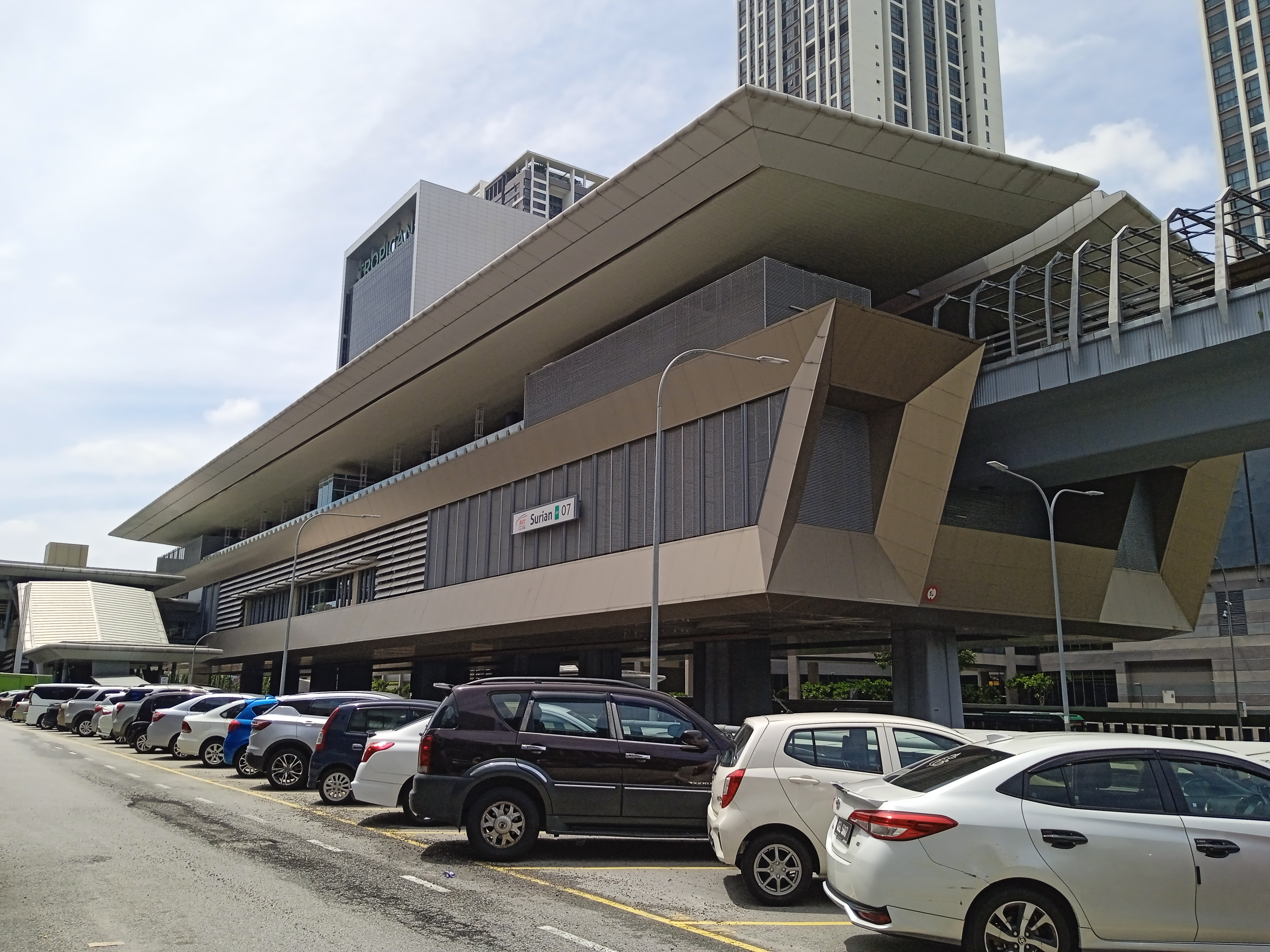
The MRT station from Jalan PJU 5/8, Dataran Sunway.

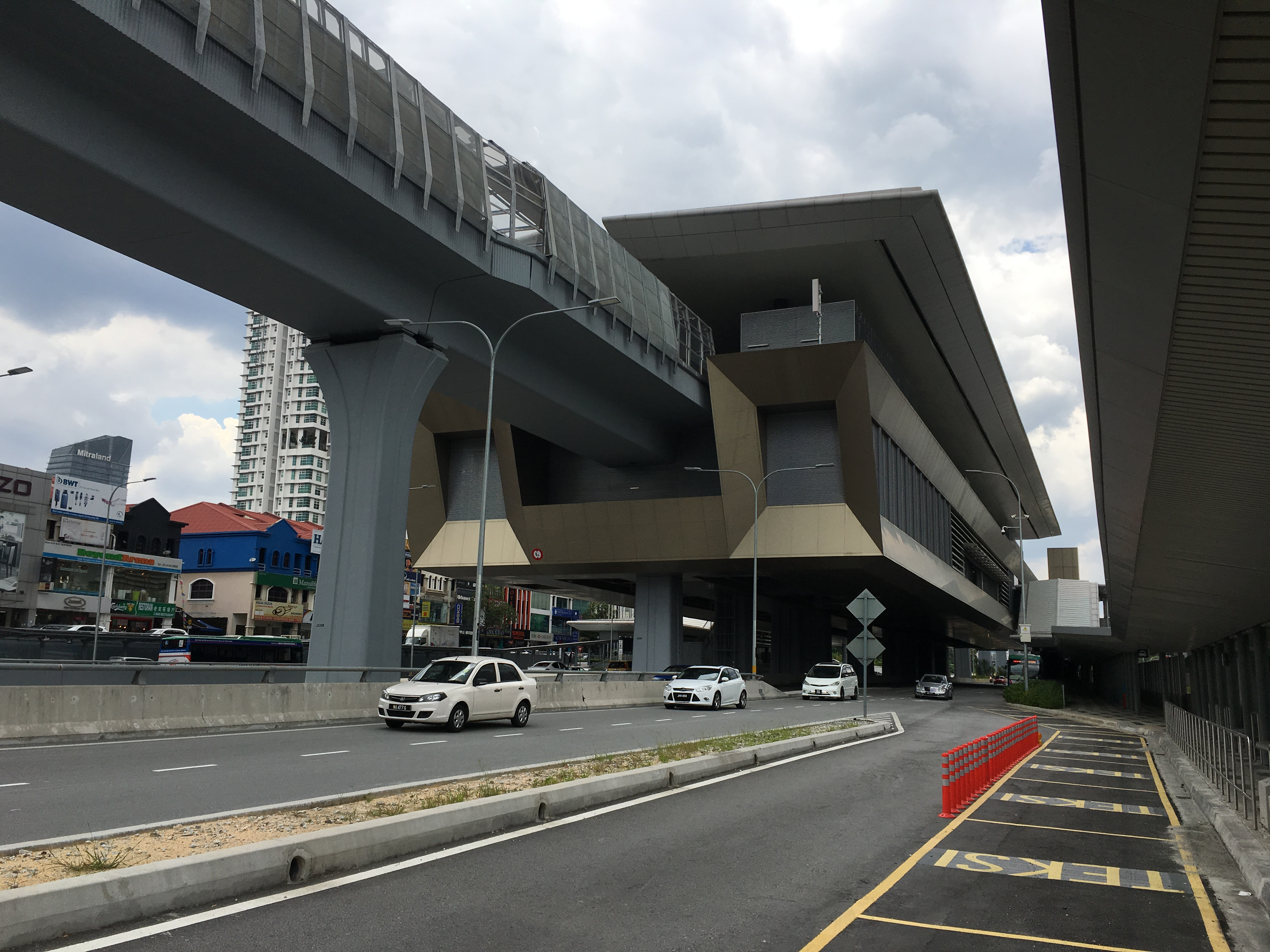
The MRT station from Persiaran Surian (Kwasa Damansara-bound).

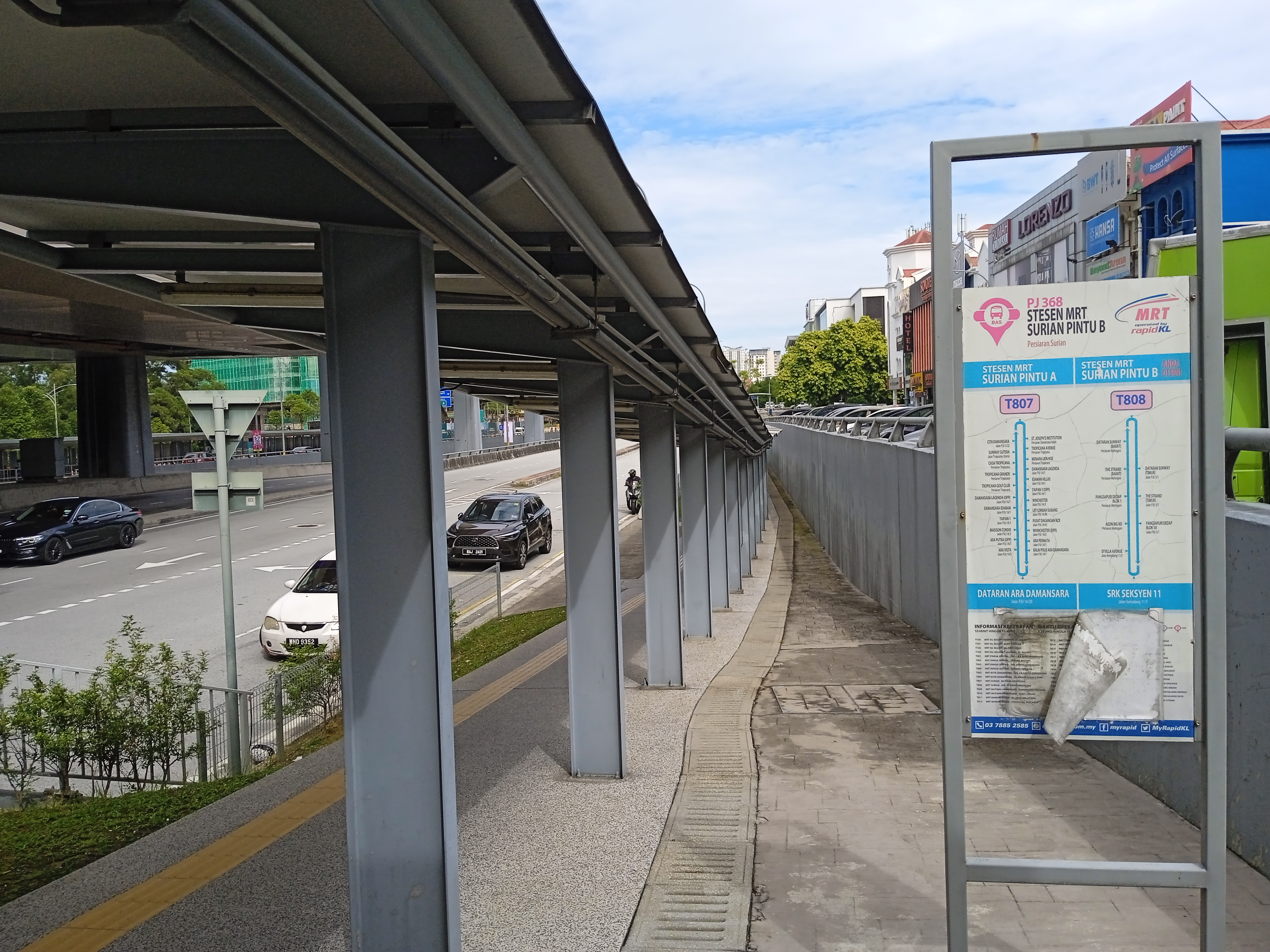
Feeder bus stop at Entrance B.

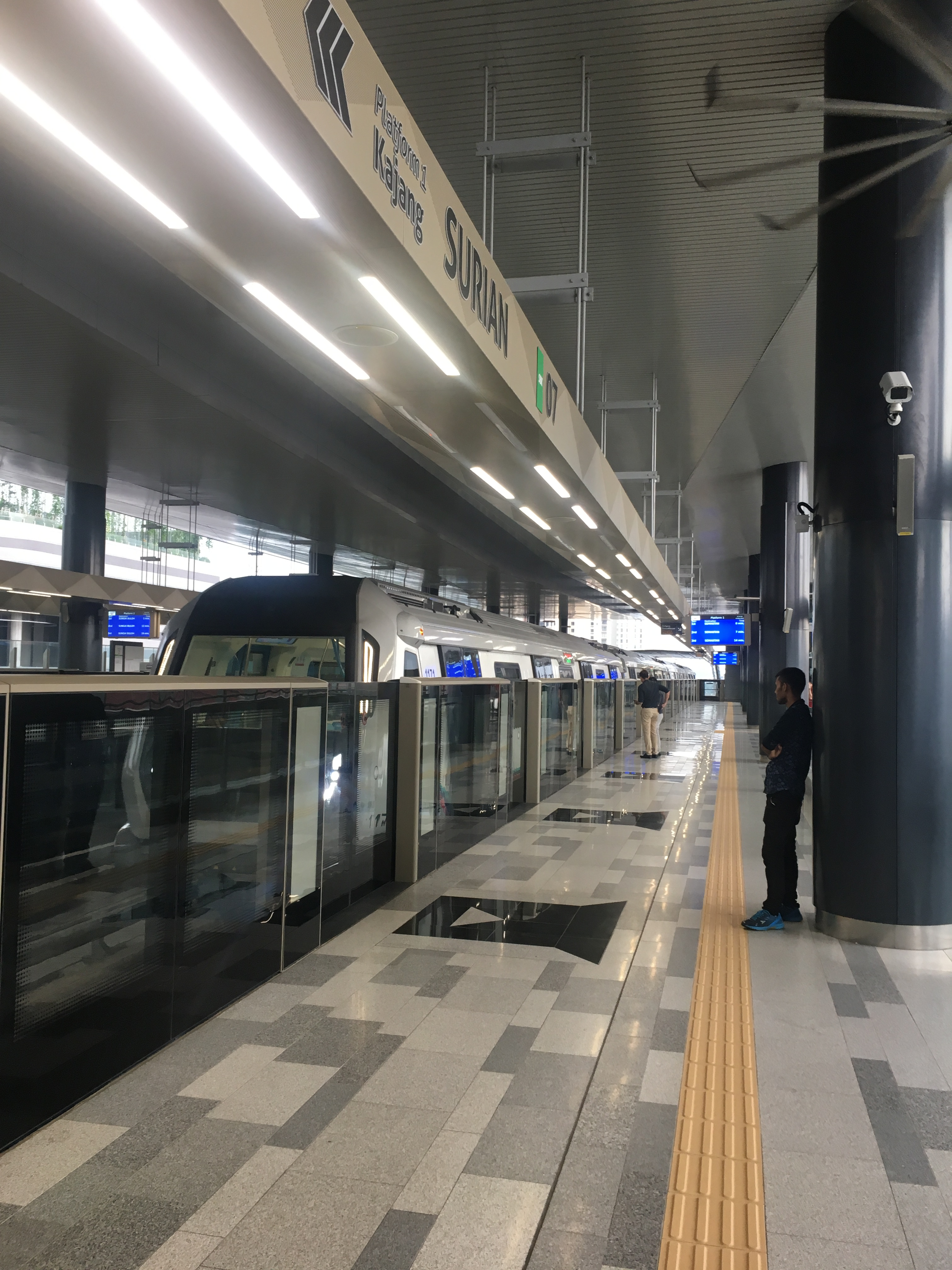
Platform 1 of the station for southbound trains.

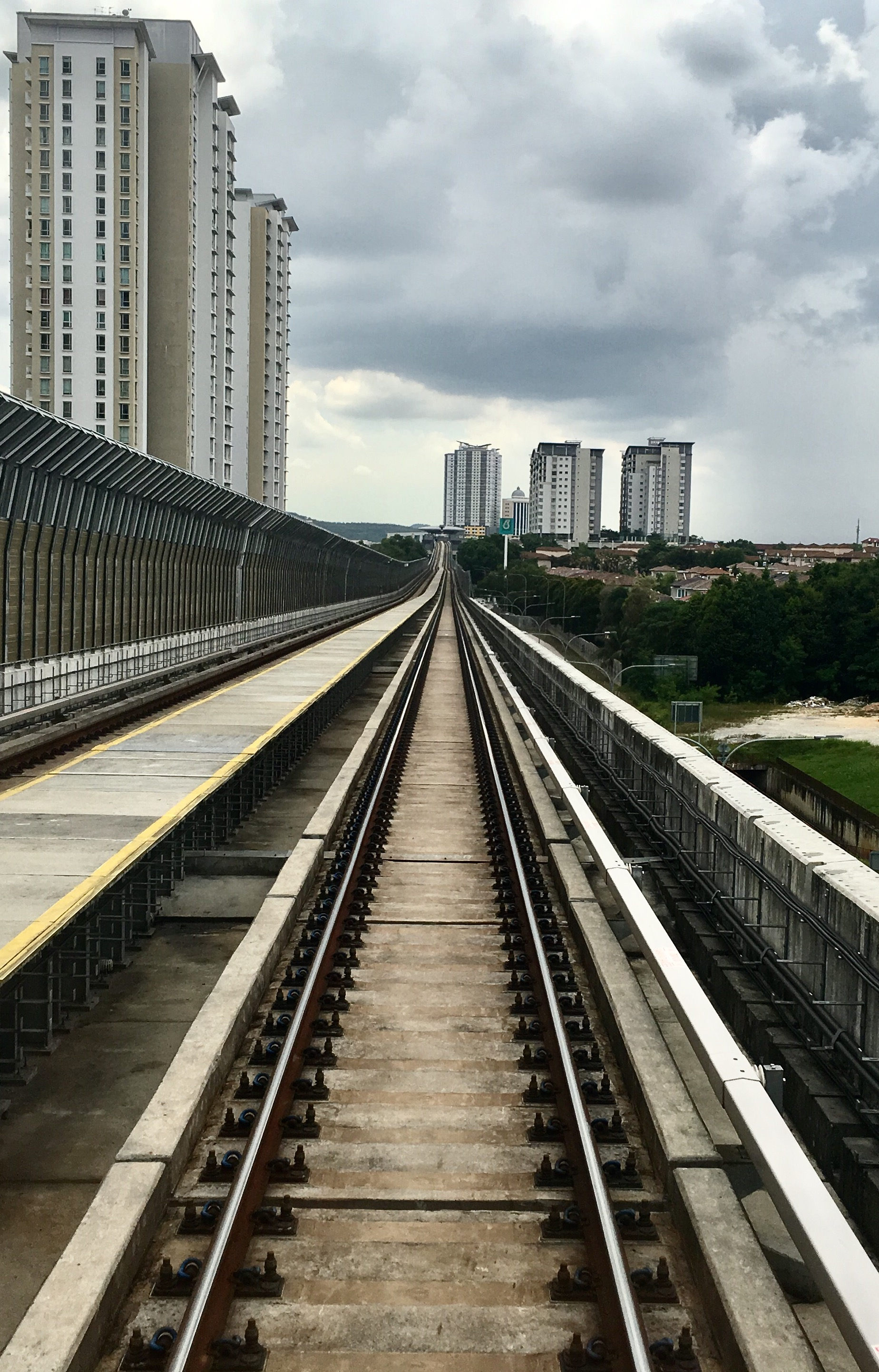
Stretch of straight tracks from Surian MRT station towards Kota Damansara MRT station.

=== Sunway Nexis-Surian MRT station link bridge ===
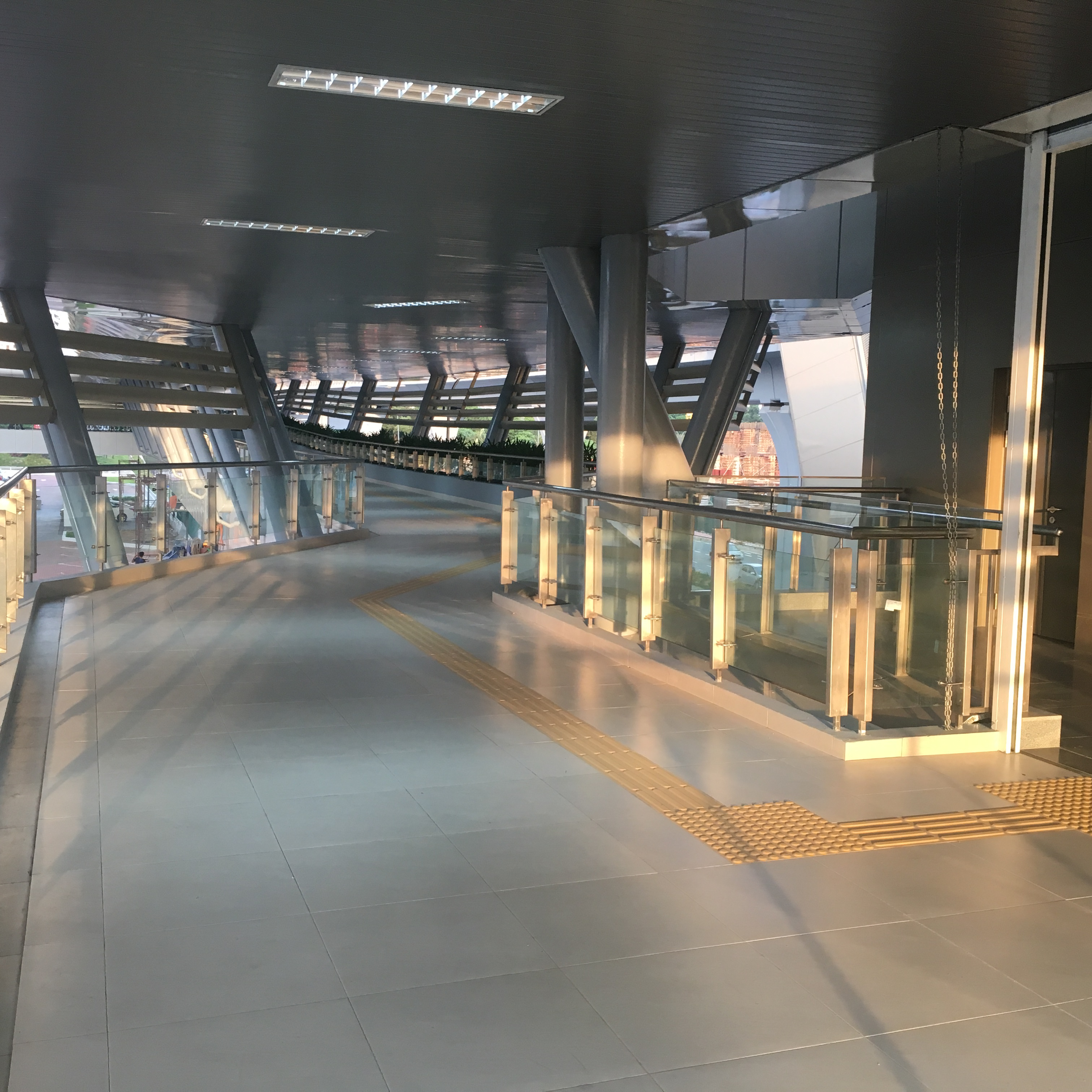
The MRT station-Sunway Nexis pedestrian link bridge seen from Entrance B.

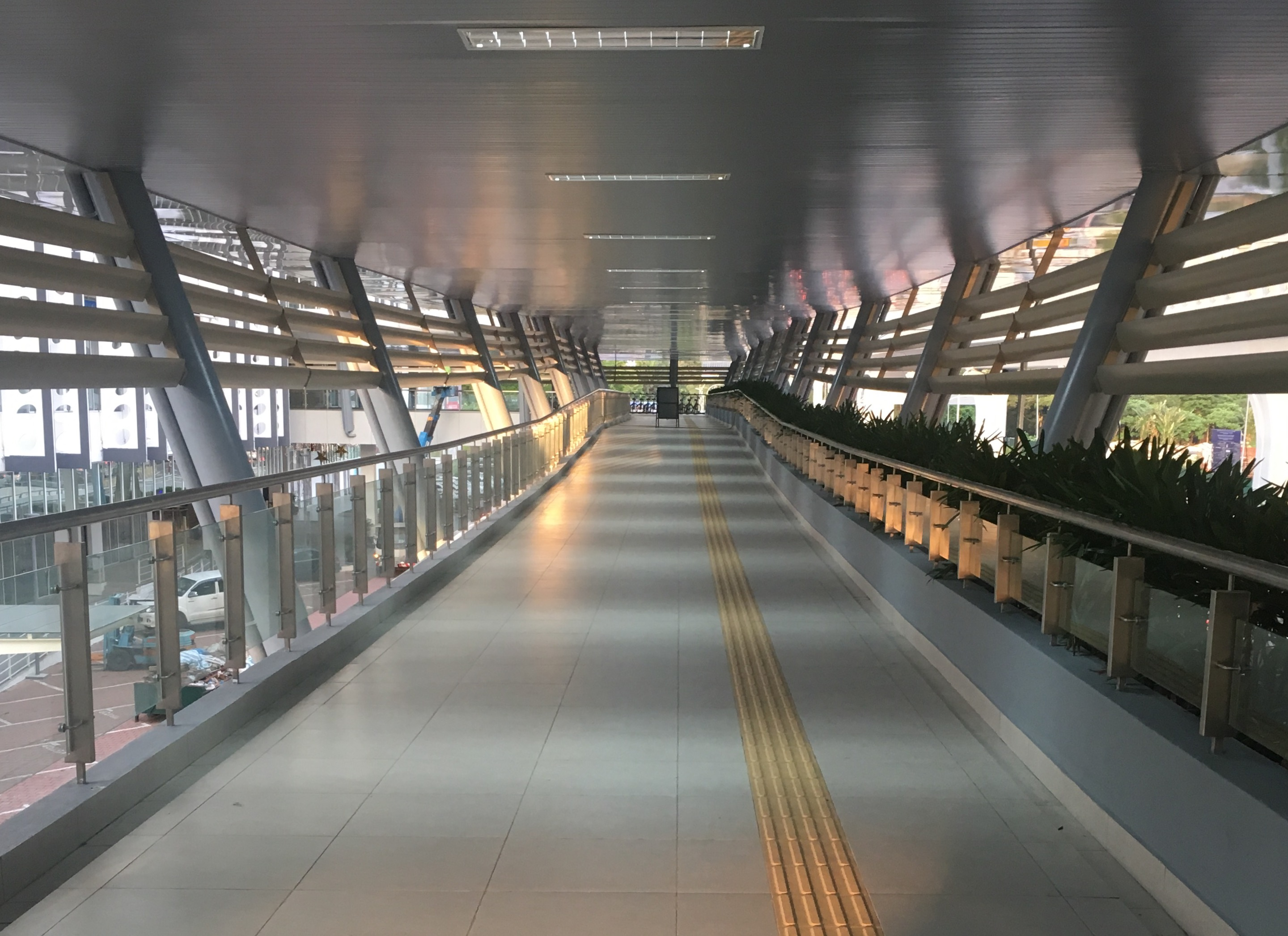
The MRT station-Sunway Nexis pedestrian link bridge.

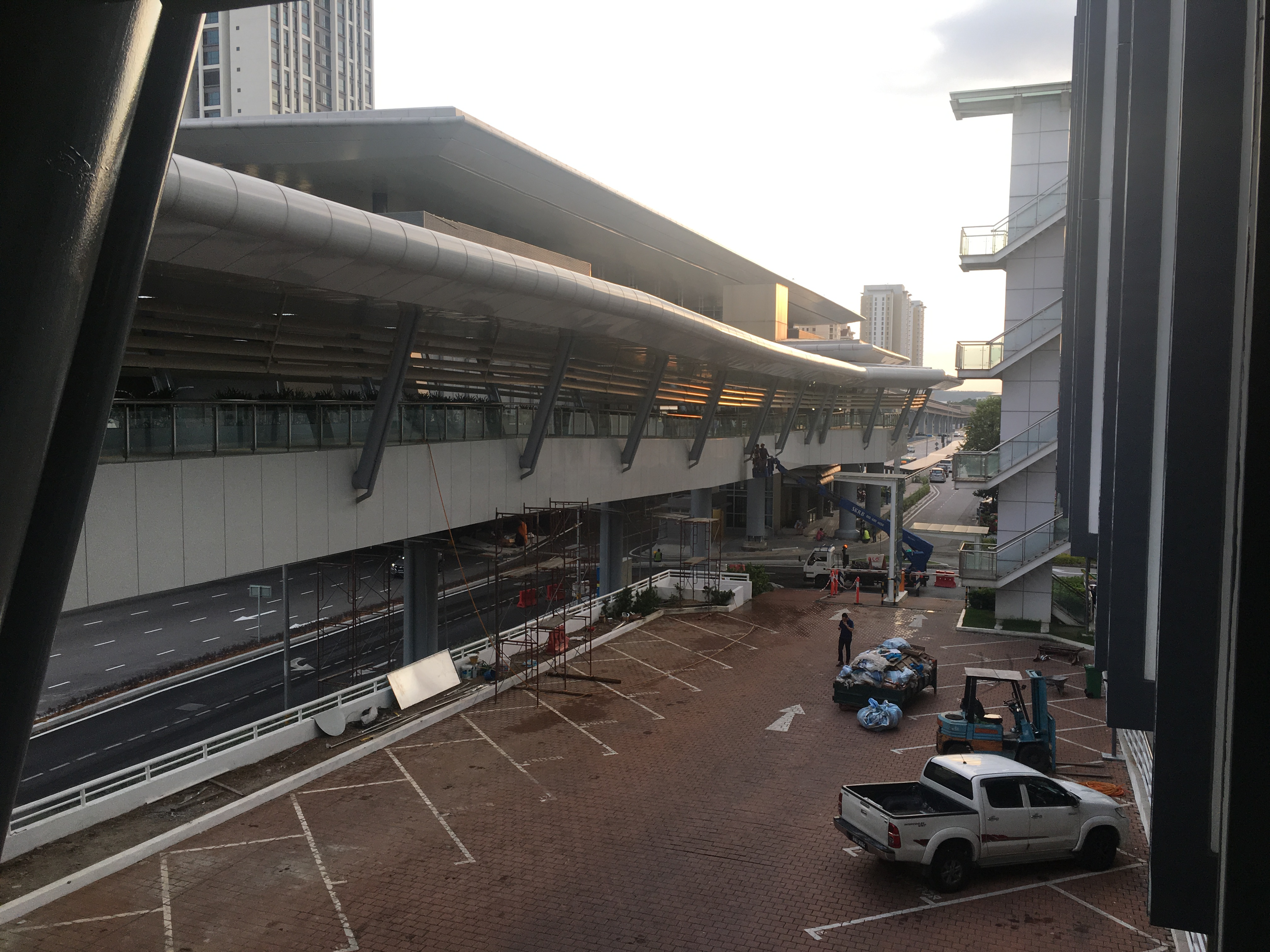
View of the MRT station-Sunway Nexis pedestrian link bridge, and the station from Sunway Nexis.

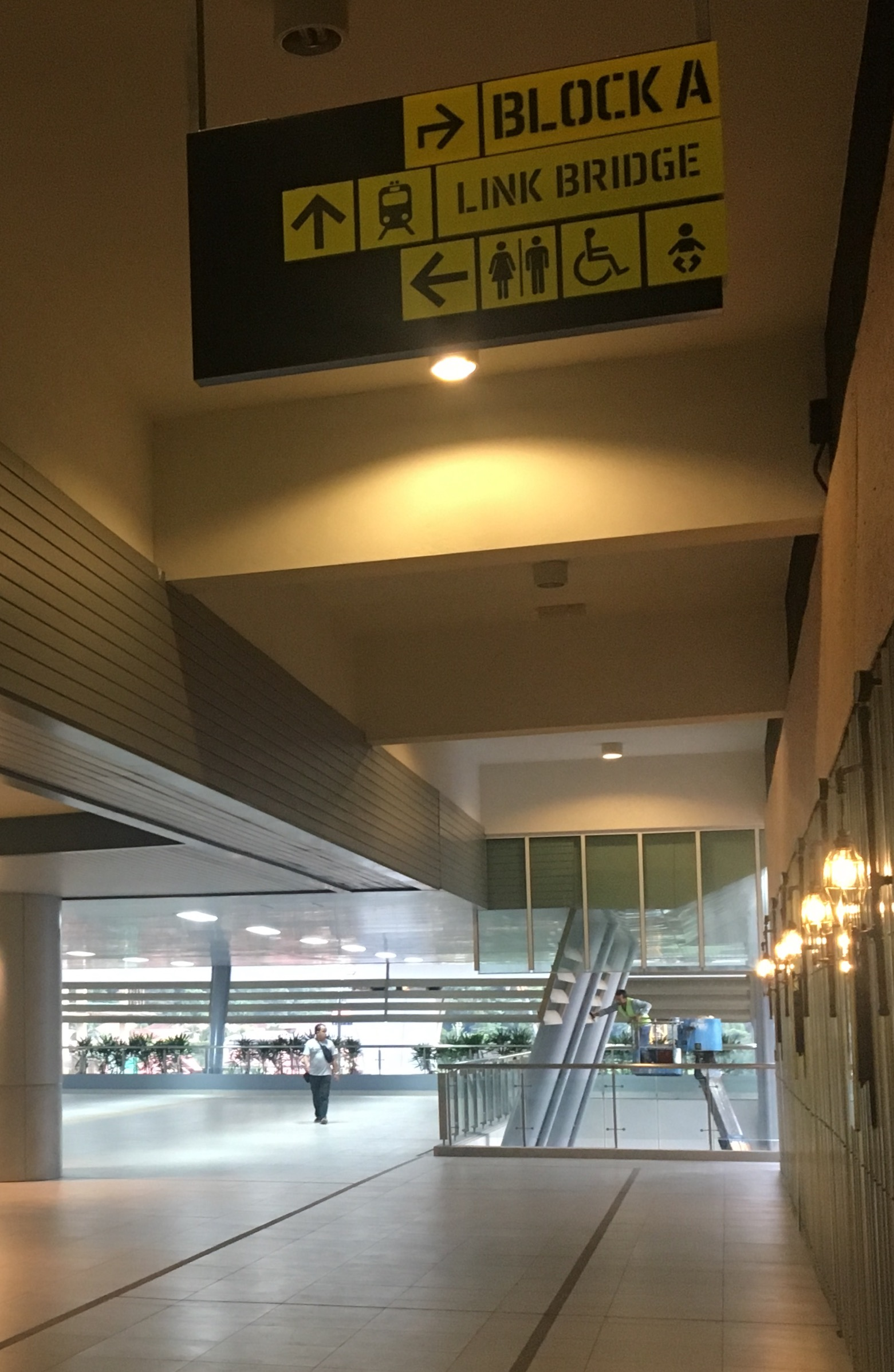
Signage inside Sunway Nexis leading to the link to the station.

=== Concourse ===
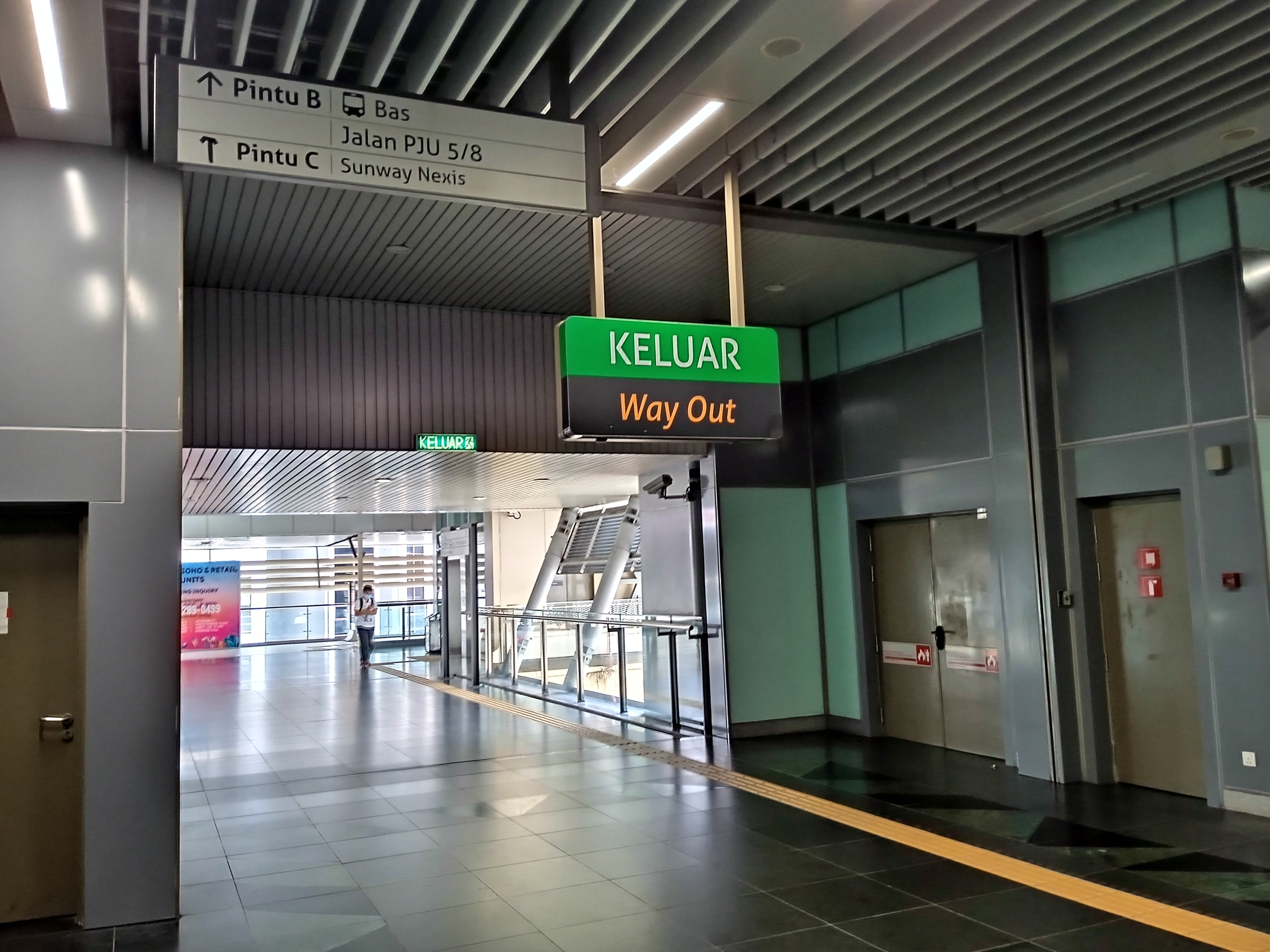
Exit to Entrance B and C (Sunway Nexis Link).

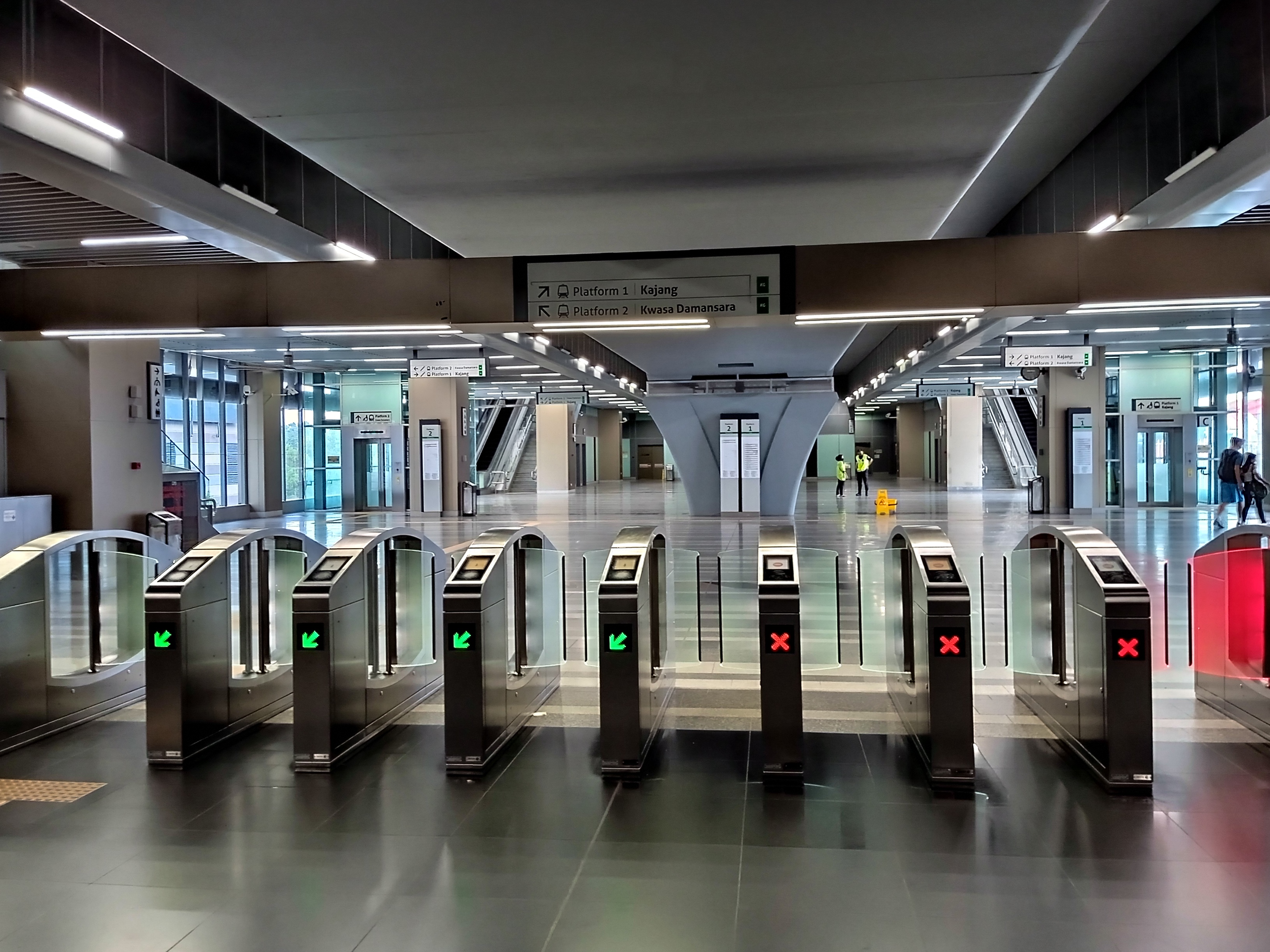
Faregates to paid zone of the concourse.

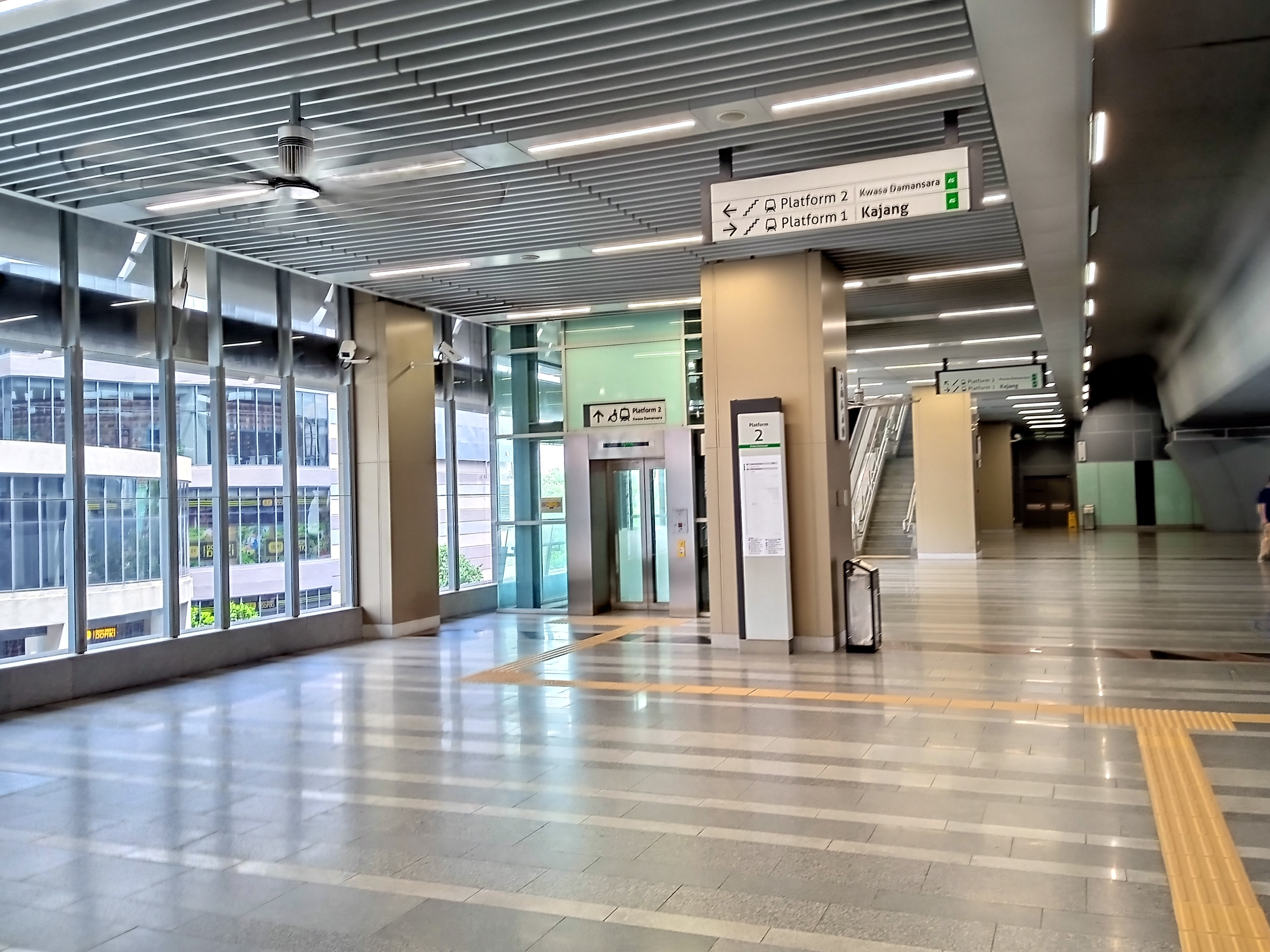
Lift to Kwasa Damansara-bound platform.

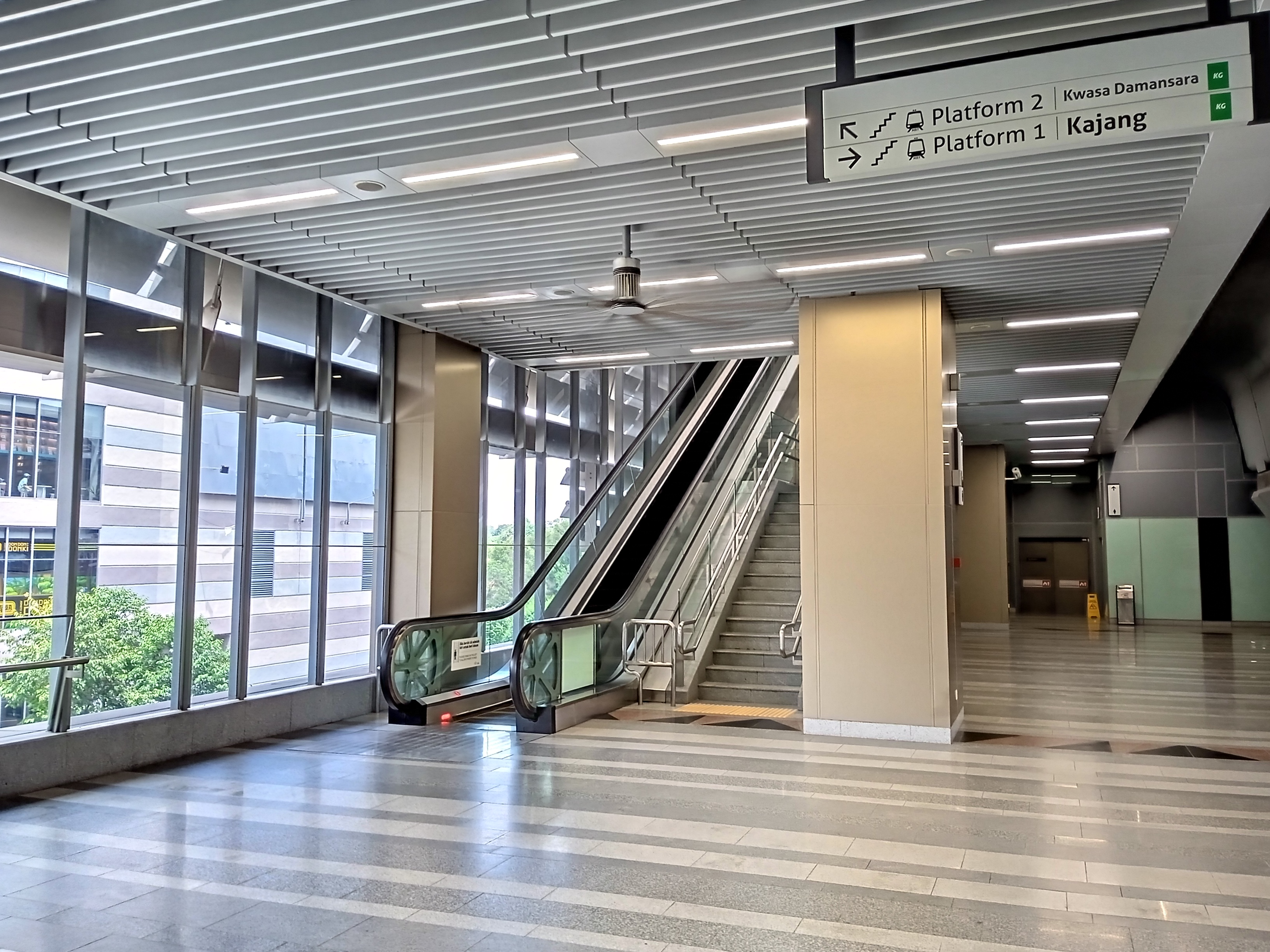
Escalator and stairs to Kwasa Damansara-bound platform

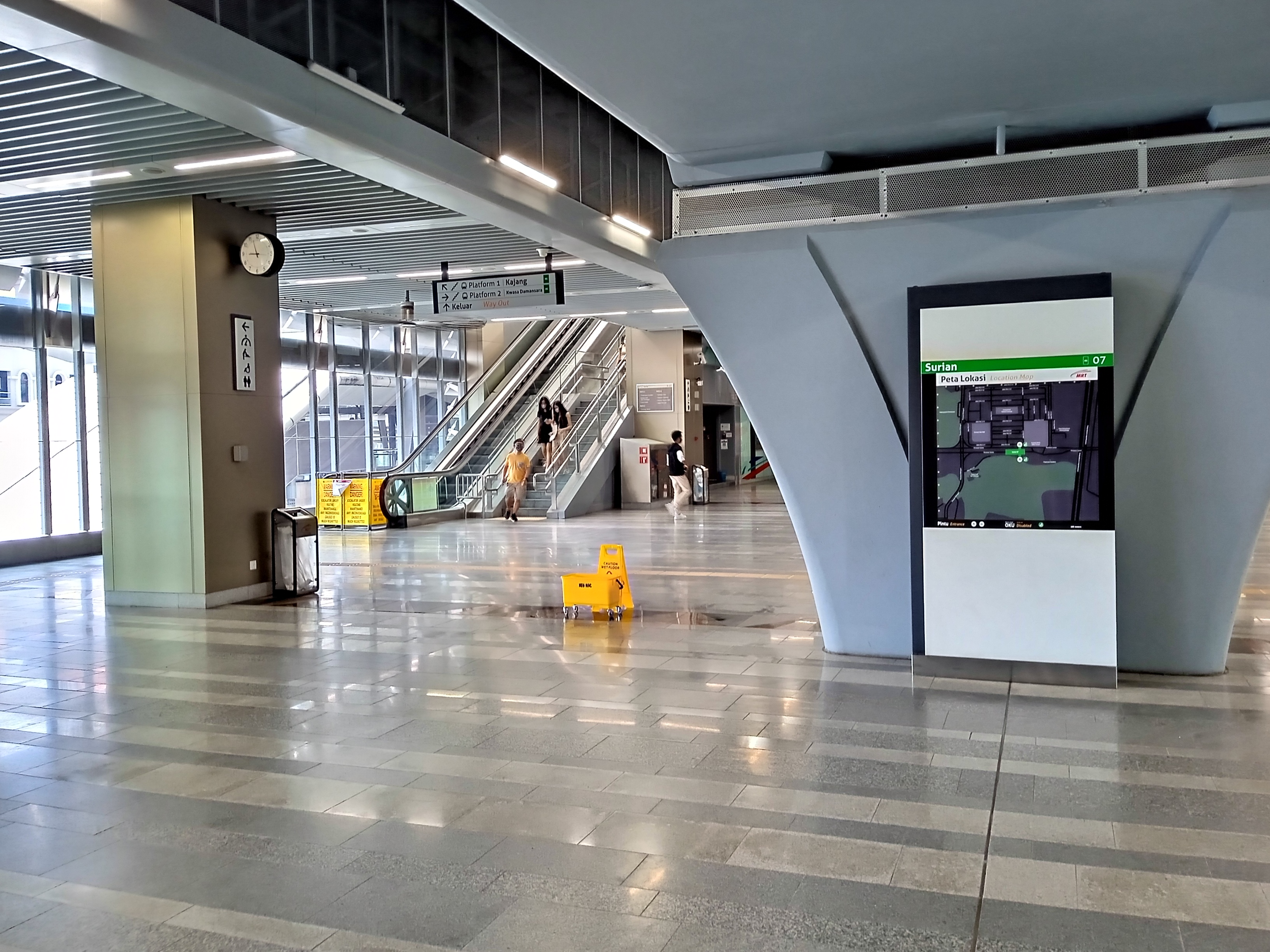
Station location map (right) and escalators (left).

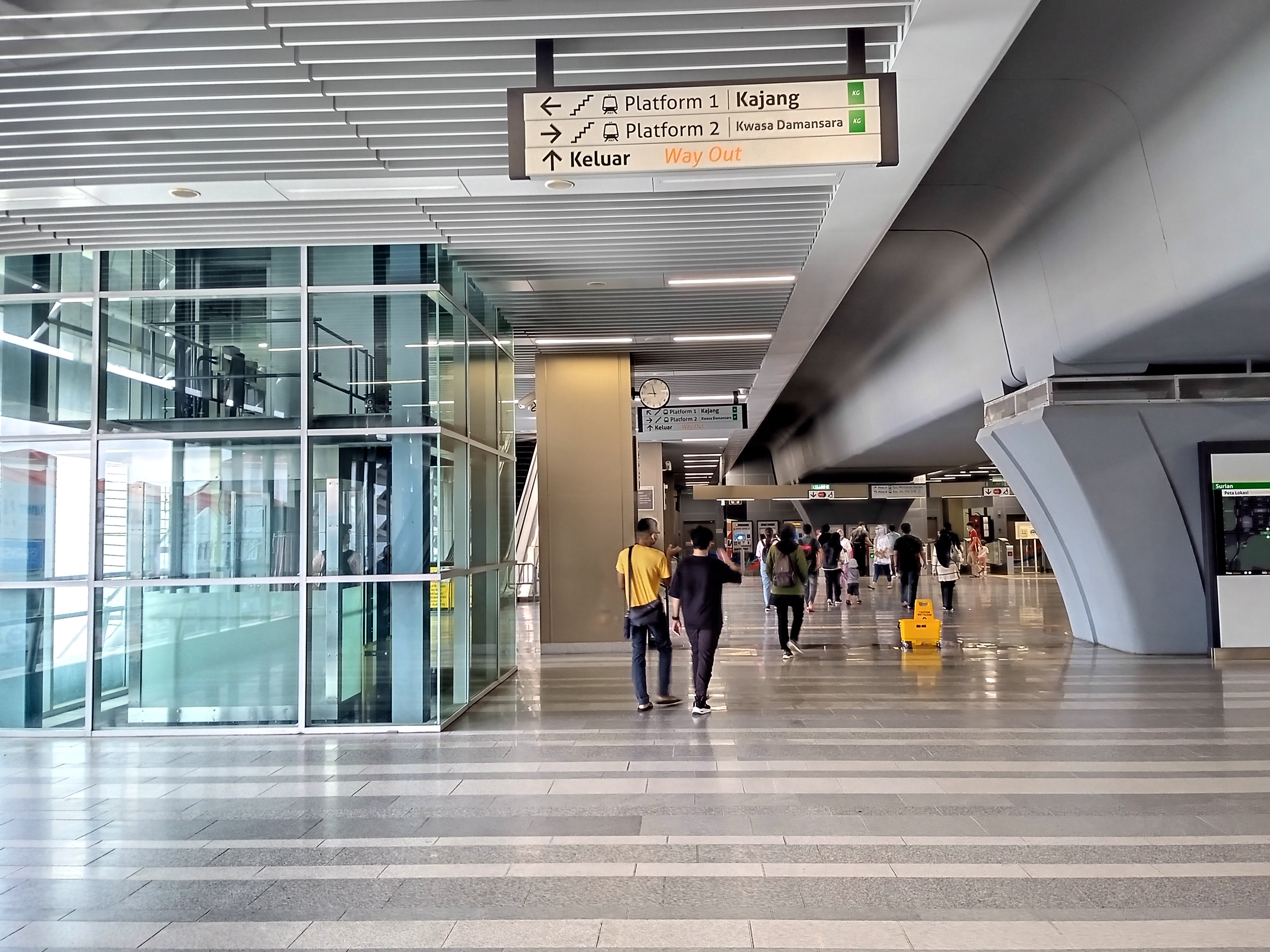
Paid zone of the concourse facing the exit.

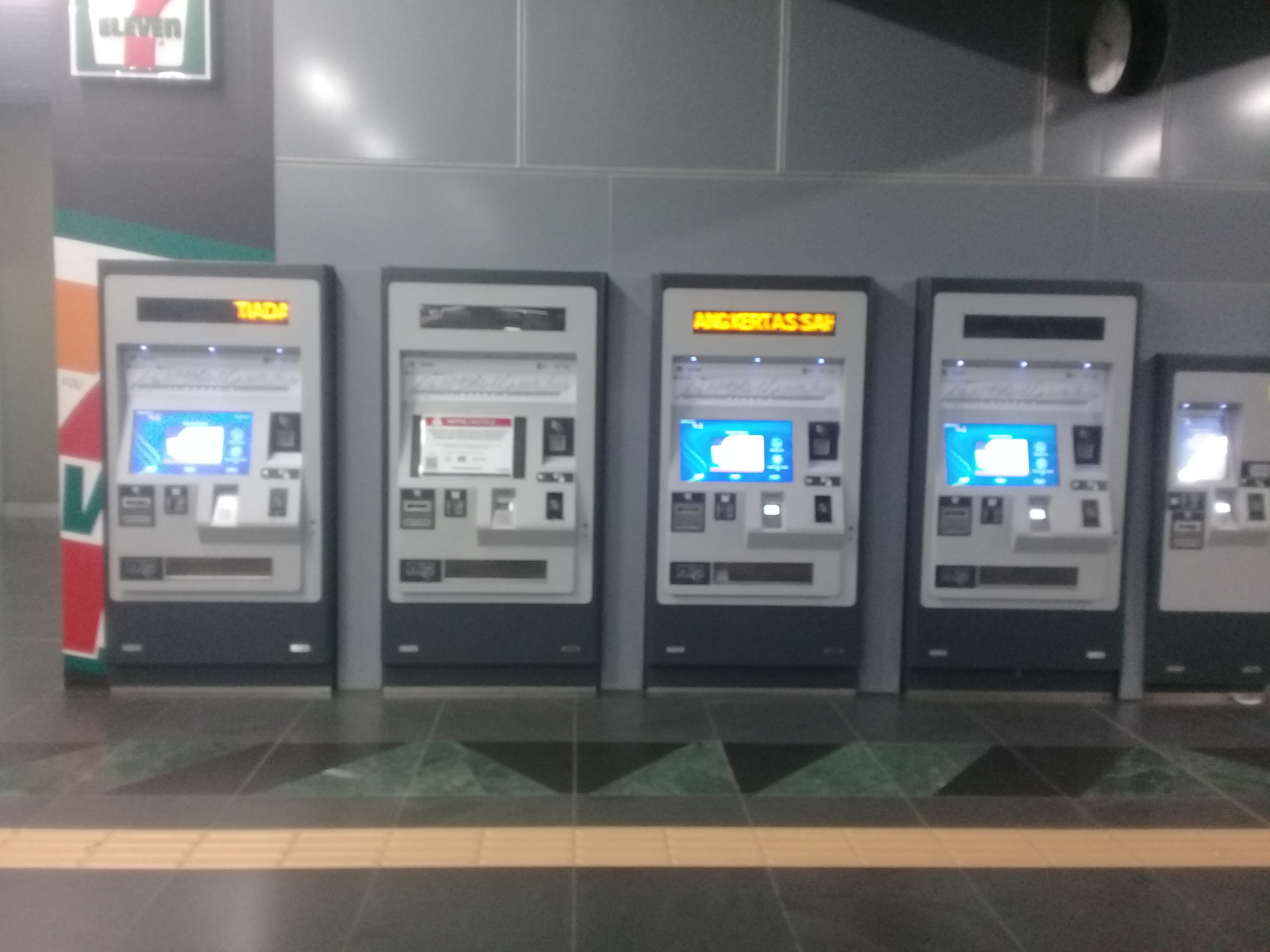
Ticket machine at the concourse.
