= Persiaran Surian =

Road in Malaysia

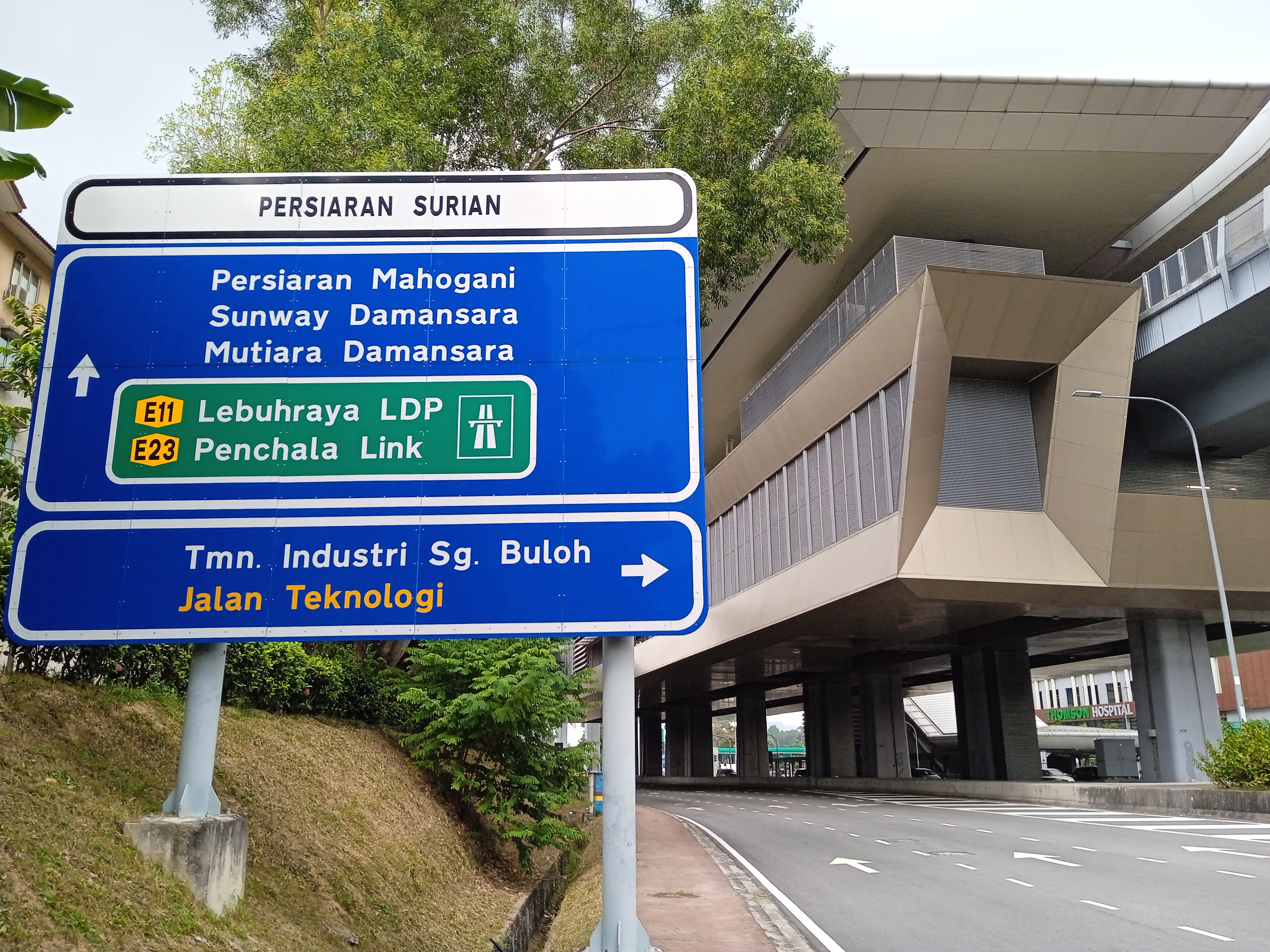

Major junctions
- West end: Persiaran Mahogani
- Persiaran Mahogani; Persiaran Sungai Buloh; Persiaran Kenanga; Damansara–Puchong Expressway
- East end: Mutiara Damansara; Damansara–Puchong Expressway

Location
- Country: Malaysia
- Primary destinations: Kota Damansara, Sungai Buloh

Highway system
- Highways in Malaysia; Expressways; Federal; State

Persiaran Surian is a major road and driveway (highway) in Petaling Jaya, Selangor, Malaysia. The driveway runs from Kota Damansara to Mutiara Damansara. It is maintained by the Petaling Jaya City Council (MBPJ) and Mutiara Rini Sdn Bhd. On weekends and public holidays, the driveway becomes a popular route to the Mutiara Damansara town centre where many retail and entertainment centres are located, such as The Curve, IPC Shopping Centre, IKEA Damansara and Cathay Cineleisure.

A portion of the elevated rapid transit line, the MRT Kajang Line, runs along the road, from one end of the road at the Persiaran Surian-exit of the Damansara–Puchong Expressway (LDP), to its intersection with Jalan Teknologi. Three stations on the Kajang Line are located on this road: Kota Damansara, Surian and Mutiara Damansara.

== Junction lists ==
The entire route is located in Petaling District, Selangor.

Legend:

- I/C - Interchange, I/S - Intersection, RSA - Rest and service area, OBR - Overhead bridge restaurant, R/R - Restaurant and rest plaza, L/B - Layby, V/P - Vista point, TN - tunnel, T/P - Toll plaza, BR - Bridge
- C - Cloverleaf, S - Stack, T-A - Trumpet-A, T-B - Trumpet-B, DT - Directional-T/Y, SDT - Semi-Directional-T/Y, P-Y - Partial-Y, D - Diamond, P-C - Partial cloverleaf, D-D - Diverging diamond, D-R - Direct ramp

Location	km	mi	Exit	Name	Destinations	Notes
Kota Damansara				Kota Damansara; Persiaran Mahogani I/S	Persiaran Mahogani – Section 10, More sections	T-junctions
Kota Damansara				Kota Damansara; Section 7 I/S	Jalan Nuri 7/1	T-junctions
Kota Damansara				Kota Damansara; Persiaran Sungai Buloh I/S	Persiaran Sungai Buloh – Taman Industri Sungai Buloh, Taman Teknologi Sains Selangor; FT 15 Batu Tiga–Sungai Buloh Highway – Kwasa Damansara, Subang, Shah Alam, Sungai Buloh	T-junctions
Kota Damansara			McDonald's drive thru			
Kota Damansara				Kota Damansara; Section 6 Exit	Jalan Cecawi 6/18	T-junctions
Kota Damansara				Kota Damansara MRT station	Kota Damansara MRT station 9	
Kota Damansara				Kota Damansara; Taman Teknologi Sains Selangor 2 I/S	Jalan Teknologi – Taman Teknologi Sains Selangor, Chocolate Museum @ Kota Damansara	T-junctions
Kota Damansara			Sungai Tambul bridge			
Kota Damansara				Surian-DASH I/C	Damansara–Shah Alam Elevated Expressway; FT 15 Sultan Abdul Aziz Shah Airport Highway – Sultan Abdul Aziz Shah Airport, Petaling Jaya, Subang Jaya, Puncak Perdana, Subang; Damansara–Puchong Expressway – Kepong, Sungai Buloh, Bandar Sri Damansara, Petaling Jaya, Puchong, Putrajaya, Cyberjaya, Sungai Besi	Semi directional T interchange No exit to Damansara
Kota Damansara				Kota Damansara; Persiaran Kenanga I/C	Persiaran Kenanga – Section 4 until 6 New Klang Valley Expressway / AH2 / AH141 – Ipoh, Kuala Lumpur, Klang, Kuala Lumpur International Airport (KLIA), Johor Bahru	T-junctions with ramp to Sungai Buloh
Kota Damansara				Kota Damansara; Taman Teknologi Sains Selangor 1 I/S	Jalan Teknologi – Taman Teknologi Sains Selangor, Sekolah Sri KDU	T-junctions
Kota Damansara			Petronas L/B – Petronas, A&W			
Kota Damansara				Kota Damansara; Section 4 I/S	Jalan Camar – Section 4	T-junctions
Kota Damansara				Kota Damansara; Surian I/S	Persiaran Mahogani – Section 4 until 10, Dataran Sunway; Persiaran Damansara Indah – Seri Selangor Golf and Country Club	Junctions
Kota Damansara				Surian MRT station	Surian MRT station 9	
Kota Damansara			Bridge			
Kota Damansara				Jalan PJU 3/22 Exit	Jalan PJU 3/22 – Tropicana Golf and Country Club, Damansara Utama	T-junctions
Kota Damansara			Shell L/B			
Kota Damansara				Persiaran Bukit Utama Exit	Persiaran Bukit Utama Exit	T-junctions
Kota Damansara			Shell L/B			
Mutiara Damansara				Surian Tunnel; Mutiara Damansara; Jalan PJU 7/1 I/S	Jalan PJU 7/1 – Mutiara Damansara, Damansara Perdana	Tunnel interchange
Mutiara Damansara				Mutiara Damansara MRT station	Mutiara Damansara MRT station 9	
Mutiara Damansara				Surian Tunnel; Mutiara Damansara; The Curve I/S	Jalan PJU 7/8 – Mutiara Damansara, Cathay Cineleisure, The Curve, IPC Shopping Centre, IKEA, Lotus's Mutiara Damansara	Tunnel interchange
Mutiara Damansara				Surian Tunnel; Dataran Bandar Utama Exit	Dataran Bandar Utama – Bandar Utama, One Utama, Bandar Utama driving range	From LDP only
Mutiara Damansara				Persiaran Surian-LDP Entry/exit	Damansara–Puchong Expressway – Mont Kiara, Sri Hartamas, Taman Tun Dr Ismail, Sungai Buloh, Kepong, Kuantan	LILO
1.000 mi = 1.609 km; 1.000 km = 0.621 mi: Incomplete access

== See also ==
- Persiaran Kewajipan, similar road in UEP Subang Jaya (USJ) that has an elevated Kelana Jaya line.
