= Kota Damansara MRT station =

MRT station in Petaling Jaya, Selangor, Malaysia

KG06 Kota Damansara – Thomson Hospital
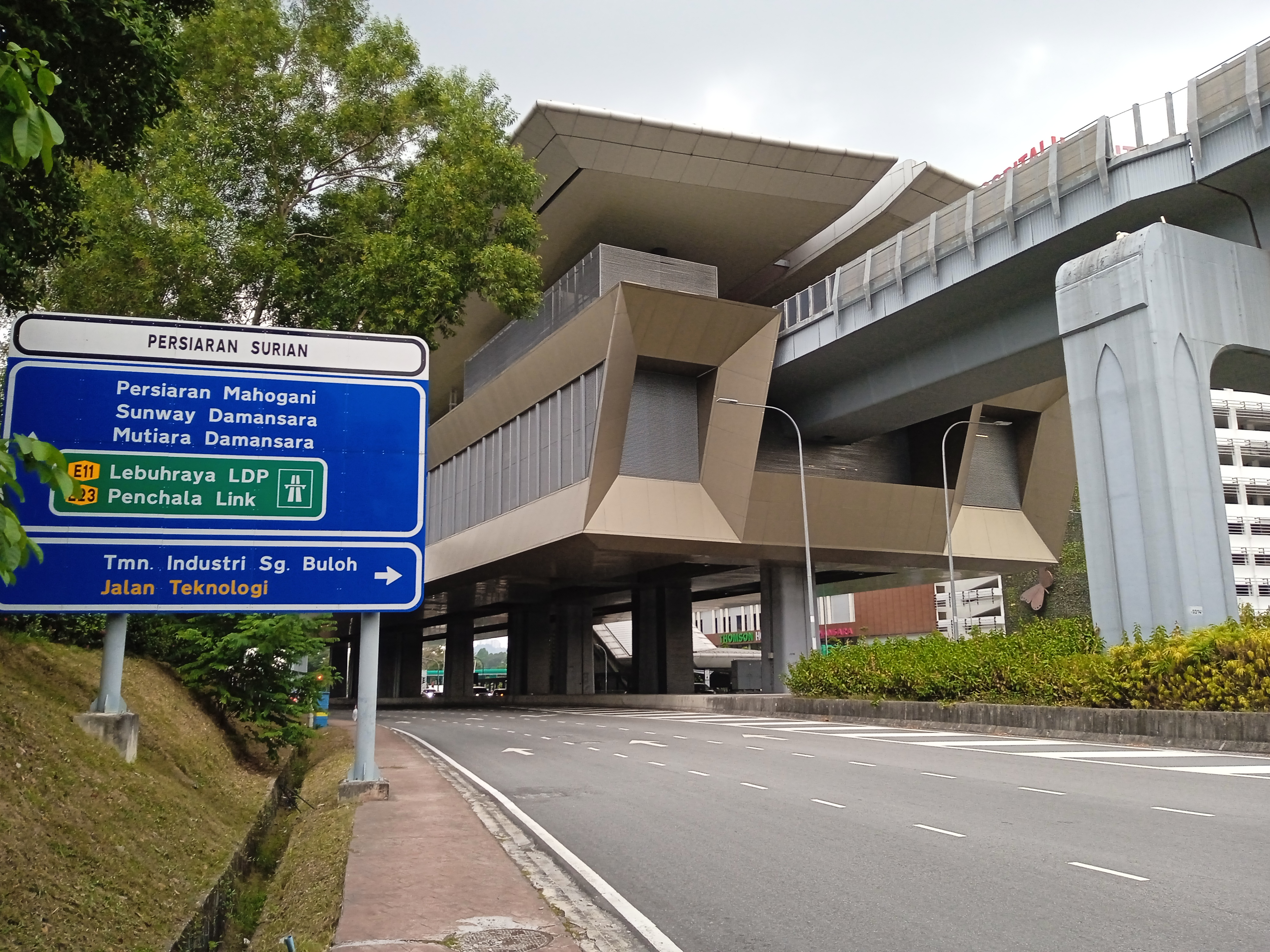
- Exterior of station from Persiaran Surian

General information
- Other names: Malay: کوتا دامنسارا (Jawi); Chinese: 哥打白沙罗; Tamil: கோத்தா டாமன்சாரா
- Location: Persiaran Surian, Kota Damansara, PJU5, 47810 Petaling Jaya; Selangor; Malaysia
- Coordinates: 3°9′1.087″N 101°34′43.02″E
- System: Rapid KL
- Owner: MRT Corp
- Operator: Rapid Rail
- Line: 9 Kajang Line
- Platforms: 2 side platforms
- Tracks: 2

Construction
- Structure type: Elevated
- Parking: Not available
- Cycle facilities: Available. 32 bicycle bays.
- Accessible: Yes

Other information
- Station code: KG06

History
- Opened: 16 December 2016; 9 years ago
- Former names: PJU 5

Services
Preceding station		Following station
Kwasa Sentral towards Kwasa Damansara	Kajang Line	Surian towards Kajang
Location

The Kota Damansara MRT station, or Kota Damansara–Thomson Hospital under the station naming rights programme, is a mass rapid transit (MRT) station serving the suburb of Kota Damansara in Petaling Jaya, Selangor, Malaysia. It is one of the stations on the MRT Kajang Line (formerly known as MRT Sungai Buloh-Kajang Line). The station opened on 16 December 2016 as part of Phase One of the line's operations.

The station is located near SEGi University and Thomson Hospital Kota Damansara.

== Station features ==
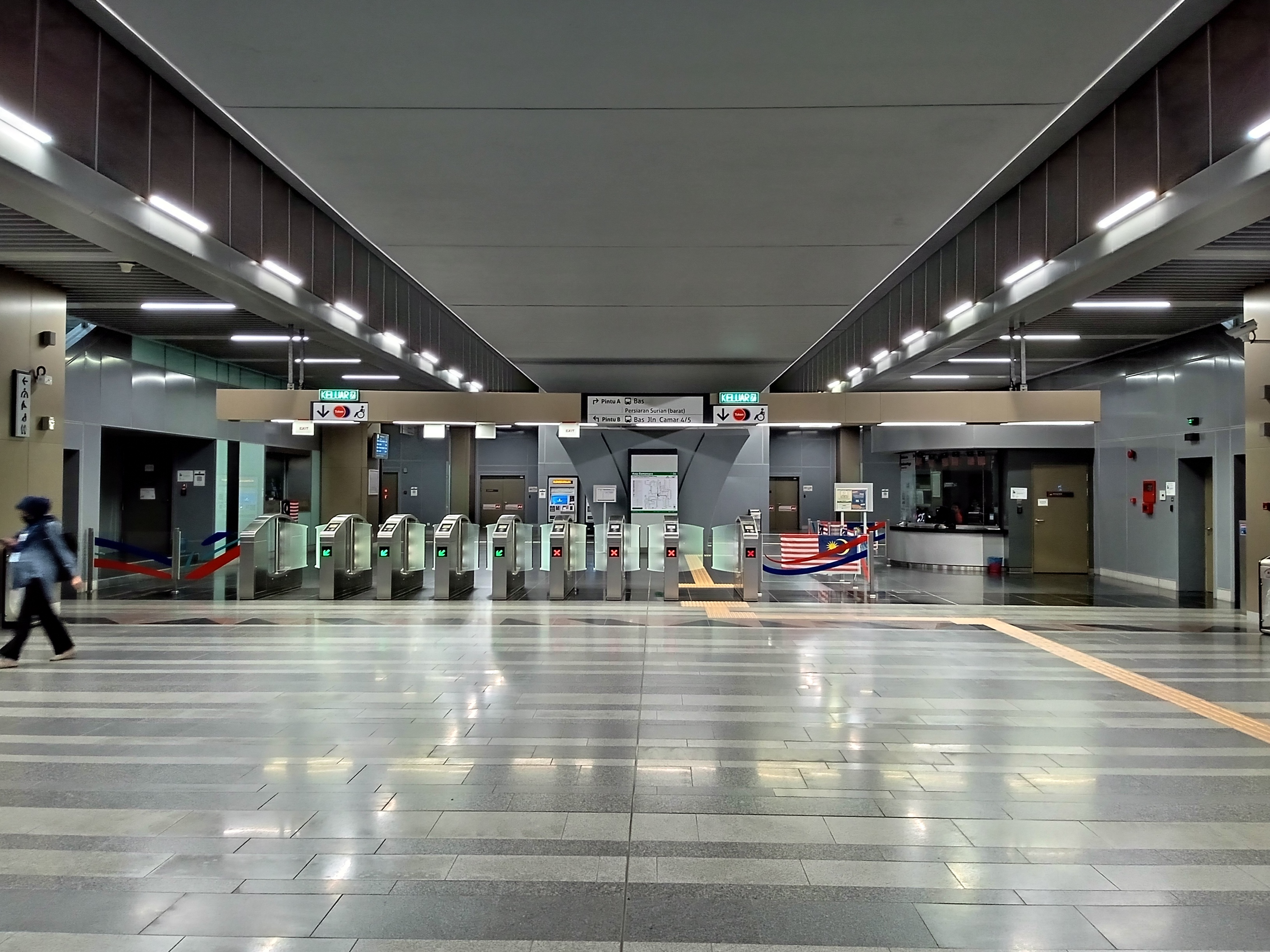
Concourse of station.

The station adopts the standard design for all elevated stations of the Kajang Line. The station is built above Persiaran Surian, with its supporting piers along the road's median.

=== Station location ===
The station is located above Persiaran Surian, near the intersection of that road and Jalan Teknologi, in the area known as PJU5 or Kota Damansara.

Well-known landmarks near the station include Thomson Hospital Kota Damansara (previously known as Tropicana Medical Centre), SEGi University's main campus, Sri KDU International School and the Gugusan Melati flats. The Kota Dame (formerly Uptown Kota Damansara) night market can be accessed via feeder bus from this station.

=== Station layout ===
L2	Platform Level	Side platform
L2	Platform Level	Platform 1: 9 Kajang Line towards KG35 Kajang (→)
L2	Platform Level	Platform 2: 9 Kajang Line towards KG04 Kwasa Damansara (←)
L2	Platform Level	Side platform
L1	Concourse	Faregates to paid area, escalators to platforms, ticketing machines, customer service office, station control, shops, Entrance A and B escalators and lifts from ground level.
G	Ground Level	Feeder Bus Stop, Taxi Lay-By, Kiss and Ride Lay-By

=== Exits and entrances ===
The station has two entrances - Entrance A and Entrance B - situated on both sides of Persiaran Surian. Entrance B is also accessible from Jalan Camar 4/5, which runs parallel to Persiaran Surian. There are feeder bus stops, taxi lay-bys and also drop-off areas at both entrances along Persiaran Surian.

Kajang Line station
Entrance	Location	Destination	Picture
A	South side of Persiaran Surian	Feeder bus stop, taxi and private vehicle lay-by, Jalan Teknologi, Thomson Hospital Kota Damansara, SEGi University, Sri KDU Schools, A & W Kota Damansara Fast Food Restaurant	
B	North side of Persiaran Surian; South side of Jalan Camar 4/5	Feeder bus stop, taxi and private vehicle lay-by, Gugusan Melati Flats, I Residence	

== Gallery ==
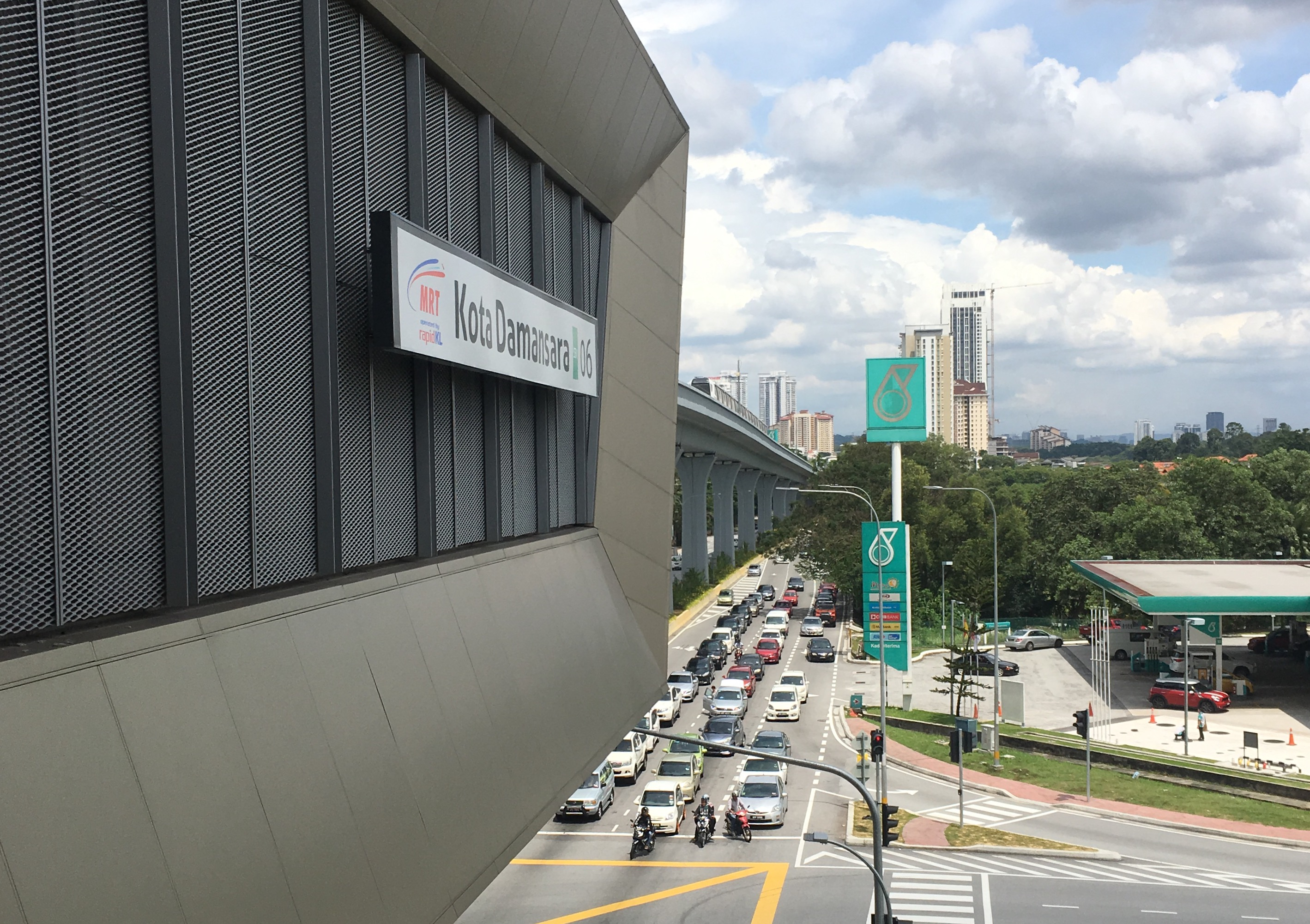
Station signage with Persiaran Surian below

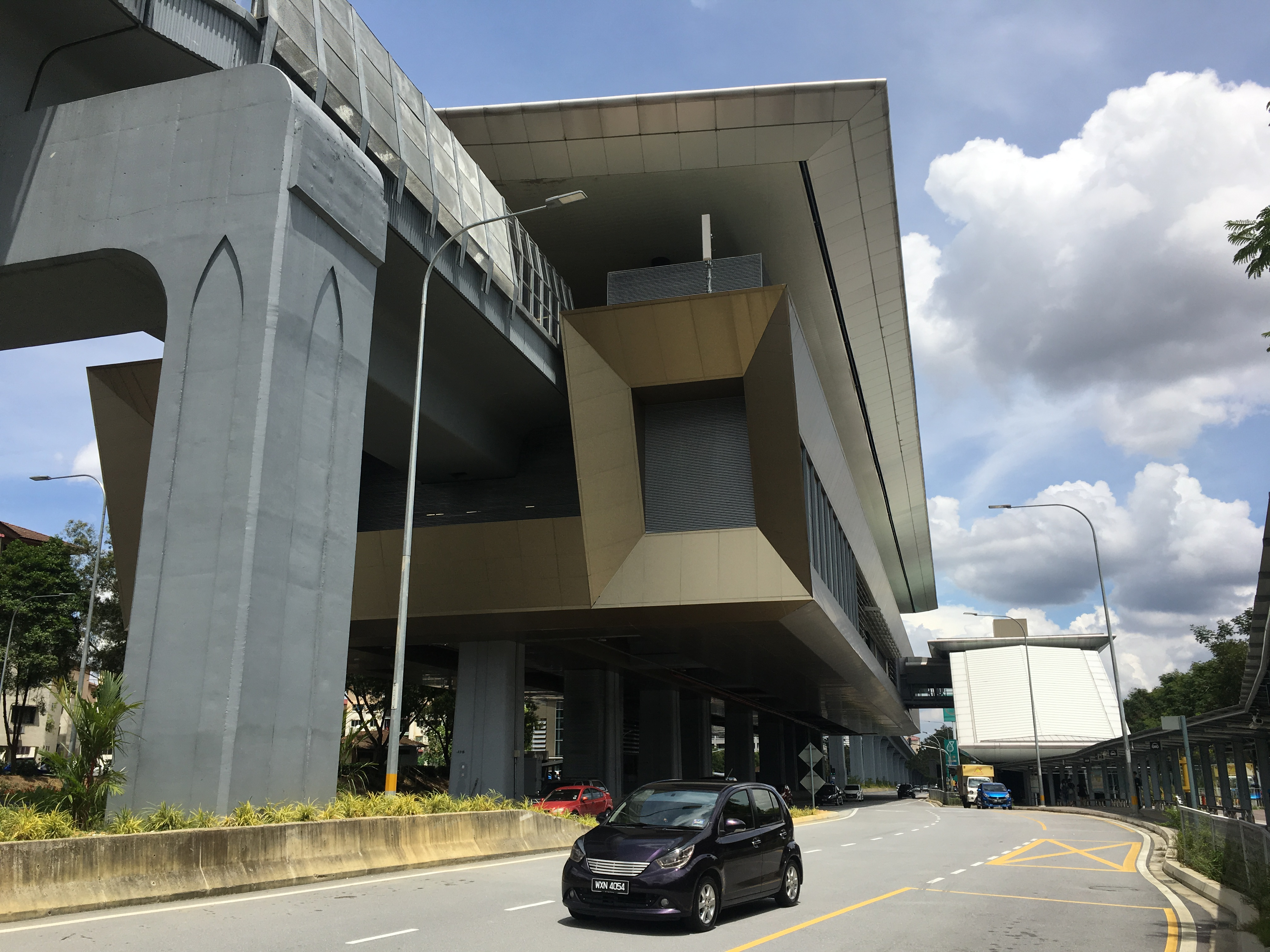
View of the station from Entrance A

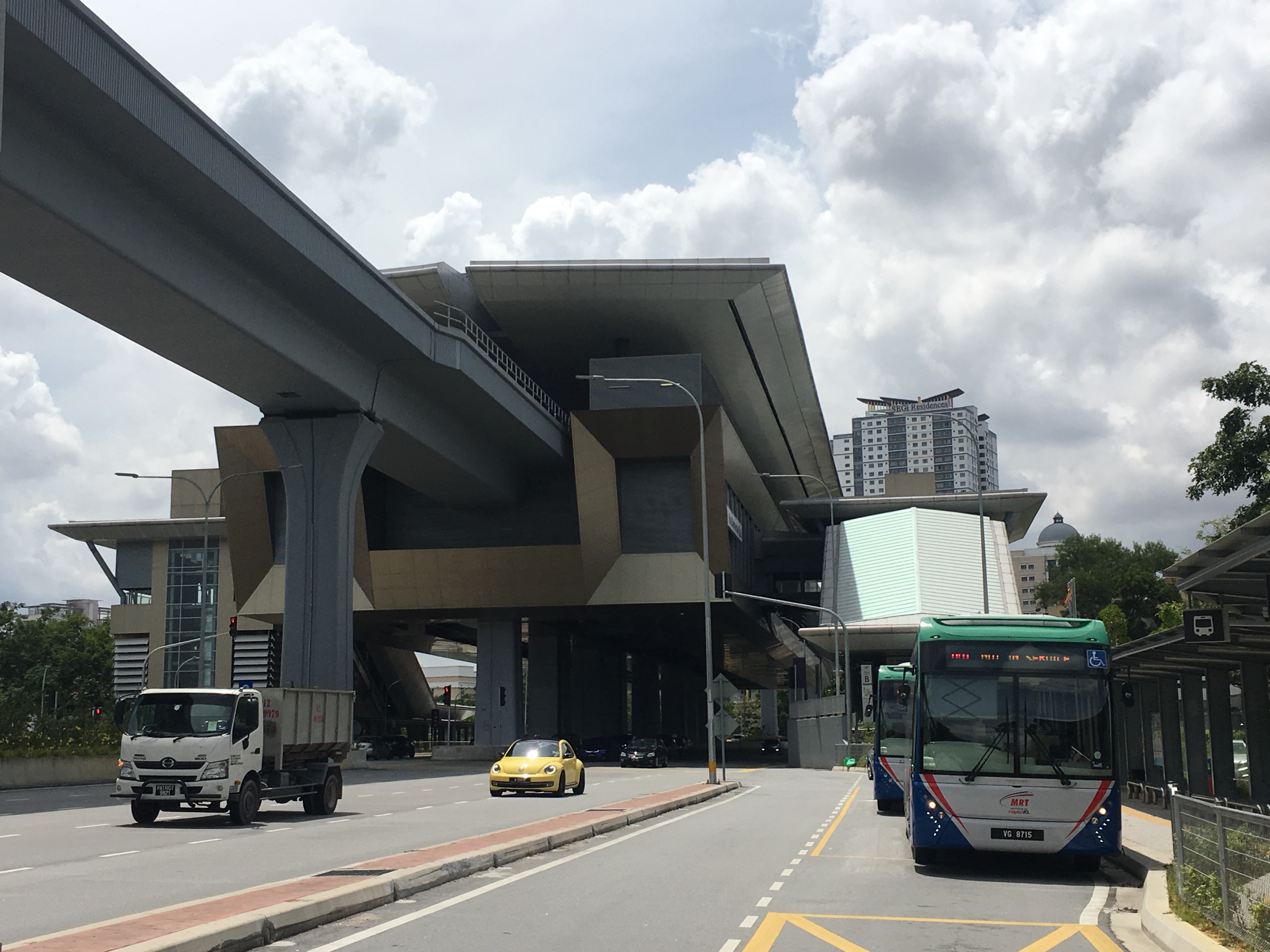
View of the station from Entrance B, with feeder bus stop

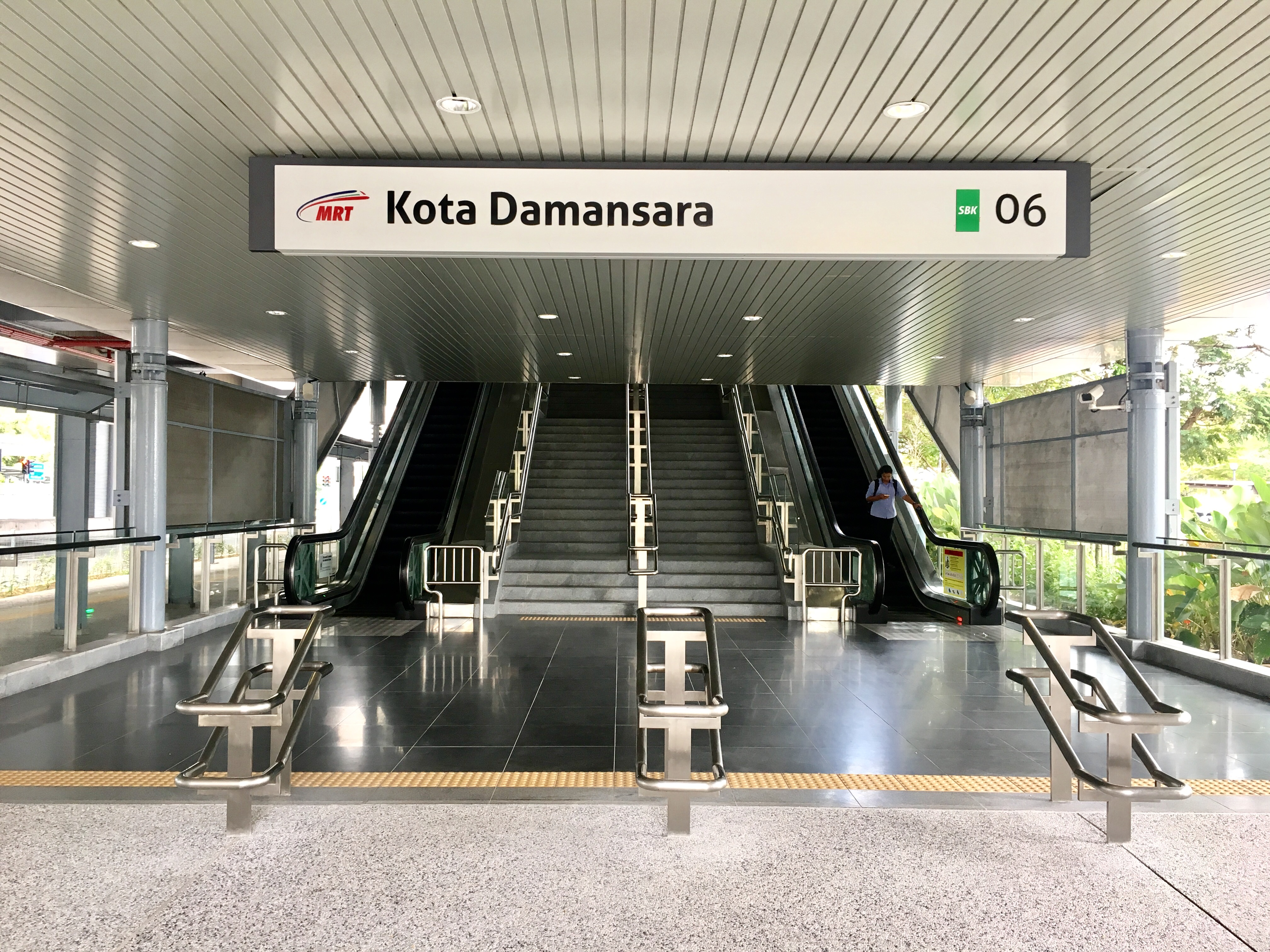
Entrance A escalators

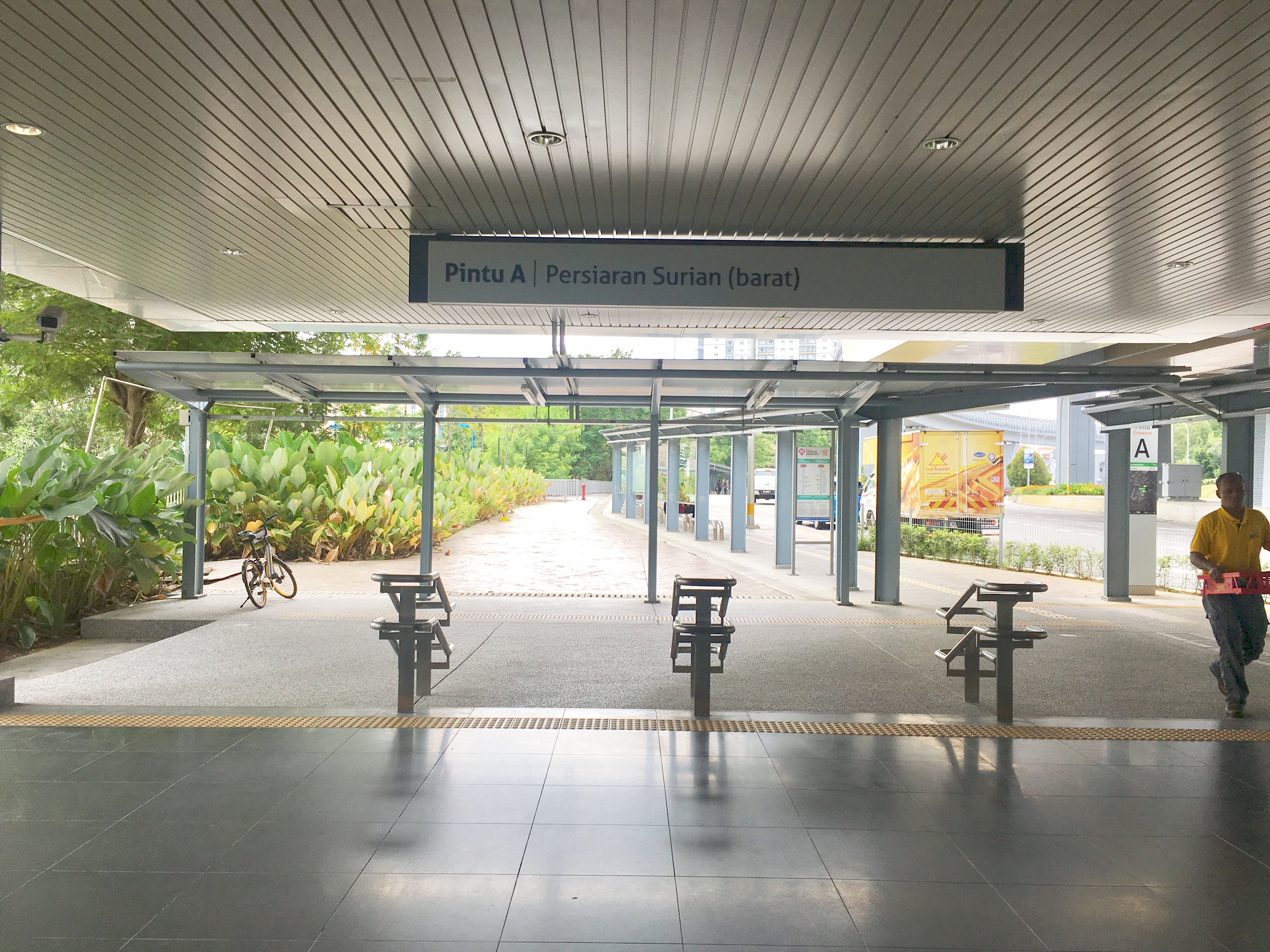
Looking out from Entrance A

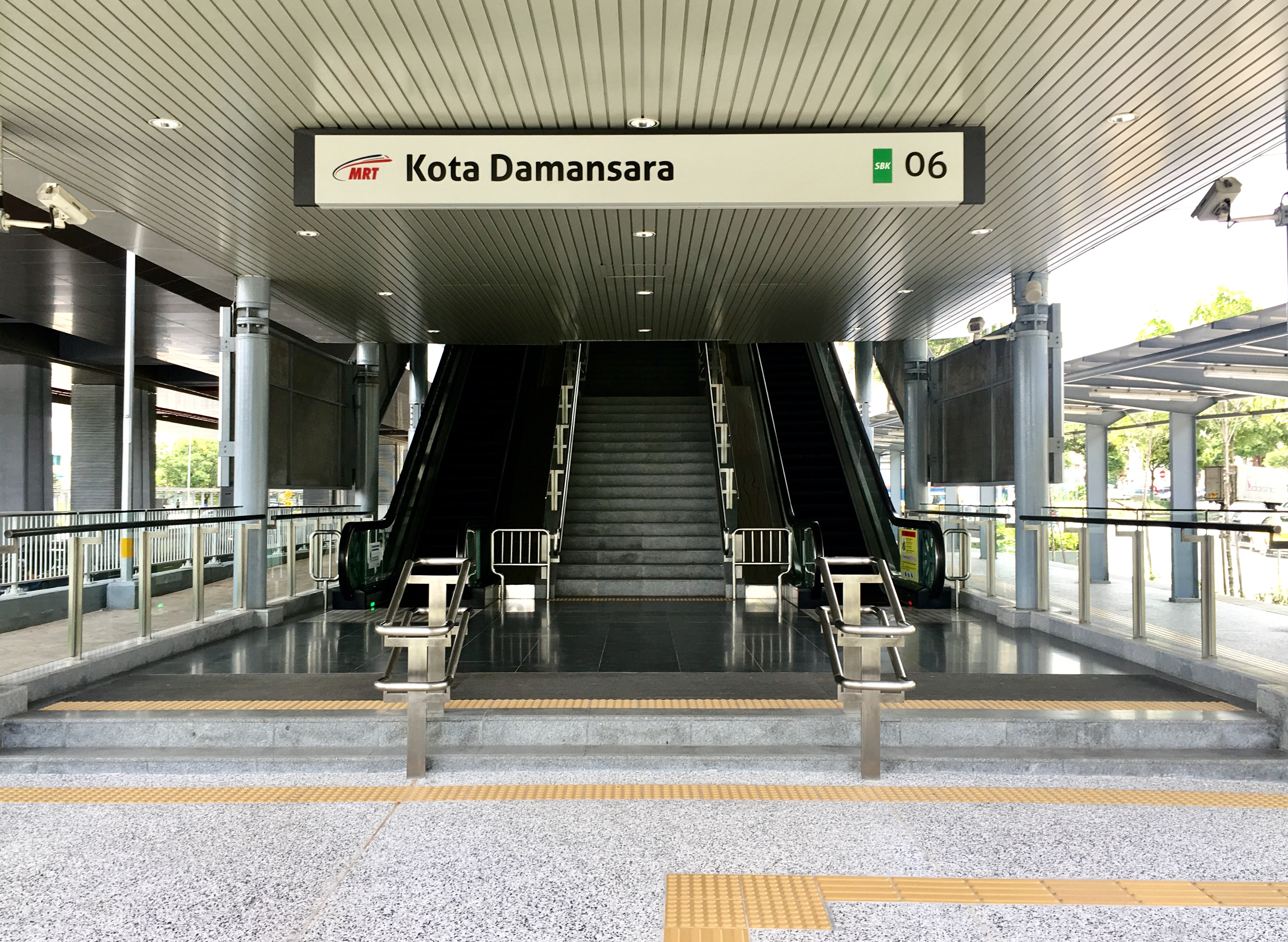
Entrance B escalators

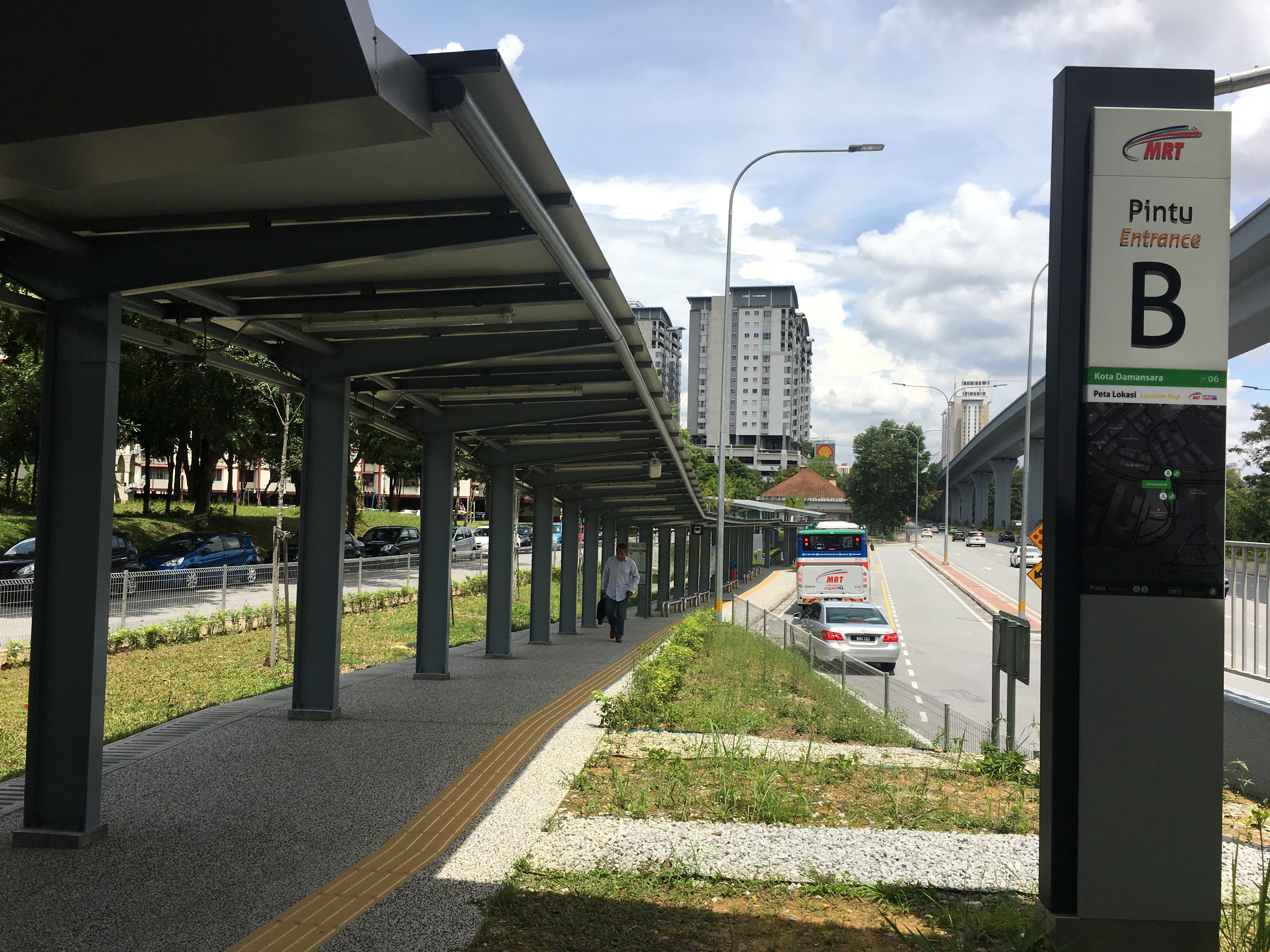
Feeder bus stop at Entrance B

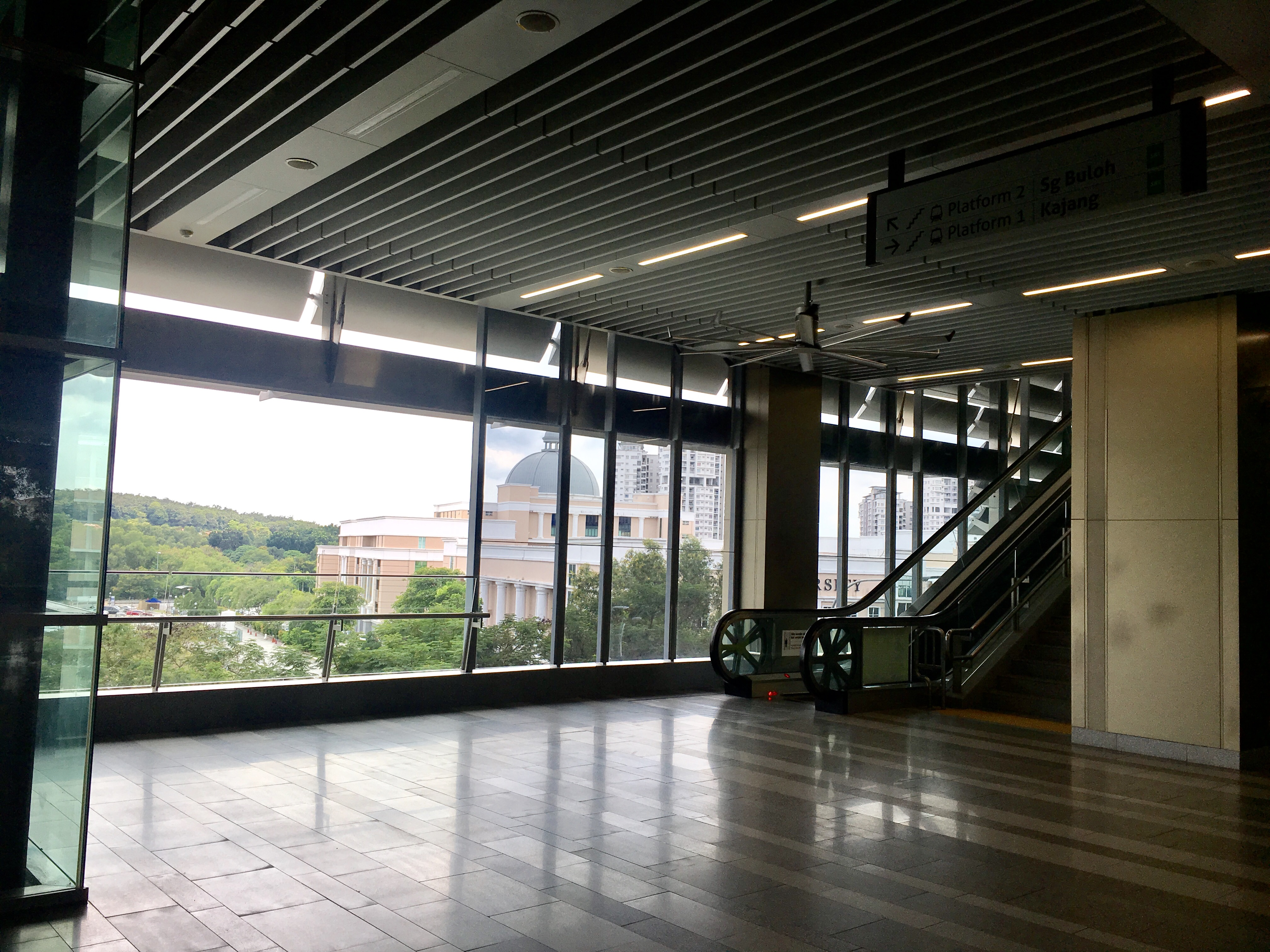
Paid area of the concourse with SEGi University in the background

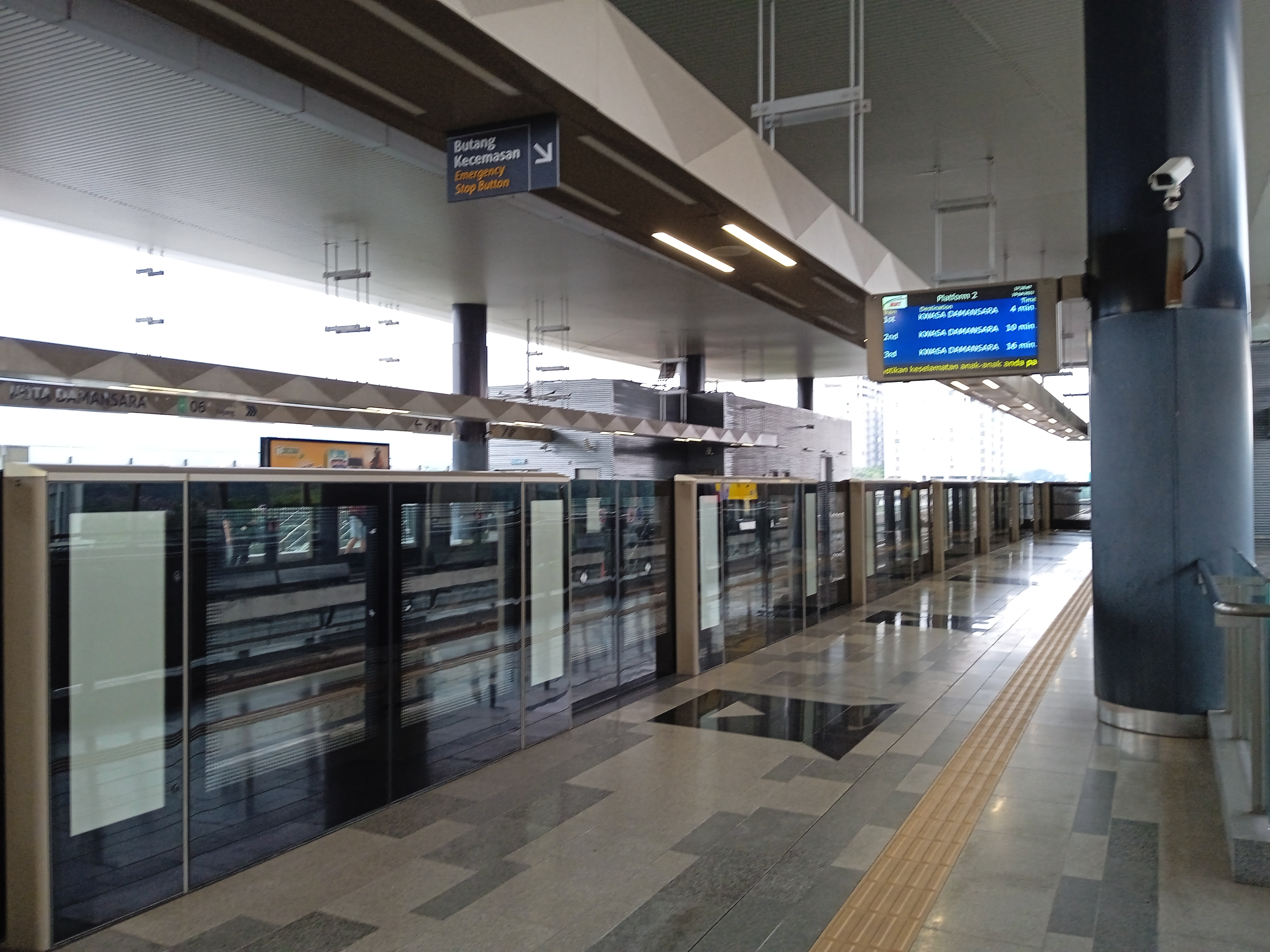
View of the Kwasa Damansara-bound platform

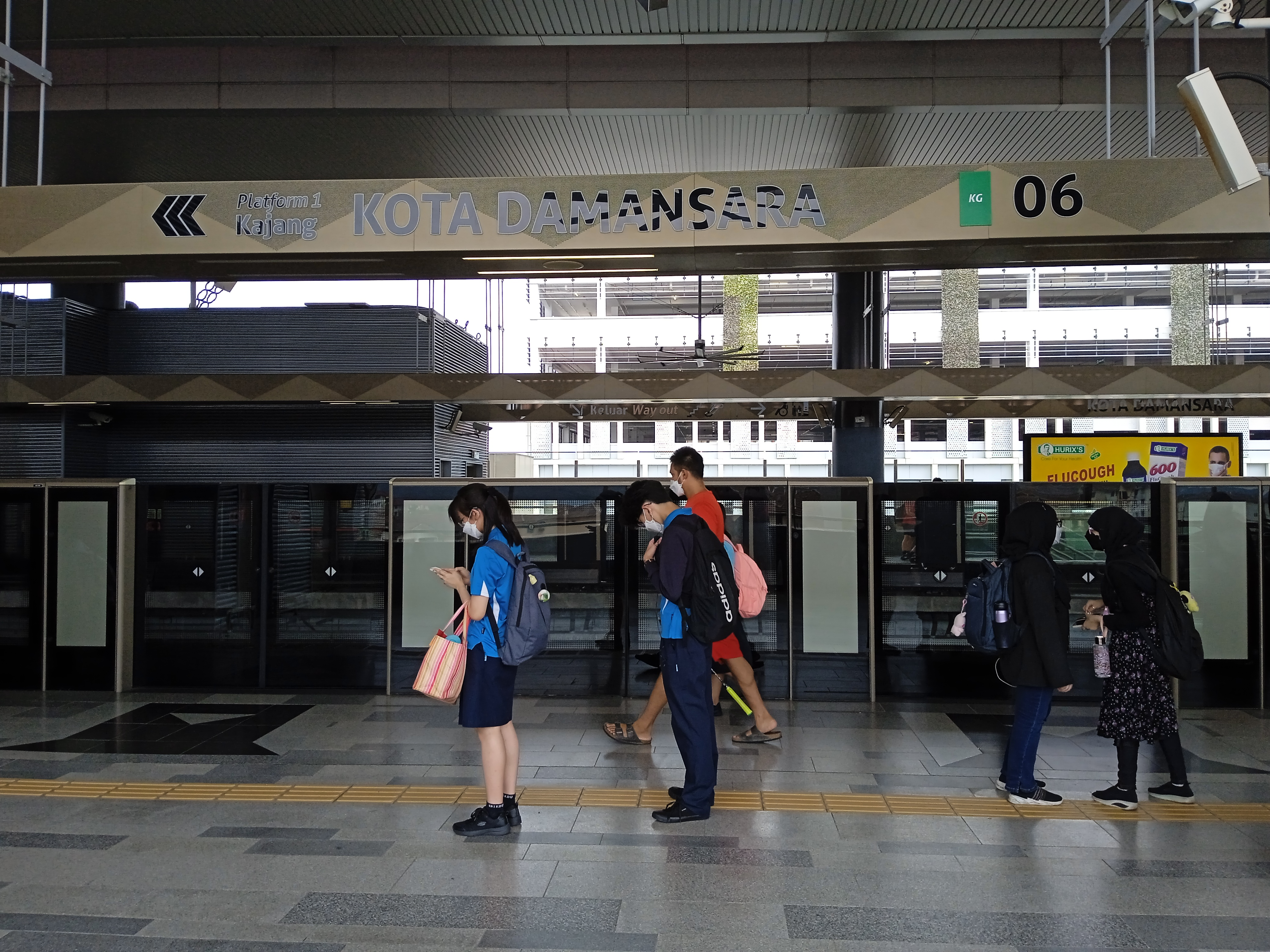
Kajang-bound platform

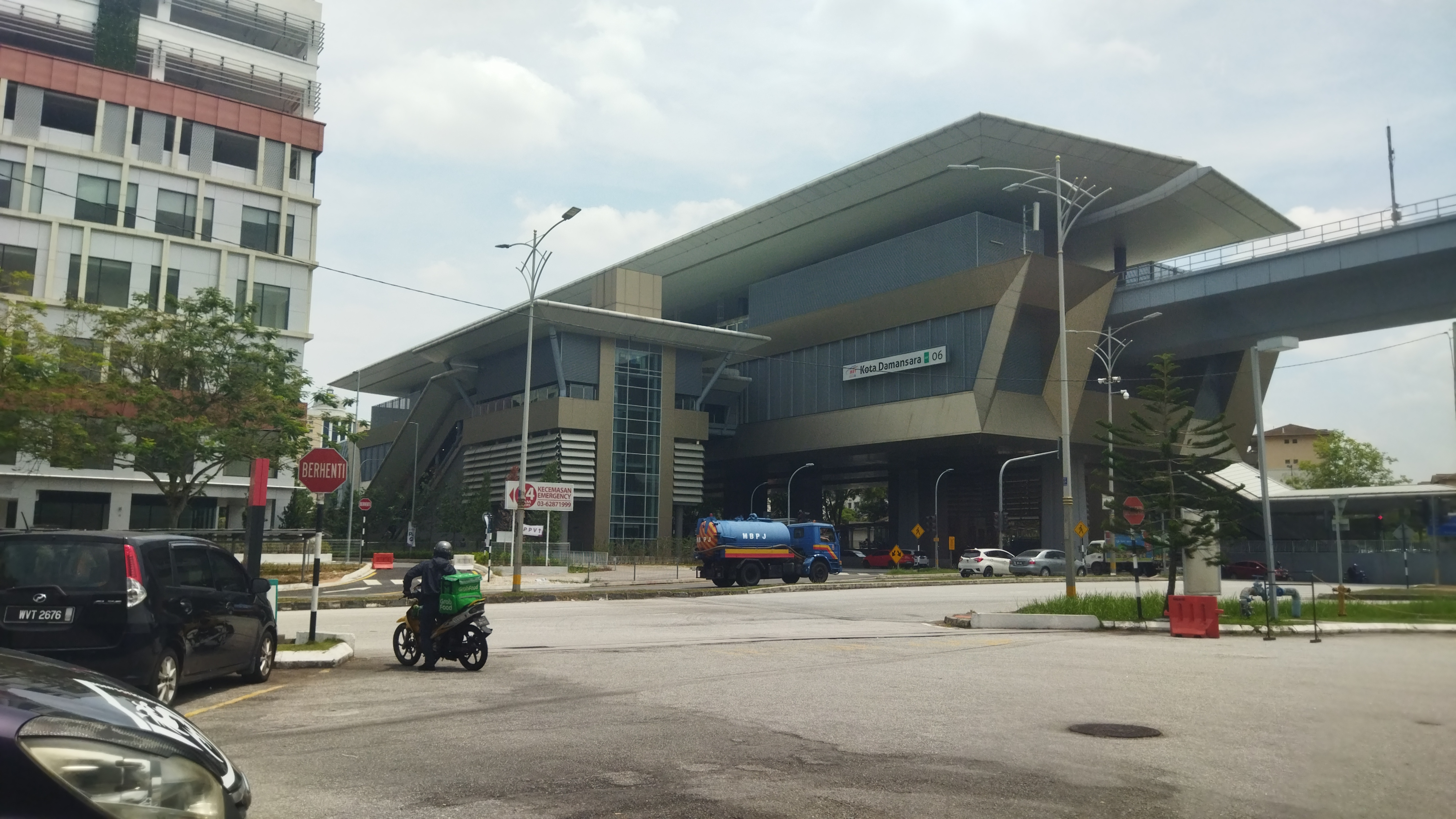
View of the station from Petronas Kota Damansara

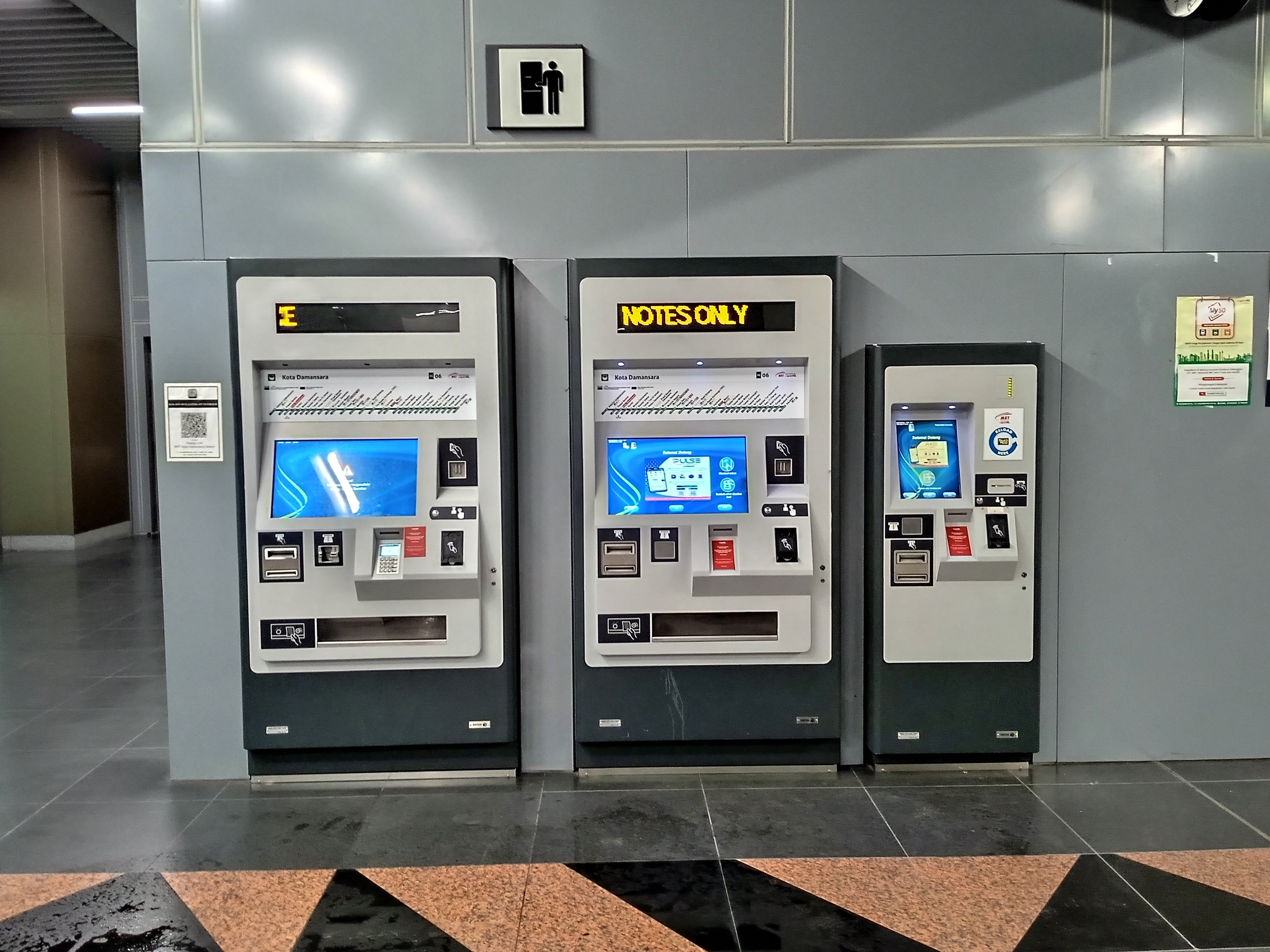
Tickets machine at concourse of station

== History ==
At the early stages of the project before the finalisation of station names, the MRT station was referred to by its working name PJU5 MRT Station. The switch to the name Kota Damansara caused some confusion as there was another station that had "Kota Damansara" as its working name, which was later given name Kwasa Damansara.

== Bus Services ==
=== Feeder bus service ===
With the opening of the Kajang Line, feeder buses also began operating linking the station with several housing and industrial areas in Kota Damansara. The feeder buses operate from the station's feeder bus stop adjacent to the station.

Route No.	Origin	Desitination	Via	Connecting to
T805	KG06 Kota Damansara	Kota Damansara Sections 4 & 5	Jalan Camar 4/1; Jalan Kenanga; Persiaran Kenanga; Jalan Sepah Puteri 5/1	780, 802
T806	KG06 Kota Damansara station	Selangor Science Park	Persiaran Surian; Jalan Teknologi	Terminus

=== Other buses ===
Route No.	Origin	Desitination	Via
780	KJ16 KG16 Pasar Seni	Section 8, Kota Damansara	Jalan Tun Tan Cheng Lock; Jalan Tun Sambanthan (KL Sentral); Jalan Bangsar; KJ16 Bangsar; FT 2 Federal Highway; Jalan Utara; Jalan Semangat; Jalan SS 2/55; Damansara–Puchong Expressway (Bandar Utama); Persiaran Surian; KG08 Mutiara Damansara; KG07 Surian; KG06 Kota Damansara (Entrance A for Kota Damansara-bound); Persiaran Mahogani; Jalan Pekaka

== See also ==
- MRT Kajang Line
- Kota Damansara
