= Persiaran Kenanga =

Road in Malaysia

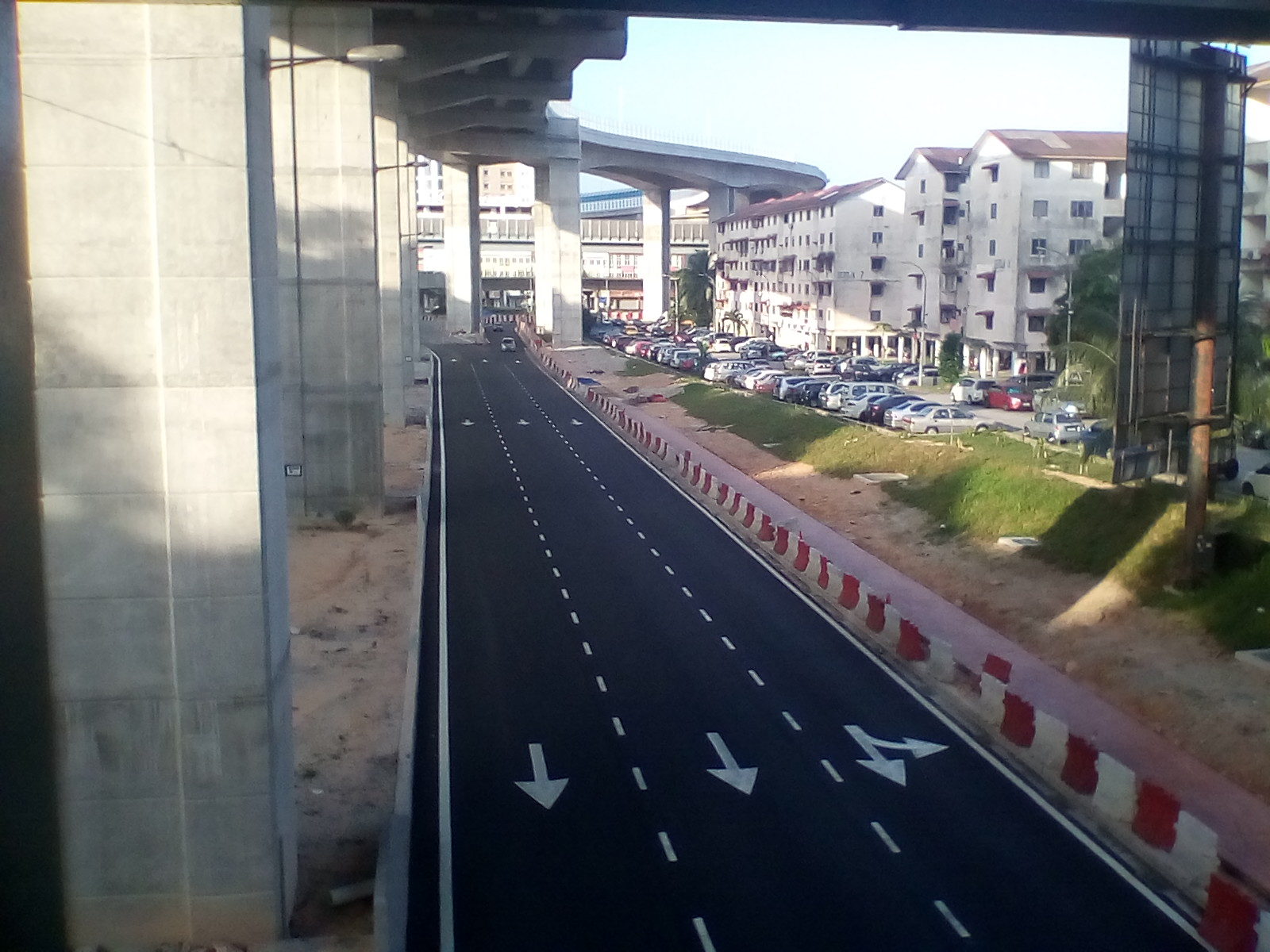

Route information
- Maintained by Petaling Jaya City Council

Major junctions
- West end: Persiaran Surian
- Persiaran Surian New Klang Valley Expressway / AH2 / AH141; Damansara–Shah Alam Elevated Expressway
- East end: Kota Damansara Interchange

Location
- Country: Malaysia
- Primary destinations: Ipoh, Klang

Highway system
- Highways in Malaysia; Expressways; Federal; State

Persiaran Kenanga is the municipal driveway (highway) in Kota Damansara, Petaling Jaya, Selangor, Malaysia. The driveway connects from Persiaran Surian to Kota Damansara Interchange of the New Klang Valley Expressway. This driveway is maintained by the Petaling Jaya City Council or Majlis Bandaraya Petaling Jaya (MBPJ).

== History ==
On 19 August 2018, one lane and U-Turn at Persiaran Kenanga and Persiaran Suria closed temporary for Damansara–Shah Alam Elevated Expressway constructions.

Onn 6 September 2019, an accident happened at Persiaran Surian to Kota Damansara Toll Plaza directions, leading delay about 35 minutes.

In Movement Control Order, Persiaran Kenanga become one of the alternative road.

== Junction lists ==
The entire route is located in Petaling District, Selangor.

Legend:

- I/C - Interchange, I/S - Intersection, RSA - Rest and service area, OBR - Overhead bridge restaurant, R/R - Restaurant and rest plaza, L/B - Layby, V/P - Vista point, TN - tunnel, T/P - Toll plaza, BR - Bridge
- C - Cloverleaf, S - Stack, T-A - Trumpet-A, T-B - Trumpet-B, DT - Directional-T/Y, SDT - Semi-Directional-T/Y, P-Y - Partial-Y, D - Diamond, P-C - Partial cloverleaf, D-D - Diverging diamond, D-R - Direct ramp

Km	Exit	Name	Destinations	Notes
		Persiaran Surian I/C	Persiaran Surian – Section 7 until 11, Sungai Buloh, Chocolate Museum @ Kota Damansara, Section 1 until 4, Mutiara Damansara, Damansara, Petaling Jaya	T-junctions with ramp to Sungai Buloh
		Jalan Cecawi 6 I/S	Jalan Cecawi 6 – Section 6	LILO Eastbound
		Jalan Camar 4/1 I/S	Jalan Camar 4/1 – Section 4	LILO Westbound
		Jalan Sepah Puteri 5/1 I/S	Jalan Sepah Puteri 5/1 – Section 5	T-junctions
		Jalan Camar I/S	Jalan Camar – Section 4	LILO Westbound
	3108A	DASH I/C	Damansara–Shah Alam Elevated Expressway – Kuala Lumpur, Mont Kiara, Kepong, Putrajaya, Damansara Perdana	Eastbound off-ramp towards east only
Restricted Routes; Heavy vehicles (laden and unladen heavy vehicles weighing 10,000 kg or more) are not allowed to enter the expressway Monday to Friday (except public holidays) 6:30 am to 9:30 am Shah Alam - Jalan Duta (km 9.3 - km 31)
	T/P	Kota Damansara Toll Plaza	Touch 'n Go SmartTAG MyRFID MyRFID SmartTAG Touch 'n Go	
	BR	Bridge		
	107	Kota Damansara-NKVE I/C	New Klang Valley Expressway / AH2 / AH141 – Ipoh, Sungai Buloh, Kuala Lumpur, Kuantan, Klang, Shah Alam, Putrajaya, Kuala Lumpur International Airport, Johor Bahru	Trumpet interchange
