= Bandar Utama =

Township in Petaling, Selangor, Malaysia

Coordinates: 3.1378804°N 101.6105594°E

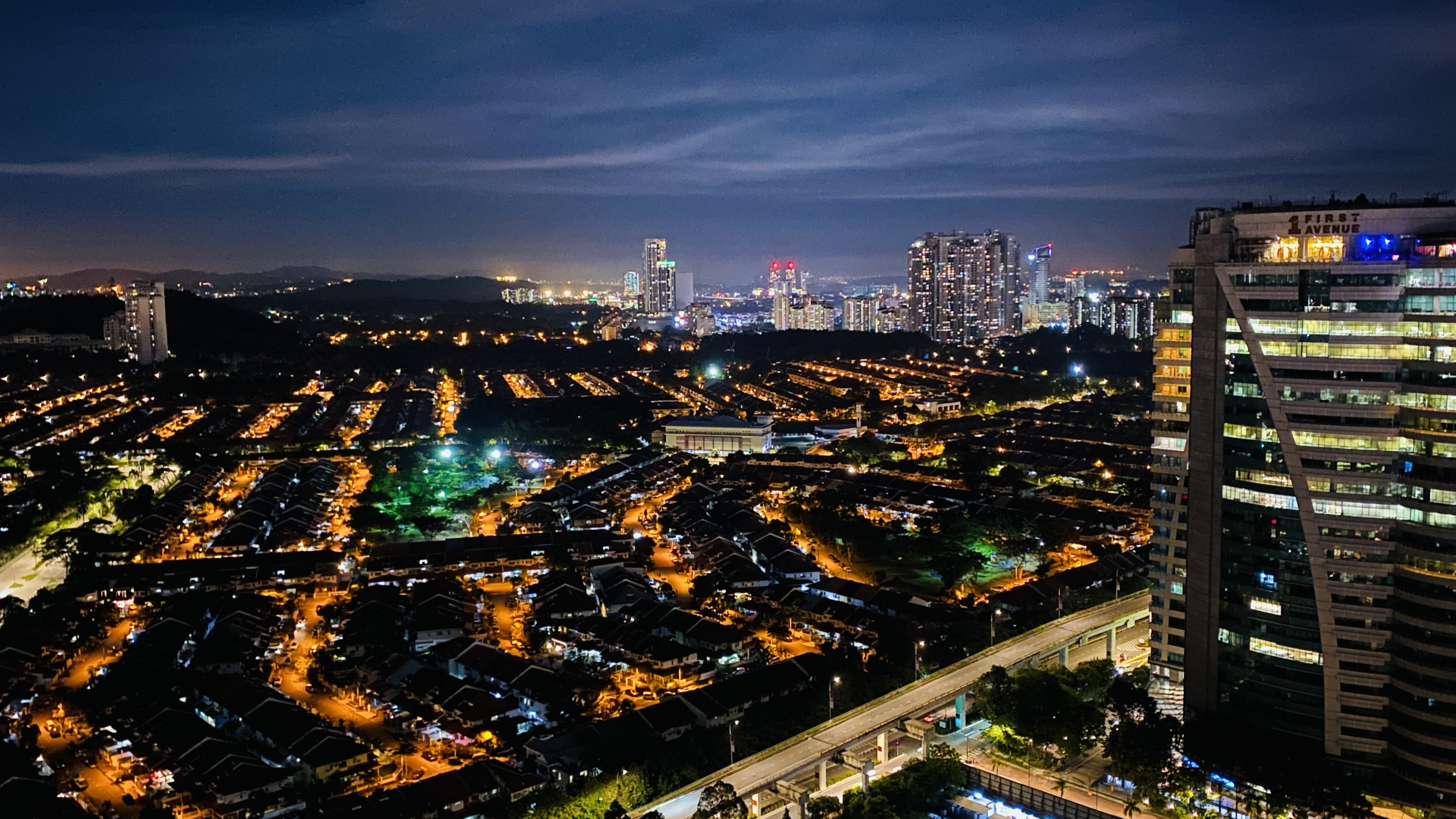
Bandar Utama at night

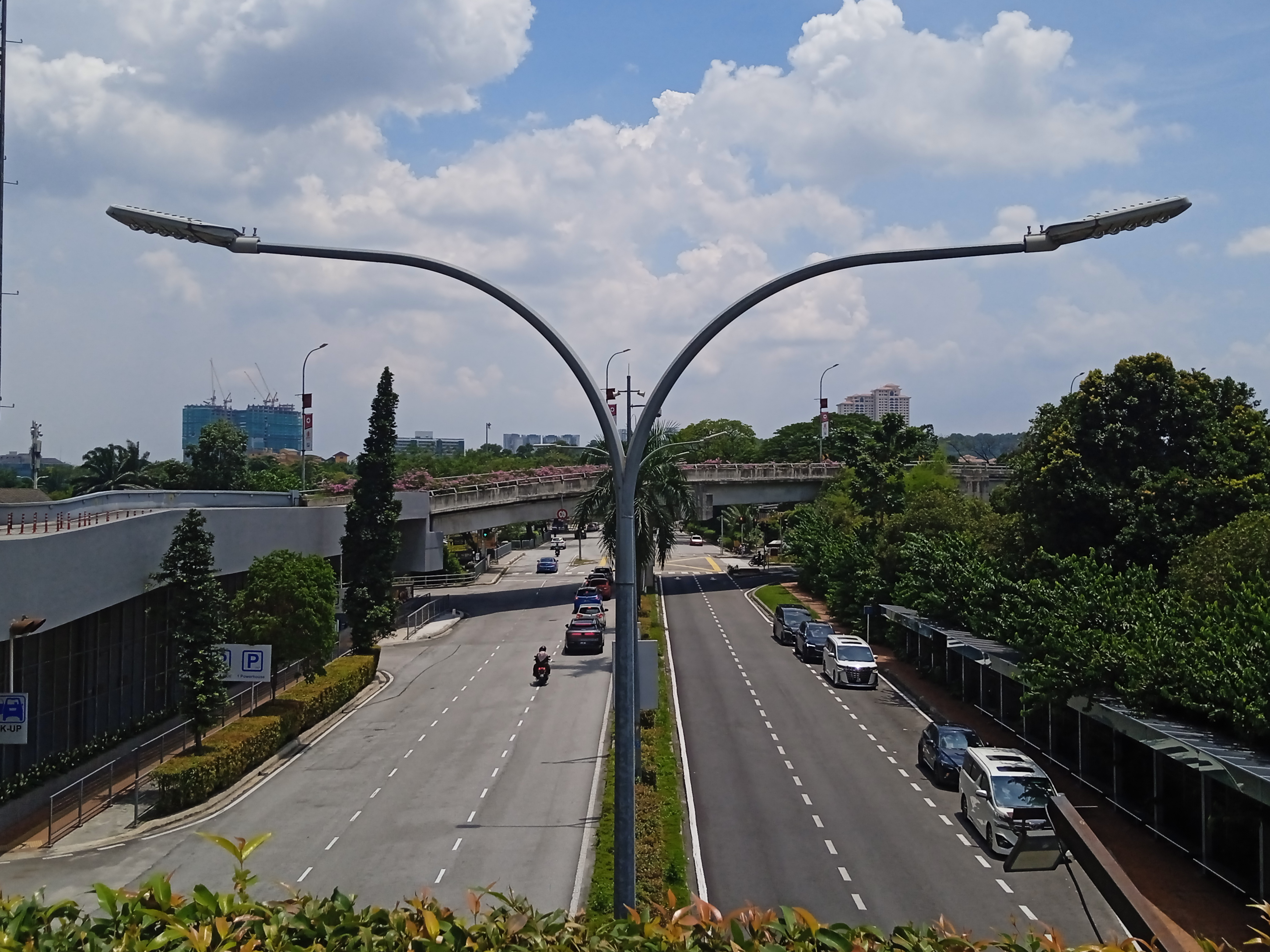
Bandar Utama Drive (Persiaran Bandar Utama) in Bandar Utama, in 2026

Bandar Utama Damansara is an affluent residential township and suburb located within the Sungai Buloh mukim (subdivision) of the Petaling District in Selangor, Malaysia. Developed by the See Hoy Chan Holdings Group, the township covers approximately 1,000 acres and is characterized by its meticulously planned residential precincts, ranging from BU1 to BU12.

Until the early 1990s, the area consisted largely of the Effingham Estate, a vast oil palm plantation. Its transformation into a modern residential suburb was part of a strategic master plan to meet the growing demand for high-end housing in the Klang Valley. Today, it is considered one of the most prestigious addresses in Petaling Jaya. Administratively, Bandar Utama Damansara and the adjacent Kampung Sungai Kayu Ara constitute the PJU 6 section of the city.[1]

The township is a major commercial engine for the region, anchored by the 1 Utama Shopping Centre. Consistently ranked among the largest shopping malls in the world, the complex serves as a primary hub for retail, dining, and professional services, attracting millions of visitors annually.

== Demographics ==
As of 2004, it is estimated that there are 59,040 people residing in Bandar Utama Damansara. The population had risen to roughly 100,000 people by 2021. The primary residents appear to be Chinese followed by Indian and Malay. However, there were nearby squatter settlements of illegal immigrants in the neighbouring Kayu Ara village which are enclosed by Bandar Utama Damansara and Damansara Utama. They have now mostly been relocated to nearby low-cost flats and their squatter houses demolished to make way for legal developments.

== History ==
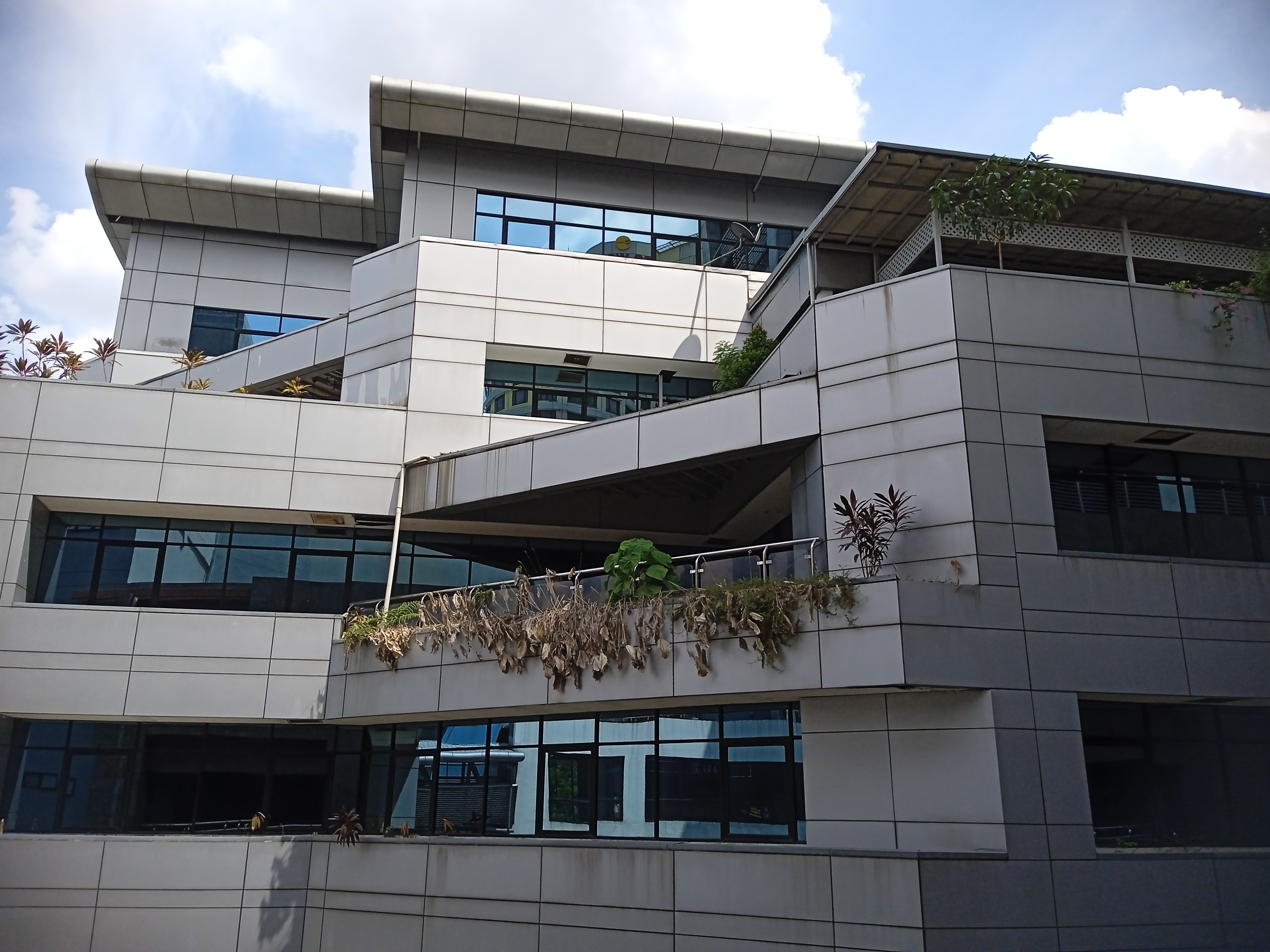
Sri Pentas building from One World Hotel

Until 1991, the Bandar Utama Damansara area consisted of palm oil estates with a population fewer than 100 people. Development of Bandar Utama Damansara began in the early 1990s under the company named See Hoy Chan Holdings Sdn. Bhd., and an attempt to modernise the area was made, with the opening of Sri Pentas, TV3's broadcast centre was officially opened on 22 October 1996, as well as the 1 Utama Shopping Centre, which became increasingly well known after the Jaya Jusco chain of department stores, presently known as AEON, moved its Taman Tun Dr. Ismail, Kuala Lumpur outlet to Bandar Utama Damansara in 1995.

With the opening of several new schools in 1997 and 1998, as well as the establishment of Kolej Bandar Utama, a tertiary institution, Bandar Utama Damansara continued to grow. In 2004, additional residential precincts of BU7, BU10 and BU6 (comprising 2½-storey houses) were completed. These are newer sections of Bandar Utama Damansara compared to the older sections, BU1 until BU4, which were completed in phases beginning from 1991 until 1996.

== Geography ==
Bandar Utama Damansara is roughly 1000 acres (4 km^{2}) in size, and is divided into 12 sections ranging from BU1 to BU12. These sections are served by roads, e.g. Jalan BU2/5 where "Jalan" is a Malay word meaning road, BU2 is the section and 5 is the road number. Houses on one side of the road have even numbers, and the other side odd numbers, so one side of a road will consist of houses with numbers 2, 4, 6, 8 and so forth while the opposite will have houses numbered 1, 3, 5, 7 and so on.

A bridge over the Sprint Expressway joins the two parts of Bandar Utama Damansara, sections BU1 until BU10 and BU11 with BU12, which are separated by the expressway.

== Places ==
=== Places of worship ===
The Bandar Utama Buddhist Society was registered on 28 March 2000. Uttama Bodhi Vihara, located in BU3, is an iconic building that is the home of the Society. Today, it is known to many Buddhists throughout the Klang Valley.

Until recently, there has not been a church in Bandar Utama Damansara. Most Charismatics opted for either the Glad Tidings Assembly of God Church, the Damansara Utama Methodist Church, or the PJEFC which are all located in Seksyen 13, Petaling Jaya, or the Grace Assembly located in Taman SEA (SEA Park). Roman Catholics who live in the area tend to worship at the Church of St. Ignatius, near Kampung Chempaka (Cempaka Village) or Kristus Aman, located in Taman Tun Dr Ismail. However, in August 2017, Victory Church, a Foursquare Gospel Church, moved into Centrepoint Mall.

There is a surau (prayer hall) for Muslims at BU3, and the village of Kayu Ara has a mosque. Since 2016, there is also a huge mosque named Masjid Bandar Utama just beside the BU12 residential area.

=== Education ===
There are 3 national primary schools, a Chinese primary school (Puay Chai 2) and a Tamil primary school in Bandar Utama Damansara. There are also four secondary schools. The first primary school was opened near BU12 in 1998, but as of 2004 had begun to languish due to the opening of primary schools on the other side of Bandar Utama Damansara.

The first secondary school, SMK Bandar Utama was also opened around the same time. The school has enjoyed an increase in media coverage particularly due to their performance in the annual The Star National Best School Newspaper Competition; in which the 2003 class of 4 Adil won runner-up. The school was also recently involved in the Student Exchange Programme held between Phuay Chai Secondary School, Singapore and SMK Bandar Utama which had gained the approval from the Ministry of Education with the aim to foster stronger relations between the schools in its neighbouring countries. This programme had also been highlighted in stuff@school pullout of The Star newspaper.

In early 2007, the school beat SMK Bandar Utama Damansara (4) and SMK Damansara Jaya in the Tan Sri Datuk Wira Abdul Rahman Arshad cup; in the first and second rounds. Against SMK Damansara Jaya, the school's third speaker was named Best Speaker. The school's Drama Team landed third place at a drama competition for the Damansara zone; with their comedy The Poser Dilemma.

There is a propensity for some parents to school their children outside Bandar Utama Damansara, particularly for those living on the BU11/BU12 side, who tend to send their children to the Tropicana primary or secondary schools in Sunway Damansara, or the primary and secondary schools at Damansara Utama and Damansara Jaya.

There is also First City University College, formerly known as KBU International College (KBU), a private tertiary institution and the British International School, Kuala Lumpur that follows the British educational curriculum in Malaysia.

For early childhood development centres or kindergartens, there are a few such as Smart Reader Kids Bandar Utama Damansara which is located at a corner lot of Jalan BU6/12.

=== Community Centre ===
There is a community centre completed in the year 2005 situated between BU6 and BU3 next to Puay Chai 2 school. This community centre contains a community hall, a football (soccer) field, basketball/volleyball court and a few indoor badminton courts. It was built as a trade-off for not building low-cost houses. Many residents like to play games at the facilities.

=== Commercial complexes ===
Residents of Bandar Utama Damansara tend to shop at the 1 Utama shopping mall, the second-largest mall in Malaysia. 1 Utama is located at the far end of the BU1-BU10 side (right beside Damansara–Puchong Expressway), and quite a distance from BU11 and BU12. It is tenanted by almost every international brand, and two large cineplexes with a total of 24 screens. A significant number of international tourists also shop at 1 Utama. It has been well patronised since its opening in 1995, allowing it to more than double its size since then. As of 2004, it spans more than 5,000,000 square feet (460,000 m^{2}), making it one of the largest malls in Malaysia.

Centrepoint Bandar Utama, a much smaller commercial complex is also frequented by those who do not feel like travelling to the far end of Bandar Utama Damansara. It is located in the heart of the neighbourhood, and is much more cosier than 1 Utama. It thrives in particular with officeworkers in a hurry having their lunch breaks, as well as students from the three secondary schools within walking distance of it. It is also right next to a McDonald's drive-through restaurant

A Tesco outlet, the Ikano Power Centre, the Curve mall and the largest IKEA outlet in Southeast Asia were opened in the adjacent township of Mutiara Damansara. This has provided even more choices to the residents of Bandar Utama Damansara. There are also free bus services from the Curve to Bintang Walk, and from 1 Utama to Sri Hartamas.

=== Accommodation ===
There is a 5-star hotel completed in 2007 named One World Hotel. There are 438 rooms in the hotel.

== Transportation ==
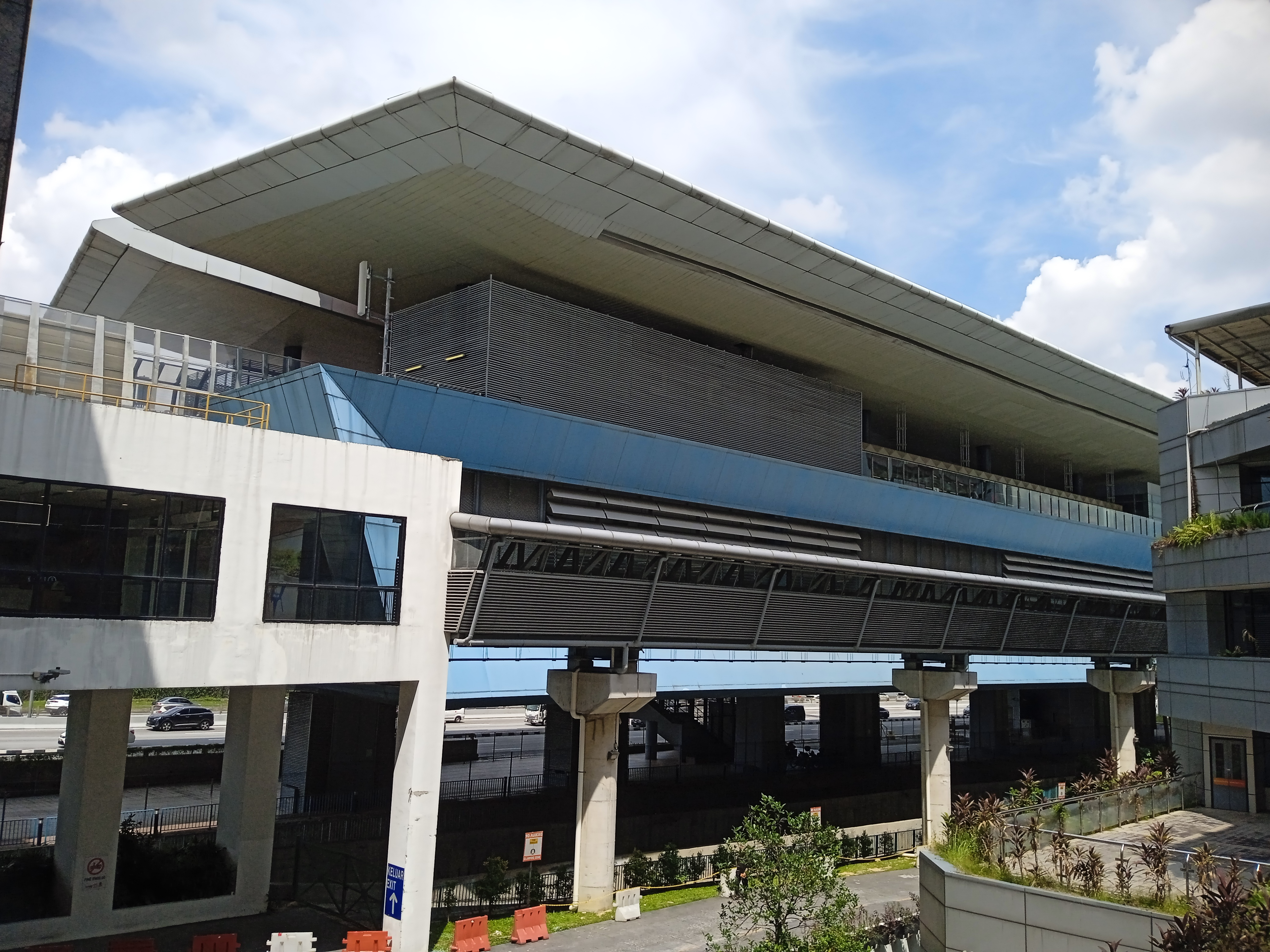
Exterior view of Bandar Utama MRT station from former connection walkway from the station to the 1 Utama, in 2026

Bandar Utama Damansara is served by a mass rapid transit (MRT) station, Bandar Utama, on the MRT Kajang Line. The station is directly linked with the One World Hotel/1 Utama complex and the 1Powerhouse building where the park and ride bays and feeder bus stop are located. In the future, the station will also serve as the terminus of the new LRT Shah Alam Line.

There are two MRT feeder bus routes running from the 1 Powerhouse bus stop, covering parts of Bandar Utama Damansara as well as neighbouring neighbourhoods. Rapid KL MRT feeder bus route T811 (MRT Bandar Utama–Mutiara Tropicana), and T812 (MRT Bandar Utama–Kampung Sungai Penchala and TTDI North), serve as the first-last mile connectivity in neighbourhood in Bandar Utama to Bandar Utama station. Bandar Utama also has one bus hub, Bandar Utama bus hub, located near 1 Utama.

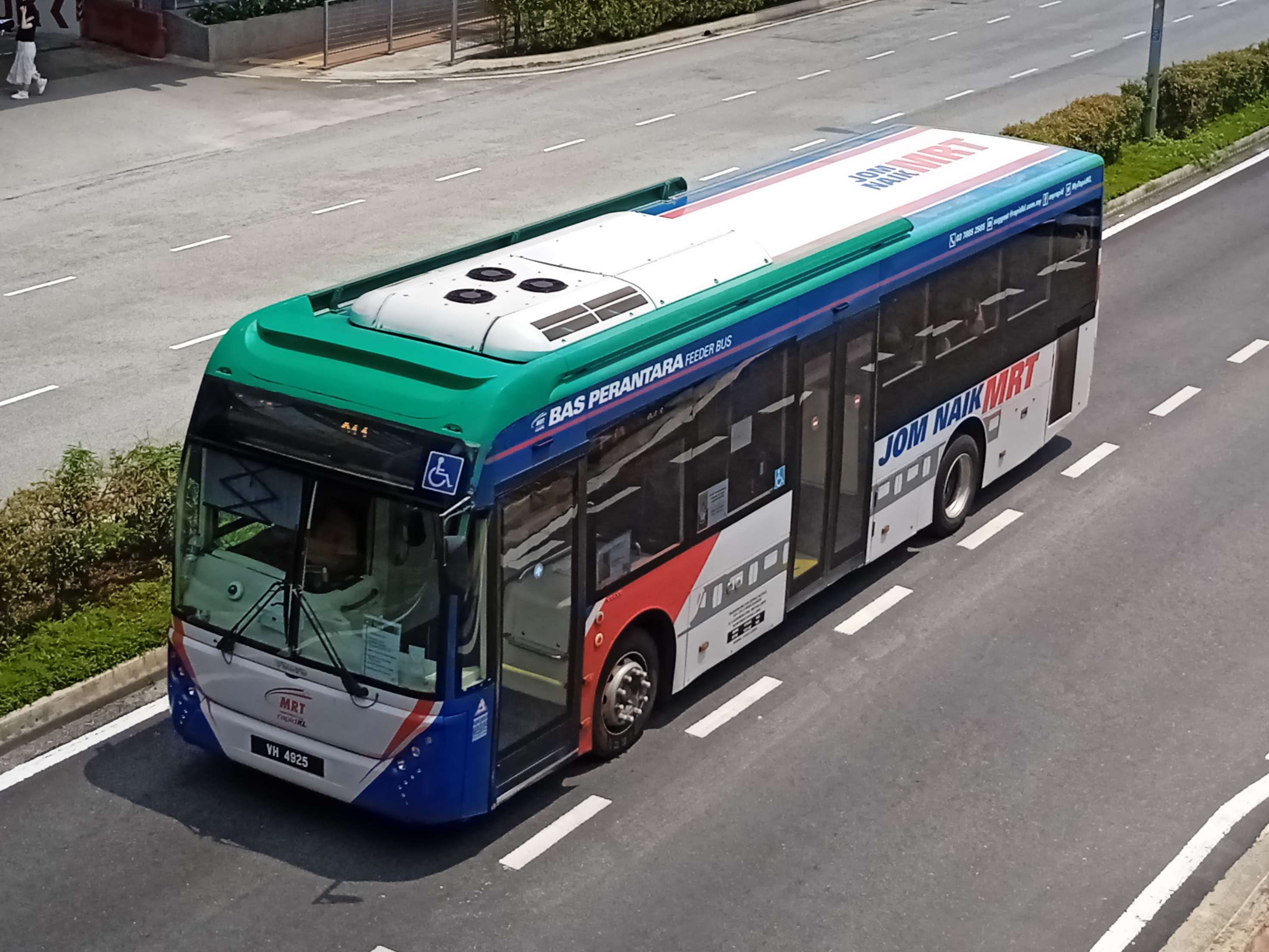
Rapid KL MRT Feeder Bus route T812 along Persiaran Bandar Utama in Bandar Utama, in 2026

There are also frequent buses to and from Kelana Jaya on the LRT Kelana Jaya Line. These buses, which are provided by 1 Utama, depart from the 1 Utama New Wing bus stop. From this bus stop, there are also Rapid KL buses to and from Kuala Lumpur and Putrajaya.

Bandar Utama Damansara is served by both the New Klang Valley Expressway (NKVE) and the Damansara-Puchong Expressway (LDP).

== Administration ==
Bandar Utama Damansara, like most of Damansara, falls under the jurisdiction of the Majlis Bandaraya Petaling Jaya (Petaling Jaya City Council).

== See also ==
- Bandar Utama bus hub
