= Kampung Sungai Kayu Ara =

Human settlement in Malaysia

Coordinates: 3.13272°N 101.6121074°E

Kampung Sungai Kayu Ara is a small village in the Petaling Jaya Utara (PJU6) section of Petaling Jaya, Selangor, Malaysia. This village is located between Bandar Utama Damansara, Damansara Jaya and Damansara Utama. It shares the postcode 47400 with Damansara Utama which lies to the east and adjacent to PJU6.
