= Al Mujaheddin Mosque =

Mosque in Petaling, Selangor, Malaysia

- Masjid Al Mujaheddin
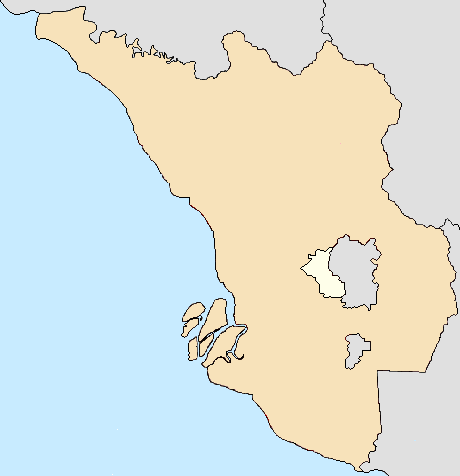
- Location within Petaling Jaya

Religion
- Affiliation: Islam
- Branch/tradition: Sunni

Location
- Location: Petaling Jaya, Selangor, Malaysia
- Interactive map of Al Mujaheddin Mosque
- Coordinates: 3°08′20.2″N 101°37′13.6″E

Architecture
- Type: Mosque

The Al Mujaheddin Mosque (Malay: Masjid Al Mujaheddin), also Masjid Mujahidin, is a mosque in Damansara Utama, Selangor, Malaysia. Located near the roundabout of Damansara Utama where Damansara Uptown is, the Al Mujaheddin Mosque is more than just a place of worship. In the compound, there is an Islamic school going by the name SRA Al-Mujahiddeen.

SRA stands for Sekolah Agama Rakyat or People's Religious School. It is where some Muslim residents send their children to get in-depth teachings on Islamic faith.

== Background ==
The mosque originally started in an old wooden structure on land belonging to the Fire Department. The popularity of Tok Guru Abdul Hadi Awang helped to expand the congregation significantly. The government eventually approved the mosque's application for the land in Damansara Utama to build a new concrete structure.

== See also ==
- Islam in Malaysia
- GoogleMaps StreetView of Masjid Al-Mujahideen
- GoogleMaps PhotoSphere of Masjid Al-Mujahideen Main Prayer Hall
