= Damansara Utama =

Suburb of Petaling Jaya, Malaysia

Coordinates: 3.1349888°N 101.6246825°E

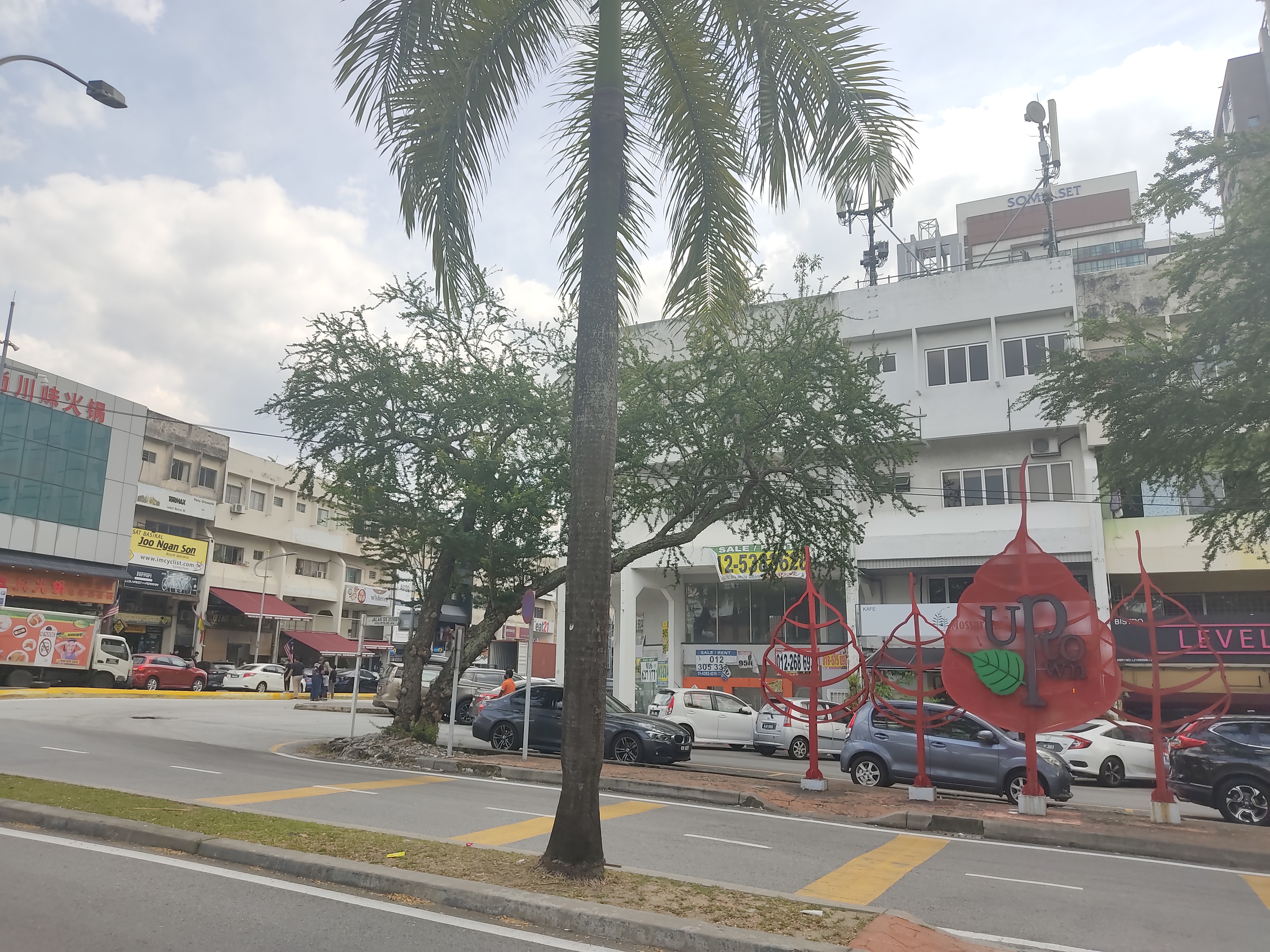
Damansara Utama commercial area

Damansara Utama is a suburb of Petaling Jaya, Selangor, Malaysia. The suburb is divided into two sections, SS20 in the east and SS21 in the west which are separated in the middle by the Damansara–Puchong Expressway, a heavily used six-lane expressway. It has a population of about 142,000 people.

It is also within the Sungai Buloh mukim (subdivision) of the Petaling District.

== Commerce ==
The Uptown in SS21 is the commercial hub of Damansara Utama, which houses offices, restaurants, opticians, fashion houses and other miscellaneous goods.

There are major and foreign banks that have set up their branches in the area.

- CIMB Bank
- Maybank
- Public Bank
- RHB Bank
- AmBank
- Hong Leong Bank
- Alliance Bank
- Standard Chartered
- UOB
- OCBC
- HSBC

Damansara Utama has its own shopping mall known as The Starling opened in 2016. There are several other shopping complexes that are located in areas nearby such as 3 Damansara (formerly Tropicana City Mall) in SS2; 1 Utama in Bandar Utama Damansara; The Curve, IKEA, IPC Shopping Centre (formerly Ikano Power Centre) in Mutiara Damansara; and Atria Shopping Gallery (formerly The Atria) at neighbouring Damansara Jaya.

== Education ==
Primary and secondary education is provided by the Sekolah Kebangsaan Damansara Utama/Damansara Utama Primary school and SMK Damansara Utama/Damansara Utama Secondary School respectively. KDU (Kolej Damansara Utama) is in the vicinity.

== Healthcare ==
The Damansara Specialist Hospital is in the adjacent suburb of Damansara Kim along Jalan SS20/10. The hospital is managed by Kumpulan Perubatan (Johor) Sdn Bhd. It provides all the services, facilities and amenities of a modern hospital.

There are clinics and pharmacies in Damansara Utama closer to Uptown square.

== Religion ==
Residents practice Islam, Buddhism, Christianity, Hinduism, Confucianism, Taoism and others.

== Accessibility via public transport ==
=== Railways ===
SA2 Kayu Ara LRT Station (1 mile walk)

=== Buses ===
Damansara Utama is accessible via Rapid KL buses and taxis. Rapid KL buses which operate through Damansara Utama are as follows:

- 506 : Putrajaya Sentral - Bandar Utama
- 780 : HAB Pasar Seni - Section 8 Kota Damansara via SEA Park, SS2 Petaling Jaya - HAB Pasar Seni
- 802 : Kelana Jaya LRT - Section 6 Kota Damansara via Damansara Utama - Kelana Jaya LRT
- T813 : Taman Tun Dr Ismail MRT - Damansara Utama - Damansara Jaya - Taman Tun Dr Ismail MRT
- PJ05 : Bandar Utama - Damansara Utama - Damansara Jaya - SS2 Petaling Jaya - Taman Bahagia LRT

== Geography ==
The street known as Jalan SS20/1 and Jalan SS20/10 spans Damansara Utama and Damansara Kim; Jalan SS20/21 separates Damansara Utama from Damansara Kim and bisects Jalan SS20/1 and Jalan SS20/10. Jalan SS20/10 in Damansara Utama is a street with residential units only while Jalan SS20/10 in Damansara Kim boasts residential and commercial units. The units along Jalan SS20/21 in Damansara Utama are odd-numbered while the units in Damansara Kim are even-numbered.

Damansara Kim is a nickname for Damansara Utama opposite Tropicana City Mall.
