= SMK Taman SEA =

SMK Taman SEA SEA Park National Secondary School
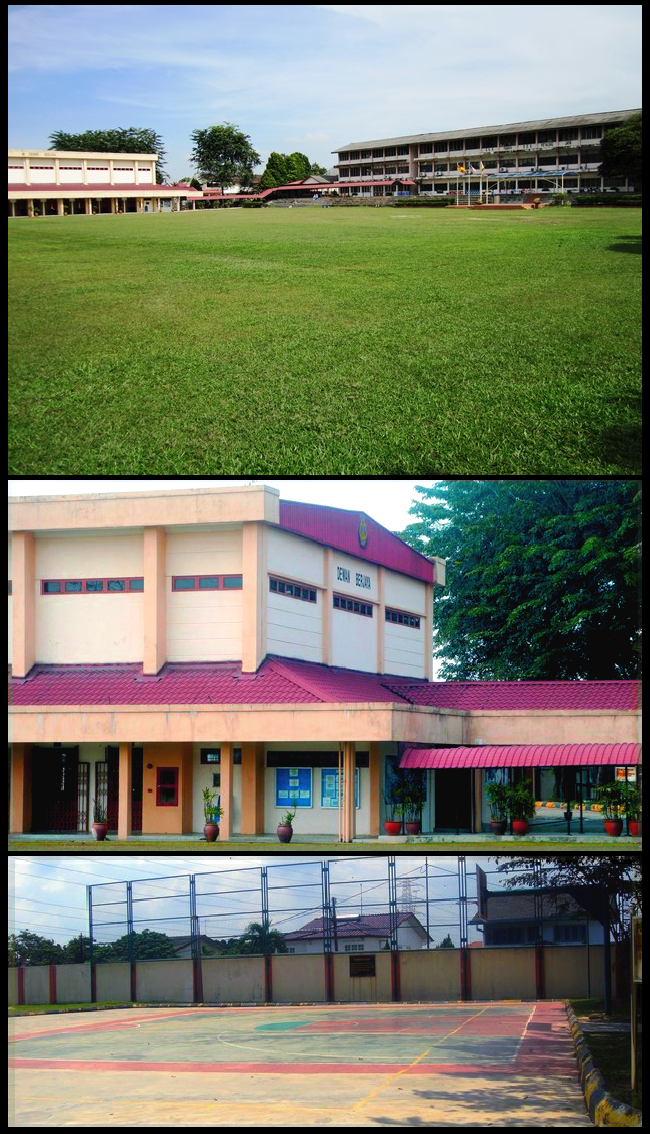
- Top to bottom; football field, school hall, multipurpose court.

Location
- Petaling Jaya, Selangor; Malaysia; 3.110525°N 101.616980°E

Information
- School type: Government public school, Government secondary school
- Motto: Awas Nilai Bertindak (See Evaluate Act)
- Established: 1976
- Status: Active
- Sister school: Sekolah Kebangsaan Taman SEA
- Session: Double
- Principal: Pn. Mona Asifah Binti Abdullah
- Staff: 121
- Teaching staff: 112
- Grades: Peralihan - Form 5
- Enrollment: 1700 (January 2012)
- Classes: 54
- Language: Malay language, English language
- Area: SS 2, Taman SEA
- Yearbook: Samudra
- Information: School code : BEB 8656
- Website: www.smktsea.com

Sekolah Menengah Kebangsaan Taman SEA is a secondary school situated in Petaling Jaya in Selangor, Malaysia. It is located between residential areas Kampung Tunku, SS2 and SEA Park.

== History ==
Construction began in 1975. It started with five classes per form. The school has 1700 students.

== School identity ==
=== School emblem ===
SMKTS logo

- Yellow symbolises loyalty,
- Triangle-shaped badge emphasises the unity in SMKTS,
- See, Evaluate, Act is the school's motto.
- The tiger symbolises strength.
- The rose symbolises love.

=== School anthem ===
SMKTS anthem music score
The school anthem was written by Peter Kannu and Ann Ong.

Awas nilai bertindak
Pegangan yang disanjung tinggi
Di sinilah inspirasi kita bertapak
Belajar berusaha dan berjasa
Sekolah Menengah Taman S.E.A.
Sekolah yang ku cintai
Putera-puteri diajar berbakti
Hidup tetap aman dan abadi
Taat setia dan amanah
Teladan yang berfaedah ini
Berganding bahu bekerjasama
Untuk nusa dan Negara

Literal translation

See evaluate act
The motto that we obey
Its here where we're inspired
Study strive and contribute
Seapark High School
The school I love
Sons and daughters are taught well
Live a peaceful life forever
Obedient, loyal and trustful
Our great role models
Side by side we work together
For our homeland and nation

== Principals ==
- 1976 – 1977: En David Koay
- 1978 – 1979: En Victor Wong
- 1980 – 1982: En Hooi Weng Fatt
- 1982 – 1984: Cik Marie Jeannie Low
- 1984 – 1985: En Abd Hadi bin Alias
- 1985 – 1987: En Harbajan Singh Sidhu
- 1987 – 1989: En Rusli bin Rasyikin
- 1989 – 1991: Tn Hj Mohd Hashim bin Zakaria
- 1992 – 1997: Pn Hjh Saleha bt Othman
- 1997 – 2005: Pn Hjh Fatimah bt Hj Ibrahim
- 2005 – 2009: Pn Zakiyah bt Daie
- 2010 - 2013: Pn Hjh Siti Masrah bt Napiah
- 2013 - 2015: Datin Hjh Zuraidah bt Hj Mohamad
- 2015 - 2020: Pn. Suryani Binti Ismail
- 2020 – 2022: Pn. Rossheta Binti Abd. Rahman
- 2022 - 2026: Pn. Mona Asifah Binti Abdullah

== Higher education ==
Although students can get Form 6 education, the majority of the students graduating attend colleges like Taylors, Sunway, Help or TARC, or pursue further studies at local matriculation centres.

== Achievements ==
The school won the National Robotics Competition in 2007.
