= 1 Utama =

Shopping mall in Petaling, Selangor, Malaysia

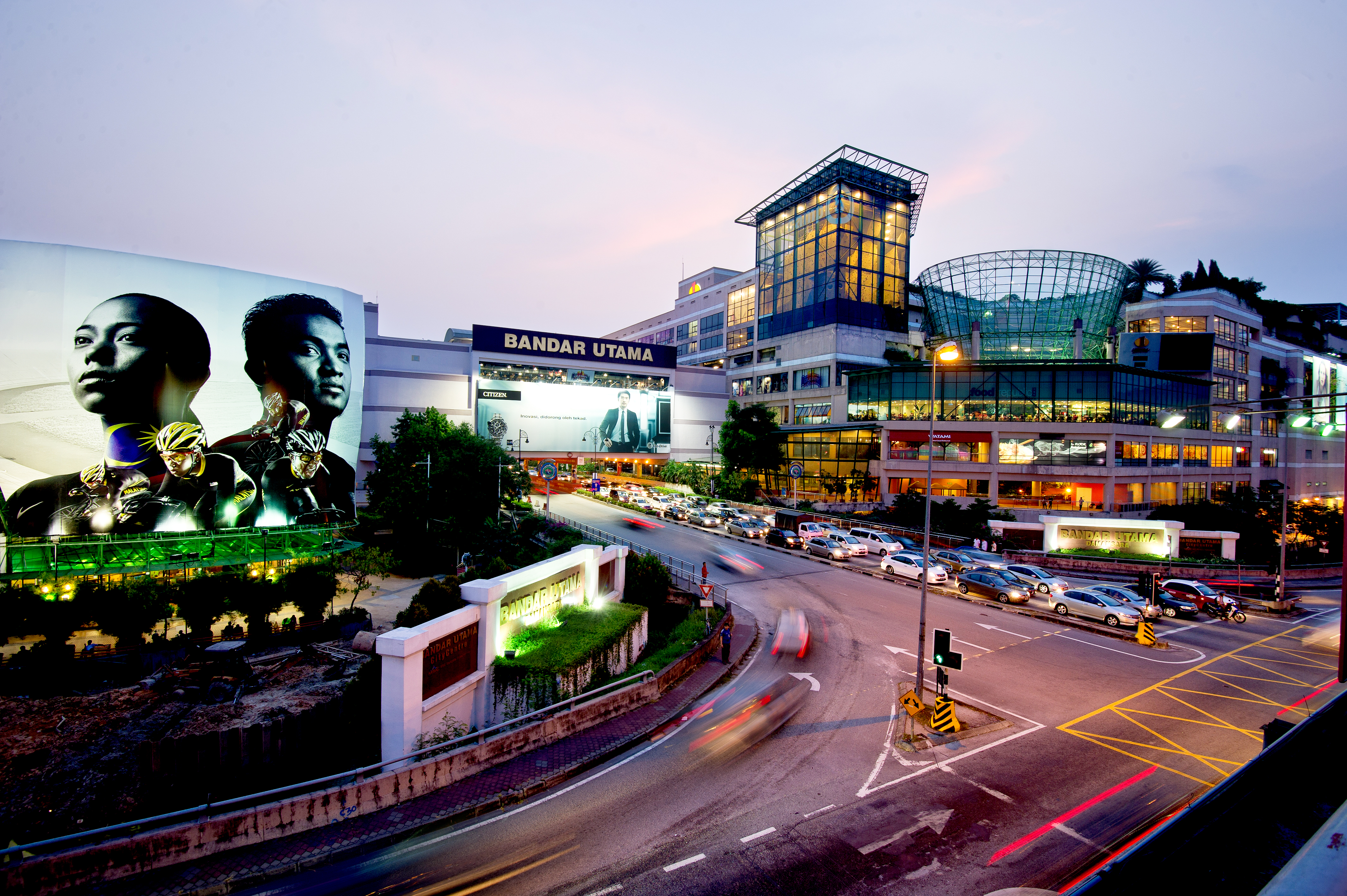
- 1 Utama Shopping Centre
- Alternative names: One Utama, 1U, OU

General information
- Status: Completed
- Type: Shopping mall
- Architectural style: Contemporary
- Location: Bandar Utama, 1, Lebuh Bandar Utama, Petaling Jaya, Malaysia
- Coordinates: 3°08′53.34″N 101°36′57.03″E
- Current tenants: AEON, Jaya Grocer, Parkson, TGV Cinemas, GSC Cinemas
- Opened: August 19, 1995; 31 years ago
- Renovated: June 2011; 15 years ago
- Cost: RM 89 million
- Renovation cost: RM 160 million
- Owner: Bandar Utama City Centre

Technical details
- Size: 5,590,000 sq ft (519,000 m^{2})
- Floor area: 2,190,000 sq ft (203,000 m^{2})

Design and construction
- Developer: See Hoy Chan Holdings
- Awards: EdgeProp Malaysia's Best Managed Property Awards 2019
- Designations: Gold
- Known for: Above 10 years retail category

Other information
- Number of stores: 713
- Number of anchors: 4
- Parking: 14,000
- Public transit: KG09 SA01 Bandar Utama station Bandar Utama bus hub

Website
- www.1utama.com.my

1 Utama is a shopping mall in Bandar Utama, Selangor, Malaysia, with an area of 5,590,000 square feet (519,000 m^{2}) and containing 713 stores. It is one of the largest shopping malls in Malaysia and the seventh-largest shopping mall in the world before IOI City Mall in Putrajaya surpassed it in 2022. The first phase of the mall, now known as the "Old Wing", was opened in September 1995. With the increase in customer traffic and demand for retail spaces inside the mall, a second phase called "New Wing" was added in 2003.

An additional expansion of 592,015 square feet (55,000.0 m^{2}) was added in 2018 with the addition of 1 Utama E. Today the mall houses multiple retail areas, restaurants, cafes, sports facilities, a rainforest, and a bus station with national and international services. Current anchor tenants of the mall include AEON Department Store and Supermarket, Jaya Grocer, and department store Parkson. The mall formerly housed Singaporean department store Tangs, Japanese department store Isetan, and the first IKEA store in Malaysia in 1996. The mall has received several awards, including Gold in EdgeProp Malaysia's Best Managed Property Awards 2019 (retail category) and the Platinum Award for Shopping Complex of the Year in the Retail World Excellence Awards 2006/07 edition.

== History ==
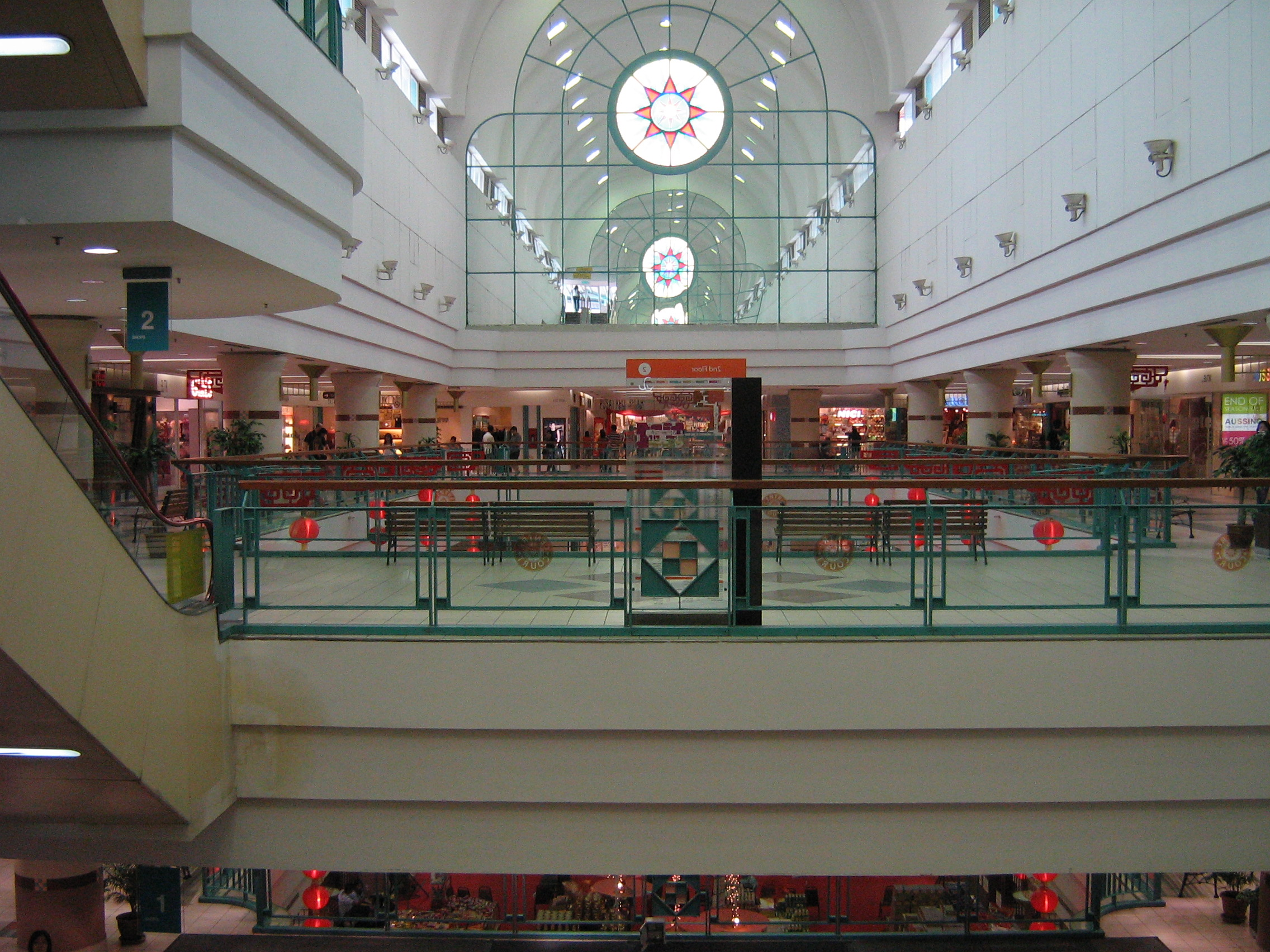
First phase or Old Wing section of the mall

In the 1990s, See Hoy Chan Holdings Group started developing a new town known as Bandar Utama comprising both residential and commercial areas. As market demand for this location surged, the developer planned to build a mall in this town. The developer looked for inspiration for such a mall in the United States in 1993 before designing the first phase of the mall known as the Old Wing today. As the developer believed that the mall should come with anchor tenants, they signed an agreement with AEON to open Jusco (later rebranded as AEON) as the main tenant in the mall.

The mall was officially opened on August 19, 1995 with all premises fully rented by various tenants. The cost of the construction of the first phase of the mall was RM89 million. The first IKEA store in Malaysia opened on April 25, 1996 in the mall with a good reception from customers during the first few days after opening. At that time, most IKEA products sold there were made in Malaysia including dining tables, chairs, coffee tables, venetian blinds, cutting boards, toys and bed frames. The IKEA store covered 7,431 square metres (79,990 sq ft) of space inside the mall. Due to increased demand for IKEA products, the store was relocated to a bigger space in Mutiara Damansara on August 14, 2003, becoming the largest IKEA store in Asia-Pacific at that time until it was surpassed by another store in Gwangmyeong, South Korea in 2014.

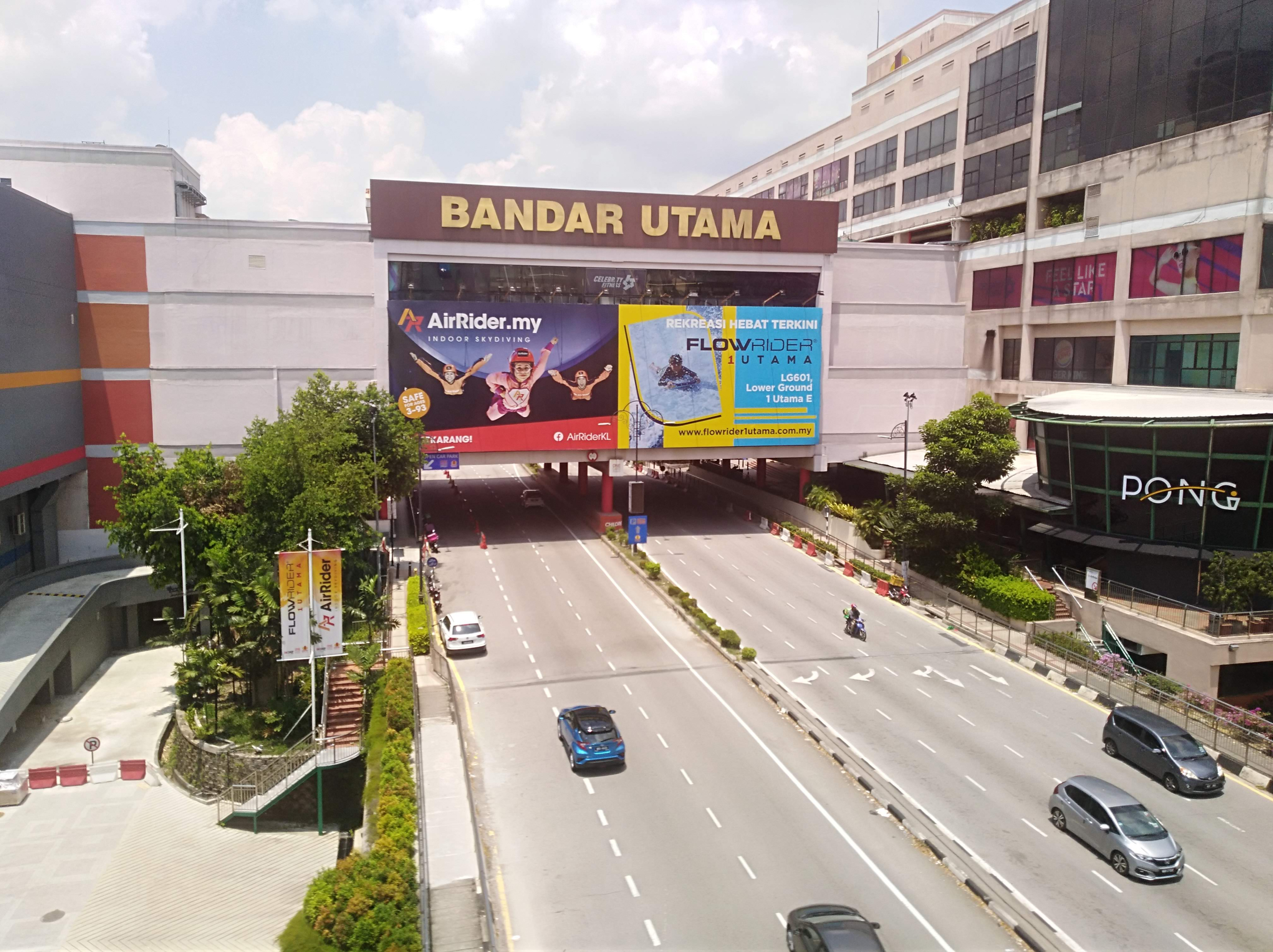
A covered bridge linking the Old Wing and New Wing was opened during the soft opening on December 13, 2003

As the mall faced increased demand for retail spaces, leading to a long tenant waiting list, the director of See Hoy Chan Holdings Group, Teo Chiang Kok, planned an expansion of the mall. This led to construction of the second phase, known as the New Wing, to further accommodate increasing numbers of customers. Construction cost RM300 million and increased the number of retail lots from 220 units to 600 units. The two blocks are connected by a covered pedestrian bridge. The new section also includes an aviary, zoo, diving pool and climbing wall. The mall soft-opened on December 13, 2003, with the grand opening taking place on April 2, 2004, officiated by the Sultan of Selangor, Sultan Sharafuddin Idris Shah. Ownership and management of the mall was transferred to Bandar Utama City Centre.

The first renovation of the first phase (or Old Wing) took place in June 2011, 16 years after it opened, and cost RM160 million. The renovation included a relocation of the Jusco supermarket to the new area, additions of cinema screens, and a new entrance to the 1 First Avenue office building. An additional expansion of 592,015 square feet (55,000.0 m^{2}) inside the mall included the third phase (known as 1 Utama E) which was opened on January 24, 2018. It features a surfing pool, a skydiving wind tunnel and several restaurants and cafes which aim to make the mall a multi-sport and entertainment venue alongside shopping. The mall also added 500 more parking bays and pedestrian access to Bandar Utama MRT station. Development of this phase cost RM150 million.

== Features ==
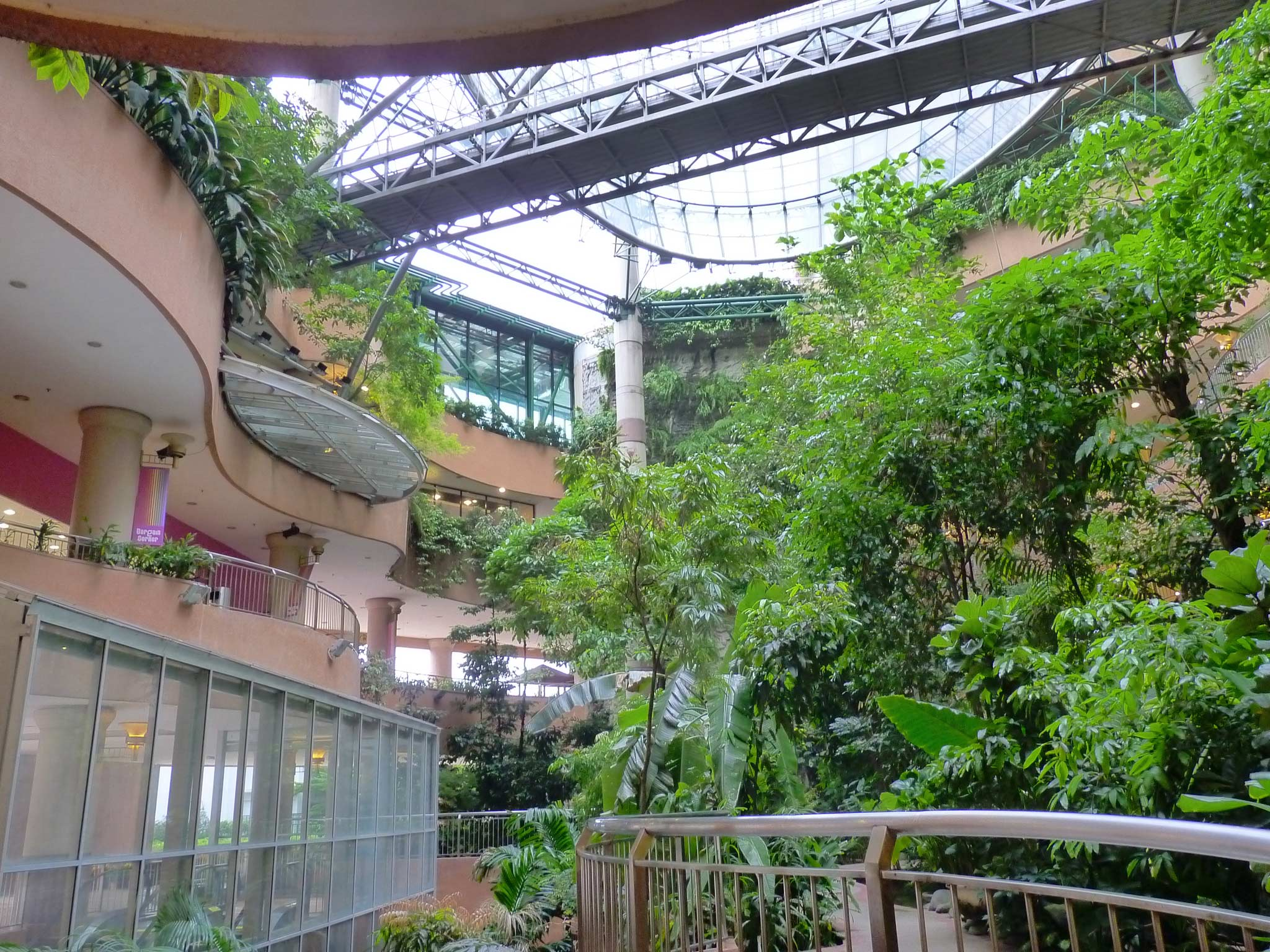
Rainforest in 1 Utama

1 Utama contains 203,000 square metres (2,190,000 sq ft) of retail space. Its 713 stores appeal to all economic strata, from department stores such as AEON and Parkson, to high-end international chains and multiple restaurants such as the Food District food court, Sushiro, KFC, McDonald's, Texas Chicken, Dunkin' Donuts and Burger King and two cinema chains, TGV Cinemas and GSC. This mall previously housed the first IKEA store in Malaysia, Cold Storage, MPH Bookstores. and Isetan department store. Aside from retail, 1 Utama offers sport amenities to the public including a bowling alley, baseball cage, climbing wall, surfing pool and skydiving wind tunnel. The rainforest inside the mall was grown on October 25, 2003. It was done by extracting a Tabebuia rosea tree from a nearby forest carried into the mall to create the forest canopy, whereas an additional 200 samplings of other species such as Alocasia, wild banana, Johanesteijsmannia, Aglaonema and Phyllagathis will be used as shrub layer. The rainforest opened to the public in November 2003. As of 2019, the mall attracts more than 33 million visitors annually, with peak traffic occurring during the holiday season.

== Transport ==
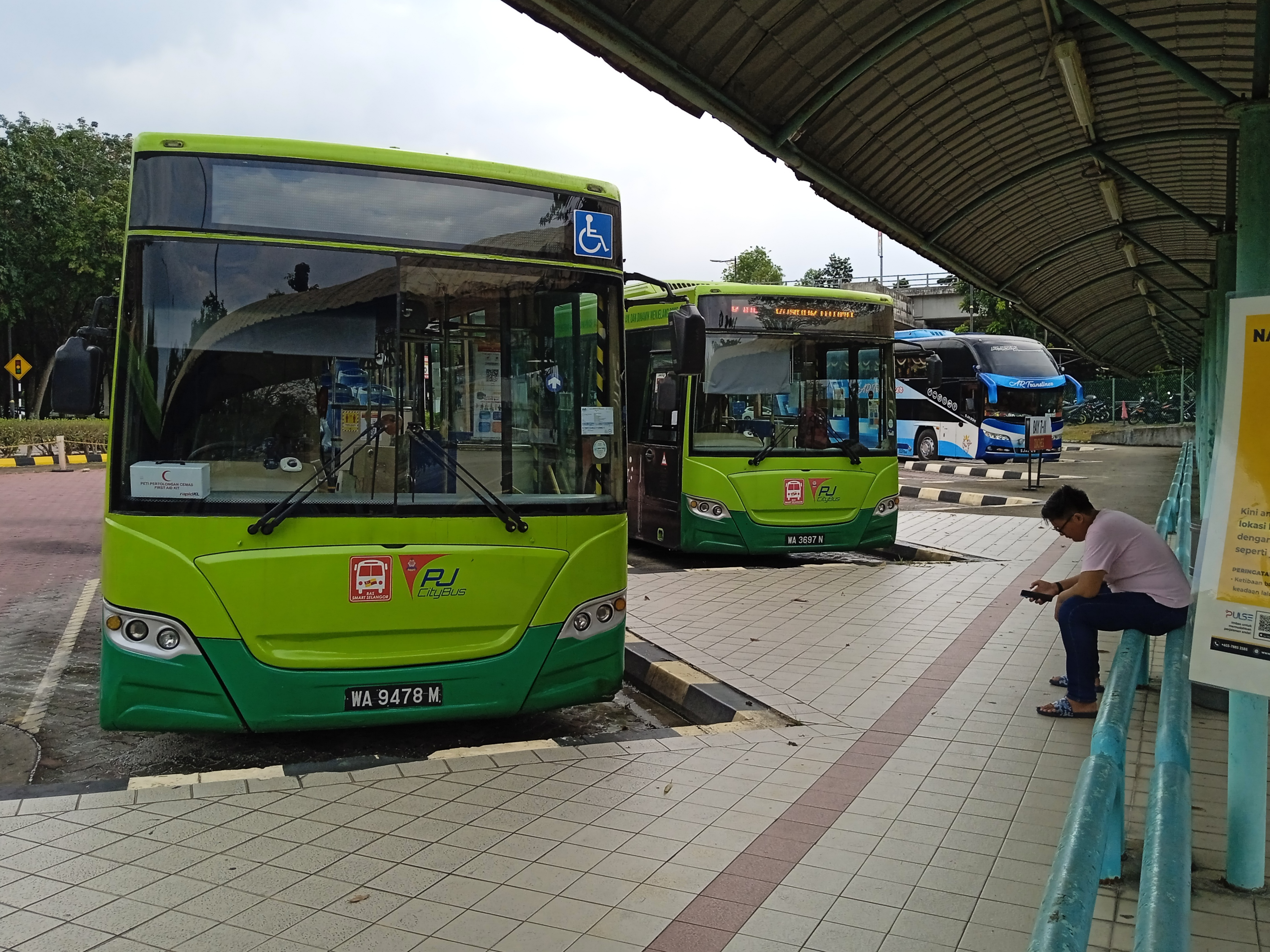
Bandar Utama bus hub

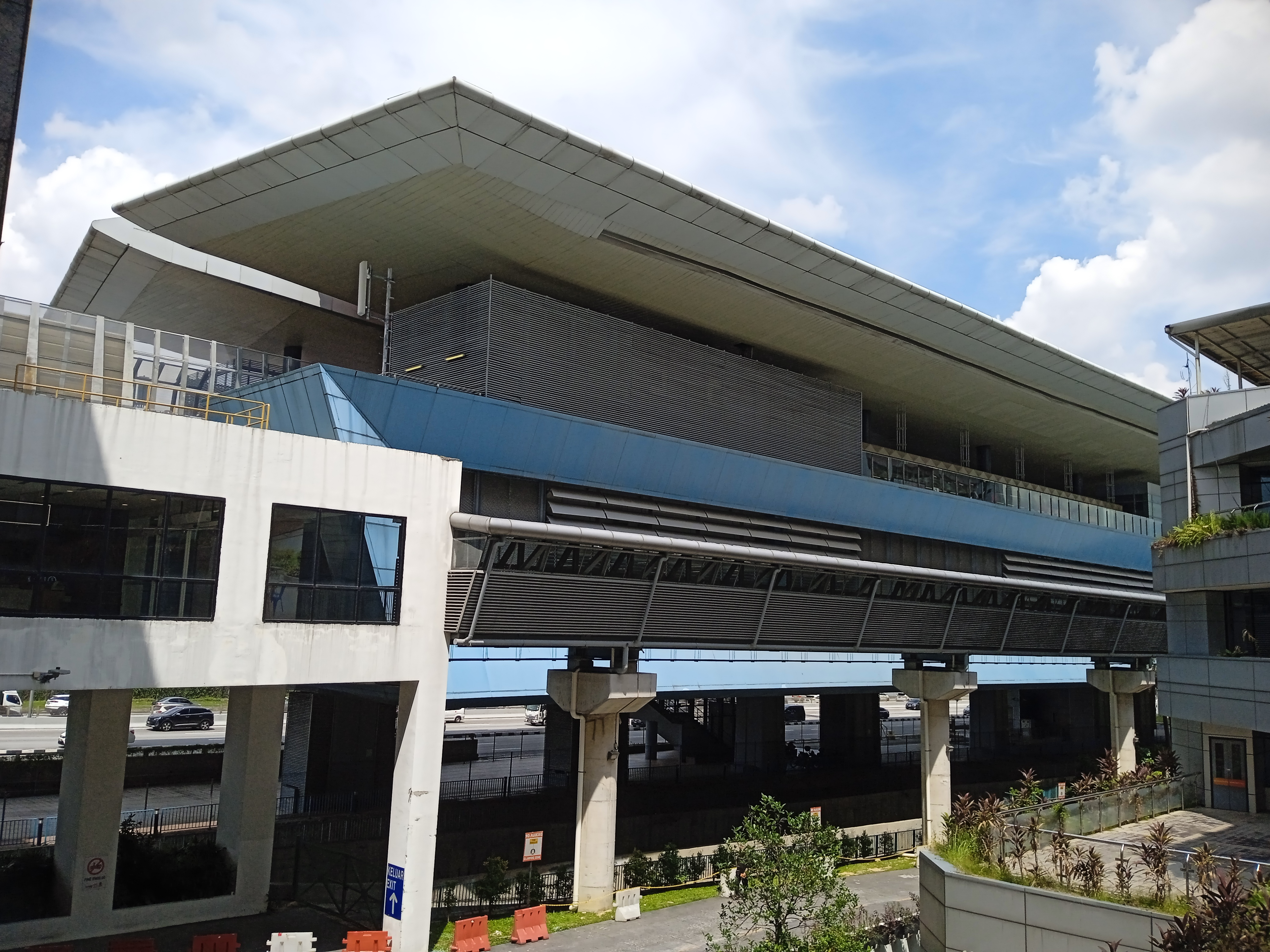
The Bandar Utama MRT station, connected to the mall via Entrance B

The mall is connected to several major roads including Damansara–Puchong Expressway at the Bandar Utama Interchange, and Lebuh Bandar Utama. In addition to providing 14,000 parking bays for cars, the mall also provides bicycle parking. The car park is also equipped with electric vehicle charging points.

The mall is also accessible via public transport via the Bandar Utama station that is served by the MRT Kajang Line and LRT Shah Alam Line. or via buses from Rapid KL and PJ City Bus bus services at the Bandar Utama bus hub.

== Incidents ==
=== Fires ===
There were two fires that broke out in the mall. The first fire was on February 25, 2013, which started in a storage facility in the children's playground equipment store which caused the whole building to experience a power outage. The second fire occurred on July 11, 2014, when the fire broke out from the kitchen of one of the food court. Both fires were minor, and no casualties were reported.

=== Crime ===
In response to the abduction of Canny Ong in a shopping center in Bangsar which led to her death on June 13, 2003, many shopping malls in Klang Valley strengthened their security in order to protect their customers, including One Utama shopping mall where the management deployed additional policemen, guard dogs and security guards to patrol the mall. Despite this, there were several false alarms when some customers reported to police that their cars were stolen, when in fact the customers forgot where they had parked their cars. During Chinese New Year in 2014, a burglar stole jewellery worth RM10 million in one of the jewellery shops. The heist was planned by a Latin American gang in advance before executing the burglary, which included hiding inside the mall as it closed, cutting off electricity, disabling the burglar alarm system, stealing CCTV recording units and melting safe doors using an oxy acetylene torch.

=== Suicide ===
A woman fell to her death from the 4th floor at the new wing on 19 May 2021. The incident happened at 1 pm. The mall emergency response team quickly handled the situation before handing it over to the police. The management of One Utama has confirmed that the police will be investigating the matter further.
