= SS2, Petaling Jaya =

SS2
- Inner Suburb
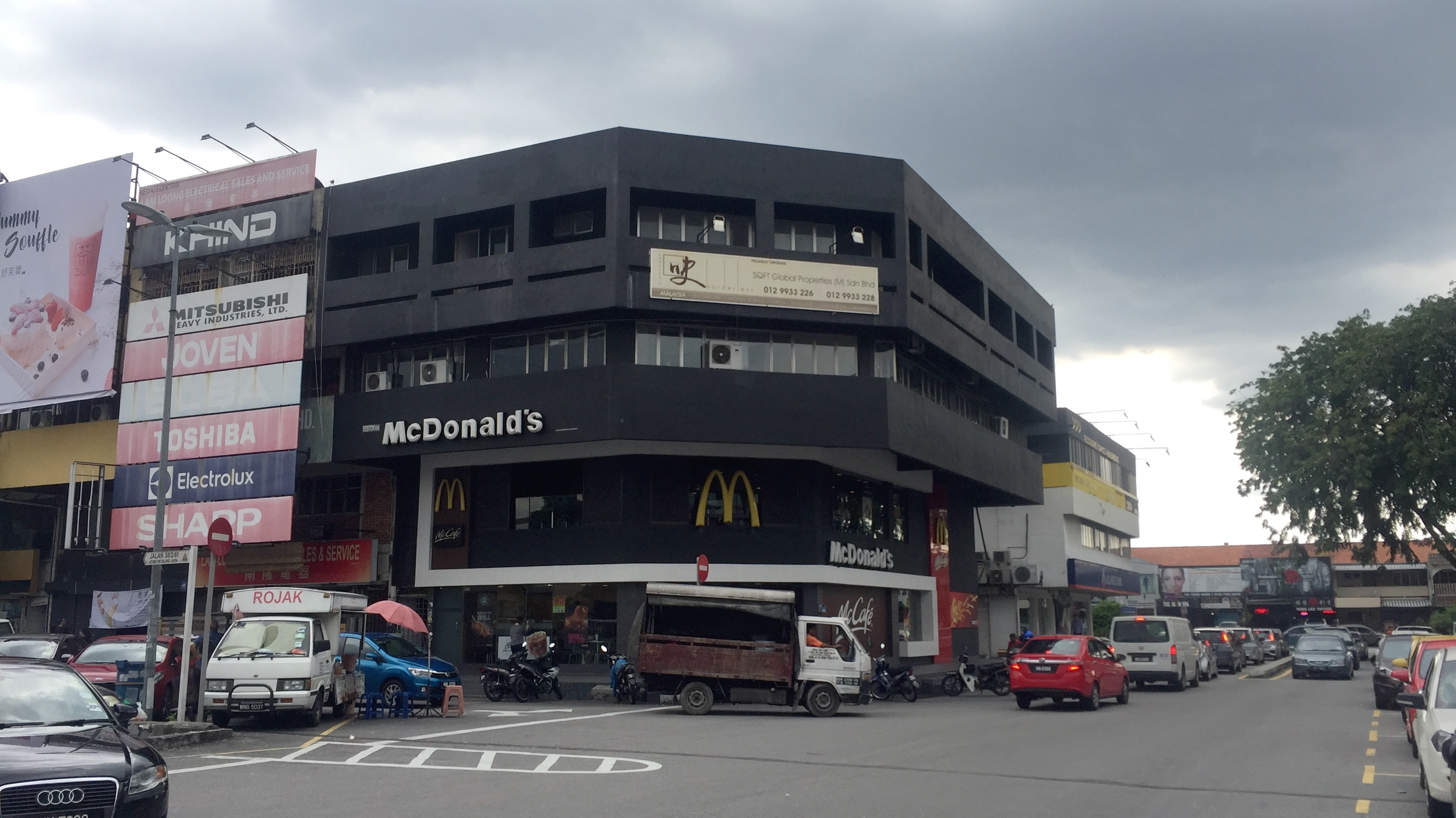
- A busy corner in one of SS2's commercial zones, with a corner McDonald's shophouse outlet next to traffic.
- Nickname: SS 2 (is an inner suburb in Petaling Jaya and not to be confused with Sungei Way)
- SS2 shown within Malaysia SS2 (Selangor)
- Coordinates: 3°07′05″N 101°37′15″E
- Country: Malaysia
- State: Selangor
- City: Petaling Jaya
- Federal seat: Damansara
- State seat: Kampung Tunku

Government
  - Local Authority: Petaling Jaya City Council
  - Mayor: Mohamad Azhan Md Amir
  - Member of Parliament: Gobind Singh Deo
  - State Assembly Representative: Lim Yi Wei
  - Councilor: Loh Y Lun
- Time zone: UTC+8 (MST)
- Postcode: 47300
- Dialling code: +60 378
- Police: Sea Park Police Station, Jalan SS 2/60
- Fire: Damansara Utama, Jalan SS 2/2

SS2, Petaling Jaya is an inner suburb in Petaling Jaya, one of the biggest cities in Malaysia's most developed state of Selangor. It is located 4 km northwest of Petaling Jaya's central business district of Seksyen 52 (also known as Petaling Jaya New Town). Its local government is the Petaling Jaya City Council (MBPJ).

== Location ==
First developed in the 1970s by property developer S.E.A Housing Corp Sdn Bhd, the inner suburb of SS2 today is a large housing area that boasts thousands of terraced, semi-detached and bungalow houses, the condominium complexes of Ameera Residences, Five Stones and the Jasmine Tower, along with a few commercial shoplot areas nested inside the district.

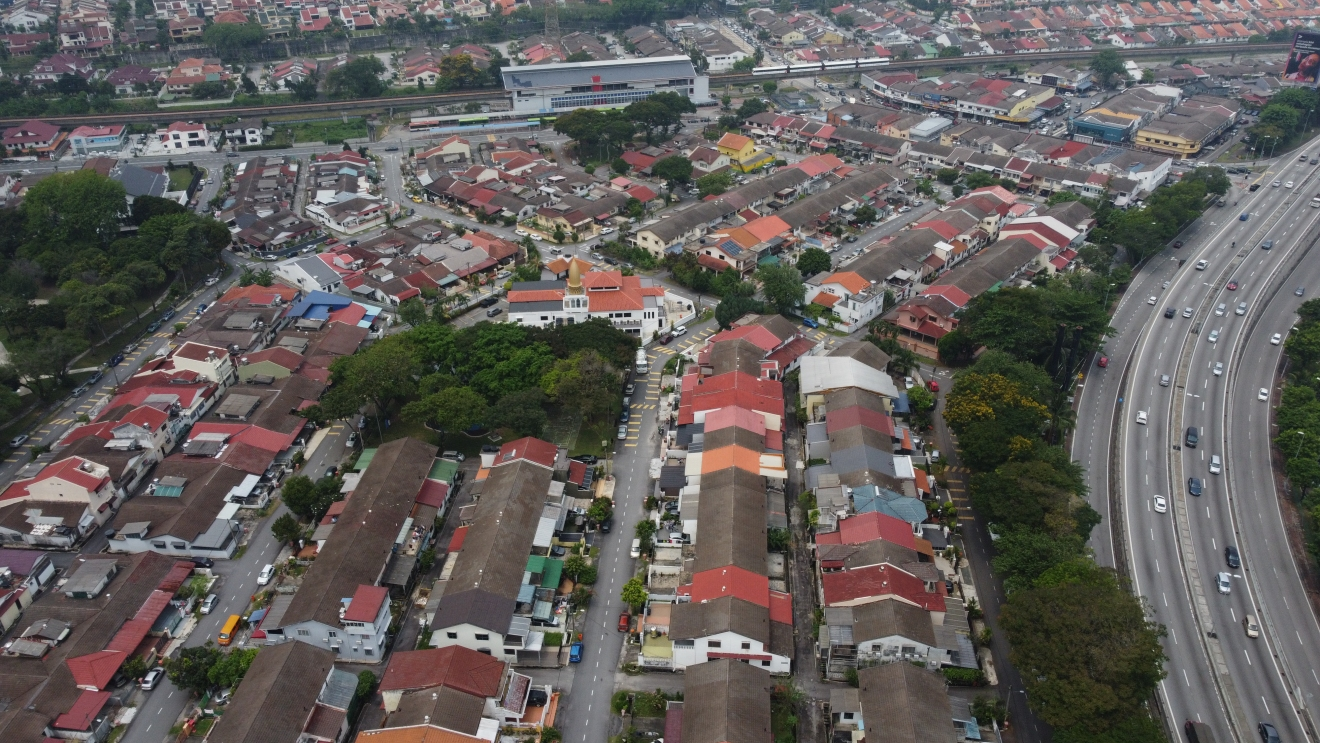
An aerial view of SS2's residential area in Petaling Jaya, Selangor, Malaysia

The SS in the neighborhood's name stands for Sungai Way-Subang. Addresses in PJ are standardized. The town is divided into numbered sections (seksyen), which are denoted with just S (eastern PJ), SS (central and western PJ), PJU (northern PJ), and PJS (southern PJ). The northern chunk is also known as Damansara.

SS2 is located south of the Damansara–Puchong Expressway Damansara–Puchong Expressway, separating it from the SS22 and SS23 neighborhoods to the west. The Section 21, SS3 and SS4 housing areas are to the south, while the Section 19 neighborhood is to the east.

== Education ==
Two primary schools operate in SS2. SK Taman Sea, a national school, is located on Jalan SS2/95. SJK (C) Puay Chai, a Chinese-language school, is on Jalan SS2/54. The SMK Taman SEA secondary school is on Jalan SS2/3, a minute's walk away from the Taman Bahagia LRT Station.

== Politics ==
The current Member of Parliament is Damansara (Selangor federal constituency)'s Gobind Singh Deo from the Democratic Action Party (DAP). SS2 is also served by Kampung Tunku state assembly-woman Lim Yi Wei, from the DAP. SS2's Councilor is Wong Swee Sang, also from the DAP.

== Religion ==
The Masjid Aminah Al-Muhairi mosque is located on the southern end of SS2, on Jalan SS2/6. Launched in 1980, it can house 800 worshipers. Two suraus are under its jurisdiction: the Surau Kg. Cempaka and Surau Balai Bomba. The Community Baptist Church (PJ), a Protestant church, is on Jalan SS2/6, 500m away from the mosque. A second Protestant church, the SS Gospel Center is located on Jalan SS2/103.

The Malaysian Myanmar Buddhist Association is located on Jalan SS2/72, and a Chinese temple known as 關聖堂 is also located on Jalan SS2/72.

== Economy ==
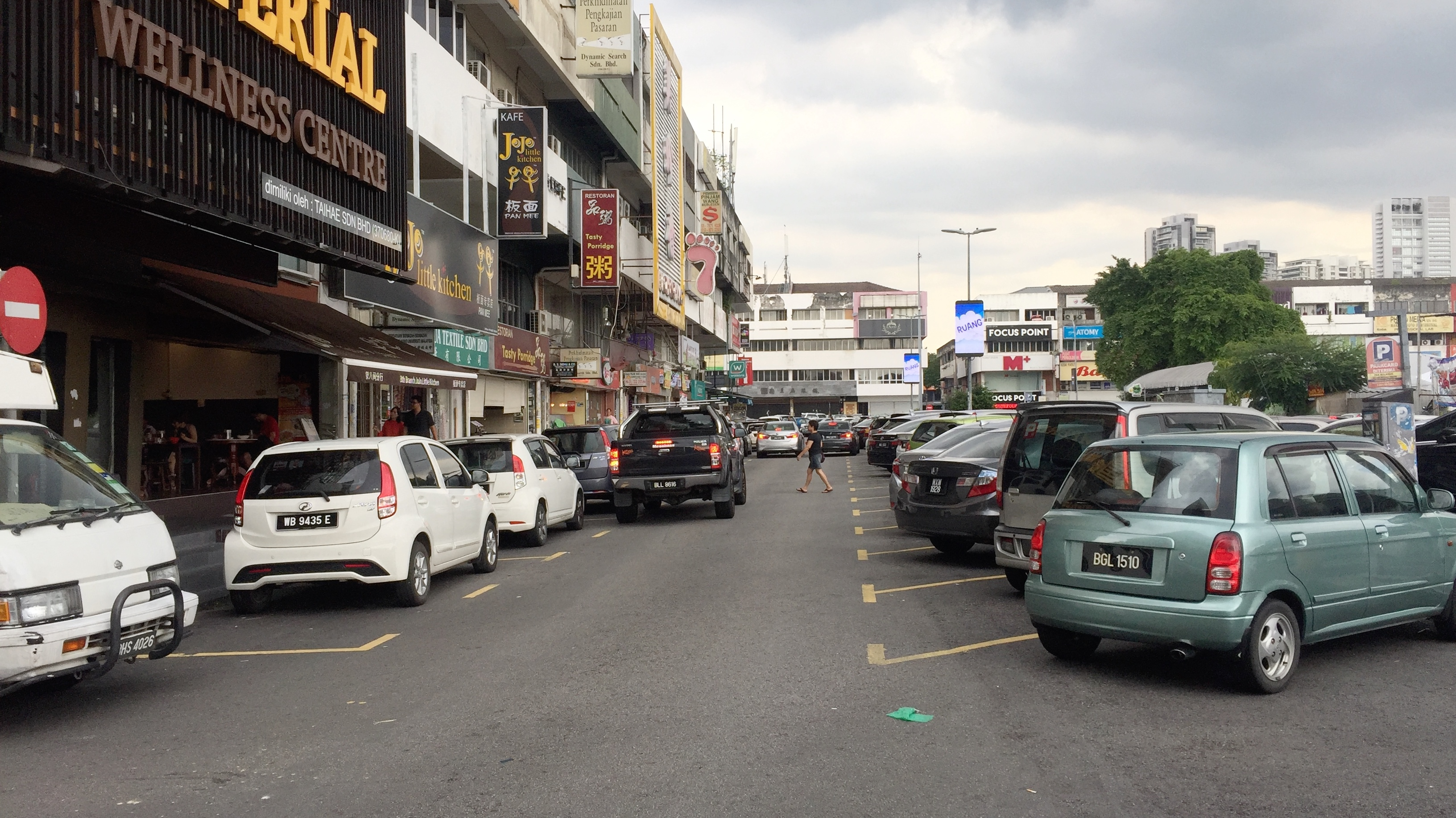
A street level view of one of the streets in the largest commercial zone in SS2, with shophouses on the left and parked cars on the right.

There are six unnamed commercial zones in SS2, with office and business shophouses lining their respective streets, with most connected directly to the main roads criss-crossing this inner city suburb.

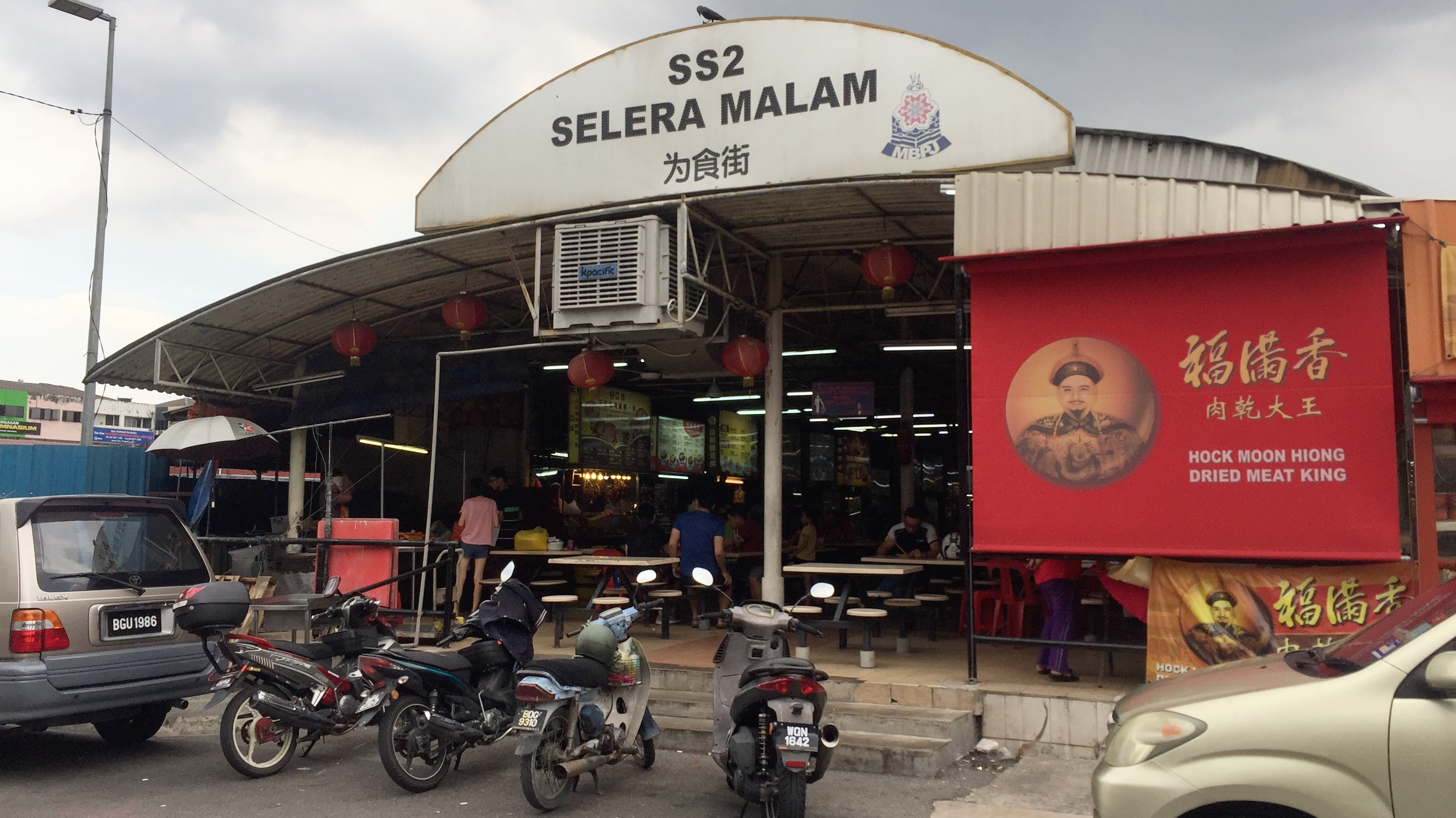
The SS2 hawker centre, located in the middle of the SS2 commercial zone, seating hundreds of people and dozens of food stalls.

The busiest of the six is the one next to the Jalan SS 2/55 street: a large "business district" area with over 20 separated blocks of shophouses. It is home to several banks, a 24-hour McDonalds outlet, the local police station, three Petron petrol stations, the daily morning market (that runs from 6am to 10am every day), a weekly Monday night market and two night-time hawker centres next to a small park.

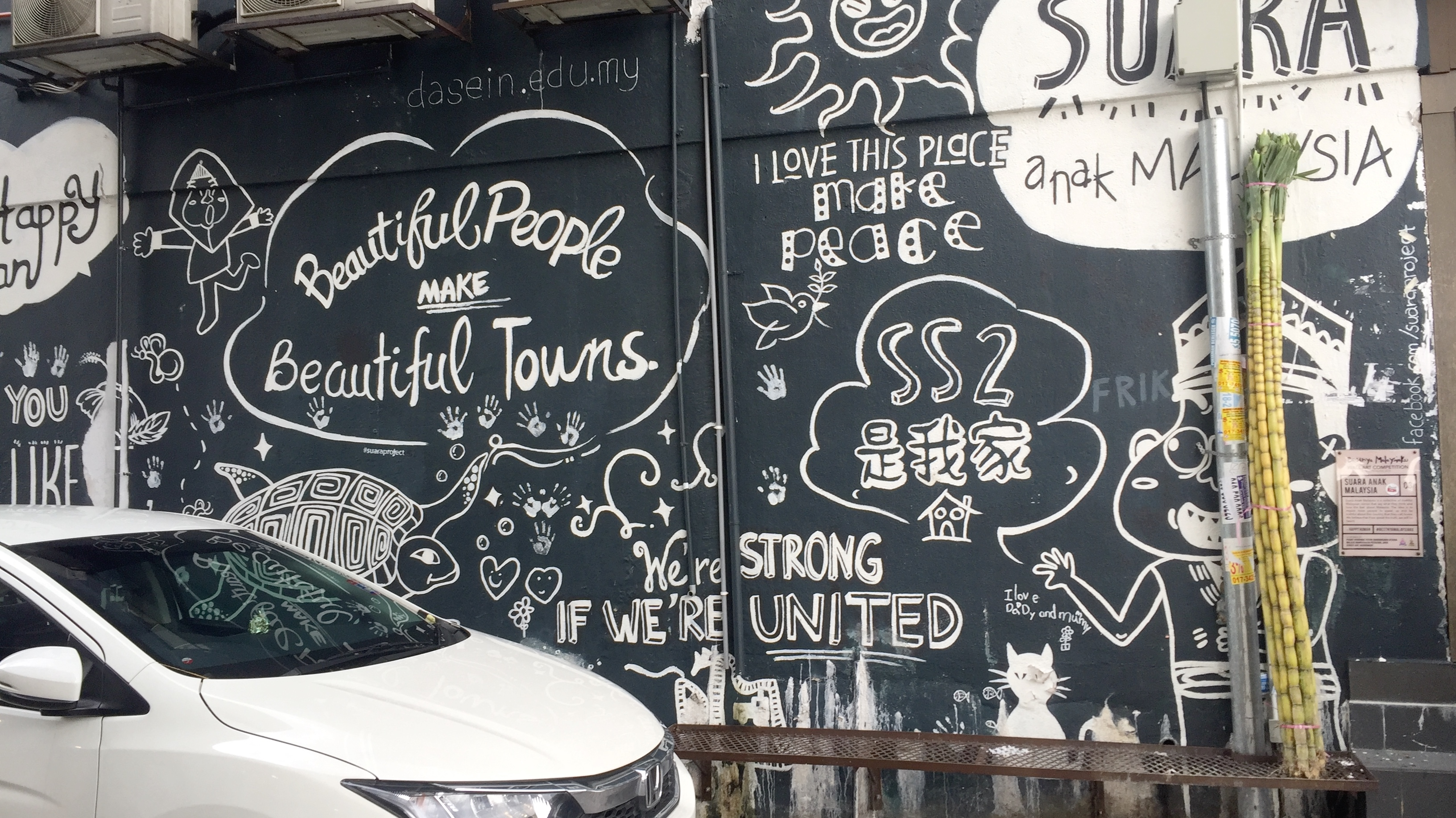
A mural-filled alleyway with Malaysian culture and themes, nested between one of the shophouses blocks in the SS2 commercial zone.

Several durian-selling businesses have set up shop in the zone's central area where customers can buy and eat the fruits on the spot. A number of businesses have also set up in the double-storey houses surrounding this area, with many populated by bridal boutiques.

This zone is home to a community composting centre called the Smart PJ Waste Solution Lab, located along Jalan SS2/63 and said to the first of its kind in the country. Its composters are able to handle two tons of food waste each day, with waste collected from the food court and market converted into compost and enzymes. A Buddhist organisation also organises a regular recycling collection programme in near the local police station, operating on the morning of every 3rd Sunday of the month.

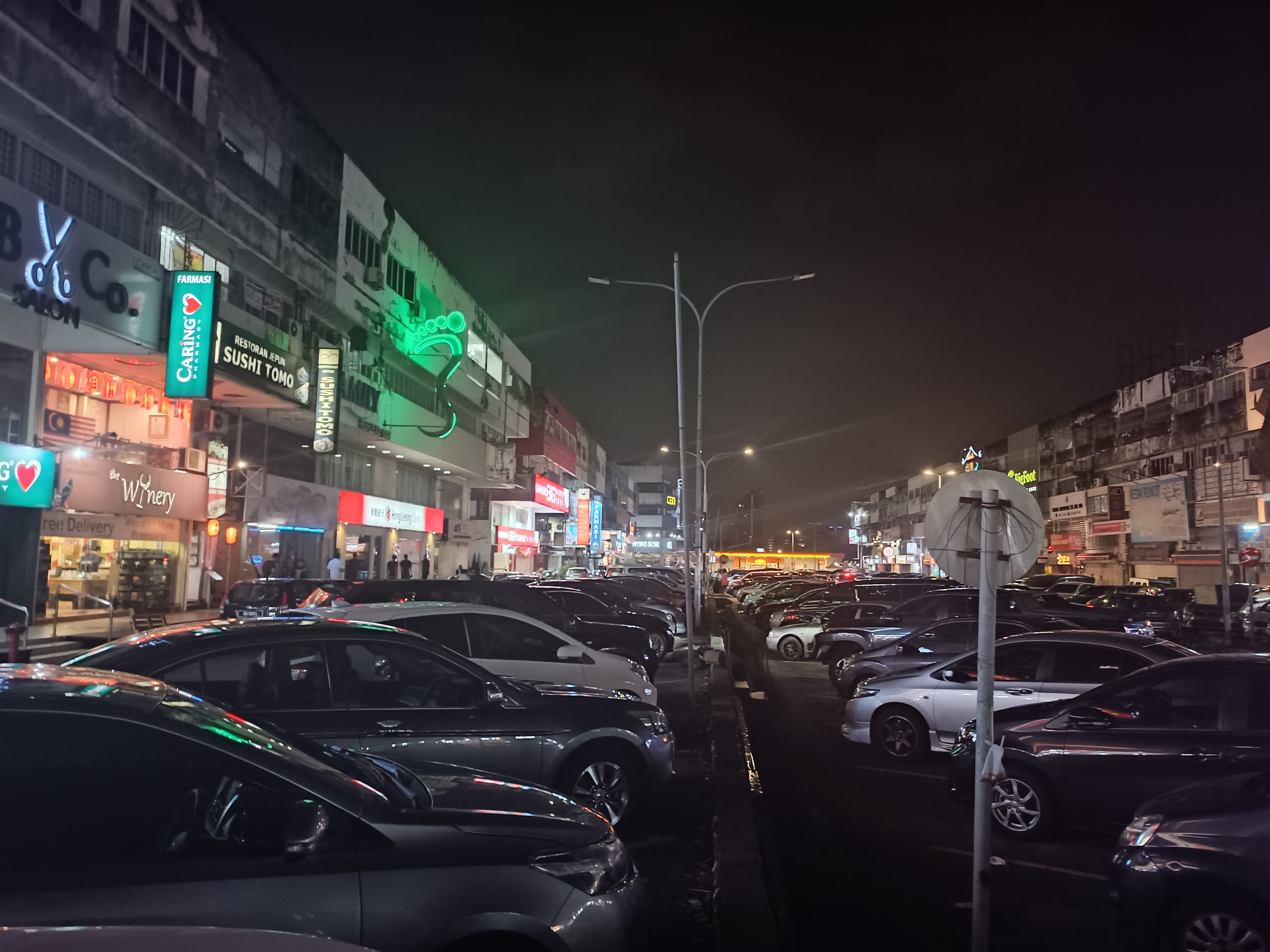
The SS2/67 street at night

The other five commercial areas are located along the Jalan SS2/3, Jalan SS2/6 (which has a weekly Thursday night market), Jalan SS2/24, Jalan SS2/72 and Jalan SS2/103 streets with their own respective offices, shops and restaurants.

The area also once hosted the SStwo shopping mall, though it was permanently closed down in March 2015 after operating for less than five years due to poor performance. DK Group of Companies, the mall's owner, later said it was planning to going to turn the site into a healthcare centre.

== Public Parks ==
SS2 is home to a number of public playgrounds and parks of varying sizes. Most of these are contained within the inner suburb's residential areas, though one is located in the district's main commercial area, which boasts a roofed outdoor basketball court and a public toilet.

== Transport ==
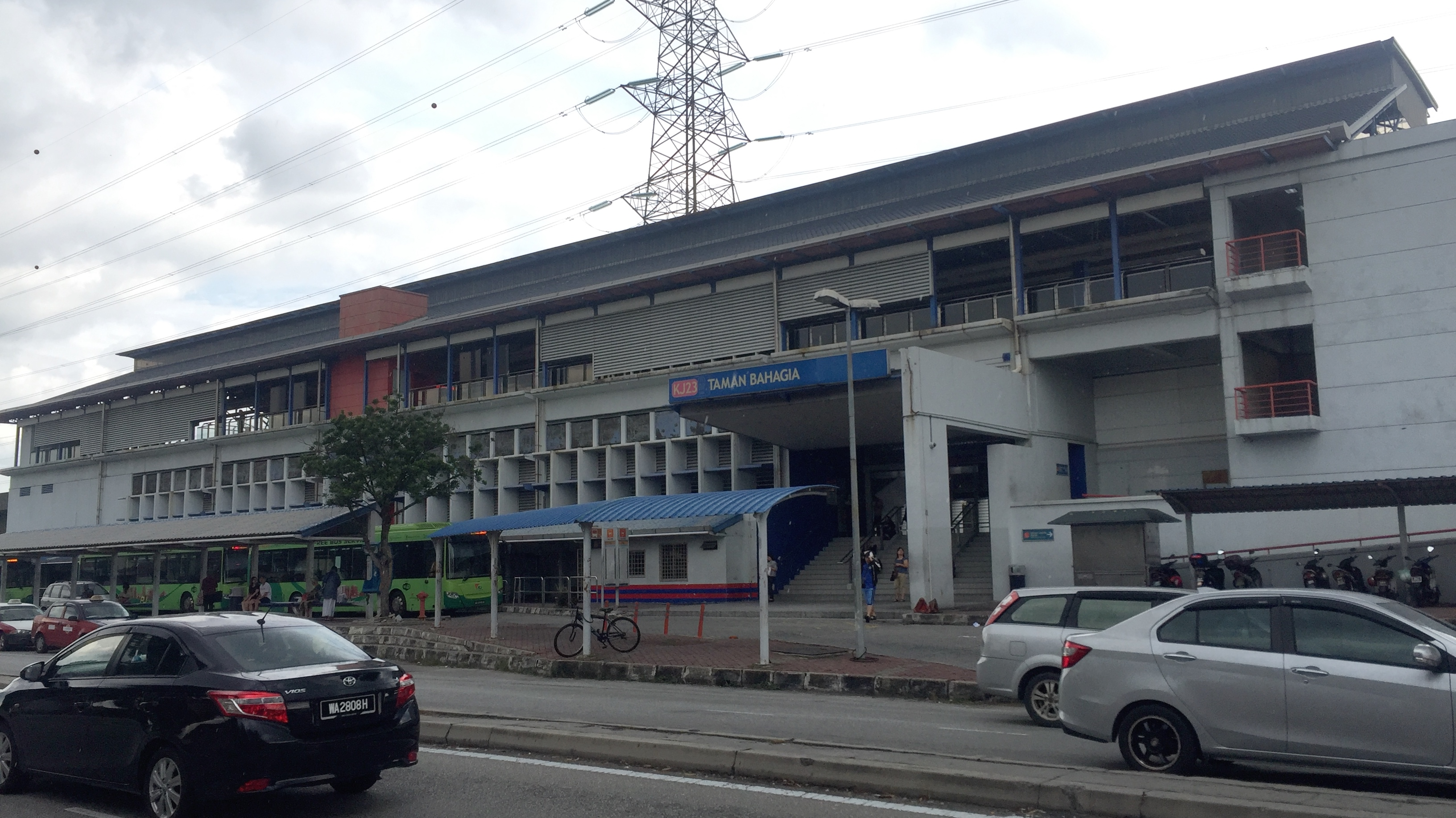
The Taman Bahagia LRT (Light Rail Transit) station in SS2, Petaling Jaya, Malaysia, one of the many passenger stations on the Kelana Jaya LRT line.

Roads in SS2 are some of the most heavily used in the city, with the district bordering the Damansara–Puchong Expressway which acts a link to Subang Jaya and Puchong to the west and Kuala Lumpur to the east.

A number of roads coming from adjacent sections such as SS1, SS4, Section 19 and Section 21 also lead Kuala Lumpur or Subang Jaya-bound motorists to the district on their way to the Damansara–Puchong Expressway.

The district is also home to the Taman Bahagia LRT Station, which sees thousands of Kelana Jaya Line commuters boarding the station along Jalan SS 2/3 every day.

Rapid KL buses linking this station to residential areas in and around Petaling Jaya pass through the area, along with other bus lines such as the free-to-use Petaling Jaya City Bus and MRT Sungai Buloh-Kajang Line feeder buses from the Phileo Damansara MRT station make SS2 a popular and well-travelled transit location.

| Route No. | Origin | Desitination | Via | Remarks |
|---|---|---|---|---|
| 780 | Flat Seksyen 8, Kota Damansara | KJ14 SBK16 Pasar Seni station | Poh Kong, Jalan SS 2/55; SPG Jalan 21/13, Jalan SS 2/35 | |
| T783 | KJ23 Taman Bahagia LRT | KJ23 Taman Bahagia LRT | Sea Park Secondary School, Jalan SS 2/3 | |
| T784 | KJ23 Taman Bahagia LRT | KJ23 Taman Bahagia LRT | Poh Kong, Jalan SS 2/55; Poh Kong, Jalan SS 2/55; Petron, Jalan SS 2/24; Sea Park Secondary School, Jalan SS 2/3 | |
| T790 | KJ22 Taman Paramount LRT | KJ22 Taman Paramount LRT | Poh Kong, Jalan SS 2/55 | Links with KL Gateway–Universiti LRT station and Mid Valley Megamall |
| T816 | SBK12 Phileo Damansara MRT station Entrance A | SBK12 Phileo Damansara MRT station Entrance A | SS2 Fire Station, Jalan SS 2/2; Poh Kong, Jalan SS 2/55; Jejantas SS 2/24 | |
| PJ02 | KJ22 Taman Jaya LRT | KJ22 Taman Jaya LRT | Perodua showroom, Jalan SS 2/24; Public Bank, Jalan SS 2/75; Poh Kong, Jalan SS 2/55; Sea Park Police Station, Jalan SS 2/24 | |
| PJ03 | KJ23 Taman Bahagia LRT | KJ23 Taman Bahagia LRT | Sea Park Secondary School, Jalan SS 2/3 | |
| PJ04 | KJ23 Taman Bahagia LRT | KJ23 Taman Bahagia LRT | Petron, Jalan SS 2/24; Sea Park Police Station, Jalan SS 2/24; Vision Space, Jalan SS 2/75; Public Bank, Jalan SS 2/75; Poh Kong, Jalan SS 2/55; Auto Film, Jalan SS 2/24; Petron Seapark, Jalan SS 2/24; Sea Park Secondary School, Jalan SS 2/3 | |
| PJ05 | Bandar Utama bus hub | Bandar Utama bus hub | Sea Park Secondary School, Jalan SS 2/3; KJ23 Taman Bahagia LRT | |

== Resident's Associations ==
- SS2 Selatan Resident's Association
- SS2 Utara Resident's Association
- SS2B Resident's Association
