= Wild banana =

Wild banana may refer to:

- Musa acuminata, wild ancestor of the domestic banana plants
- Musa balbisiana, the domestic banana and true plantain plants

== See also ==
- Wild type
