= Taman Bahagia LRT station =

Metro station in Selangor, Malaysia

Coordinates: 3°06′38″N 101°36′45″E

KJ23 Taman Bahagia

General information
- Other names: Malay: تامن بهاݢيا (Jawi); Chinese: 幸福花园; Tamil: தாமான் பகாகியா
- Location: Jalan SS 2/3, SS2; 47300 Petaling Jaya; Selangor; Malaysia
- System: Rapid KL
- Owner: Prasarana Malaysia
- Operator: Rapid Rail
- Line: 5 Kelana Jaya Line
- Platforms: 2 side platforms
- Tracks: 2
- Connections: Rapid KL Bus, PJ Free Bus, Taxi

Construction
- Structure type: Elevated
- Parking: Available with payment, under MBPJ
- Cycle facilities: Available; 20 parking racks. Bike N' Ride available only in 4 coach trains
- Accessible: Available

Other information
- Station code: KJ23

History
- Opened: 1 September 1998; 27 years ago

Services
Preceding station		Following station
Taman Paramount towards Gombak	Kelana Jaya Line	Kelana Jaya towards Putra Heights
Location

Taman Bahagia LRT station is a 2-storey light rapid transit (LRT) train station in the SS2 neighbourhood of Petaling Jaya, Selangor, Malaysia. It is served by Rapid KL's LRT Kelana Jaya Line. The station was constructed between 1995 and 1998 on a piece of land that was previously occupied by the Taman Gelora housing estate, a row of 25 single-storey terraced houses. The owners and residences started to move out of their homes in June 1995. The adjacent Taman Gelora 11 kV Tenaga Nasional substation, named after the former housing estate, is the sole indication of the previous existence of these homes.

Platform level

This station serves the neighbourhoods of SS2, SS3, and SS23 of Petaling Jaya. Buses from this station also extend the reach of this station to the neighbourhoods of SS4, SS5 and SS6 (which collectively form Kelana Jaya, Damansara Jaya (SS22) & Damansara Utama (SS21).

The station is located along Jalan SS 2/3, near the Taman Megah interchange of the Damansara–Puchong Expressway (LDP).

A free parking lot is available behind the station.
