= Kelana Jaya LRT station =

Railway station in Malaysia

Coordinates: 3°06′45″N 101°36′14″E

KJ24 Kelana Jaya
- View Kelana Jaya station from the northbound carriegeway of the Damansara–Puchong Expressway

General information
- Other names: Malay: کلان جاي (Jawi); Chinese: 格拉那再也; Tamil: கிளானா ஜெயா
- Location: Southbound carriageway of the Damansara-Puchong Expressway between Exit 1108 and 1109, Kelana Jaya, SS4, 47301 Petaling Jaya; Selangor; Malaysia
- System: Rapid KL
- Owner: Prasarana Malaysia
- Operator: Rapid Rail
- Line: 5 Kelana Jaya Line
- Platforms: 1 island platforms
- Tracks: 2
- Connections: Rapid KL Bus, PJ Free Bus, Taxi

Construction
- Structure type: Elevated
- Parking: Available with payment. 482 parking bays.
- Cycle facilities: Available; 20 bicycles rack. Bike N' Ride available only for 4 coach trains
- Accessible: Available

Other information
- Station code: KJ24

History
- Opened: 1 September 1998; 27 years ago

Services
Preceding station		Following station
Taman Bahagia towards Gombak	Kelana Jaya Line	Lembah Subang towards Putra Heights
Location

Kelana Jaya LRT station is a light rapid transit (LRT) station on the LRT Kelana Jaya Line. It was the former western terminus for passenger services on the line, and hence, is the namesake of the LRT line. It is the start of Rapid KL's LRT Extension Project which extended the current terminus to Putra Heights.

The station is located beside the southbound carriageway of the Damansara–Puchong Expressway (LDP) between exits 1108 and 1109 in the SS4 neighbourhood of Petaling Jaya, which forms part of the suburb of Kelana Jaya, and is connected to an overhead crossing bridge for pedestrians to cross the highway to Taman Mayang (SS25).

Located nearby are the neighbourhoods of SS2, Kelana Jaya (SS4 and SS5), Taman Mayang (SS25) and Taman Megah (SS24). As the station is on a major expressway, it is well served by bus connections that take passengers to the areas of Petaling Jaya Utara (PJU or Northern Petaling Jaya), Tropicana, Subang Jaya, Bandar Sunway and Putrajaya. It is also a local taxi hub.

== Location and station layout ==
L2	Transfer Linkway	Sky Bridge (to Shuttle Bus Station, Taxi Station, SS25), Shops
L2	Platform 1:	5 Kelana Jaya Line towards KJ1 Gombak (→)
L2	Island platform, doors will open on the right
L2	Platform 2:	5 Kelana Jaya Line towards KJ37 Putra Heights (←)
L1	Concourse	Faregates, Ticketing Machines, Station Control, Shops, Pedestrian Bridge to Taman Mayang (SS25)
G	Street Level	Bus Terminal, Taxi Terminal, Shops

Kelana Jaya station consists of an island platform, with a concourse below. The car park (Park 'N Ride) and bus stand sit below the concourse and station building.

The pedestrian bridge, Spanning over the Damansara–Puchong Expressway, it leads to the second exit onto the SS 25/2 road.

The primary exit of the station serves SS4 and SS5 in the northern part of Kelana Jaya, as well as SS2. The overhead pedestrian bridge, spanning over the LDP, leads to a secondary exit on Jalan SS 25/2 in Taman Mayang (SS25).

A pedestrian walkway with flights of stairs connects the station with Jalan SS 4C/15. The secondary exit caters to the Taman Megah (SS24) and Taman Mayang (SS25) neighbourhoods of Petaling Jaya. Nearby landmarks include Mayang Oasis, SK Taman Megah, and SJK(C) Yuk Chai.

== Architecture ==
The station is built in a similar design to most of the other older above-ground stations on the Kelana Jaya Line (prior to the extension to Putra Heights). The large roof over the platform level is reminiscent of traditional Malay kampung architectural design.

== Bus services ==
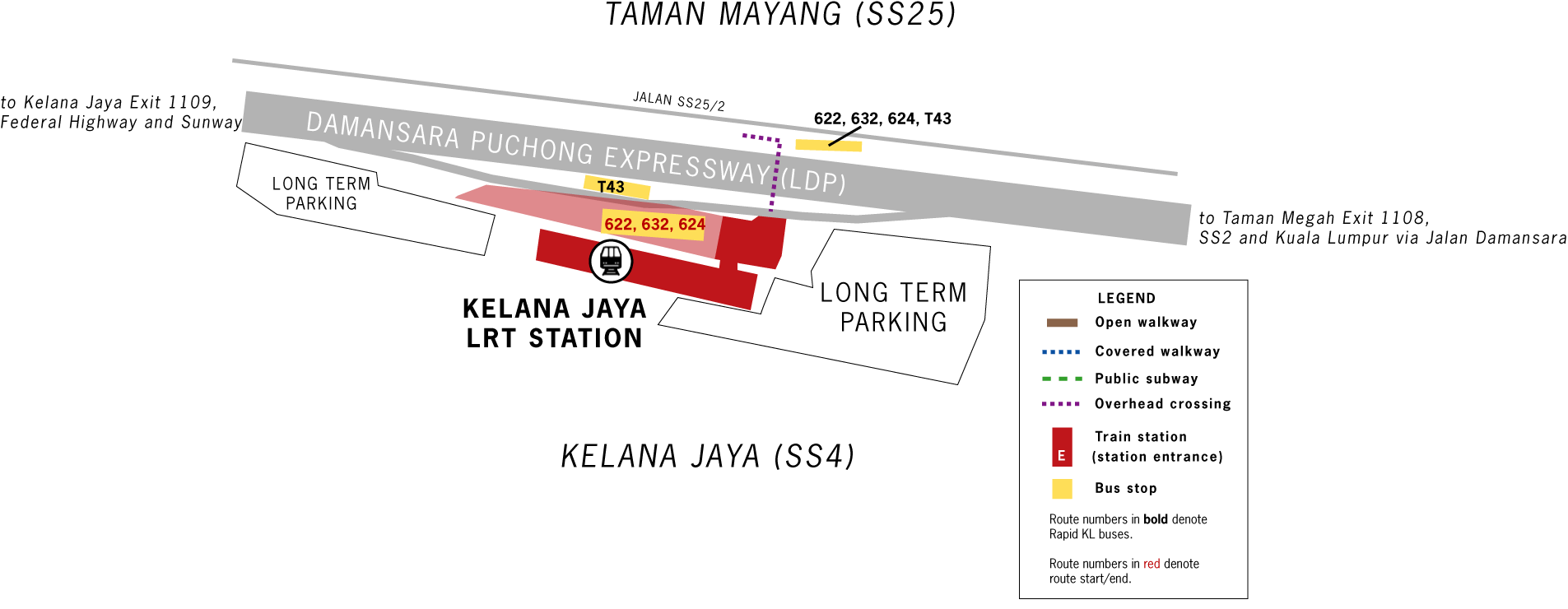

Kelana Jaya LRT Station bus hub

Kelana Jaya station is also a Rapid KL bus hub for the surrounding areas of Petaling Jaya. To serve this purpose, there is a major bus stop located opposite the expressway on the northbound carriageway, linked to the station by the overhead pedestrian bridge. Buses depart from the station on the southbound carriageway, but many buses drop their passengers at the bus stop to avoids congestion in the station bus terminal. This station also offer a bus route to Bandar Utama MRT station.

== Bus Services ==
=== Feeder buses ===
Route No.	Origin	Desitination	Via	Connecting to
T780	SA03 BU 11	Taman Mayang Emas / Muitiara Tropicana; KJ24 Kelana Jaya	Persiaran Tropicana; Jalan Bukit Mayang Emas; SA05 Damansara Idaman; Jalan SS 25/23; Damansara–Puchong Expressway	T807
T781	KJ24 Kelana Jaya	Kelana Centre Point / Stadium MBPJ; SA06 Subang	Damansara–Puchong Expressway; Jalan SS 7/26; Jalan SS 7/19; KJ27 SA07 Glenmarie; Jalan SS 7/2; Jalan SS 7/15; Jalan SS 7/13	

=== Other buses ===
Route No.	Origin	Desitination	Via	Connecting to
506 (Closed)	Central Park Avenue (Bandar Utama bus hub)	KT3 PY41 Putrajaya Sentral	KG09 SA01 Bandar Utama; Damansara Utama; KJ24 Kelana Jaya; Kelana Jaya; SP24 IOI Puchong Jaya/IOI Mall Puchong; SP25 Pusat Bandar Puchong; Damansara–Puchong Expressway; Puchong Utama; FT 29 Putrajaya-Cyberjaya Expressway	(Alternative bus lines) 503, 523, T508, T509, T510, T511, T512, L02, L03, L04, L05, L15, BET13, BET15
783	KJ24 Kelana Jaya	Subang Parade	Damansara–Puchong Expressway; Jalan PJS 7/8; Jalan PJS 7/13; Sunway Pyramid; Kompleks Sukan 3C MPSJ; Persiaran Kewajipan; Jalan Kemajuan Subang	641, 708, 771, T770
802 (Closed)	KJ24 Kelana Jaya	Kota Damansara (Section 11, 5 & 4)	Damansara–Puchong Expressway; Damansara Jaya; Damansara Utama; Jalan SS 21/1; Persiaran Bandar Utama; Lebuh Bandar Utama; Central Park Avenue (Bandar Utama bus hub); Persiaran Surian; KG07 Surian; Persiaran Mahoghani; Jalan Kenyalang 11/1; Masjid Kota Damansara; Jalan Sepah Puteri 5/1; Persiaran Kenanga; Jalan Camar 4/1	(Alternative bus lines) 780, T805

== Gallery ==
Main entrance of the station

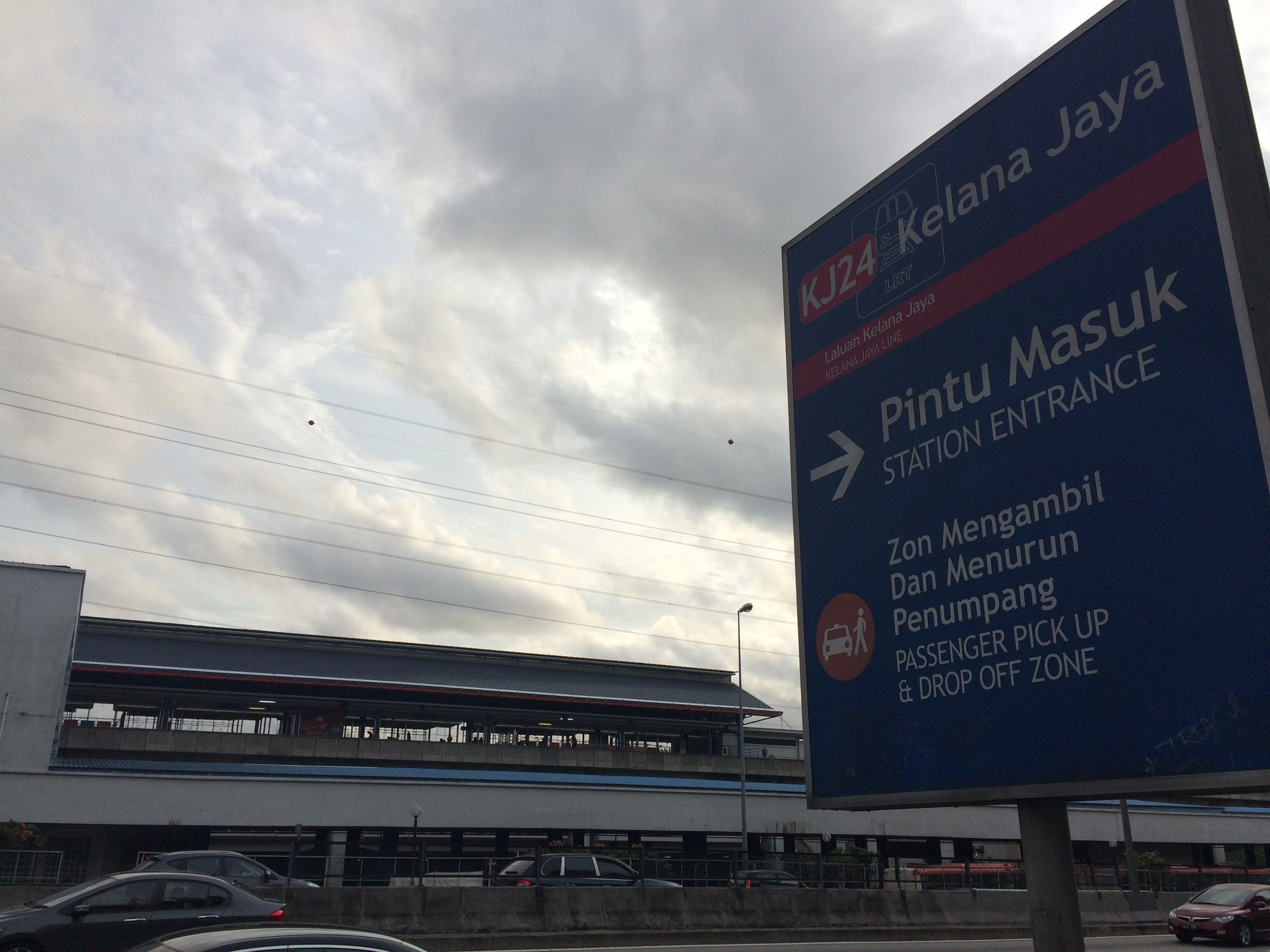
The signboard leading to the station, with the island platforms viewed from the exterior

The ground level Entrance A to the train station with a KK Super Mart store can be seen

The platform

The fare gates at the station

The station board

The island platform at the station

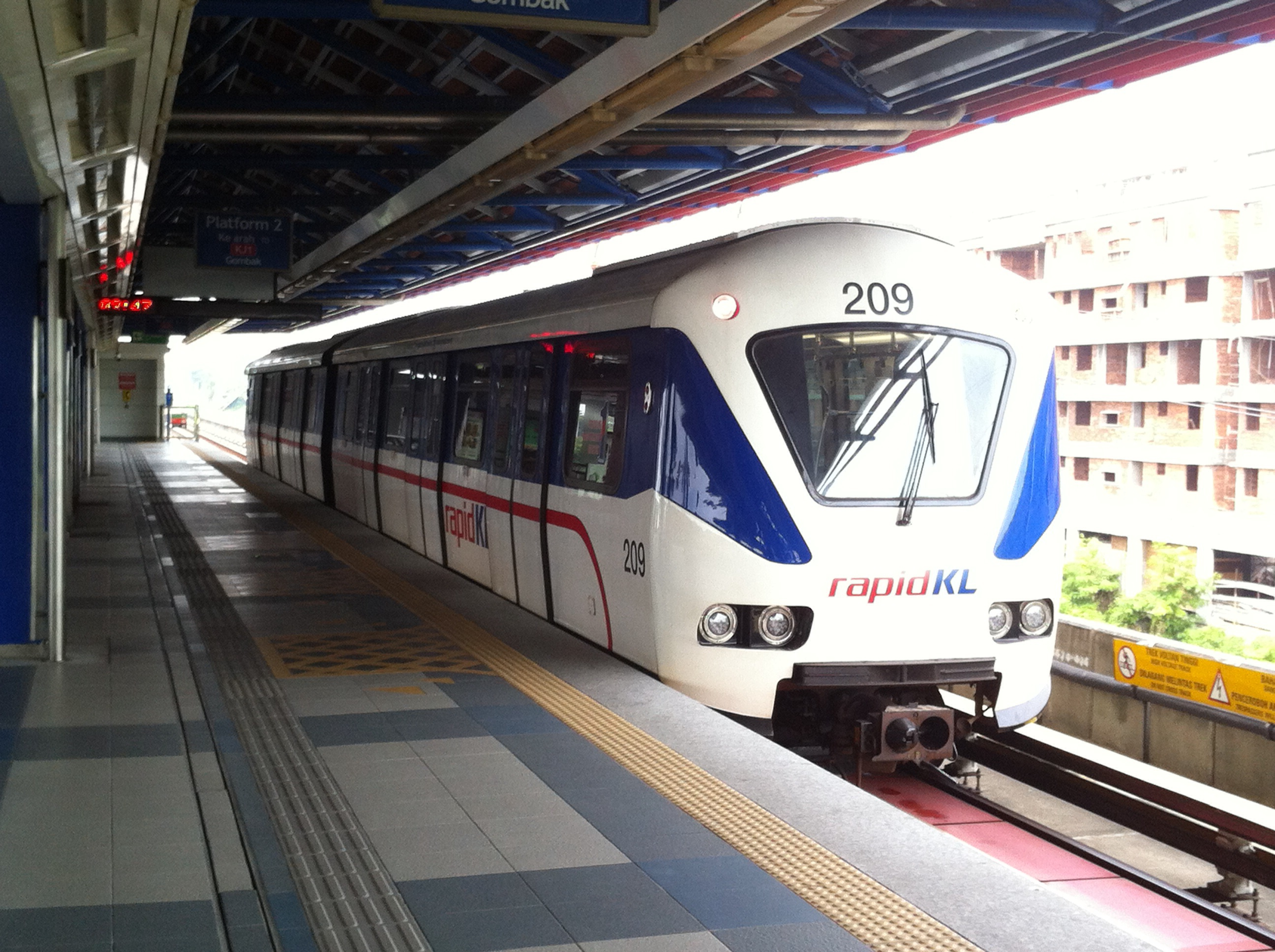
A two-car Innovia Metro 200 arriving at the station

== See also ==
- LRT Kelana Jaya Line
