= Bandar Utama bus hub =

Bus station in Petaling Jaya, Malaysia

Bandar Utama bus hub Hentian Bandar Utama Hab Bas Bandar Utama
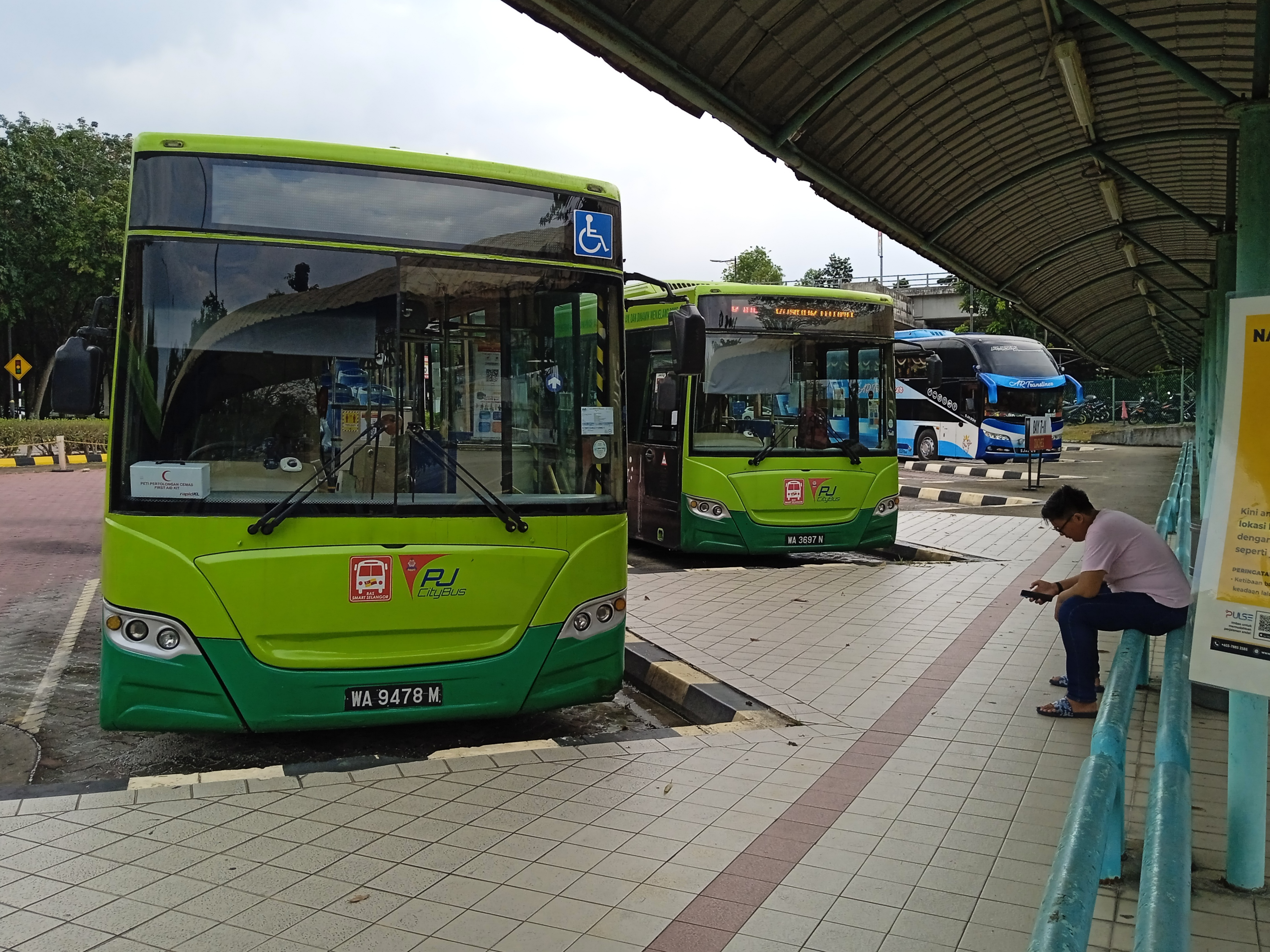

General information
- Location: Petaling Jaya, Selangor; Malaysia
- Coordinates: 3.1513°N 101.6132°E
- System: Intercharge bus hub
- Bus operators: Rapid Bus
- Connections: Bandar Utama MRT station
Location

Bandar Utama bus hub is a bus interchange located at Petaling Jaya, Selangor, Malaysia. It is located next to the New Wing of 1 Utama Shopping Centre at the Central Park Avenue. This bus hub is served primarily by Rapid Bus and PJ City Bus.

== Rapid KL Bus ==
Bandar Utama is the rapidKL bus hub for their bus route services.

- 506 : Bandar Utama - Putrajaya Sentral (Terminated)
- 801 : Bandar Utama - Metro Prima via Bandar Sri Damansara (Terminated)
- 802 : Kelana Jaya LRT - Kota Damansara via Bandar Utama (Section 6 Kota Damansara bound only) (Terminated)
- PJ05 : Bandar Utama - Taman Bahagia LRT station via Damansara Jaya (operated by PJ City Bus)
- PJ06 : Bandar Utama - Damansara Damai via Bandar Sri Damansara (operated by PJ City Bus)

The rapidKL routes radiating out from Bandar Utama bus hub with connecting City Shuttles and Express Buses.
Route	Origin	Via	Destination	Connecting To
506 (Terminated)	Bandar Utama	1 Utama Shopping Centre - Lebuh Bandar Utama - Damansara–Puchong Expressway (LDP) - Damansara Utama (Uptown) - Kolej Damansara Utama (KDU) - Simpang Jalan SS 2/55 - Sime Darby Specialist Centre Megah - Kelana Jaya LRT - SMK Kelana Jaya - Giant Hypermarket Kelana Jaya - Kelana Jaya Post Office - Plaza Perabot LDP - PJS 7 / PJS 9 Bandar Sunway - Petaling Jaya Selatan Toll Plaza - Kolej Putra - IOI Mall - IOI Business Park - TESCO Puchong - Simpang Bandar Puteri - Simpang Puchong Perdana - Simpang Kampung Baru Puchong - Puchong Selatan Toll Plaza - Jalan B15	Putrajaya Sentral	T523, T508, T509, T510, T511, T512, P107, P108
801 (Terminated)	Bandar Utama	1 Utama Shopping Centre - Damansara–Puchong Expressway (LDP) - Persiaran Surian - Ikano Power Centre - IKEA Mutiara Damansara - The Curve - TESCO Mutiara Damansara - Jalan PJU 8/1 - Damansara Perdana - Damansara–Puchong Expressway (LDP) - Kampung Bukit Lanjan - Kampung Sungai Penchala - Penchala Toll Plaza - Persiaran Ara - Persiaran Perdana - Bandar Sri Damansara - Sek Keb Bandar Sri Damansara 3 - Persiaran Meranti - Paradesa Tropika Condominium - Paradesa Rustica Condominium - Kompleks Bakti Penyayang - SD I & II Apartment - Sek Keb Bandar Sri Damansara 1 - Sekolah Sri Bestari - Sri Damansara Apartment - Simpang Bandar Sri Damansara - Jalan Sungai Buloh-Kuala Selangor - Simpang Taman Bukit Maluri - Kepong Sentral KTM Komuter - Kompleks Desa - Pekan Kepong - Jalan Kepong - Jusco Metro Prima	Metro Prima via Bandar Sri Damansara	100, 103, 104, 107, 120, T106, T112 (Terminated), T113 (Terminated)
802 (Terminated)	Kelana Jaya LRT	Damansara–Puchong Expressway (LDP) - Sime Darby Specialist Centre Megah - Kolej Damansara Utama (KDU) - Sprint Expressway - Jalan SS 21/1 - Damansara Utama (Uptown) - Jalan SS 21/56 - Damansara–Puchong Expressway (LDP) - Persiaran Bandar Utama - Lebuh Bandar Utama - Dataran Bandar Utama - Central Park Avenue - Bandar Utama - 1 Utama Shopping Centre - Damansara–Puchong Expressway (LDP) - Persiaran Surian - IKEA Mutiara Damansara - Ikano Power Centre - Pelangi Damansara Condominium - Palm Spring Damansara Condominium - Dataran Sunway - Persiaran Mahogani - Jalan Merbah 11/1 - Dedap Apartment - Jalan Merbah 11/2 - Jalan Kenyalang 11/3 - Persiaran Mahogani - Jalan Sepah Puteri 5/1 - Section 5 Kota Damansara - Camilia Apartment - Flat Gugusan Siantan - Persiaran Kenanga - Jalan Cecawi 6 - Section 6 Kota Damansara - Flat Teratai, Jalan Cecawi 6 - Sek Keb Seksyen 6 Kota Damansara - Jalan Cecawi 6/19 - Jalan Cecawi 6/18 - Persiaran Surian	Section 6 Kota Damansara via Bandar Utama	780, T801
PJ05	Bandar Utama		Taman Bahagia LRT station via Damansara Jaya	T783, T784, PJ03, PJ04
PJ06	Bandar Utama	1 Utama Shopping Centre - Damansara–Puchong Expressway (LDP) - Mutiara Damansara MRT station - The Curve - TESCO Mutiara Damansara - Jalan PJU 8/1 - Damansara Perdana - Damansara–Puchong Expressway (LDP) - Kampung Bukit Lanjan - Kampung Sungai Penchala - Penchala Toll Plaza - Persiaran Ara - Persiaran Perdana - Bandar Sri Damansara - Sek Keb Bandar Sri Damansara 3 - Persiaran Meranti - Paradesa Tropika Condominium - Paradesa Rustica Condominium - Kompleks Bakti Penyayang - SD I & II Apartment - Sek Keb Bandar Sri Damansara 1 - Sekolah Sri Bestari - Sri Damansara Apartment - Simpang Bandar Sri Damansara - SMK Damansara Damai - Apartment Impian - Apartment Permai - Apartment Lestari - Jalan PJU 10/1	Damansara Damai via Bandar Sri Damansara	103, T103, T106

Routes T811 and T812 connecting to Bandar Utama MRT station do not stop here.

== Other services ==
- Aeroline Express Bus - an executive bus service to Singapore operates from here serving travellers directly to Singapore and Penang.
- First Coach Express Bus - an executive coach service operates routes to several destinations in Singapore too albeit its office and departure hall is from One World Hotel.

== Gallery ==
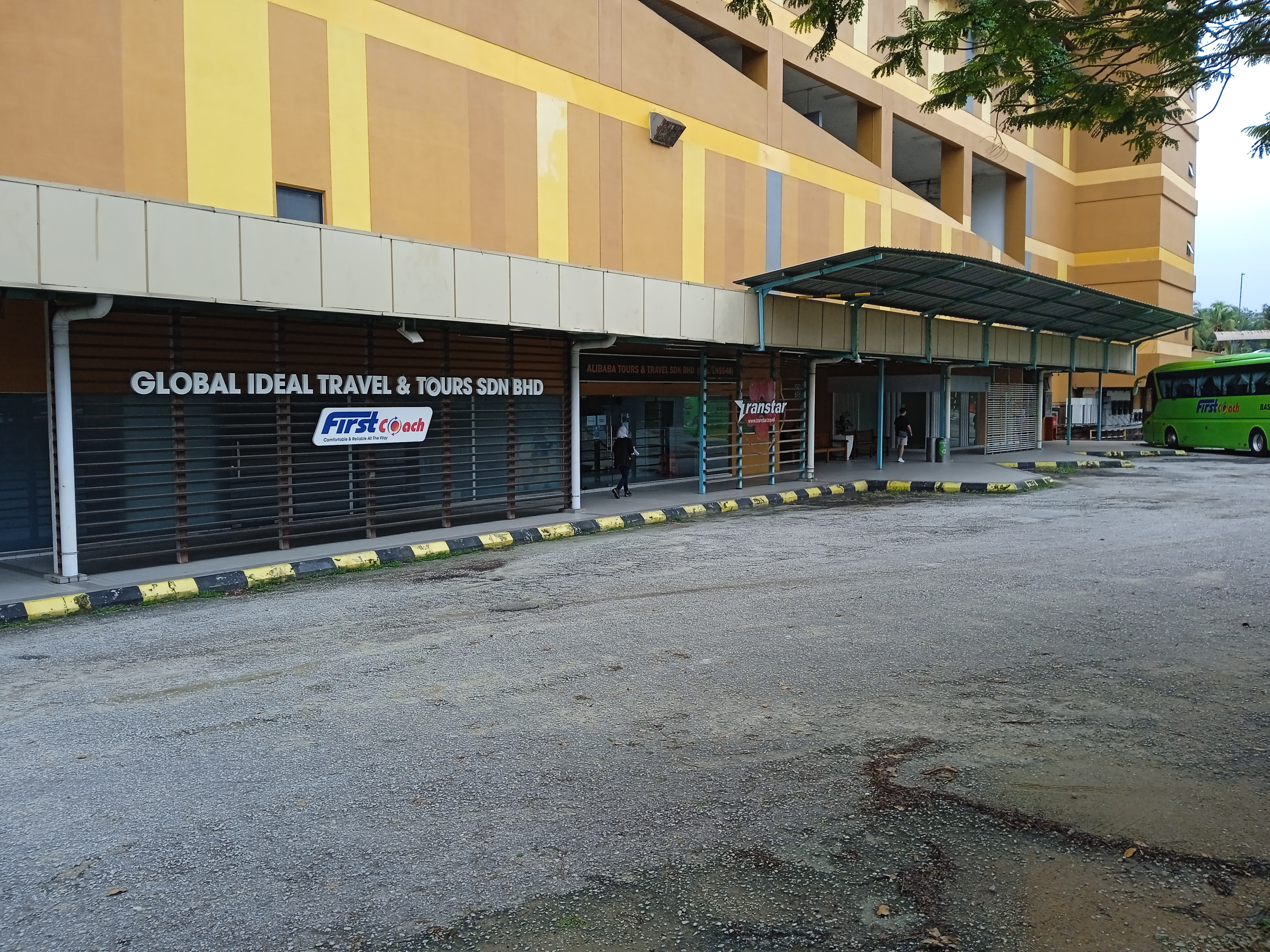
Intercity bus platform of Bandar Utama bus hub

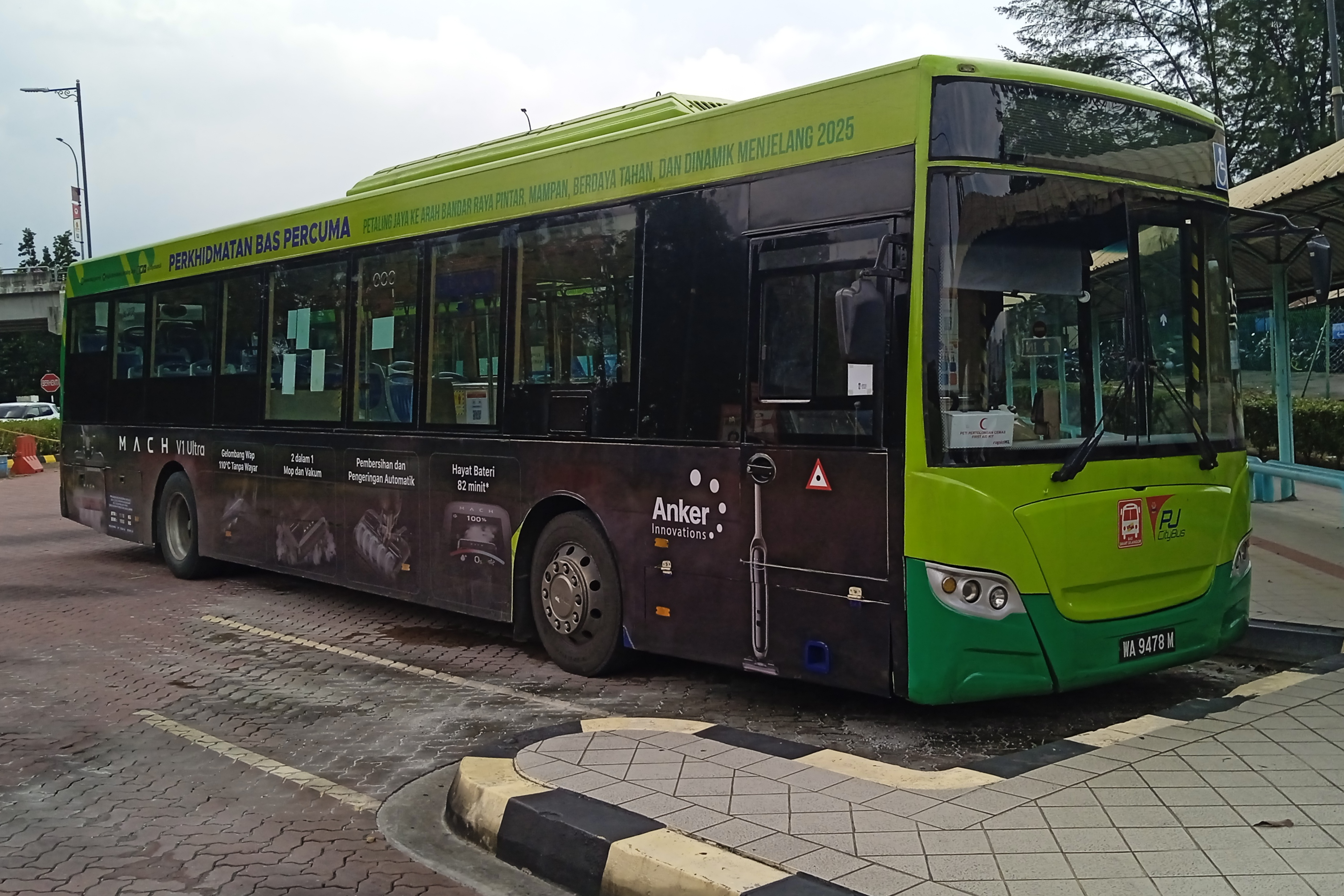
PJ City Bus route PJ06

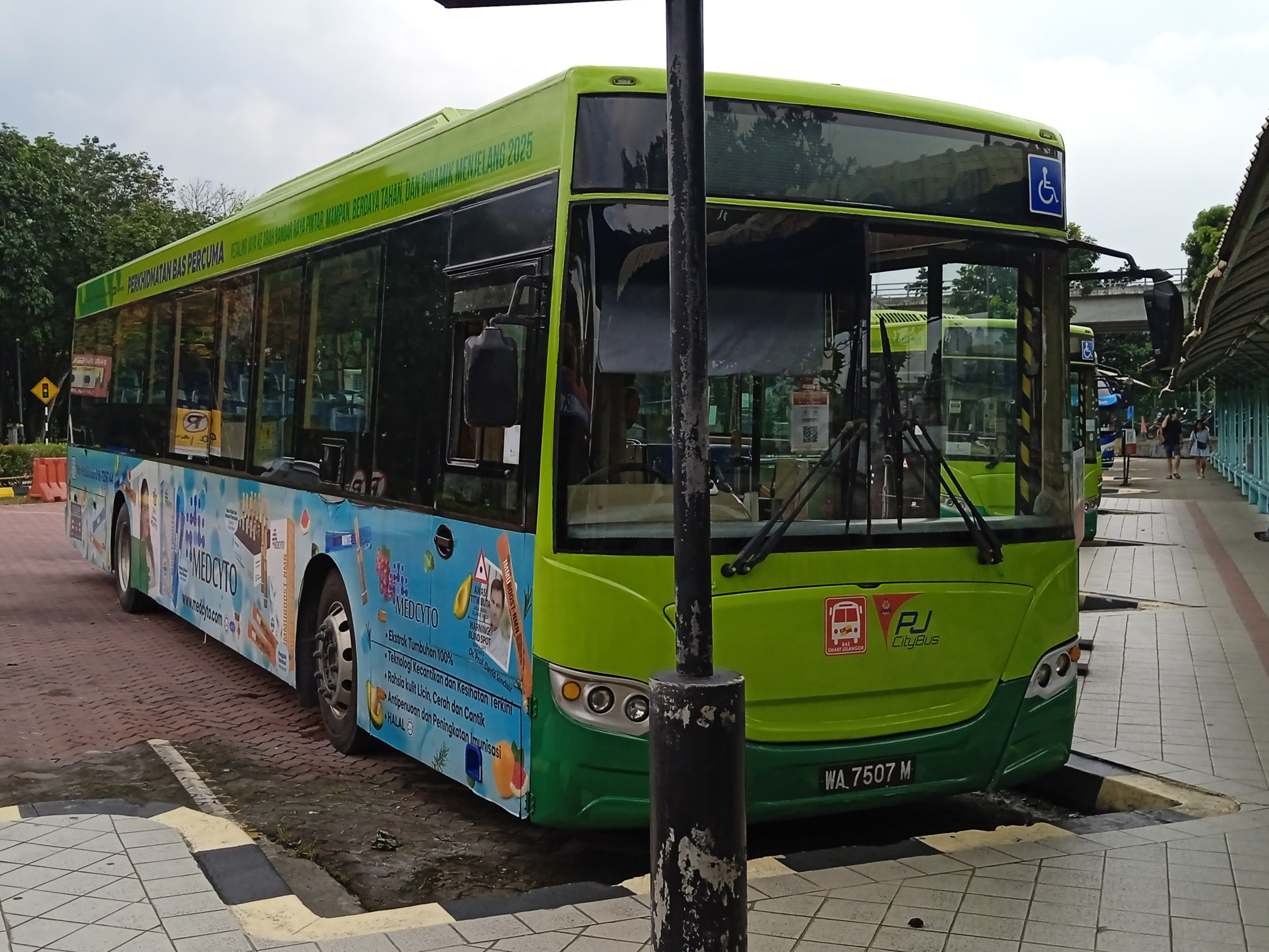
PJ City Bus route PJ05

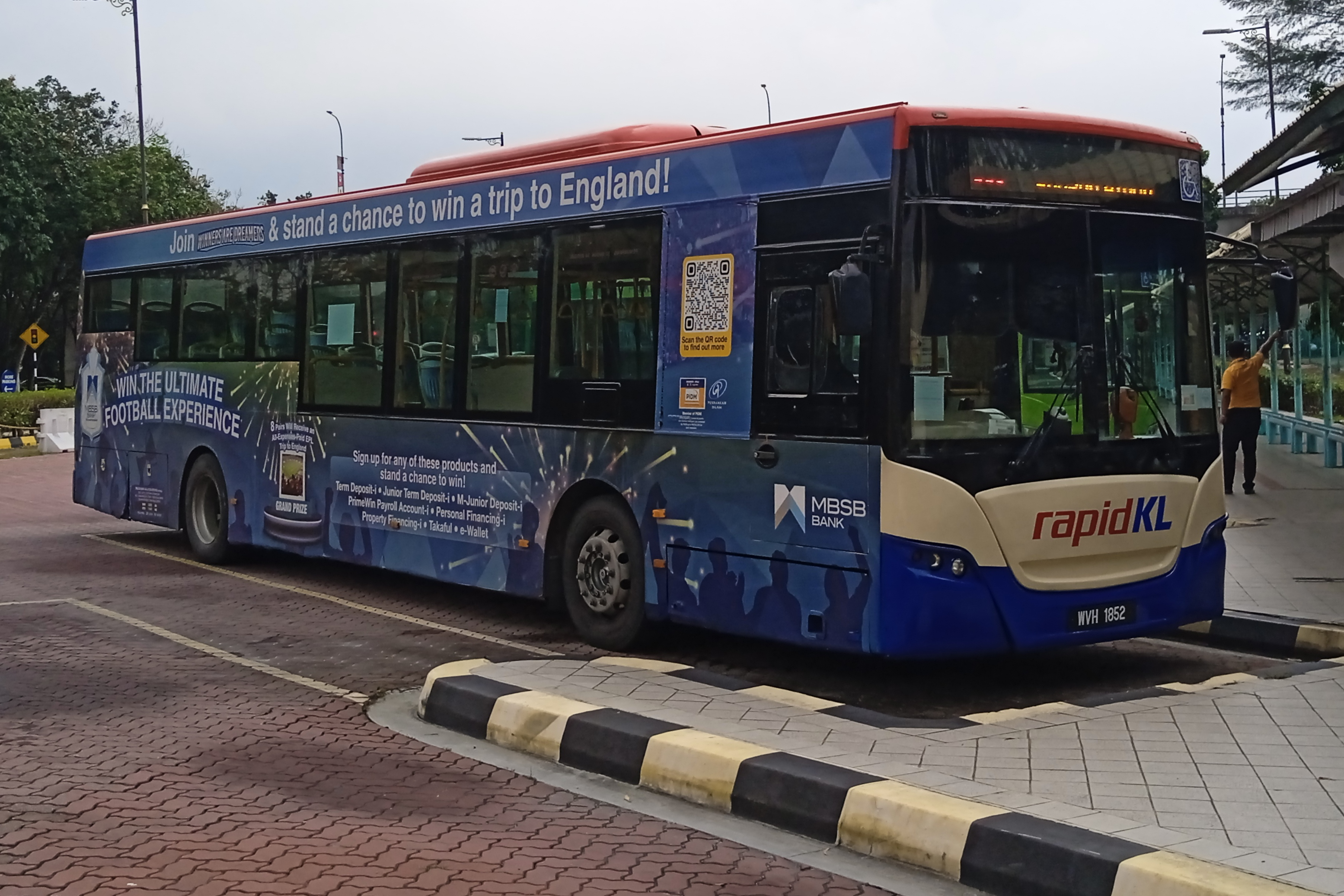
Rapid KL bus route 801
