= Damansara =

Damansara may refer to:

- Damansara, Selangor, a mukim of the Petaling district, state of Selangor, Malaysia

Constituencies

- Damansara, a federal constituency in Selangor, Malaysia
- Damansara, a former federal constituency in the Federal Territories, Malaysia
- Damansara Utama (state constituency), a state constituency in Selangor, Malaysia
- Kota Damansara (state constituency), a state constituency in Selangor, Malaysia

Other places

- Damansara River, a river in the state of Selangor, Malaysia
- Kota Damansara, a suburb in Sungai Buloh subdistrict of Petaling Jaya city
- Damansara Jaya
- Damansara Perdana
- Kwasa Damansara
- Mutiara Damansara
- Bandar Sri Damansara
- Ara Damansara
- Damansara Town Centre
- Bukit Damansara
- Bandar Damansara Kuantan
- Taman Damansara Aliff
- Jalan Damansara
