= Damansara, Selangor =

Suburb in Petaling Jaya

Coordinates: 3.052008°N 101.558223°E

Damansara is a suburb in Petaling Jaya, a mukim in Petaling District, as well as a parliamentary constituency in Selangor, Malaysia. It is named after the Damansara River which flows nearby. It is one of the most densely populated areas in Malaysia. According to the 2000 Census of Malaysia, it was the second-largest district subdivision in Malaysia in terms of population with 453,420 residents.

== Definition ==
Mukim Damansara (in red) vs. the parliamentary constituency of Damansara (in cyan)

The area defined as Damansara has changed over time.

During colonial era, and until 1974, the mukim (commune/sub-district) of Damansara, being part of Klang before 1974, covered the state capital Shah Alam, Subang Jaya, Bandar Sunway, Kelana Jaya, Kota Kemuning and parts of Putra Heights. It was named after the Damansara River which flows through the commune. The mukim of Damansara, transferred to the new Petaling District in February 1974, roughly corresponds to the parliamentary constituencies of Shah Alam, Subang and Kota Raja.

Later, the definition of what constituted Damansara shifted north. Now Damansara mostly refers to the areas in the northern part of Petaling Jaya's city area, bordered by Kelana Jaya in the south, Kepong and Segambut in the east, Sungai Buloh in the north and west, covering the constituencies of Damansara, Petaling Jaya and Sungai Buloh.

Some townships such as Kota Damansara, Bandar Sri Damansara and Damansara Damai, though carrying the Damansara name, partially lie in the Sungai Buloh constituency.

== Origins ==
Damansara was originally a small harbour-like settlement that was located near the mouth of the Damansara River along the Klang River. In the mid-1870s, it was the final destination for steamboats used by the British to travel to Kuala Lumpur from Klang as the steam boats used cannot go as far as the center of Kuala Lumpur near the junction of Gombak River and Klang River. Travellers would then go from Damansara to Kuala Lumpur via the Damansara Road which finished at Brickfields in Kuala Lumpur.

One popular theory suggests that the name is fossilized as a result of spelling mistake, and the place was originally named Damar Sara, as marked in a map of 1882. 'Damar' means resin obtained from any of a number of tropical, chiefly Indo-Malaysian trees, used to make varnish, while 'Sara' means precious or important in Sanskrit. It has been speculated that the then British Resident and land registrar, Sir William Maxwell, had accidentally mistook the ‘r’ for an ‘n’ and merged the words ‘Damar Sara’ into ‘Damansara' when he implements Selangor Registration of Titles Regulation on 1891. Damansara was originally a small river port, and the harbour was known as Labuhan Sara – Labuhan means a place for ships to anchor, while sara can be taken to mean "departure" or "embarkation" (related to the word bersara meaning retirement).

However, this theory is unlikely to be true since there exists written and cartographic records which suggest that the Damansara was already in use earlier. The spelling was used by the second Resident of Selangor, William Douglas in his diary entry (July 21, 1867) when he traveled to Kuala Lumpur for the first time; and it can also be found a map sent to Edward Maxwell by Frank Swettenham in March 1883.

== Townships ==
The Damansara area is home to several townships, but most of the subdivision falls under the administration of Petaling Jaya City Council. It includes the following townships:

Petaling Jaya city sections

- Damansara Impian (SS 20)
- Damansara Kim (SS 20)
- Damansara Utama (SS 21)
- Damansara Jaya (SS 22)
- Ara Damansara (previously known as Ladang Pilmoor, or Pilmoor Estate in English) (PJU 1A)
- Aman Suria Damansara (PJU 1A)
- Damansara Idaman (PJU 1A)
- Damansara Lagenda (PJU 1A)
- Pelangi Damansara (PJU 3)
- Tropicana Golf & Country Resort (PJU 3)
- Tropicana Indah (previously known as Damansara Indah) (PJU 3)
- Sunway Damansara (PJU 5)
- Kota Damansara (PJU 5)
- Damansara Emas (PJU 5)
- Bandar Utama Damansara (PJU 6)
- Mutiara Damansara (PJU 7)
- Damansara Perdana (PJU 8)
- Bukit Lanjan/Central Park Damansara (PJU 8)
- Flora Damansara (PJU 8)
- ForestHill Damansara (PJU 8)
- Bandar Sri Damansara (PJU 9)
- Damansara Damai (PJU 10)
- Sutera Damansara (PJU 10)
- Saujana Damansara (PJU 10)
- Casa Hezri De Mevlana

== Commercial prospects ==
Damansara has been dubbed the "Golden Triangle" of Petaling Jaya. Commercially, it is positioned to do well, boasting a Tesco outlet, IPC Shopping Centre, One Utama, the largest IKEA outlet in Southeast Asia, as well as The Curve shopping complex, all of them located within a stone's throw of each other.

Besides that, the Uptown commercial area, which houses the Malaysian branch of several multi-national companies, is located in Damansara Utama.

== Political representation ==
Due to electoral purposes, Damansara was redelineated into two voting districts for Parliamentary representation. One is the constituency of Sungai Buloh, held by Sivarasa Rasiah, a member of the People's Justice Party while the other is the eponymous constituency of Damansara, held by Tony Pua of the Democratic Action Party. Both parties are part of the opposition alliance, Pakatan Rakyat. In the Selangor State Assembly, the communities are represented by Jamaliah Jamaluddin from the Democratic Action Party for the constituency of Bandar Utama, Lim Yi Wei, also from the Democratic Action Party for the constituency of Kampung Tunku, and Wong Keat Ping from the People's Justice Party for the constituency of Bukit Lanjan. The state seat of Kota Damansara was transferred to Sungai Buloh constituency in 2016 and is currently held by Shatiri Mansor from PKR.
