= Postal codes in Malaysia =

Postal codes in Malaysia, usually referred to as postcodes (Malay: poskod), are five digit numeric.

The first two digits of the postcode denote the state or federal territory (e.g. 42000 Port Klang, Selangor). However, postcode area boundaries may cross state borders, as areas near to state borders may be served by post offices located in another state, and therefore use postcodes of the assigned post offices.

== History ==
Malaysia's current postcode system was initiated by M. Rajasingam, director-general of Pos Malaysia from 1976 to 1986. In 1976, only addresses in Kuala Lumpur had postcodes. Wanting to expand the postcode system to the whole country, Rajasingam enlisted the help of the French postal authorities. The postcode system made the process of sorting out mail smoother, as it was easier for machines to recognise the numbers. In 2014, Rajasingam was honoured with the Darjah Panglima Jasa Negara (PJN), which carries the title of "Datuk", for his contributions to the postal service.

== Areas ==
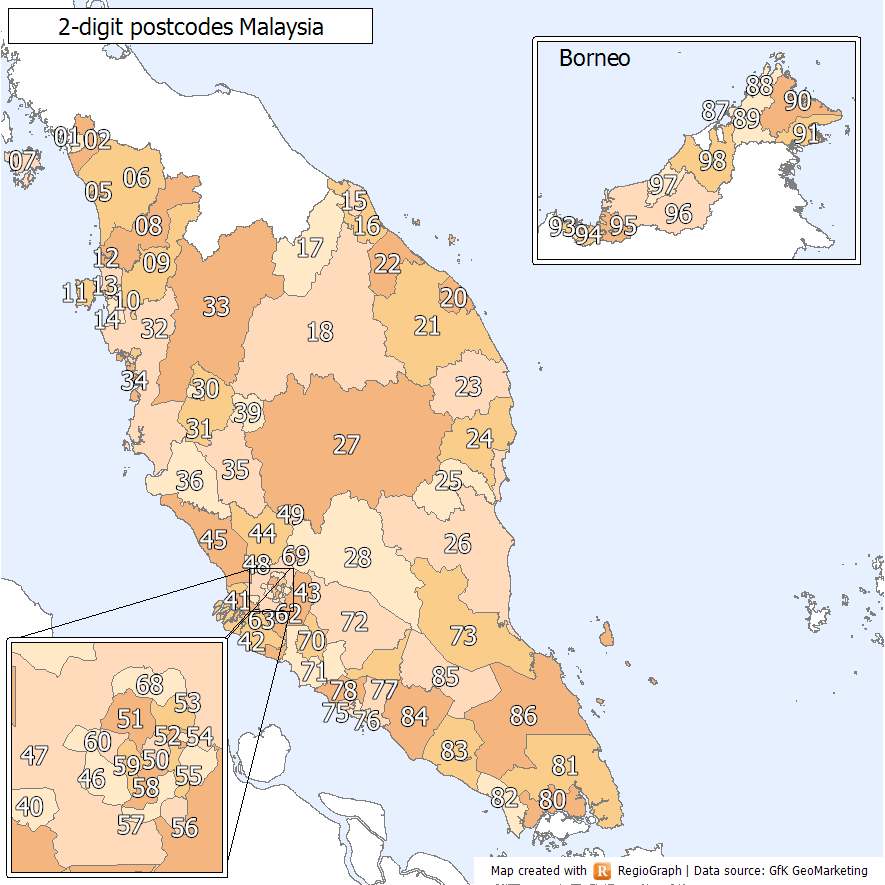
2-digit postcode areas Malaysia (defined through the first two postcode digits)

Listed below are the first 2 digits of codes assigned to each state and federal territory. The state capital for each state is indicated in brackets.

=== Federal Territories ===
- Kuala Lumpur uses codes from 50000 to 60000 (Including a few areas such as Cheras, Taman Melawati, Bukit Lanjan, Bandar Sri Damansara, Pandan Indah which are actually in Selangor), and 68100 (Taman Wahyu and Kuala Lumpur Wholesale Market under the Kuala Lumpur jurisdiction)
- Putrajaya uses codes from 62300 to 62988
- Labuan uses codes from 87xxx to 87033

=== States ===
- Selangor (Shah Alam) uses codes from 40xxx to 48300, 63xxx to 68100
- Terengganu (Kuala Terengganu) uses codes from 20xxx to 24300
- Sarawak (Kuching) uses codes from 93xxx to 98859
- Sabah (Kota Kinabalu) uses codes from 88xxx to 91309 (Including Layang-Layang Island)
- Kedah (Alor Setar) uses codes from 05xxx to 09810
- Kelantan (Kota Bharu) uses codes from 15xxx to 18500
- Negeri Sembilan (Seremban) uses codes from 70xxx to 73509
- Penang/Pulau Pinang (George Town) uses codes from 10xxx to 14400
- Johor (Johor Bahru) uses codes from 79xxx to 86900
- Malacca/Melaka (Malacca City) uses codes from 75xxx to 78309
- Perlis (Kangar) uses codes from 01xxx to 02xxx
- Perak (Ipoh) uses codes from 30xxx to 36810
- Pahang (Kuantan) uses codes from 25xxx to 28800, 390xx to 39200 for Cameron Highlands, 49000 for Fraser's Hill and 69000 for Genting Highlands, 28xxx to 28350 for Temerloh district

== Notable postcodes ==
Chief Minister office uses codes from xx502
City / Town	Postal Code	Post Office
YAB Menteri Besar Johor	79502	Iskandar Puteri
YAB Ketua Menteri Melaka	75502	Bandar Melaka
YAB Ketua Menteri Sabah	88502	Kota Kinabalu
YAB Premier Sarawak	93502	Bandar Kuching
YAB Menteri Besar Perlis	01502	Kangar
YAB Menteri Besar Kedah	05502	Alor Setar
YAB Ketua Menteri Pulau Pinang	10502	Pulau Pinang (George Town)
YAB Menteri Besar Kelantan	15502	Kota Bharu
YAB Menteri Besar Terengganu	20502	Kuala Terengganu
YAB Menteri Besar Pahang	25502	Kuantan
YAB Menteri Besar Perak	30502	Ipoh
YAB Menteri Besar Selangor	40502	Shah Alam
YAB Menteri Besar Negeri Sembilan	70502	Seremban

Head of state uses codes from xx500
City / Town	Postal Code	Post Office
DYMM Tuanku Raja Perlis	01500	Kangar
DYMM Sultan Kedah	05500	Alor Setar
TYT Yang di-Pertua Negeri Pulau Pinang	10500	Pulau Pinang (George Town)
DYMM Sultan Kelantan	15500	Kota Bharu
DYMM Sultan Terengganu	20500	Kuala Terengganu
DYMM Sultan Pahang	25500	Kuantan
DYMM Sultan Perak	30500	Ipoh
DYMM Sultan Selangor	40500	Shah Alam
DYMM Yang Di Pertuan Besar Negeri Sembilan	70500	Seremban
TYT Yang di-Pertua Negeri Melaka	75500	Melaka
DYMM Sultan Johor	80500	Johor Bahru
TYT Yang di-Pertua Negeri Sabah	88500	Kota Kinabalu
TYT Yang di-Pertua Negeri Sarawak	93500	Kuching

== See also ==
- Addresses in Malaysia
