= Mutiara Damansara MRT station =

MRT station in Petaling Jaya, Selangor, Malaysia

KG08 Mutiara Damansara
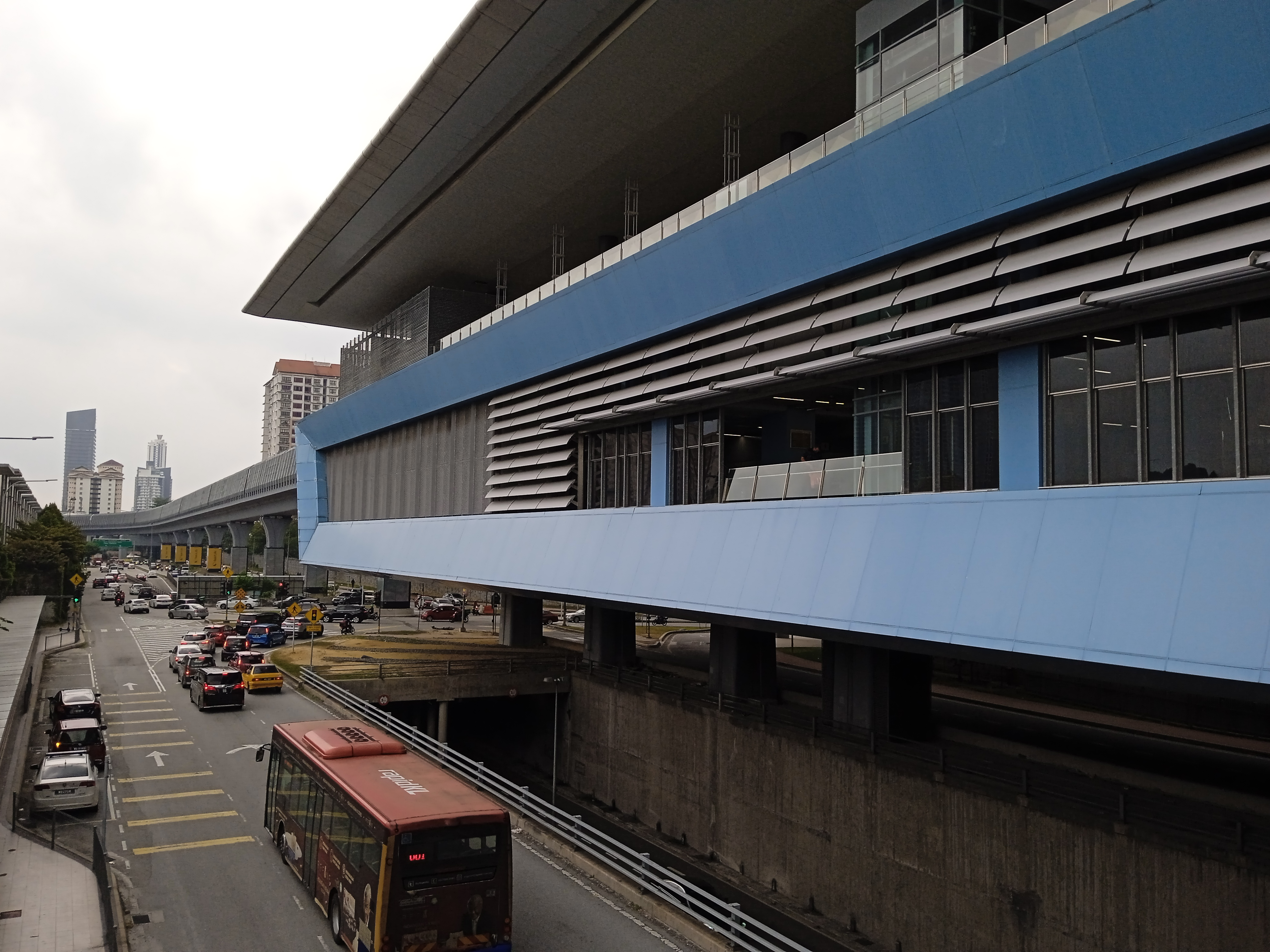
- Exterior view of the station above Persiaran Surian.

General information
- Other names: Malay: موتيارا دامنسارا (Jawi); Chinese: 珍珠白沙罗; Tamil: முத்தியாரா டாமன்சாரா
- Location: Persiaran Surian, Mutiara Damansara, PJU7, 47820 Petaling Jaya; Selangor; Malaysia
- Coordinates: 3°9′18.62″N 101°36′31.66″E
- System: Rapid KL
- Owner: MRT Corp
- Operator: Rapid Rail
- Line: 9 Kajang Line
- Platforms: 2 side platforms
- Tracks: 2

Construction
- Structure type: Elevated
- Parking: Not available
- Cycle facilities: Available. 18 bicycle bays.
- Accessible: Yes

Other information
- Station code: KG08

History
- Opened: 16 December 2016
- Former names: The Curve

Services
Preceding station		Following station
Surian towards Kwasa Damansara	Kajang Line	Bandar Utama towards Kajang
Location

The Mutiara Damansara MRT station is a mass rapid transit (MRT) station serving the suburb of Mutiara Damansara in Petaling Jaya, Selangor, Malaysia.

It is one of the stations of the MRT Kajang Line. The station was opened on 16 December 2016 when the first phase of the line was opened.

The station is located adjacent to the Mutiara Damansara commercial area, where The Curve Shopping Centre, Royale Chulan Hotel, IKEA Damansara, Lotus's Mutiara Damansara and other buildings are located.

== Station Features ==
The station adopts the standard elevated station design for the MRT Kajang Line, with two side platforms above the concourse level. The station is located above Persiaran Surian, with its supporting columns sited between the Persiaran Surian underpass and the at-grade Petaling Jaya-bound lanes of the road.

=== Station layout ===
L2	Platform Level	Side platform
L2	Platform Level	Platform 1: 9 Kajang Line towards KG35 Kajang (→)
L2	Platform Level	Platform 2: 9 Kajang Line towards KG04 Kwasa Damansara (←)
L2	Platform Level	Side platform
L1	Concourse	Faregates, Ticketing Machines, Customer Service Office, Station Control, Shops, pedestrian walkway to Surian Link
G	Ground Level	Entrance A, B and C with Feeder Bus Stop, Taxi Lay-By, Kiss and Ride Lay-By

=== Exits and entrances ===
Unlike most other elevated stations of the MRT Kajang line, the Mutiara Damansara station has four entrances, allowing it to be accessed from both sides of Persiaran Surian, both sides of Jalan PJU 7/1 as well as having a direct pedestrian link with neighbouring commercial buildings.

Kajang Line station
Entrance	Location	Destination	Picture
A	South side of Persiaran Surian	Feeder bus stop, trunk line bus stop, taxi and private vehicle lay-bys, Dataran Bandar Utama, Persiaran Bukit Utama, SMK Bandar Utama Damansara 4	
B	East side of Jalan PJU 7/1	Feeder bus stop, Royale Chulan Hotel main lobby	
C	West side of Jalan PJU 7/1	Feeder bus stop, Mutiara Damansara	
D	Pedestrian link to Surian Link	Surian Tower, Royale Chulan Hotel, The Curve, IPC Shopping Centre, Lotus's Mutiara Damansara	

== Bus Services ==
=== Feeder buses ===
With the opening of the Kajang Line (then known as the MRT Sungai Buloh-Kajang Line), feeder buses also began operating linking the station with several housing areas in Mutiara Damansara, Damansara Perdana, Bandar Utama and Bukit Lanjan. The feeder buses operate from the station's feeder bus stops adjacent to the station, accessed via Entrance B and Entrance C of the station.

Route No.	Origin	Desitination	Via
T809	KG08 Mutiara Damansara (Entrance C)	Damansara Perdana; Bandar Utama	Jalan PJU 7/7; Jalan PJU 7/15; Jalan PJU 8/1; Jalan PJU 7/1; KG08 Mutiara Damansara (Entrance B); Tengkat Bandar Utama; Central Park Avenue; 1 Utama Shopping Center New Wing; Damansara–Puchong Expressway; Persiaran Surian
T810	KG08 Mutiara Damansara (Entrance B)	Bukit Lanjan	Persiaran Surian; Jalan Damansara (Bukit Lanjan); Jalan PJU 8/8; Jalan PJU 7/1

=== Other buses ===
Route No.	Origin	Desitination	Via
780	KJ14 KG16 Pasar Seni	Section 8, Kota Damansara	Jalan Tun Tan Cheng Lock; Jalan Tun Sambanthan (KL Sentral); Jalan Bangsar; KJ16 Bangsar; FT 2 Federal Highway; Jalan Utara; Jalan Prof. Khoo Kay Kim (Jalan Semangat); Jalan SS 2/55; Damansara–Puchong Expressway (Bandar Utama); Persiaran Surian; KG08 Mutiara Damansara (Entrance A for Kota Damansara-bound, IKEA bus stop for Pasar Seni-bound); KG07 Surian (Entrance A for Kota Damansara-bound, Entrance B for Pasar Seni-bound); KG06 Kota Damansara (Entrance A for Kota Damansara-bound, Entrance B for Pasar Seni-bound); Persiaran Mahogani; Jalan Pekaka
801	Bandar Utama bus hub	PY09 Metro Prima	Central Park Avenue; Damansara–Puchong Expressway (Bandar Utama); KG08 Mutiara Damansara (Entrance C for Metro Prima-bound, Entrance B for Bandar Utama-bound); Jalan PJU 8/1; Damansara–Puchong Expressway (Penchala Toll Plaza); Persiaran Ara; Persiaran Meranti; Persiaran Perdana; FT 54 Jalan Kuala Selangor–Kepong; FT 28 Kuala Lumpur Middle Ring Road 2 (MRR2); Jalan Kepong; PY09 Metro Prima (Entrance A for Metro Prima-bound, Entrance B for Bandar Utama-bound)
802	KJ24 Kelana Jaya	Section 11, Kota Damansara	Damansara–Puchong Expressway; Persiaran Bandar Utama; KG09 SA01 Bandar Utama; Lebuh Bandar Utama; KG08 Mutiara Damansara (Entrance A for Kota Damansara-bound, IKEA bus stop for Kelana Jaya-bound); Jalan Camar
PJ06	Bandar Utama bus hub	Damansara Perdana; Bandar Sri Damansara; Damansara Damai	Central Park Avenue; Damansara–Puchong Expressway (Bandar Utama); KG08 Mutiara Damansara (Entrance C for Damansara Damai-bound, Entrance B for Bandar Utama-bound); Jalan PJU 8/1; Damansara–Puchong Expressway (Penchala Toll Plaza); Persiaran Ara; Persiaran Perdana; Jalan PJU 10/9; Jalan PJU 10/1A; Jalan PJU 10/1

== Gallery ==
=== Station ===
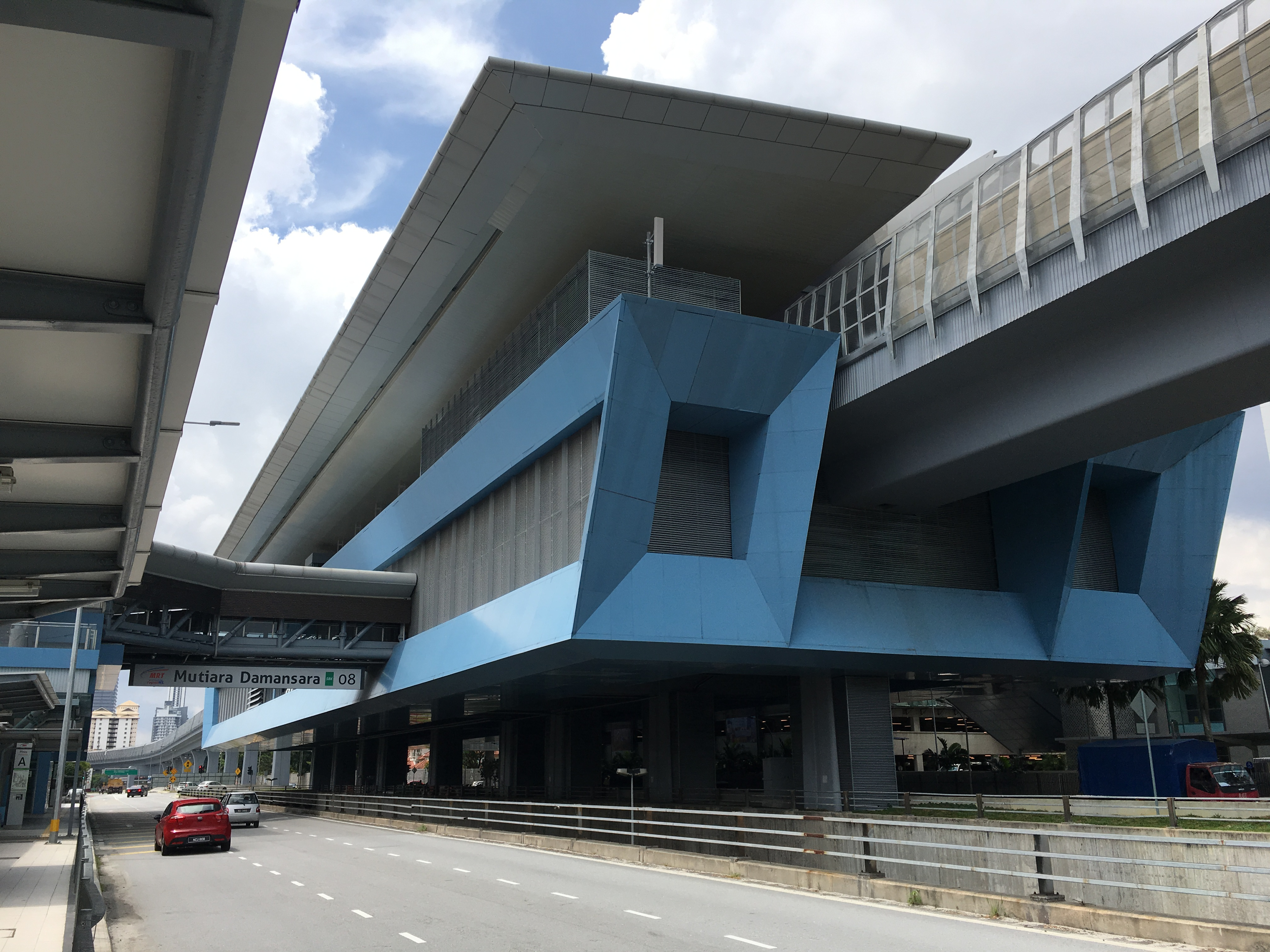
View of the station above Persiaran Surian from street level

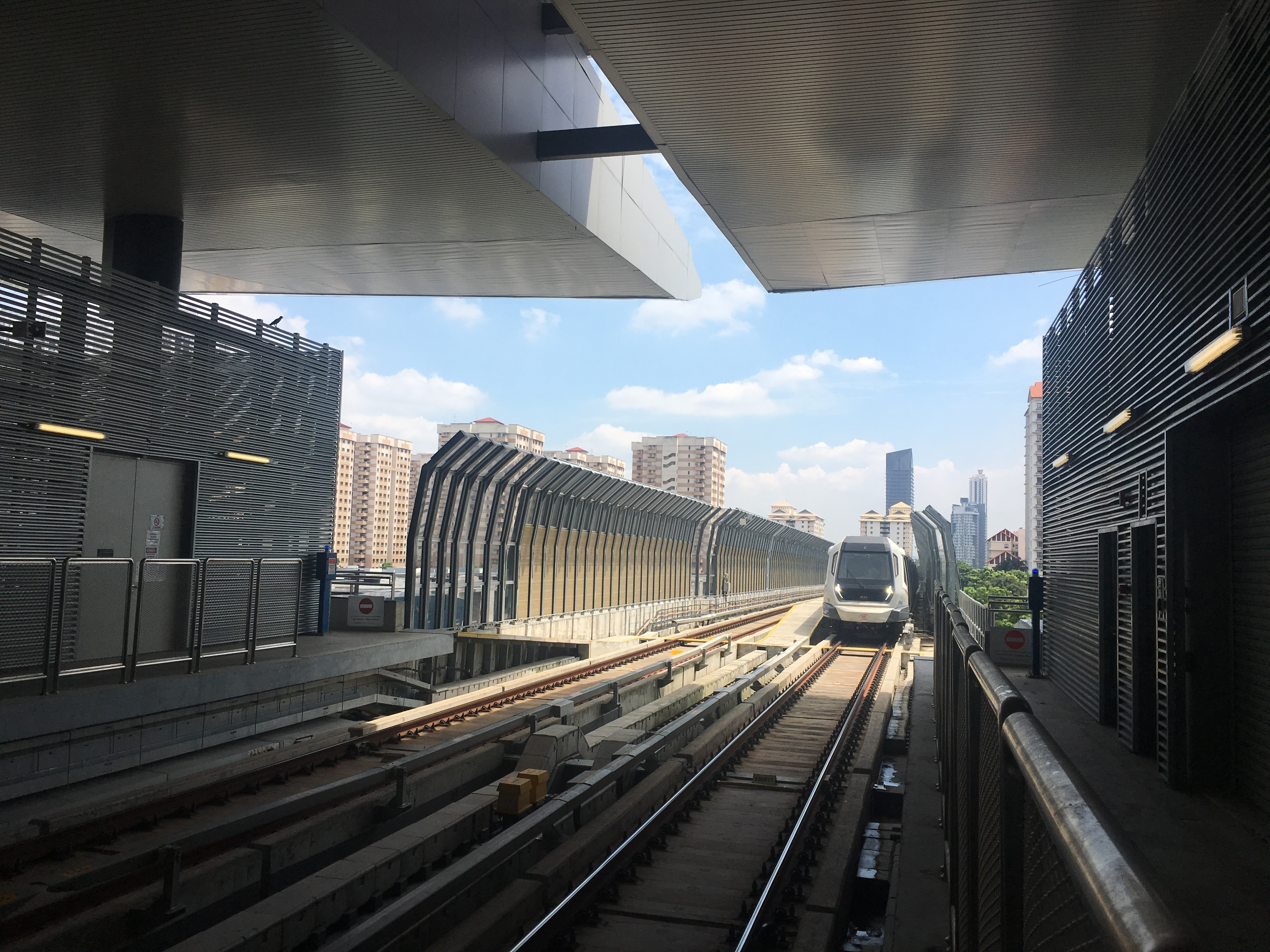
Train from Sungai Buloh approaching the Mutiara Damansara MRT station

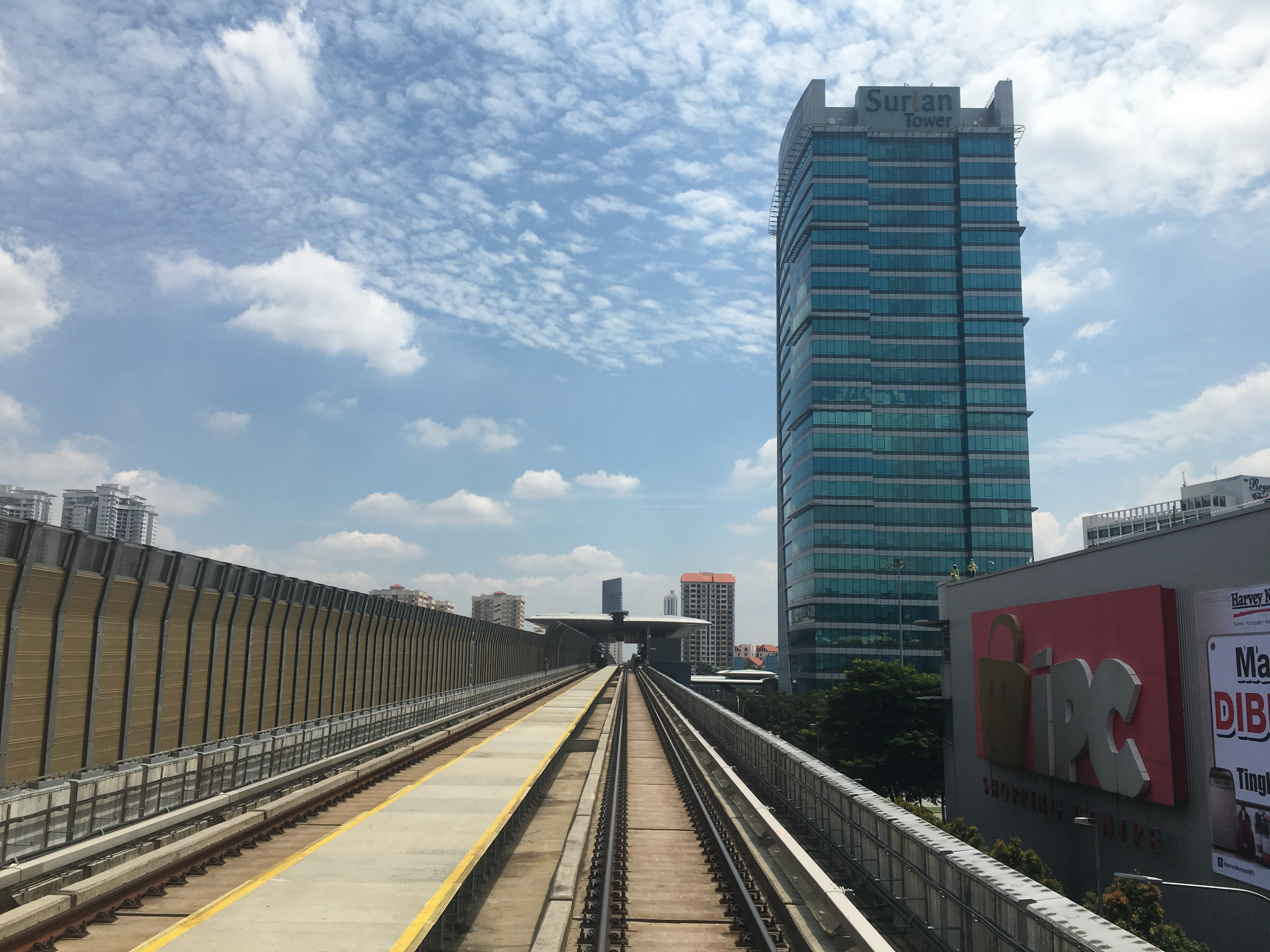
View of the Mutiara Damansara MRT station from the east

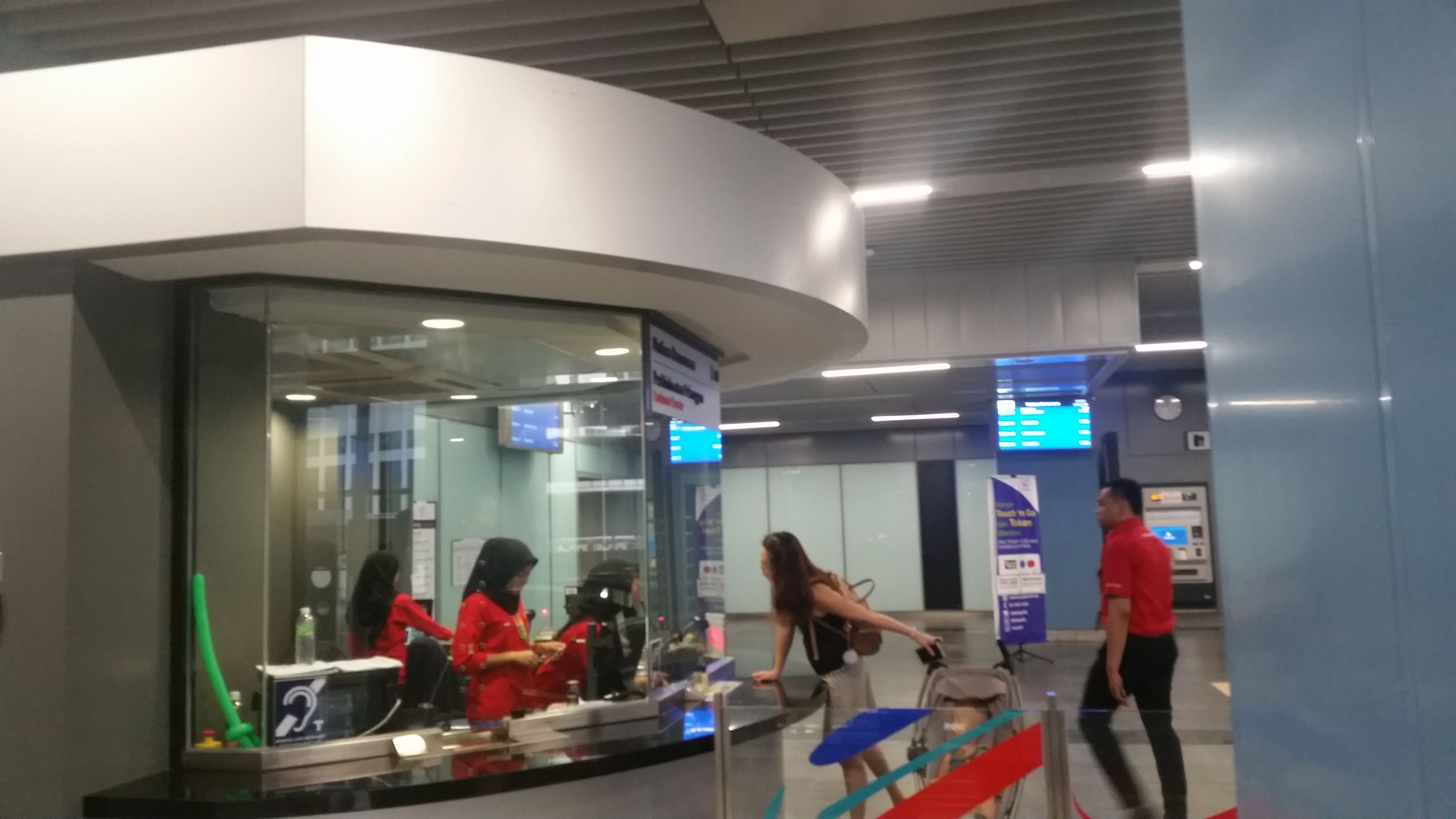
The information counter at Mutiara Damansara MRT

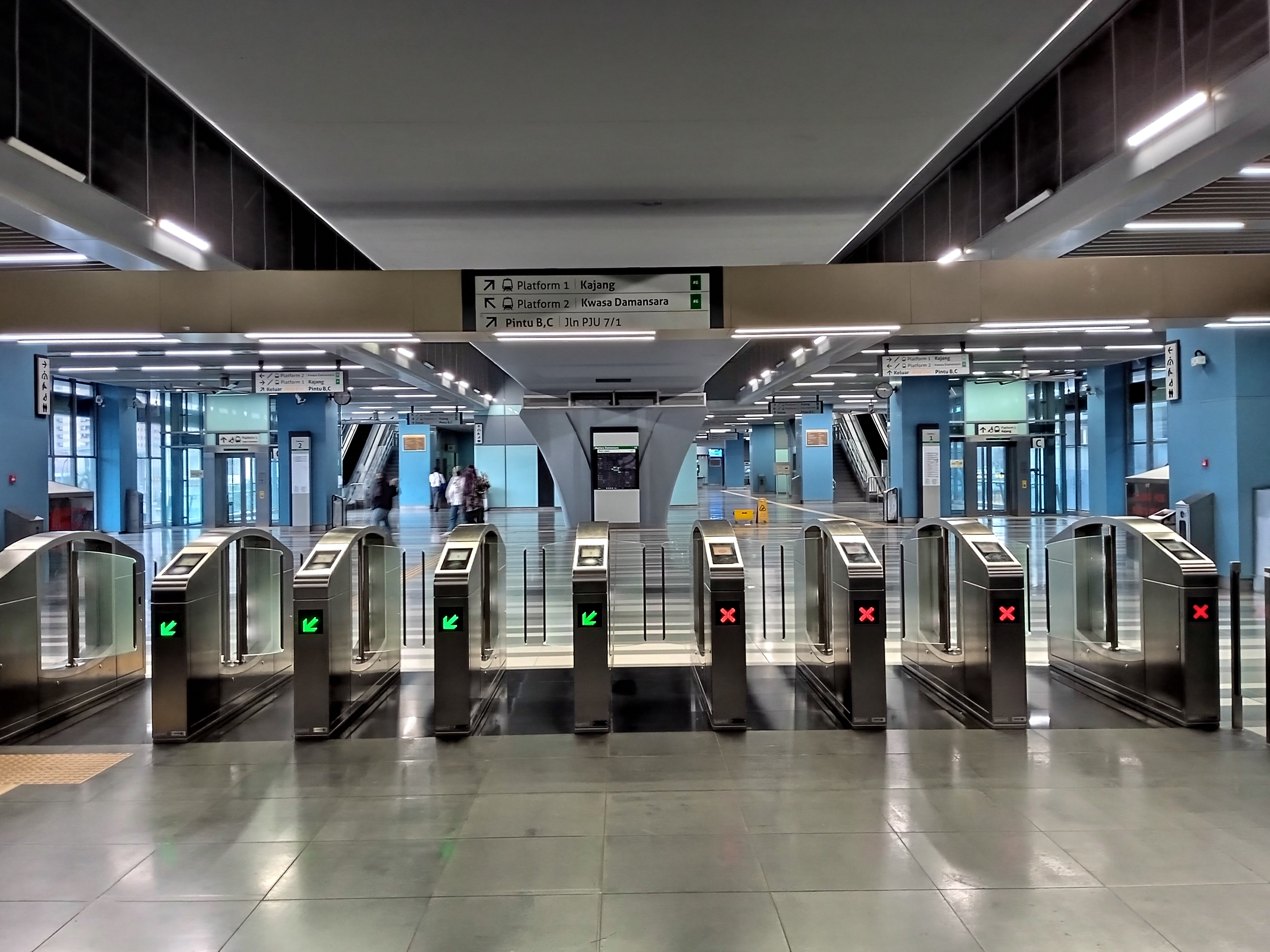
The ticketing counter at Mutiara Damansara MRT station

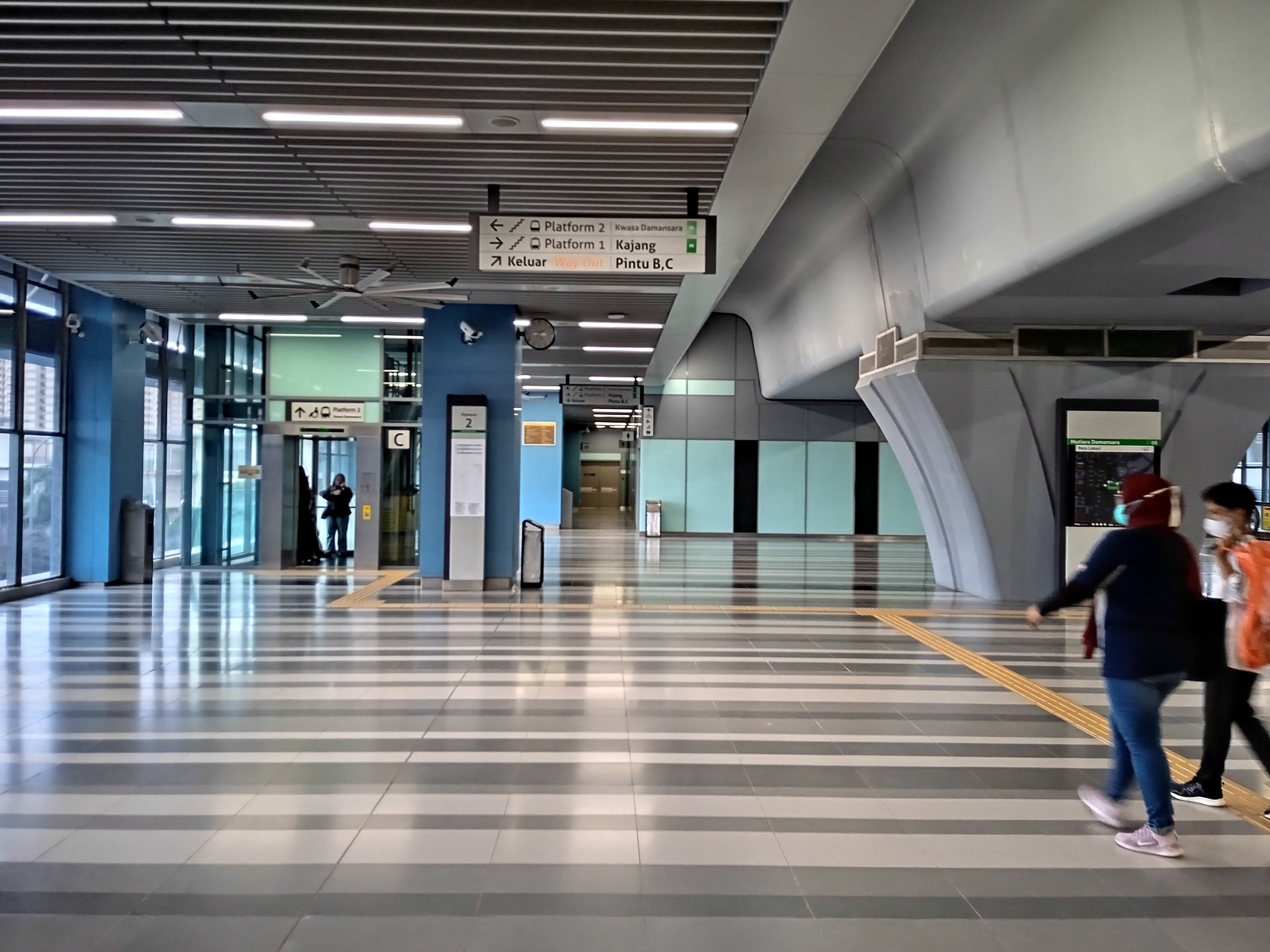
Leading to the platforms at Mutiara Damansara MRT station

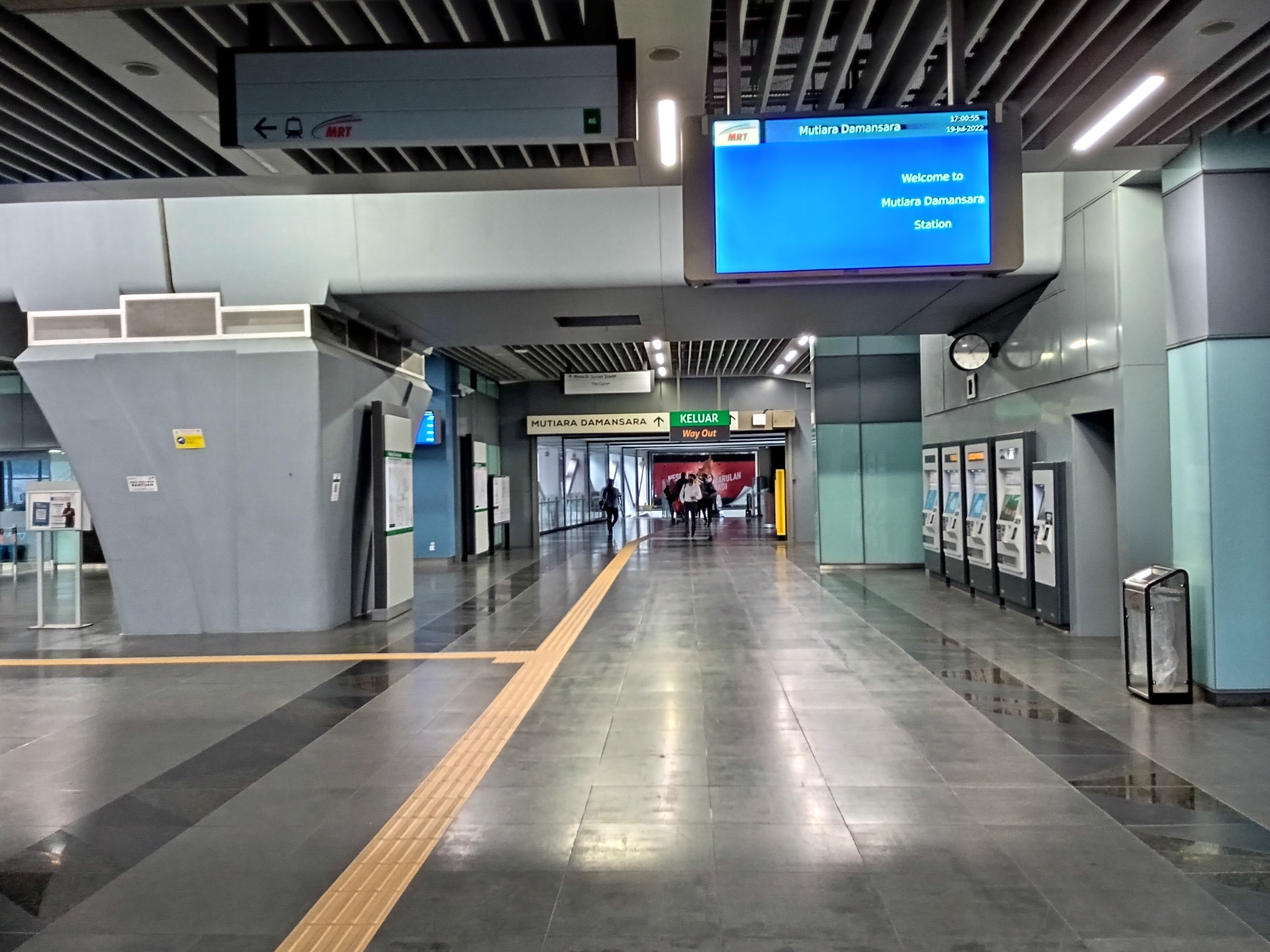
The concourse of Mutiara Damansara MRT station

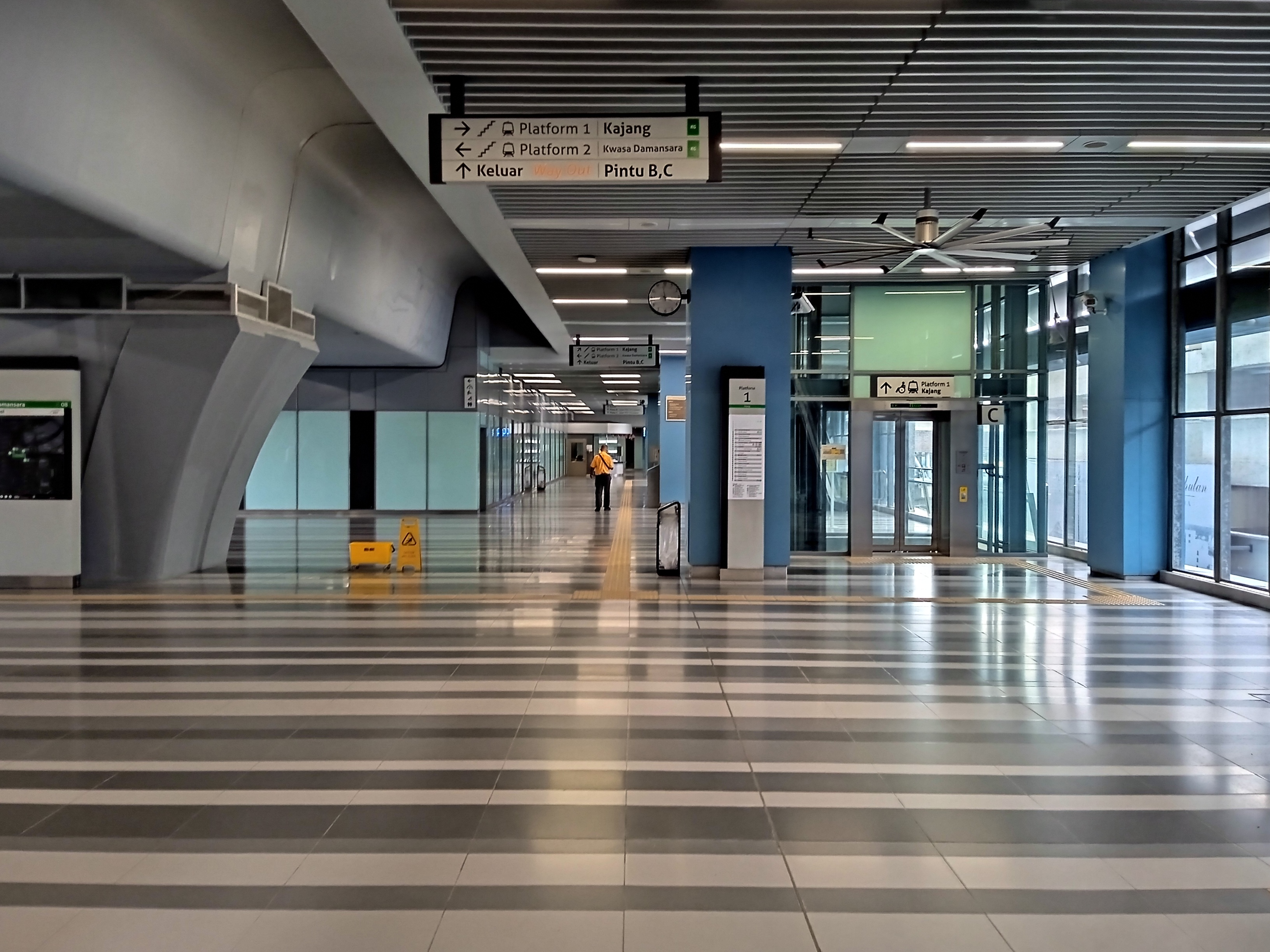
The concourse of Mutiara Damansara MRT station

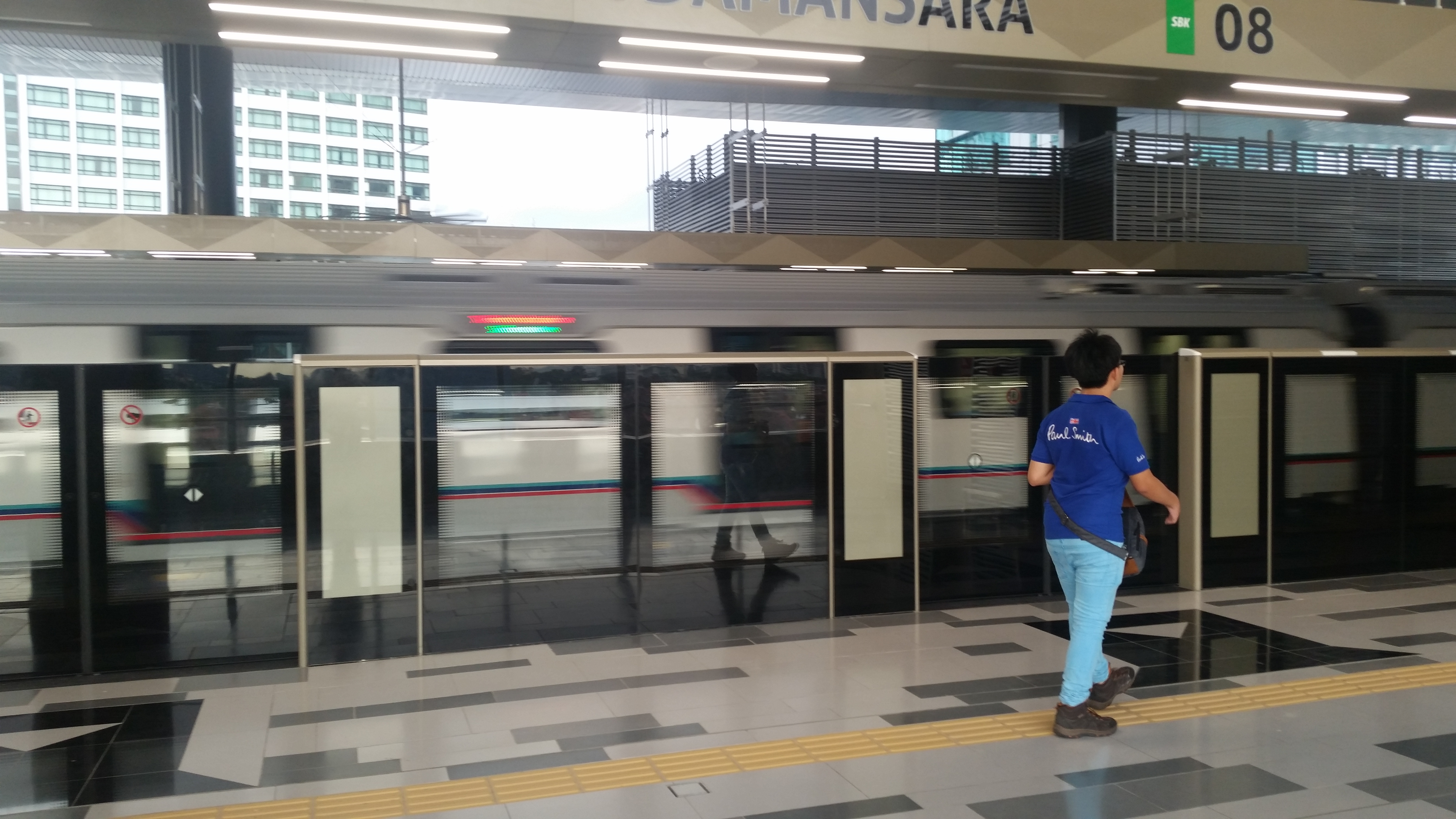
An MRT train stopping at Mutiara Damansara MRT station

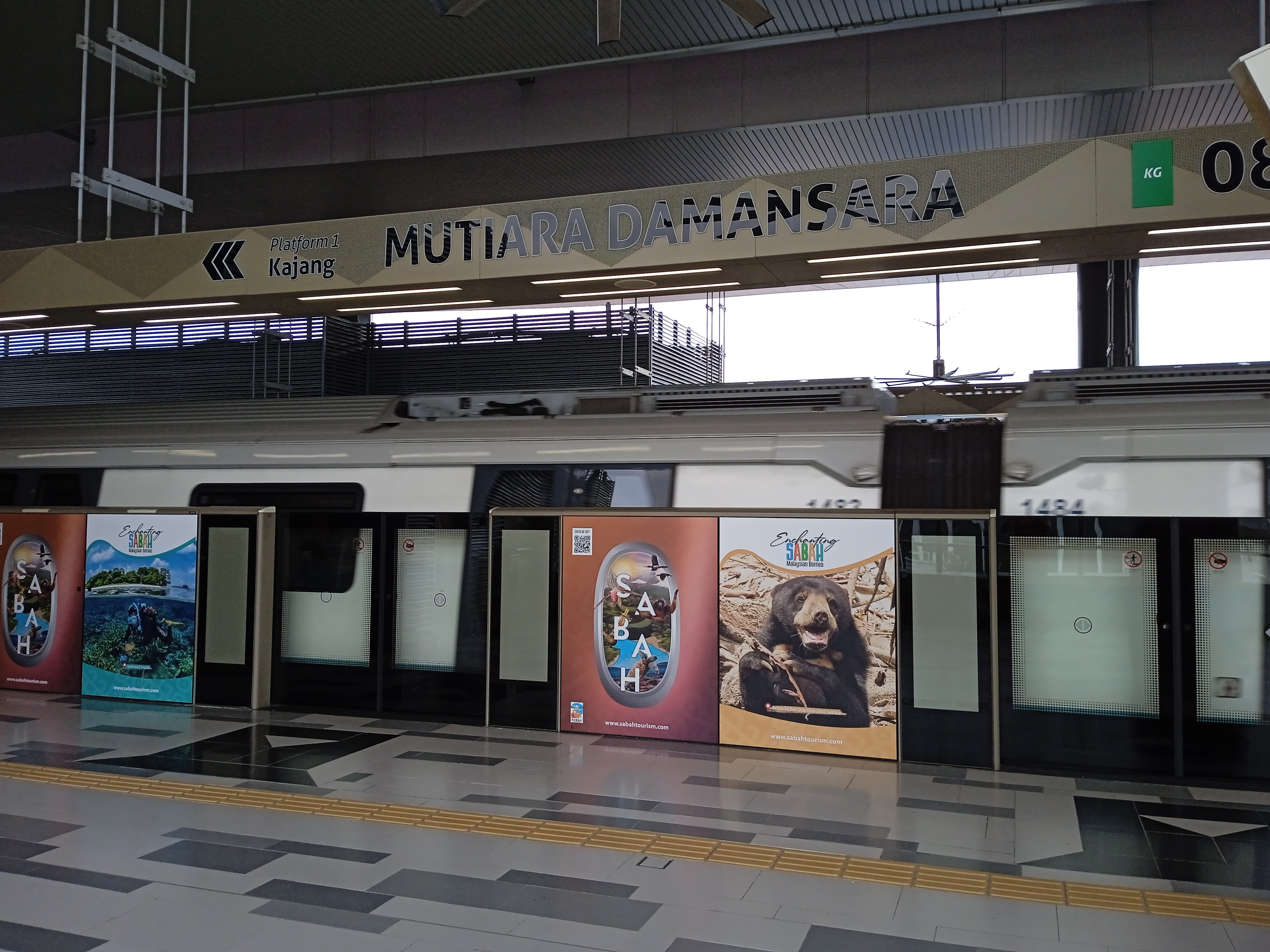
Kajang-bound platform at the station

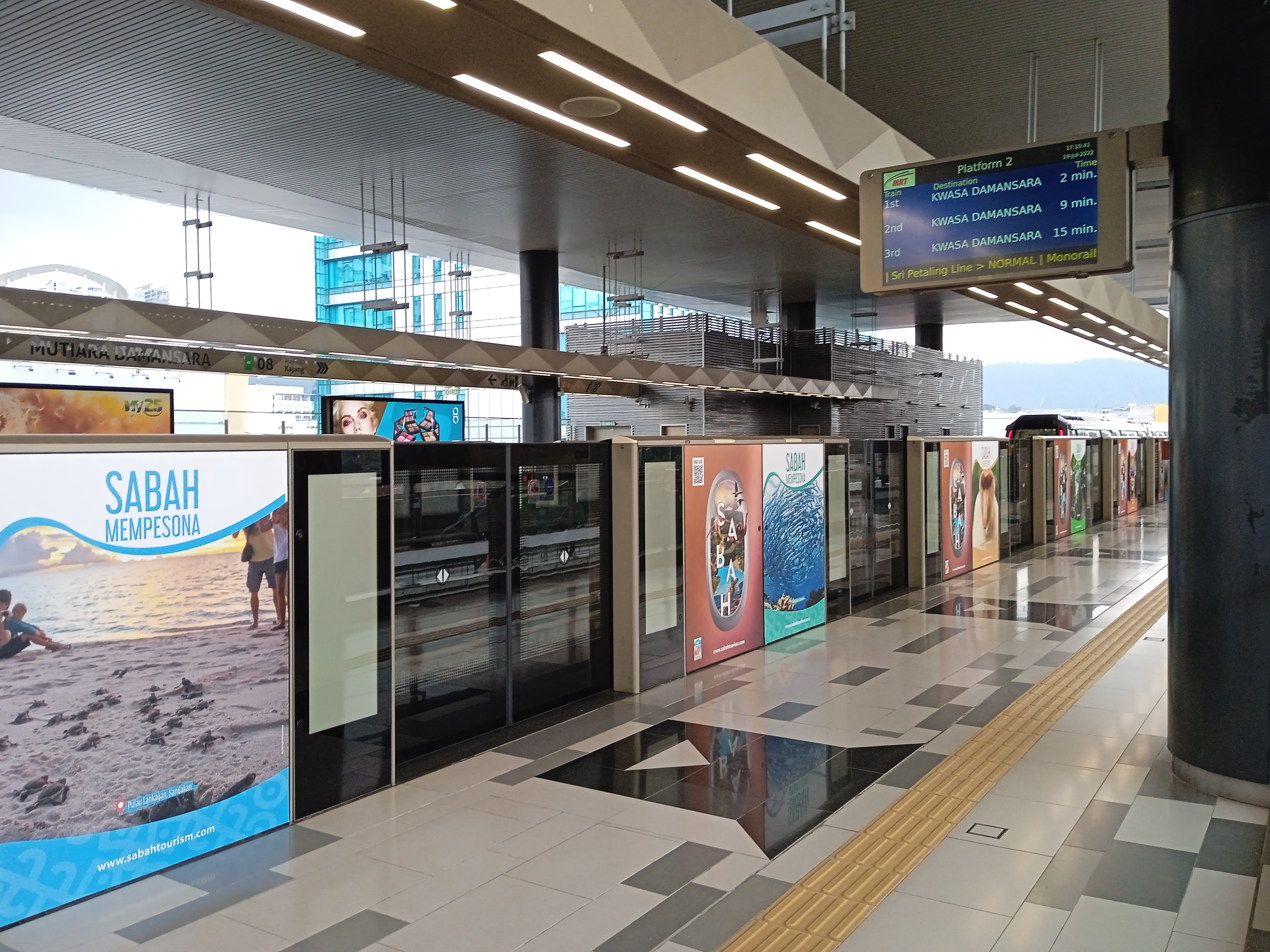
Kwasa Damansara-bound platform at the station

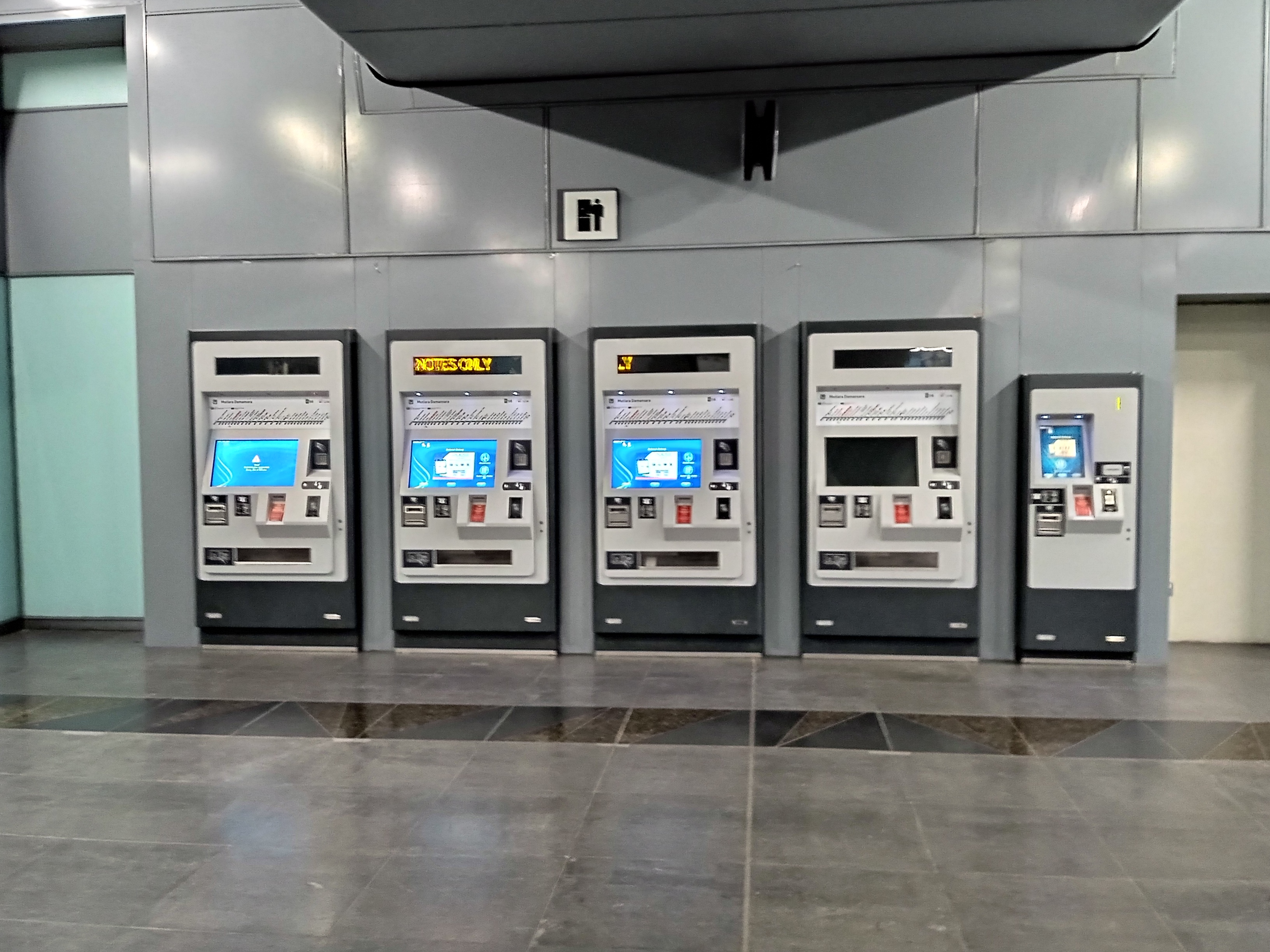
A ticket machine in Mutiara Damansara station

=== Entrances ===
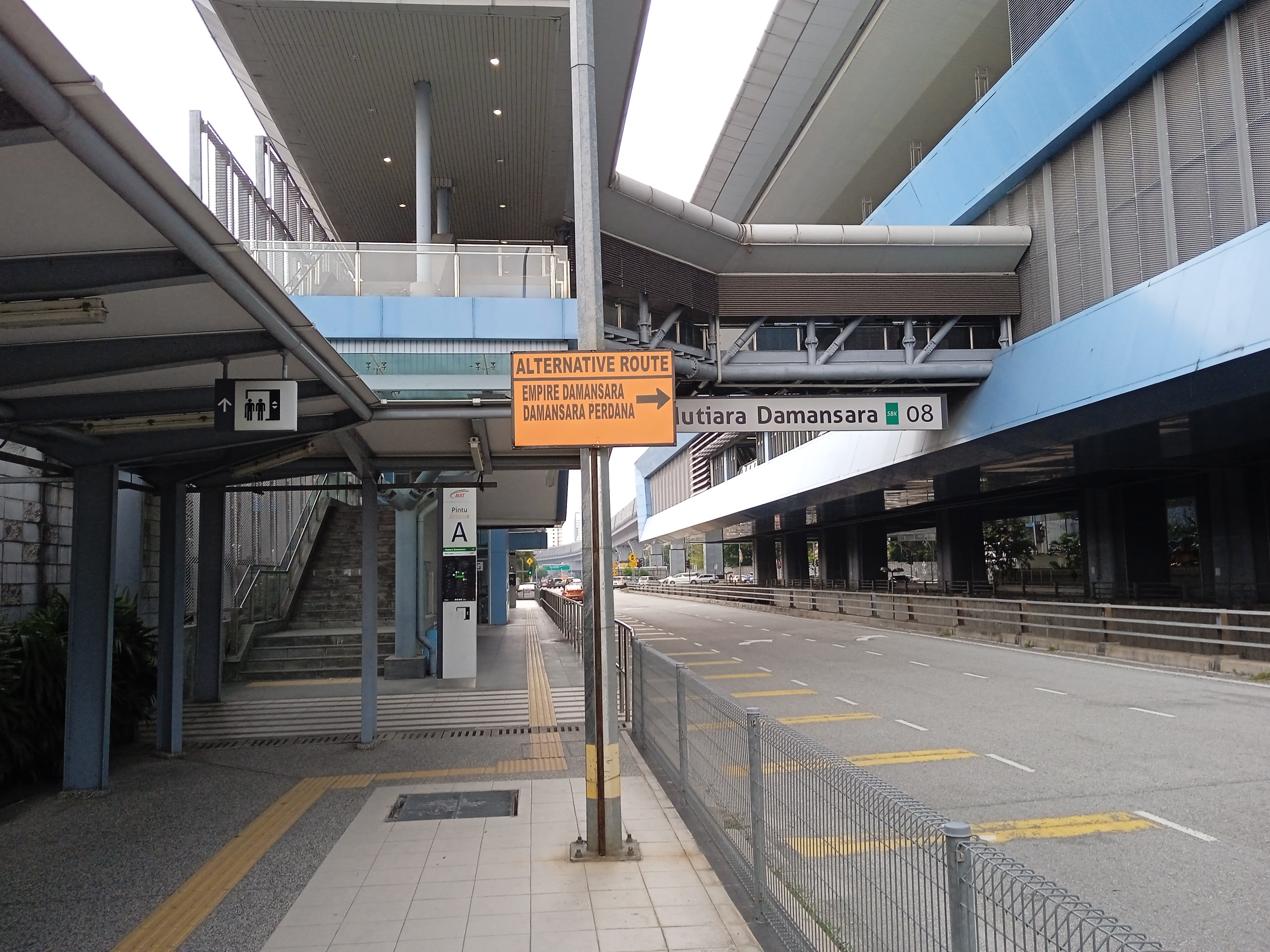
Entrance A along Persiaran Surian (Kota Damansara-bound)

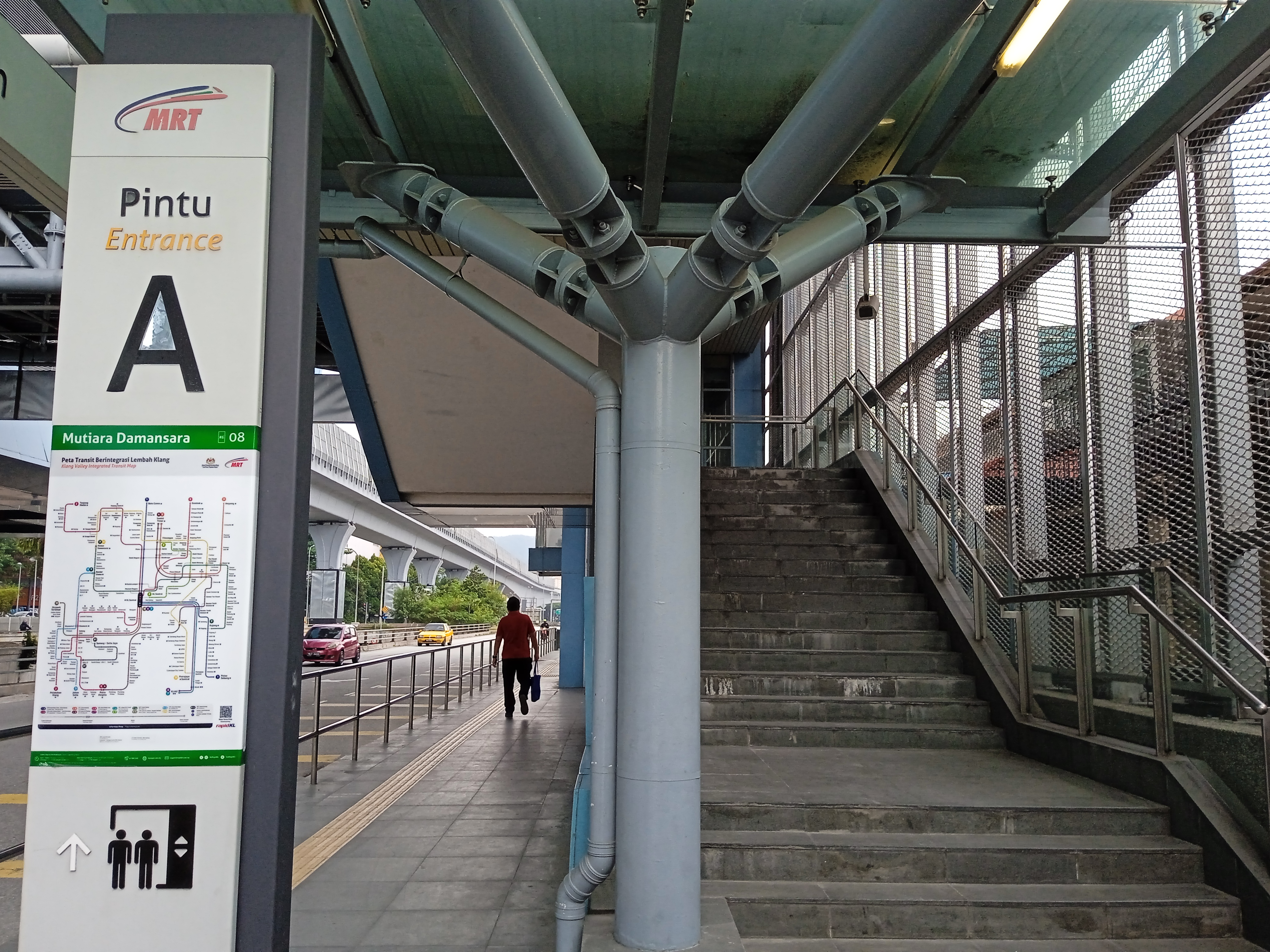
The stairs for Entrance A at Persiaran Surian (Kota Damansara-bound)

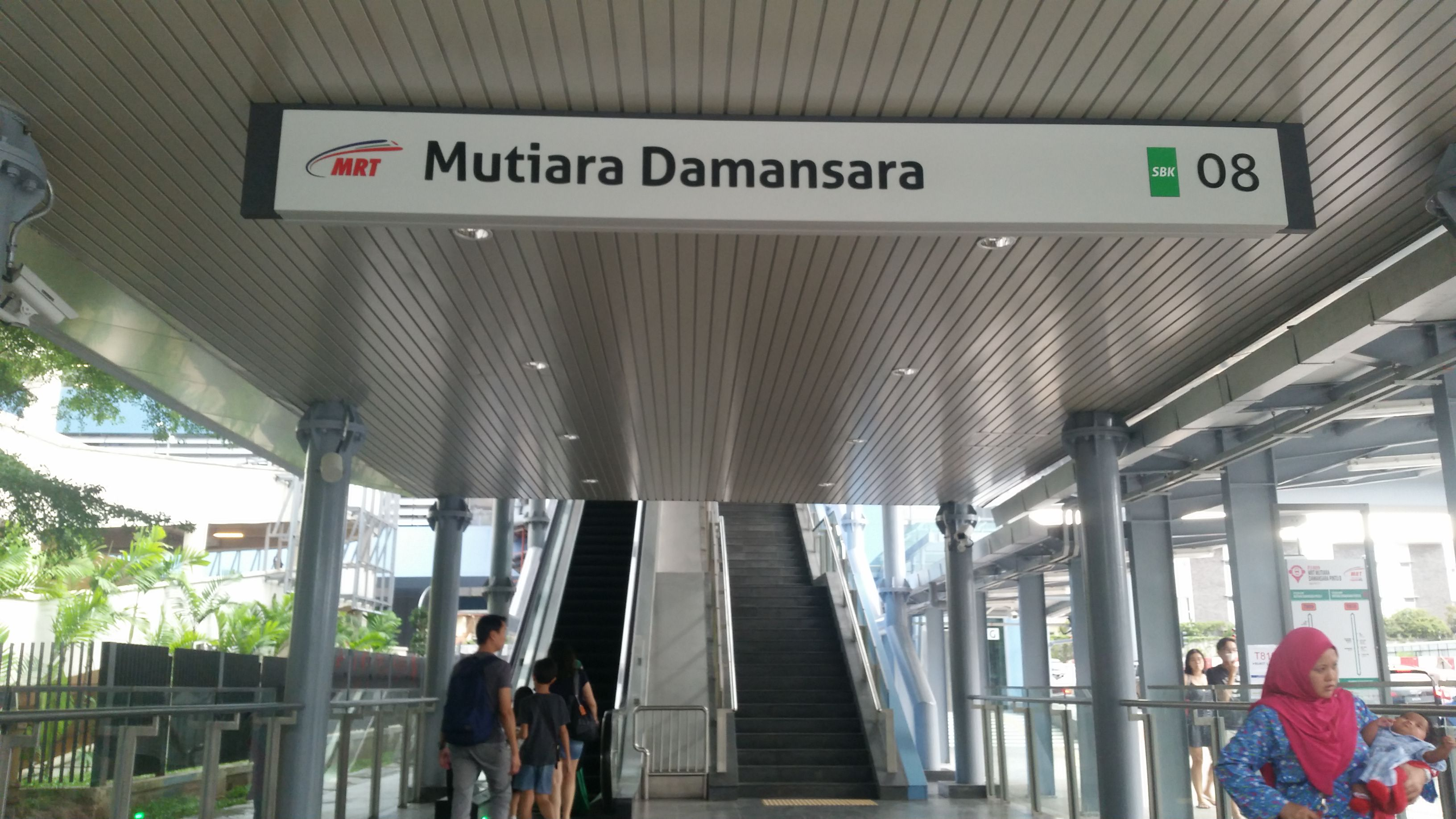
Entrance A to the Mutiara Damansara station

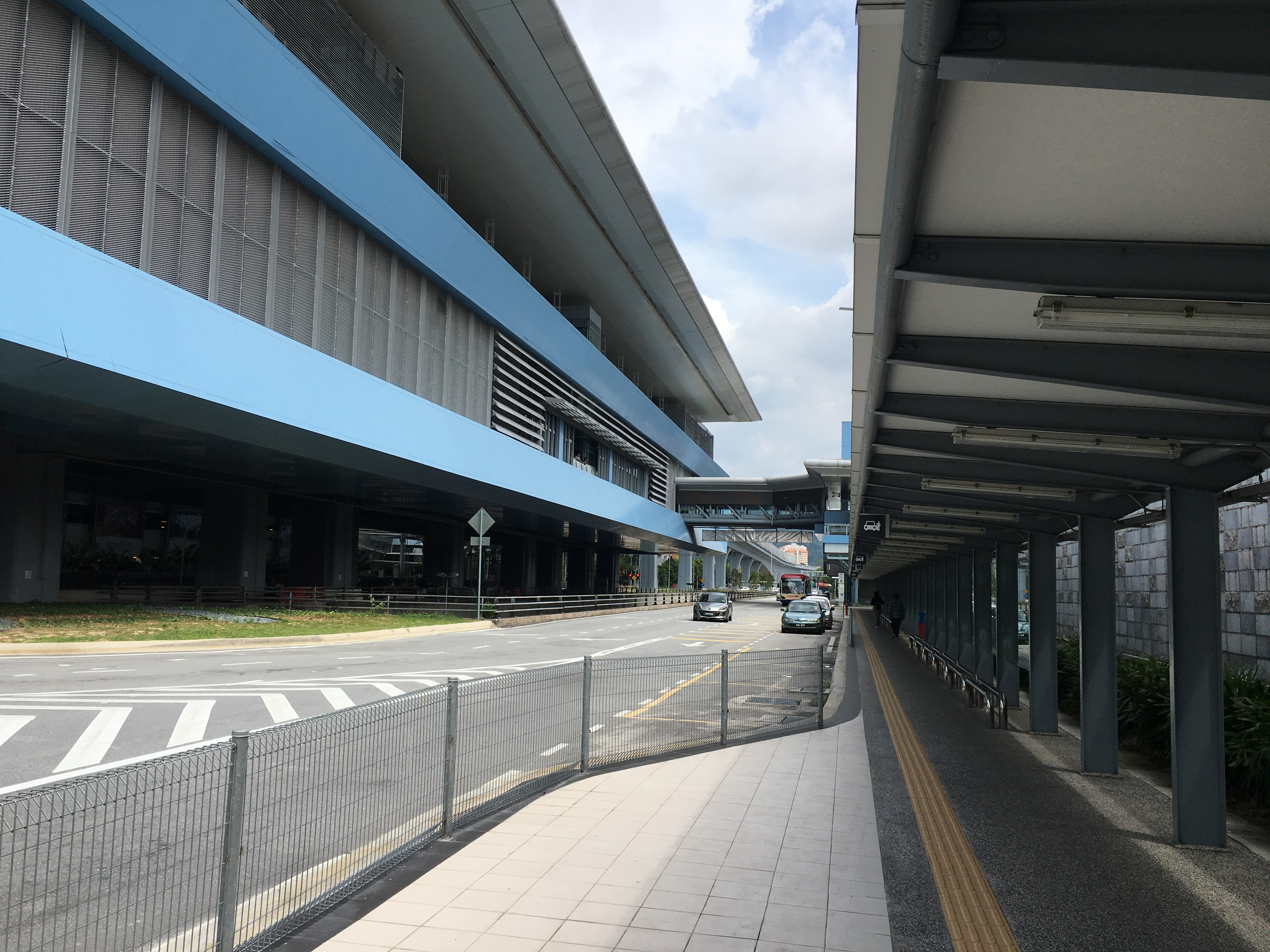
Covered walkway along Persiaran Surian towards Entrance A

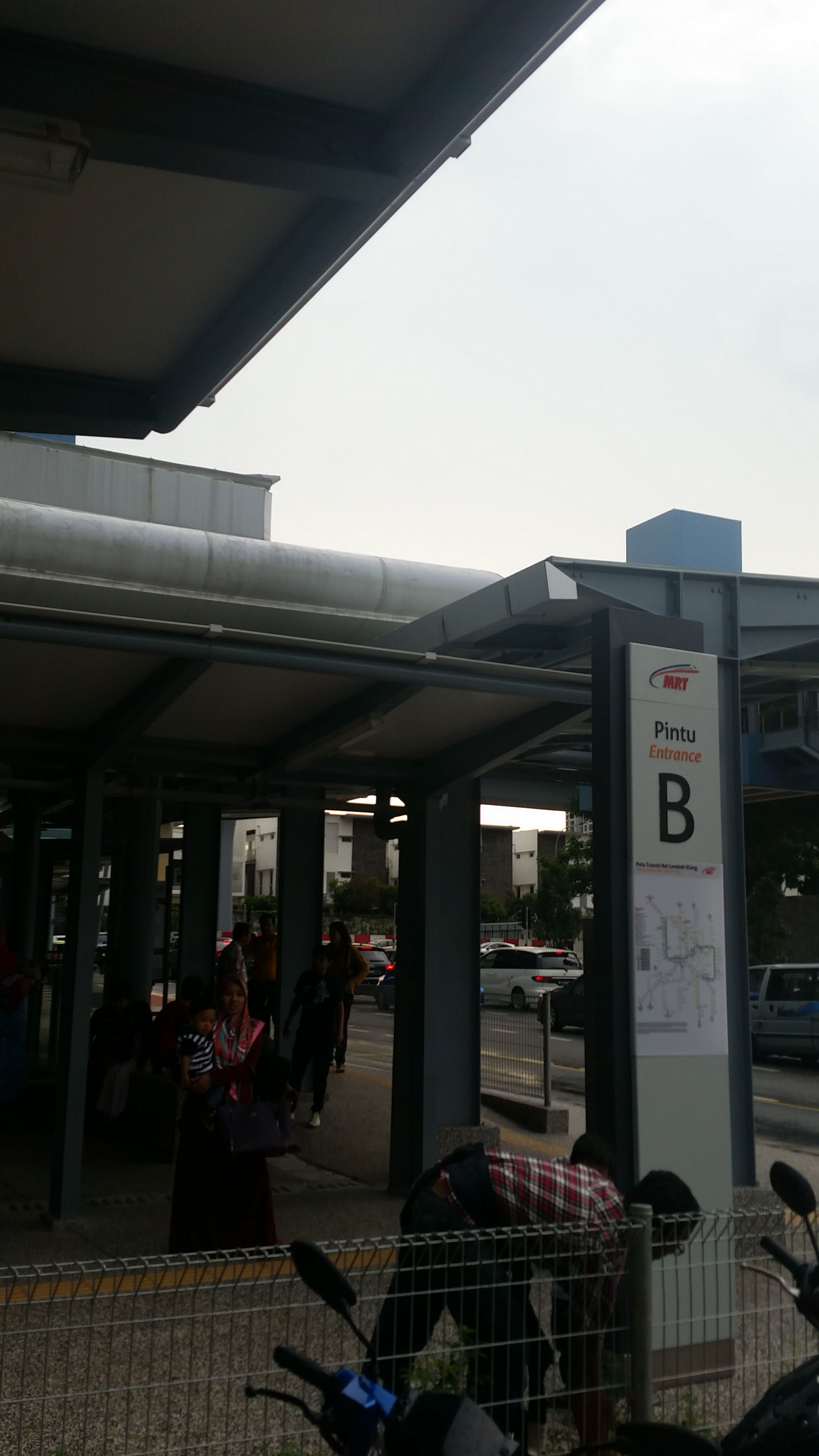
The signage of Entrance B at Mutiara Damansara MRT station

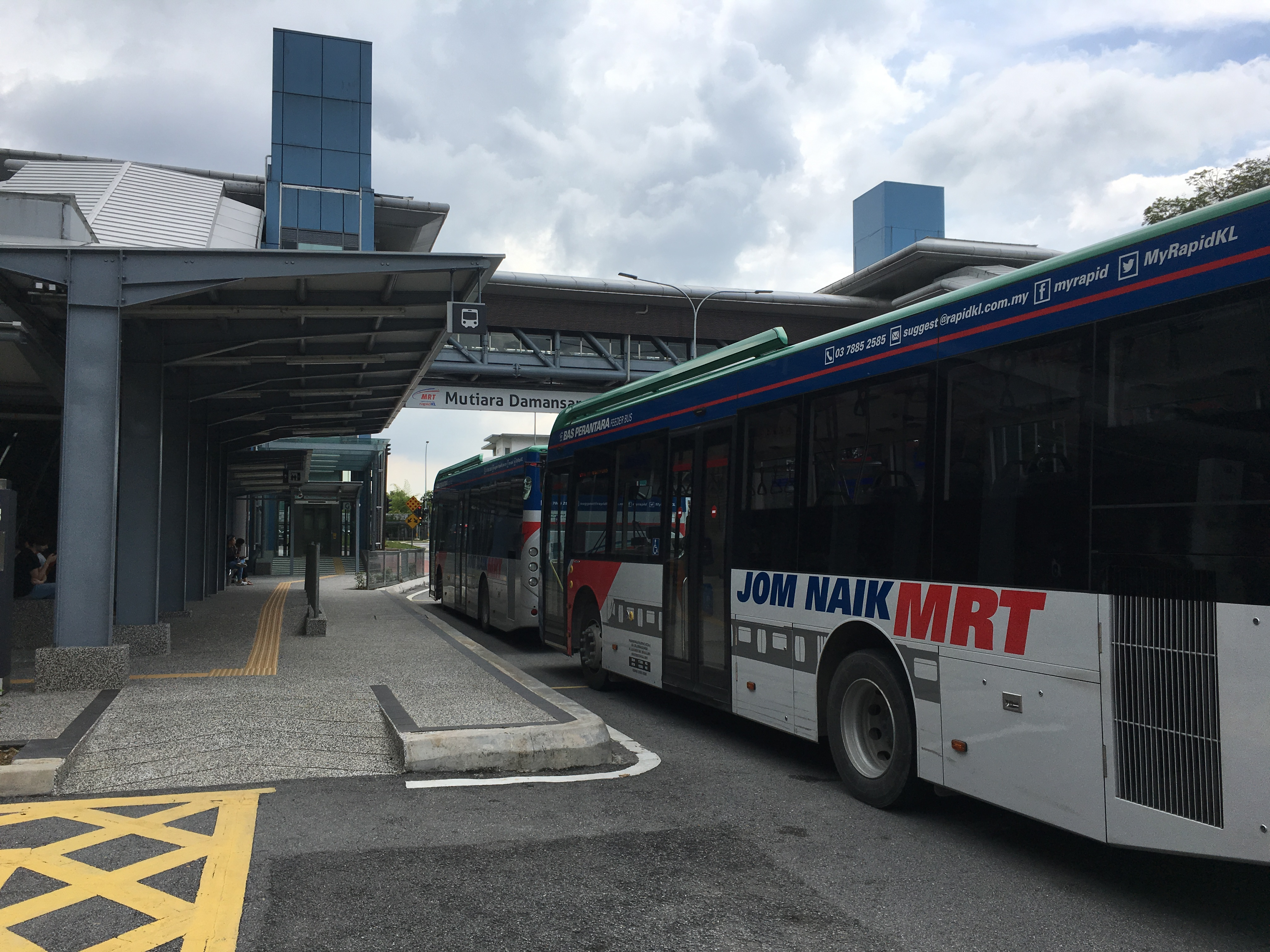
Feeder bus stop at Entrance B

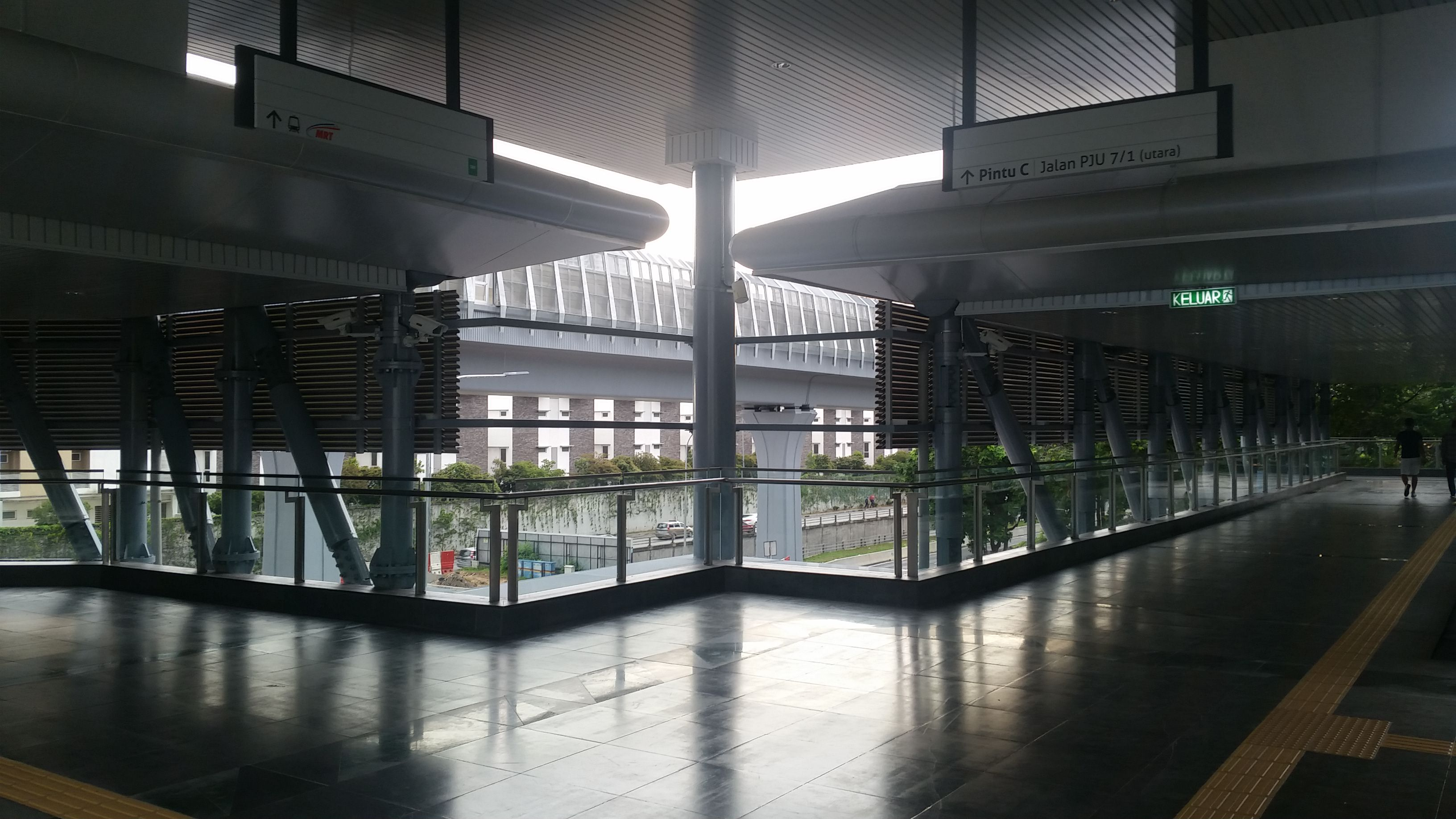
The left leads to the station, the right goes to the exit of Entrance B

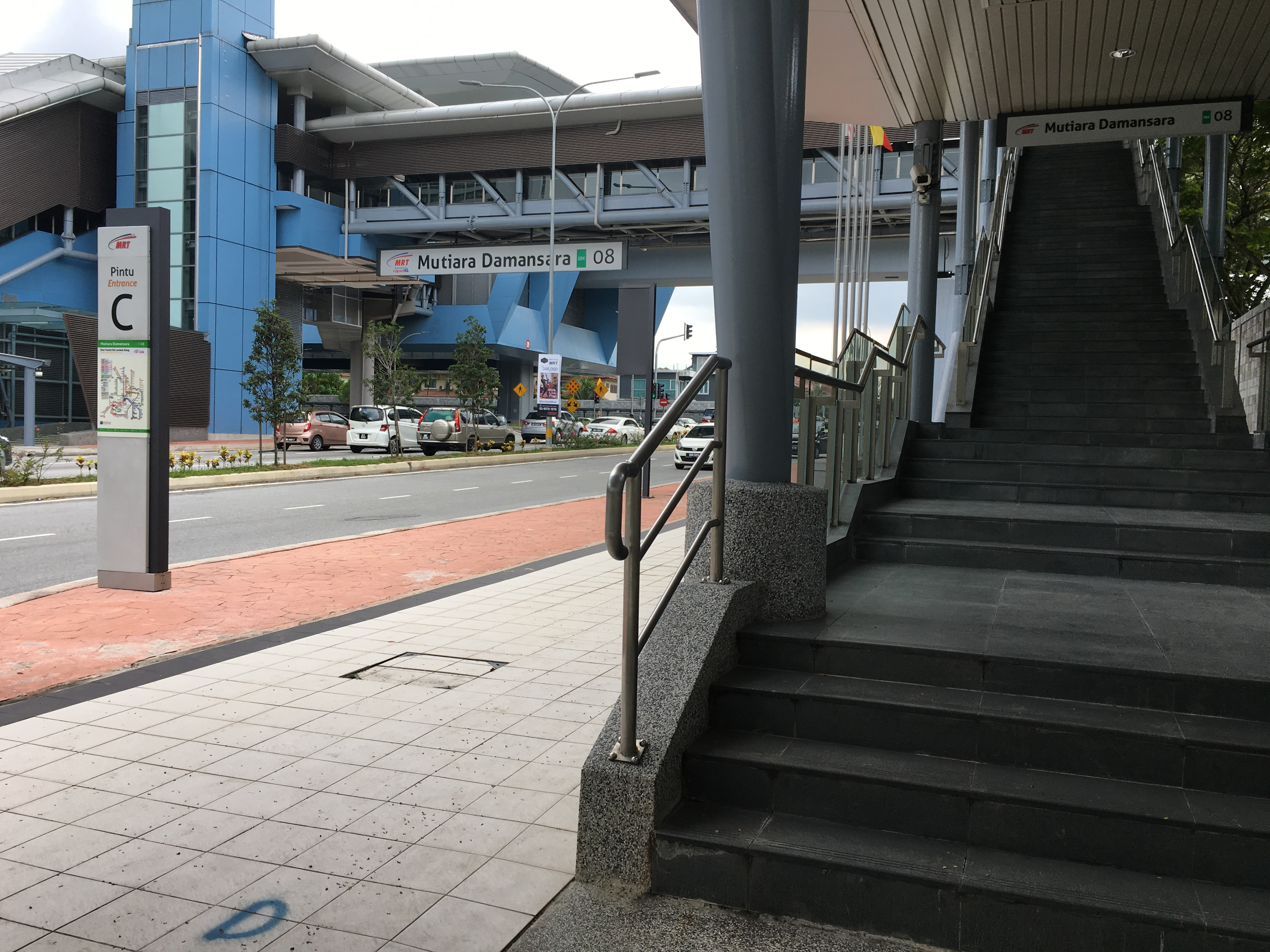
Entrance C on Jalan PJU 7/1

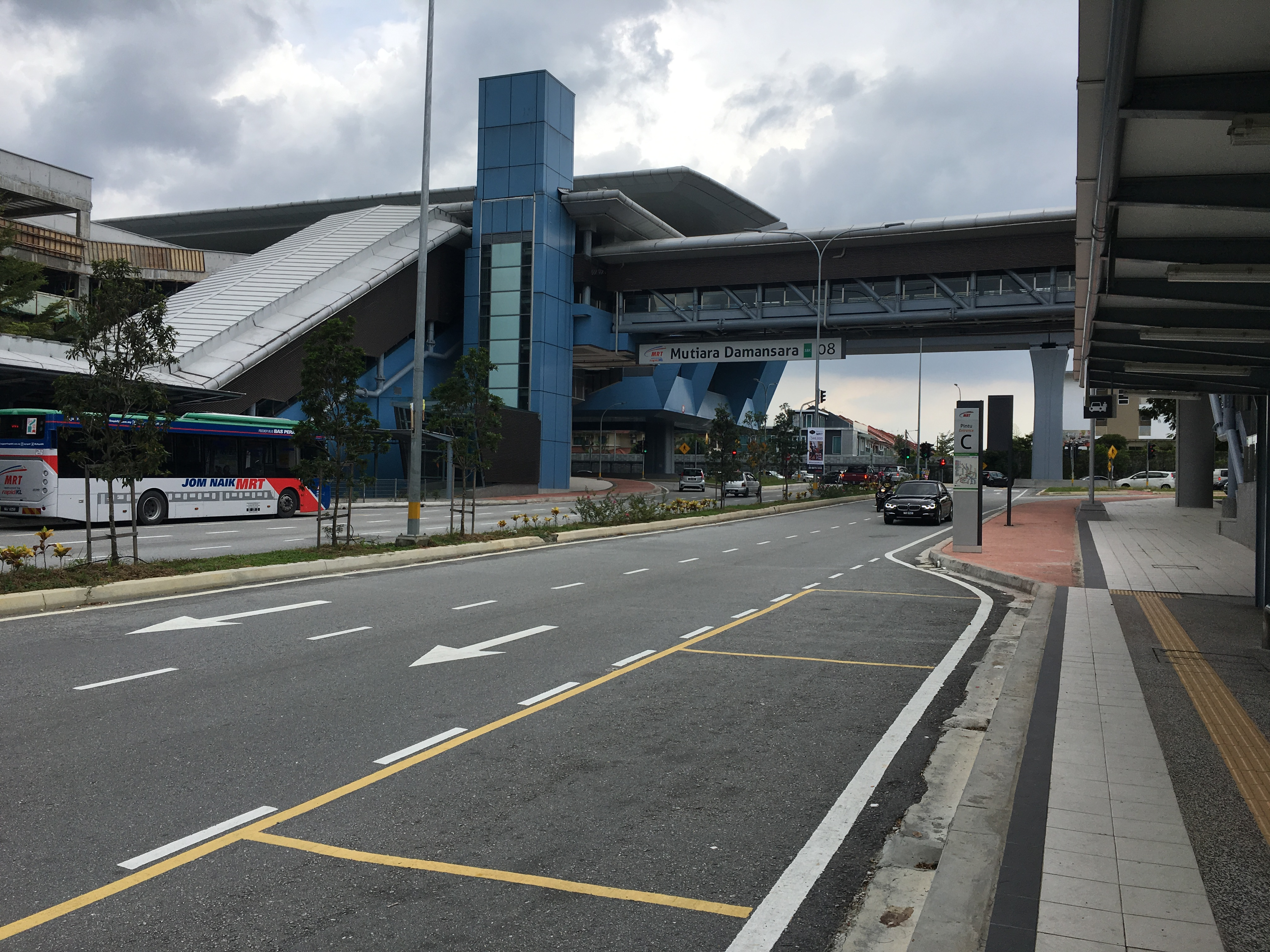
Entrance C and the pedestrian bridge over Jalan PJU 7/1 to the station

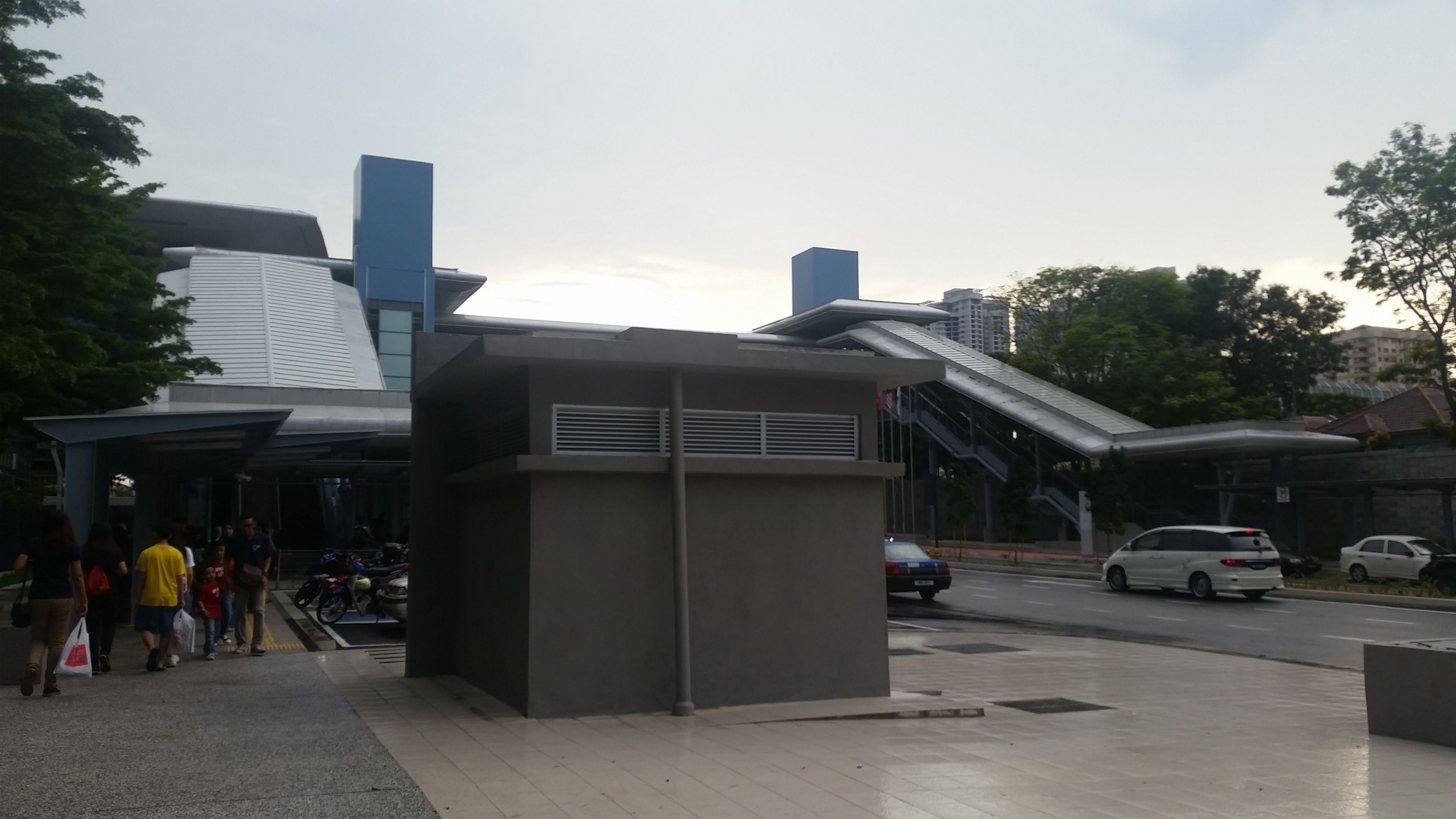
Entrance B and Entrance C at both sides of Jalan PJU 7/1

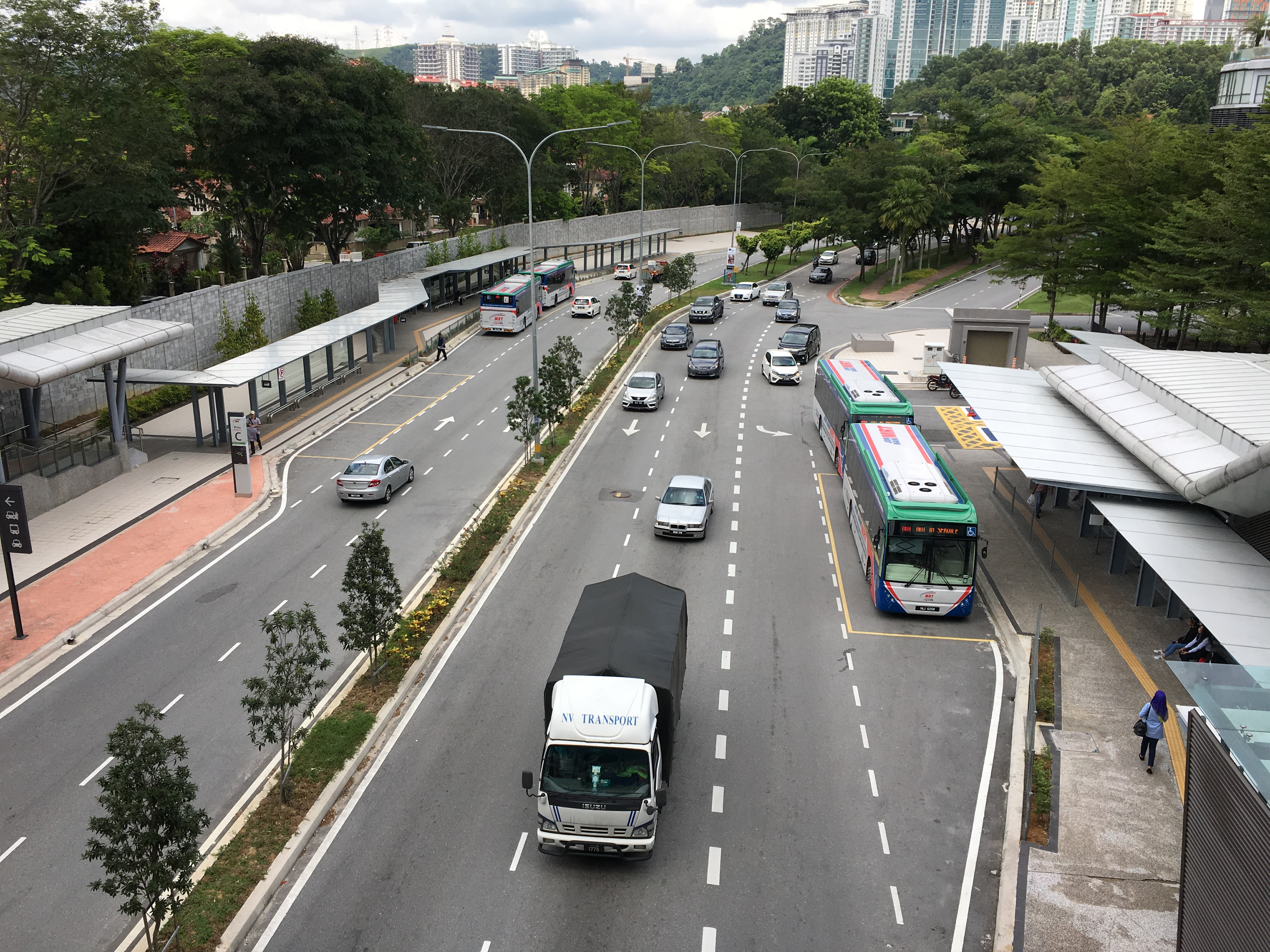
Feeder bus stops at Entrance B (right) and Entrance C

=== Pedestrian link to Surian Link ===
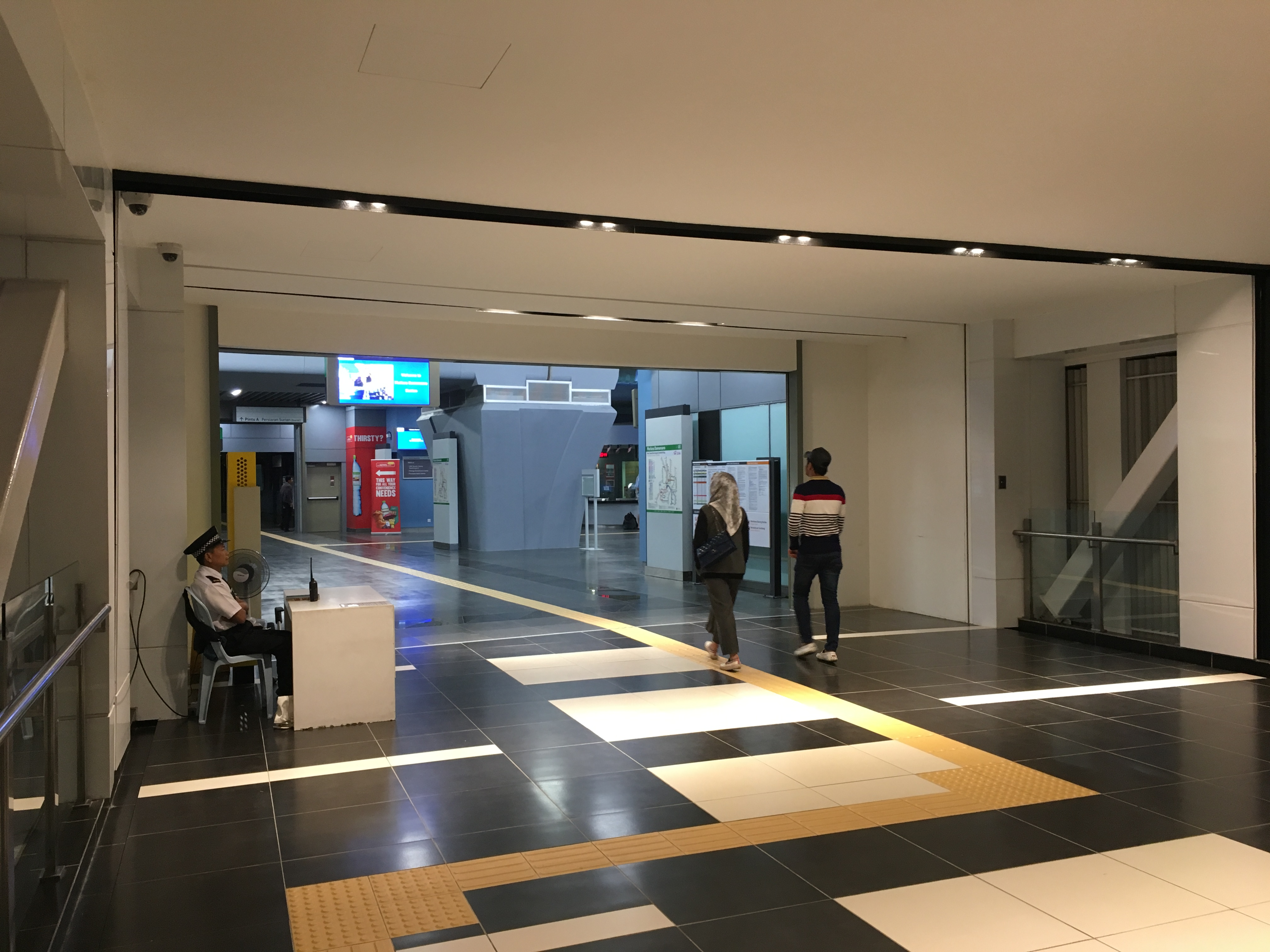
Entrance D of the station from the link bridge

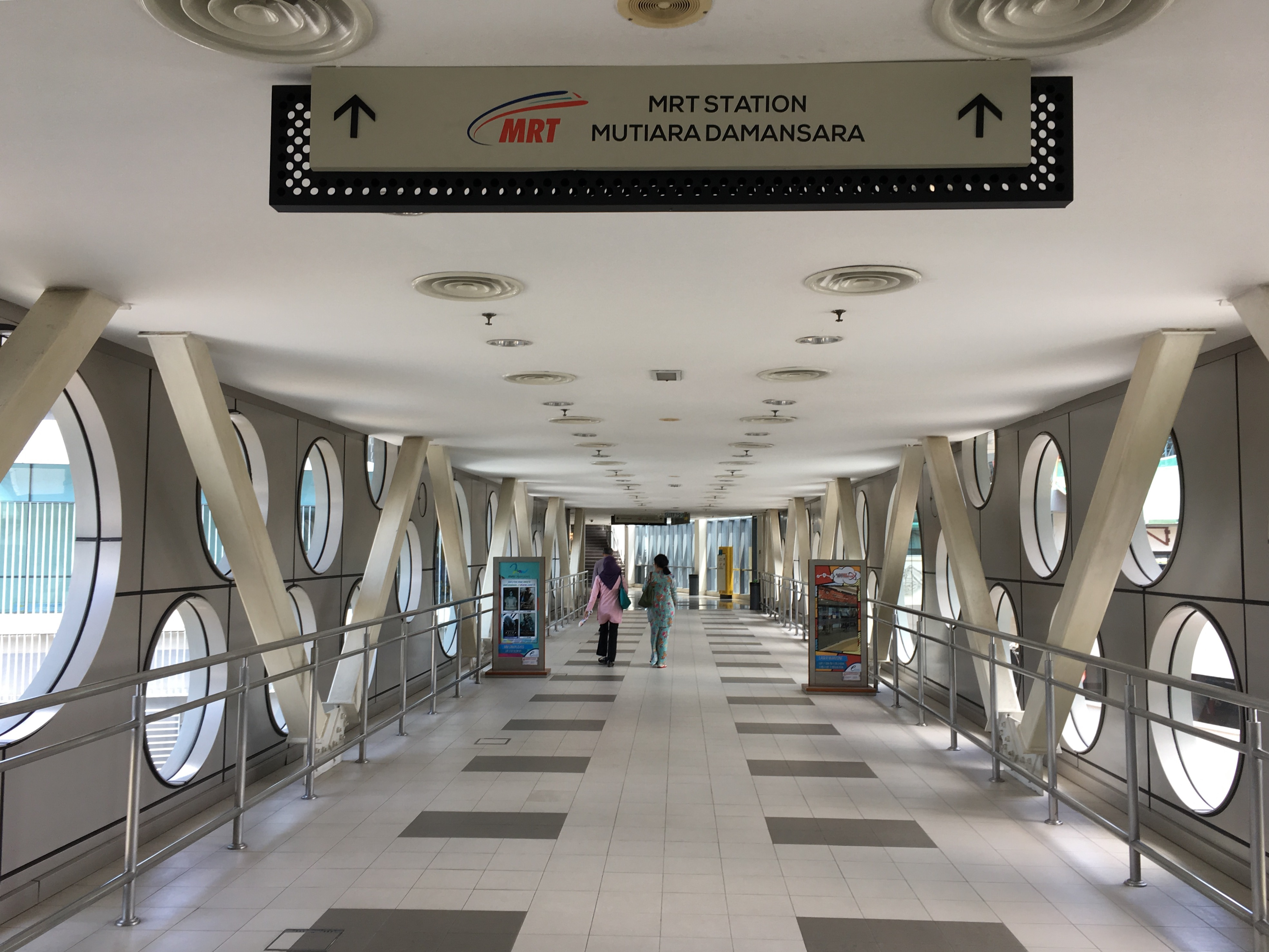
Link bridges connect buildings to the MRT station via the link bridge

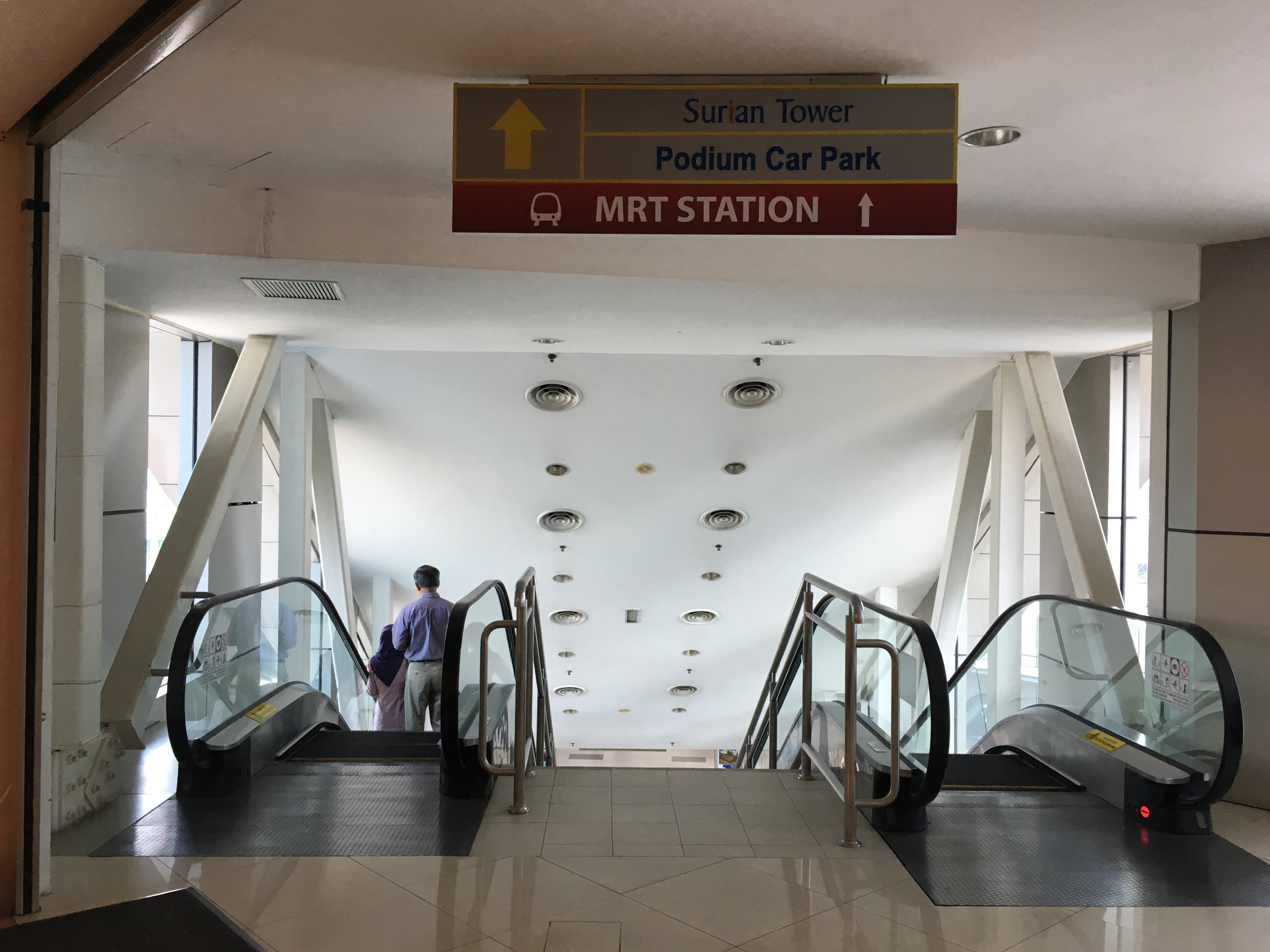
Good signage leading to the station from eCurve

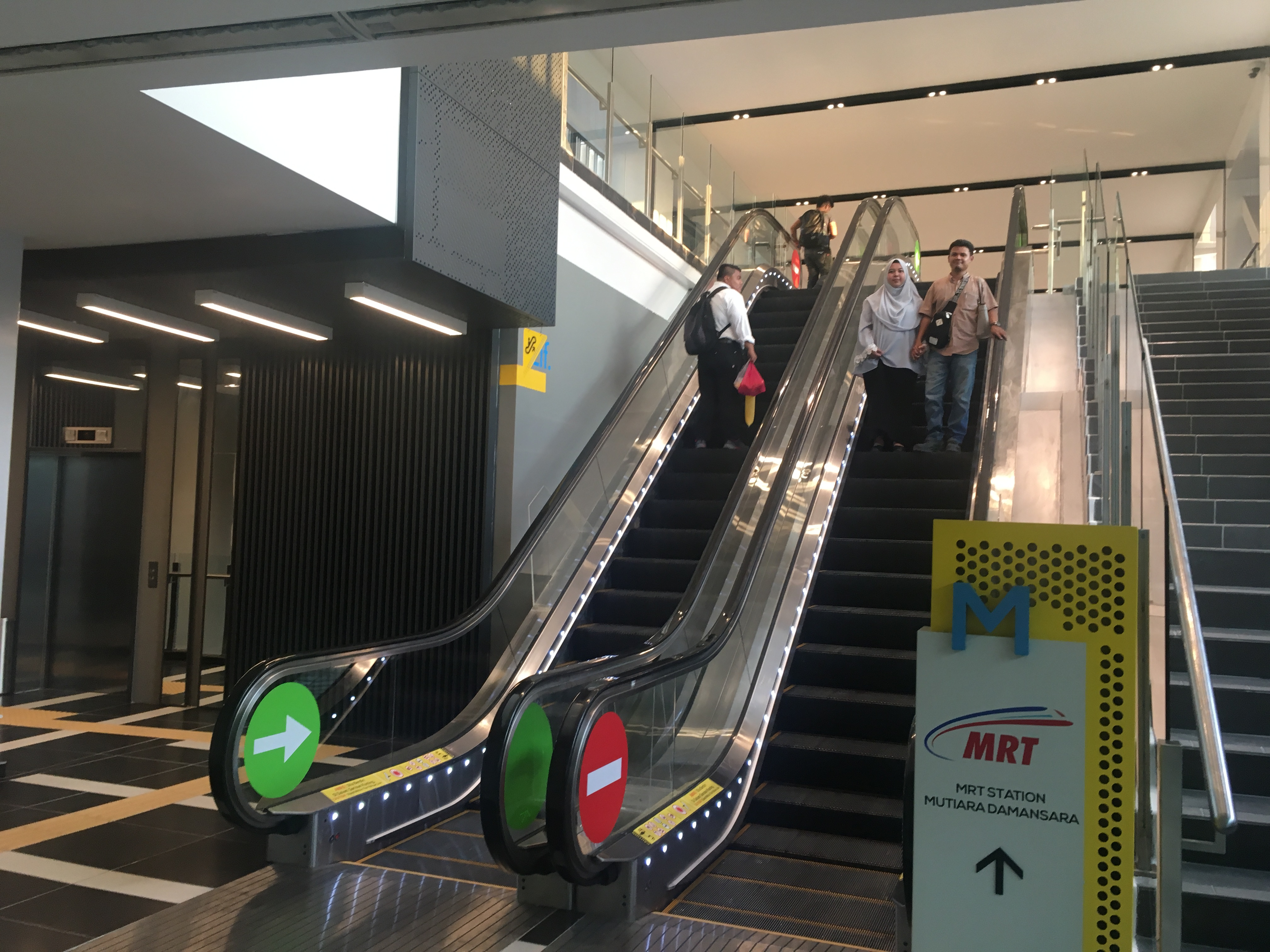
Escalators leading from Surian Link to the station

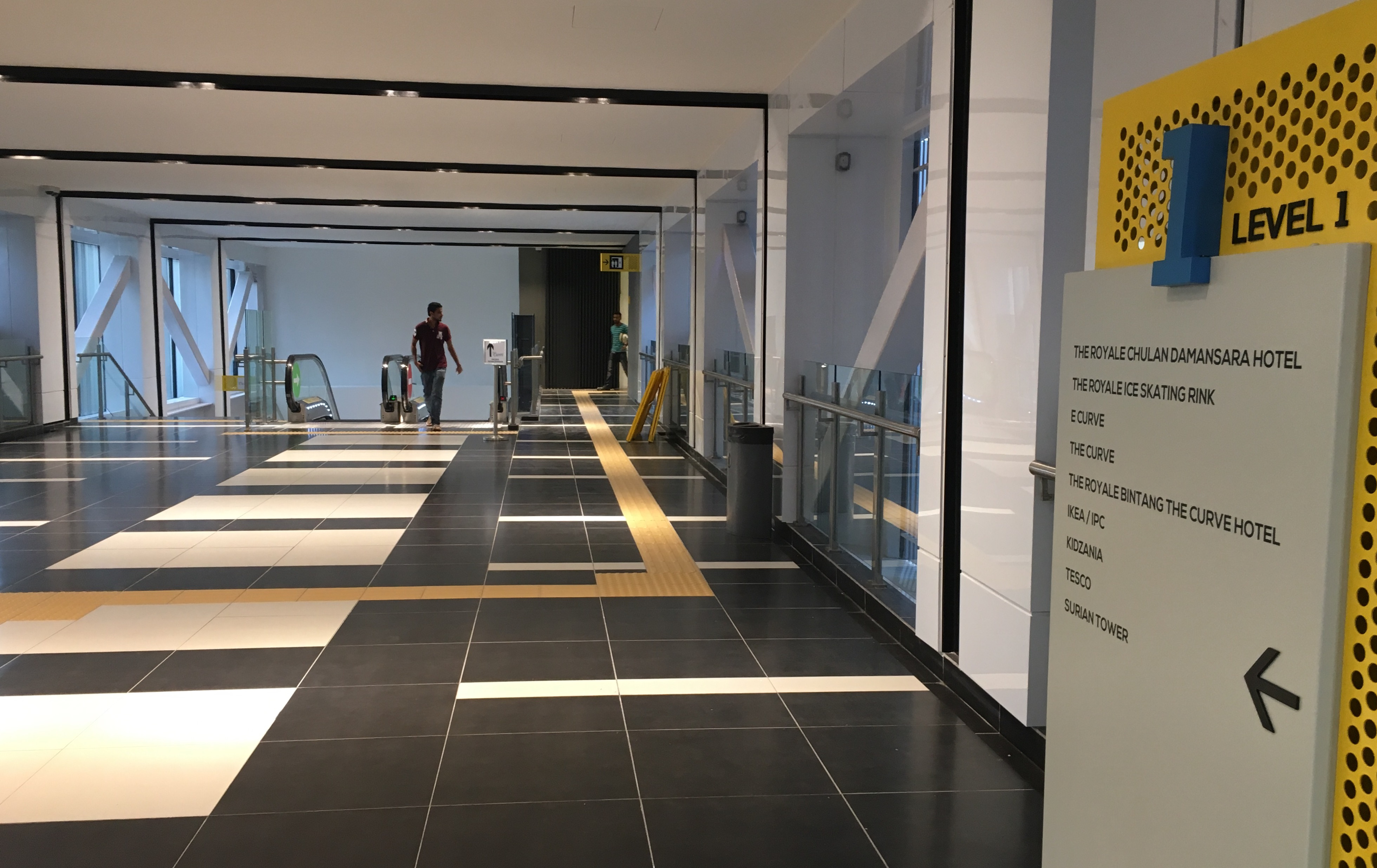
View of the Surian Tower-Mutiara Damansara MRT station link bridge from the MRT station exit

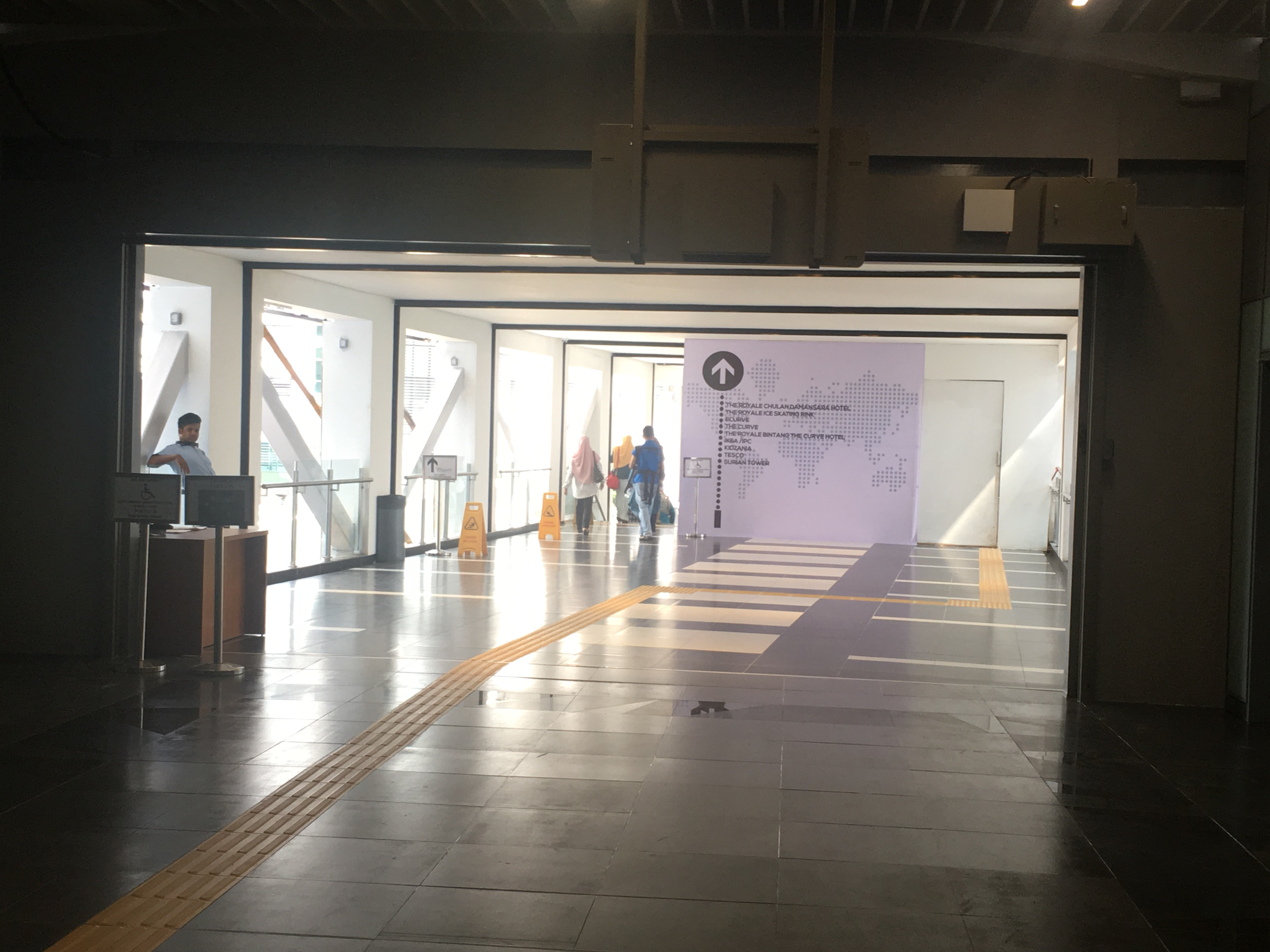
View of the same location in January 2017 when the escalators were still being installed

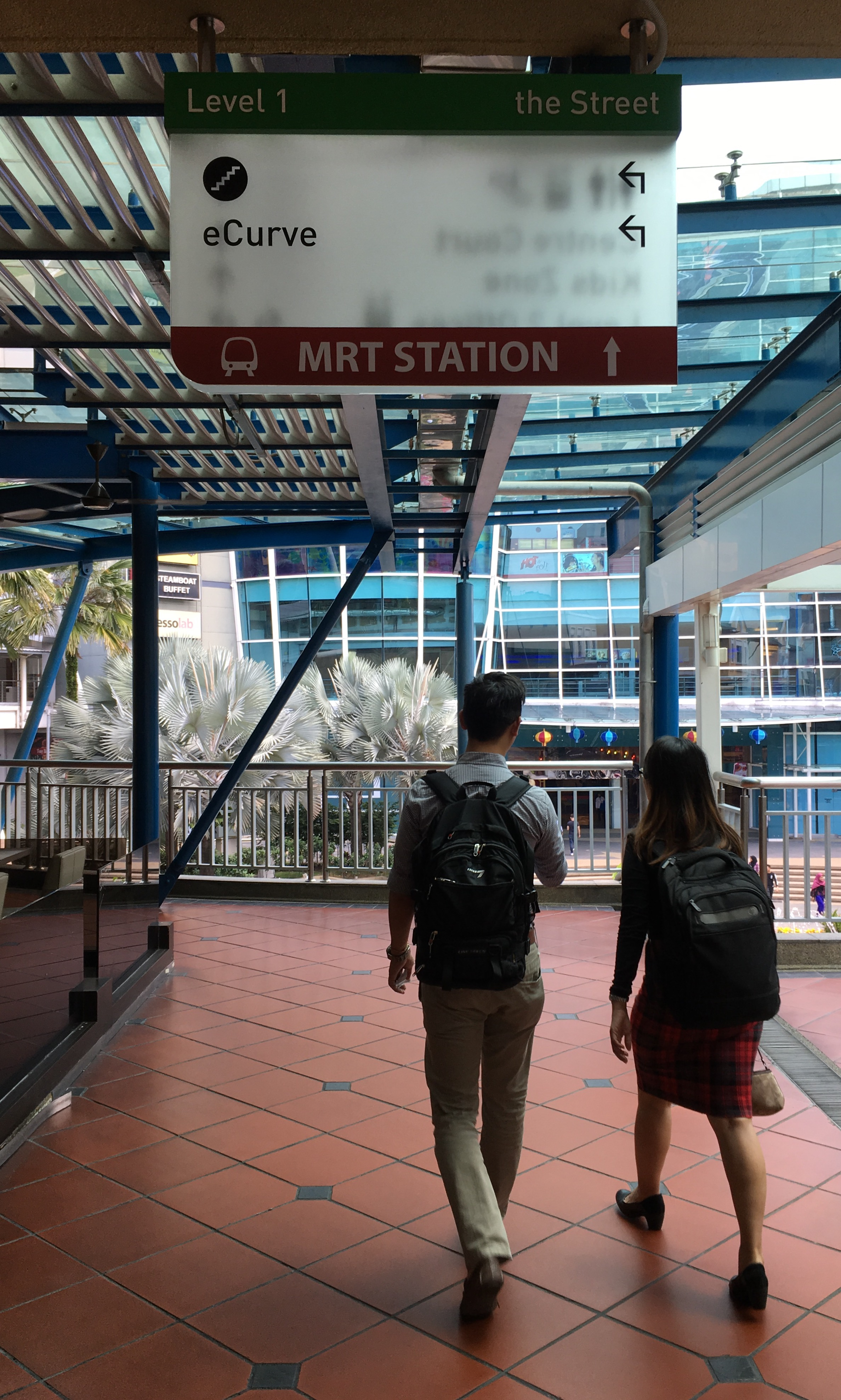
Good signage begins in The Curve leading people to the station via the link bridge

== See also ==
- Cochrane MRT station, on the same line, connected to another IKEA store
- MRT Kajang Line
- Mutiara Damansara
