= Addresses in Malaysia =

There may be different ways of writing addresses in Malaysia.

== Address format ==
The format in Malaysia generally follows this order:street number, street name, region, and town/city, state. The name of town or city is actually the name of the post office which is responsible for managing the incoming mail, not the municipal name (even though by writing the municipality, the address can still be understood, provided that the correct postcode is given).

For example, addresses in Simpang Pulai in Perak should be written as "Kampung Kepayang", even though Kampung Kepayang is now a ghost town. This is simply because the incoming mails are handled by the Kampung Kepayang post office which has moved to Simpang Pulai. However, there are also some people who write "Simpang Pulai", "Ipoh" (which is the nearest city and also the municipality) or even "Kinta" (the district or daerah in Malay").

Another example is the writing of addresses in Chemor, which is under the Ipoh City Council, yet their addresses are written as "Chemor" instead of "Ipoh". This is because they have their own post office to handle their incoming mails, which also covers Kuala Kuang, Kanthan, and Klebang.

One more example is the addresses of certain places e.g. Pandan Indah, Bukit Lanjan, Taman Melawati, etc. These belong to Selangor state, but their addresses are written as "Kuala Lumpur", because they fall under the Kuala Lumpur post office.

== See also ==
- Postal codes in Malaysia
