= Damansara River =

River in Selangor, Malaysia

Damansara River

The Damansara River (Malay: Sungai Damansara) is a river in Selangor state, Malaysia. It runs from Sungai Buloh until Shah Alam.

== See also ==
- List of rivers of Malaysia
