= Bukit Lanjan =

Coordinates: 3°11′N 101°36′E

Bukit Lanjan is a hill in Petaling District, Selangor, Malaysia. Bukit Lanjan is part of the Damansara parliamentary constituency.

The Bukit Lanjan state constituency includes Bandar Utama Damansara, Bandar Sri Damansara, Mutiara Damansara, Damansara Perdana and Kayu Ara. There are 25,550 registered voters in Bukit Lanjan, of whom 52.8% are Chinese, 31.8% Malays, 14.7% Indians and 0.7% others.

Bukit Lanjan has a population of about 50,000. Of the total number, 25% are in the lower-income group residing in Kampung Sungei Kayu Ara and the Pelangi Damansara low-cost flats. The upper-income group makes up about 35% of the population in areas like Bandar Utama, Mutiara Damansara, Damansara Perdana and Bandar Sri Damansara, while the remaining 40% are the middle-income group.

The most common complaints from the residents in the constituency are about infrastructure — the upgrading and maintenance of drains, roads and fields — and security matters such as car thefts and house break-ins. There is also constant traffic congestion leading to 1 Utama Shopping Centre and IKEA, and the roadside hawker issue at Bandar Sri Damansara.

There was an Orang Asli village on the hill previously, consisting mainly of the Temuan tribe. But today the village has been relocated to Desa Temuan, near Damansara Perdana. Their "Batin" (meaning leader in Temuan language) is named Kanau. Thirty percent of Temuan residents here are Muslim, 20 percent are Christian and 50 percent are animists, believing in the power of nature.
