= Damansara Perdana =

Township in Petaling Jaya, Malaysia

Coordinates: 3.1684285°N 101.6096856°E

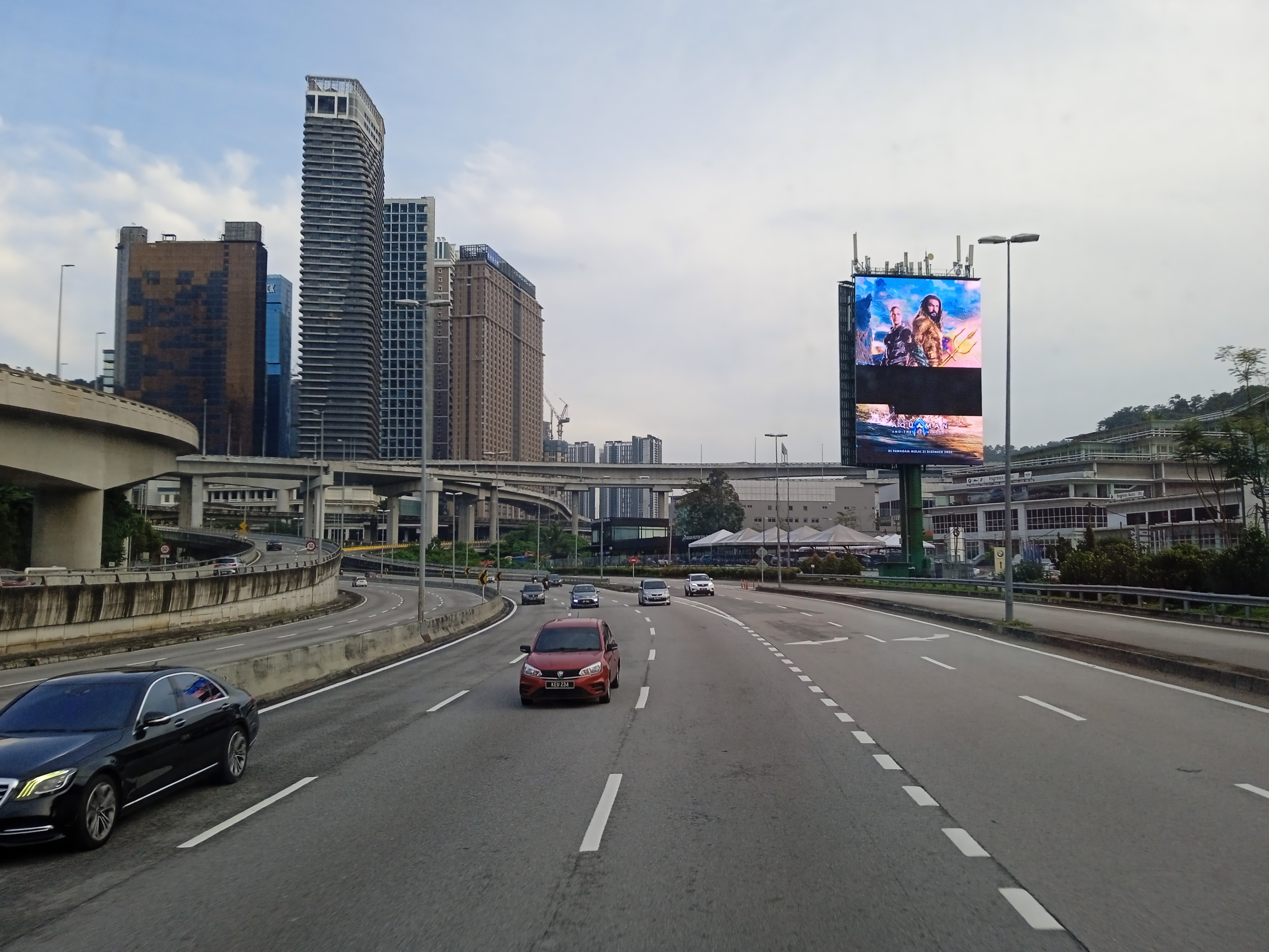
Damansara Perdana, 2023

Damansara Perdana is a major upscale township in the Mukim of Sungai Buloh, located within the city of Petaling Jaya, Selangor, Malaysia. It is a prominent component of the Golden Triangle of Petaling Jaya, which also encompasses Mutiara Damansara and Bandar Utama.

== History ==
Damansara Perdana was previously a village predominantly inhabited by Orang Asli, until developer MK Land Saujana Triangle Sdn Bhd bought most of it over and started developing it in 1996. Since that date, Damansara Perdana has become one of the best selling township in Petaling Jaya with total sales exceeding RM 1.9 billion.

The 750 acres (300 hectares) Damansara Perdana is located within the Golden Triangle of Petaling Jaya, which also consists of Bandar Utama and Mutiara Damansara. It is accessible via the Damansara–Puchong Expressway, SPRINT Highway (Penchala Link), Persiaran Surian, and NKVE.

Most recently, Mammoth Empire Land Sdn. Bhd. developed a joint development project with MKLAND Holdings Bhd. to develop the Empire Damansara project, which consists of Empire City and Empire Residence. Another developer, Tujuan Gemilang Sdn. Bhd., also developed a few projects in Damansara Perdana, namely the PJ Trade Centre and Point 92.

Completion dates for the projects in Damansara Perdana

- Perdana The Place – 2000
- Perdana Trade Centre – 2000
- Perdana Emerald Condominium – Block 1 & 2: 2002; Block 3: 2005
- Perdana View Boutique Serviced Residence – August 2004
- Flora Damansara – Initial Phases (Block A & B): 2005; Later Phases/Full Completion: January 2015
- Perdana Exclusive Condominium – January 2005
- Ritze Perdana 1 – November 2006
- Ritze Perdana 2 – early 2010
- Metropolitan Square (MSQ) – Phase 1 (Early Blocks): January 2007; Final Phase (Block B & Commercial): July 2013 (est.)
- Armanee Terrace I – 2008
- Armanee Terrace II – 2010
- PJ Trade Centre (PJTC) – February 2009
- The Rafflesia – 2011
- Rafflesia @ The Hill – 2021-2022
- Rafflesia @ Hill 3 – Q3 2025 (est.)
- Empire Residence – 2012-2014
- Neo Damansara – Late 2012
- Menara OBYU (formerly known as Point 92) – 2012
- Empire Damansara – December 2013
- Damansara Performing Arts Centre (DPAC) – 2013
- D Theatre Malaysia - 2026
- ForestHill Residences – Q1 2027
- Hextar World at Empire City – 2025
- Hampton Damansara – December 2023
- Malaysia National Ice Skating Stadium (MYNISS) – 2017
- Central Park Damansara – 2030 (est.)
- D'Quince Residences – June 2024
- D'Vervain Residences – Early 2024
- D'Cosmos Residences – Early 2024
- D'Vine Residences – 2026 (est.)
- D'Erica Residences – Late 2024
- D'Clover Residences – Late 2026
- D'Terra Residences – May 2026 (est.)
- D'Tessera Residences – Q3 2026
- The Aldenz – Early 2029
- Hill Park – 2028
- Sanctuary Park – Late 2026 to 2027
- Alfresco Retail Park – mid-2028
- Damansara Specialist Hospital 2 (DSH2) – May 2023
- Damansara Perdana Mosque – 2023

== Location ==
Damansara Perdana is part of the Golden Triangle of Petaling Jaya, situated in the Klang Valley, at Selangor, Malaysia. As one of the biggest developments in Petaling Jaya, this township is serviced by the Damansara–Puchong Expressway (LDP), the New Klang Valley Expressway (NKVE), the Sprint Expressway (Penchala Link) and Damansara–Shah Alam Elevated Expressway (DASH). With the opening of the 24 million ringgit direct-connection to the SPRINT highway (Penchala Link), traveling to Kuala Lumpur City Centre takes about 7 minutes to reach Jalan Tuanku Abdul Halim (Jalan Duta). It is also 5 minutes to Mont' Kiara via the SPRINT highway (Penchala Link).

Damansara Perdana is surrounded by major affluent townships within 10 km radius such as Mutiara Damansara, Bandar Sri Damansara, Taman Tun Dr. Ismail, Bandar Utama, Damansara Utama and Damansara Jaya.

=== Bus services ===
Several bus services are also serving this area.

- 801 : Bandar Utama - Damansara Perdana - Bandar Sri Damansara - Metro Prima MRT
- T809 : Mutiara Damansara MRT - Mutiara Damansara - Damansara Perdana - Bandar Utama
- PJ06 : Bandar Utama - Damansara Perdana - Bandar Sri Damansara - Damansara Damai
