= List of Petaling Jaya city sections =

Petaling Jaya city sections

Petaling Jaya is divided into several sections. Some sections themselves are subdivided into smaller neighbourhoods (kejiranan), for example SS5D. Some sections have their own names (SS1 is Kampung Tunku), while other sections are grouped together (SS4, SS5, SS6, and SS7 are part of Kelana Jaya).

== Addressing format ==
These sections names are used in the addressing format for locations in Petaling Jaya.

No. 15, Jalan SS20/6,
SS20,
47300 Petaling Jaya,
Selangor

This system would point to house number xx, 5th street, SS20, Petaling Jaya. This would remove the need to have an additional address line for the housing estate name (in this example, Taman Subang) like most addresses used for the rest of the country.

The city sections are numbered as such that the older sections have no prefixes to their section number (Section 1, Section 9) while later sections have prefixes such as SS (Sungei Way-Subang), PJS (Petaling Jaya Selatan) and PJU (Petaling Jaya Utara).

== List of Petaling Jaya city sections and postal codes ==
=== Section 1-5, 51, 51A, 52, 6-14, 16, 17, 17A, and 18-22 ===
Sections	Other Names	Postal Code
Seksyen 1	Old Town	46000
Seksyen 1A	Old Town	46000
Seksyen 2	Old Town	46000
Seksyen 3	Old Town	46000
Seksyen 4	Old Town	46050
Seksyen 5	Bukit Gasing	46000
Seksyen 51		46050
Seksyen 51A	Asia Jaya	46100
Seksyen 52	New Town	46200
Seksyen 6		46000
Seksyen 7		46000
Seksyen 8		46050
Seksyen 9	Taman Jaya	46000
Seksyen 10		46000
Seksyen 11		46200
Seksyen 12	PPUM	46200
Seksyen 13	Centerstage	46200
Seksyen 14	Masjid Bulat	46100
Seksyen 16	KK13, UM	46350
Seksyen 17	International House UM	46400
Seksyen 17A		46400
Seksyen 18		46000
Seksyen 19	Taman Gee Huat	46300
Seksyen 20	Taman Paramount	46300
Seksyen 21	SEA Park	46300
Seksyen 22		46300

=== SS1-SS9, SS9A, SS10, SS11, SS20-SS22, SS22A, SS23-SS26 ===
Sections	Other Names	Postal Code
SS1	Kampung Tunku	47300
SS2		47300
SS3	Taman Subang, Taman Universiti & Seaport	47300
SS4	Kelana Jaya	47301
SS5	Kelana Jaya	47301
SS6	Kelana Jaya	47301
SS7	Kelana Jaya	47301
SS8	Sungei Way	47300
SS9	Sungei Way	47300
SS9A	Sungei Way	47300
SS10		47300
SS11	Kelab Golf Negara Subang	47301
SS20	Damansara Kim, Damansara Utama	47400
SS21	Damansara Utama	47400
SS22	Damansara Jaya	47400
SS22A	Damansara Jaya	47400
SS23	Taman SEA	47400
SS24	Taman Megah	47301
SS25	Taman Mayang	47301
SS26	Taman Mayang Jaya	47301

Note: The missing neighbourhood between SS11 and SS20 (SS12 until SS19), are within Subang Jaya which is under the jurisdiction of the Subang Jaya City Council.

=== PJU1, PJU1A, PJU2-PJU10 ===
Sections	Other Names	Postal Code
PJU1	Dataran Prima, Aman Suria & Kampung Chempaka	47301
PJU1A	Ara Damansara	47301
PJU2	Taman Perindustrian Jaya	47301
PJU3	Tropicana, Damansara Indah & Sunway Damansara	47410
PJU4	Kwasa Damansara	47410
PJU5	Kota Damansara	47810
PJU6	Bandar Utama (BU1-BU12) & Kampung Sungai Kayu Ara	47800
PJU7	Mutiara Damansara	47810
PJU8	Damansara Perdana	47820
PJU9*	Bandar Sri Damansara	52200
PJU10	Damansara Damai	47830

(*) Note: PJU9 (Bandar Sri Damansara) the only section/township in Petaling Jaya using the same postcode of Kuala Lumpur.

=== PJS1-PJS6, PJS7, PJS8, PJS10 ===
Sections	Other Names	Postal Code
PJS1	Petaling Utama	46000
PJS2	Kampung Medan & Taman Dato' Harun	46000
PJS3	Taman Medan & Taman Sri Manja	46000
PJS4	Taman Medan	46000
PJS5	Taman Desaria	46150
PJS6	Kampung Lindungan	46150
PJS7*	Bandar Sunway (Southern)	47500
PJS8	Bandar Sunway	46150
PJS10	Bandar Sunway (Northern)	46150

(*) Note: Only a small portion eastern part of PJS7 is under the jurisdiction of the Petaling Jaya City Council. The remaining part of PJS7 together with PJS9 and PJS11 (Southern part of Bandar Sunway township) are within Subang Jaya, under the jurisdiction of the Subang Jaya City Council.
