= Bandar Sri Damansara =

Bandar Sri Damansara PJU9
- Township
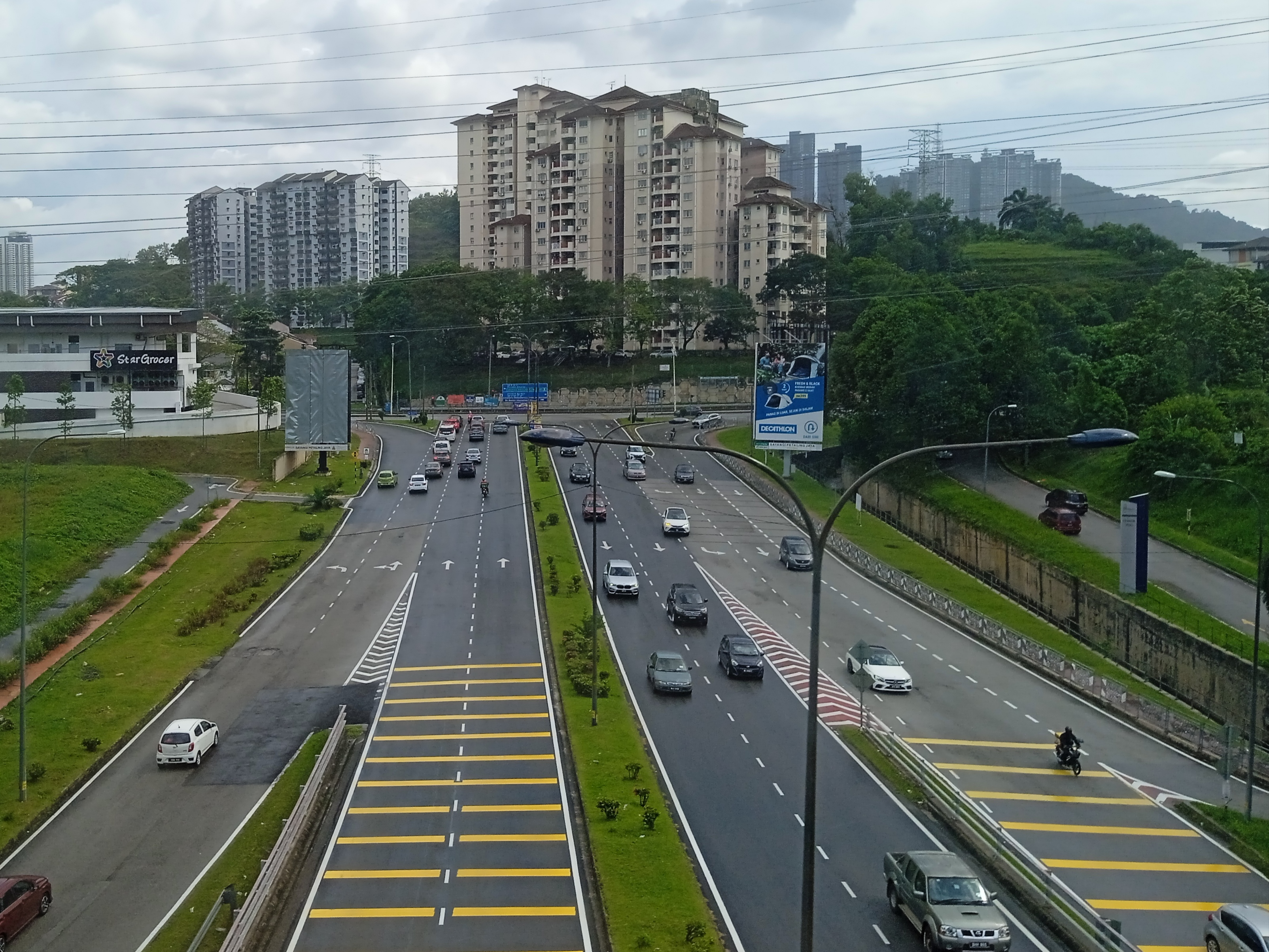
- Persiaran Perdana, Bandar Sri Damansara

- Bandar Sri Damansara in Petaling District

- Location in Selangor
- Coordinates: 3°11′N 101°36′E
- Country: Malaysia
- State: Selangor
- Constituency: Petaling District
- Establishment: 1996

Government
  - City council: Petaling Jaya City Council (MBPJ)

Area
  - Total: 5.49 km^{2} (2.12 sq mi)
- Time zone: UTC+8 (MST)
  - Summer (DST): Not observed
- Postcode: 52200

Bandar Sri Damansara is a residential township in Petaling District, Selangor, Malaysia. The township is divided into two sections, SD1-SD5 in the north and SD7-SD15 in the south which are separated by Kuala Selangor-Kepong Highway (Malaysia Federal Route 54). It is adjacent to Kepong and Sungai Buloh. The township consists of mixed development of commercial and residential properties. It was previously developed by Land and General Berhad in the 1900s and currently by TA Global.

== Location ==
Bandar Sri Damansara is a freehold residential and commercial zone located in the Klang Valley, with a district code of Petaling Jaya Utara 9 (PJU 9). It is located in the Selangor federal constituency of Damansara (P.106). However, it is not in the mukim of Damansara, but rather in the mukim of Sungai Buloh instead.

The township is located just north of Damansara Perdana (PJU 8), and east of Damansara Damai (PJU 10), and is within proximity to other townships such as Kepong, Kota Damansara (PJU 5), Bandar Utama (PJU 6), Mutiara Damansara (PJU 7), Bandar Menjalara, Sierramas and Valencia.

It is situated opposite Desa ParkCity and Sunway SPK Damansara. Although situated in Petaling Jaya which is in Selangor, it uses a Kuala Lumpur postcode of 52200.

== Accessibility ==
=== Car ===
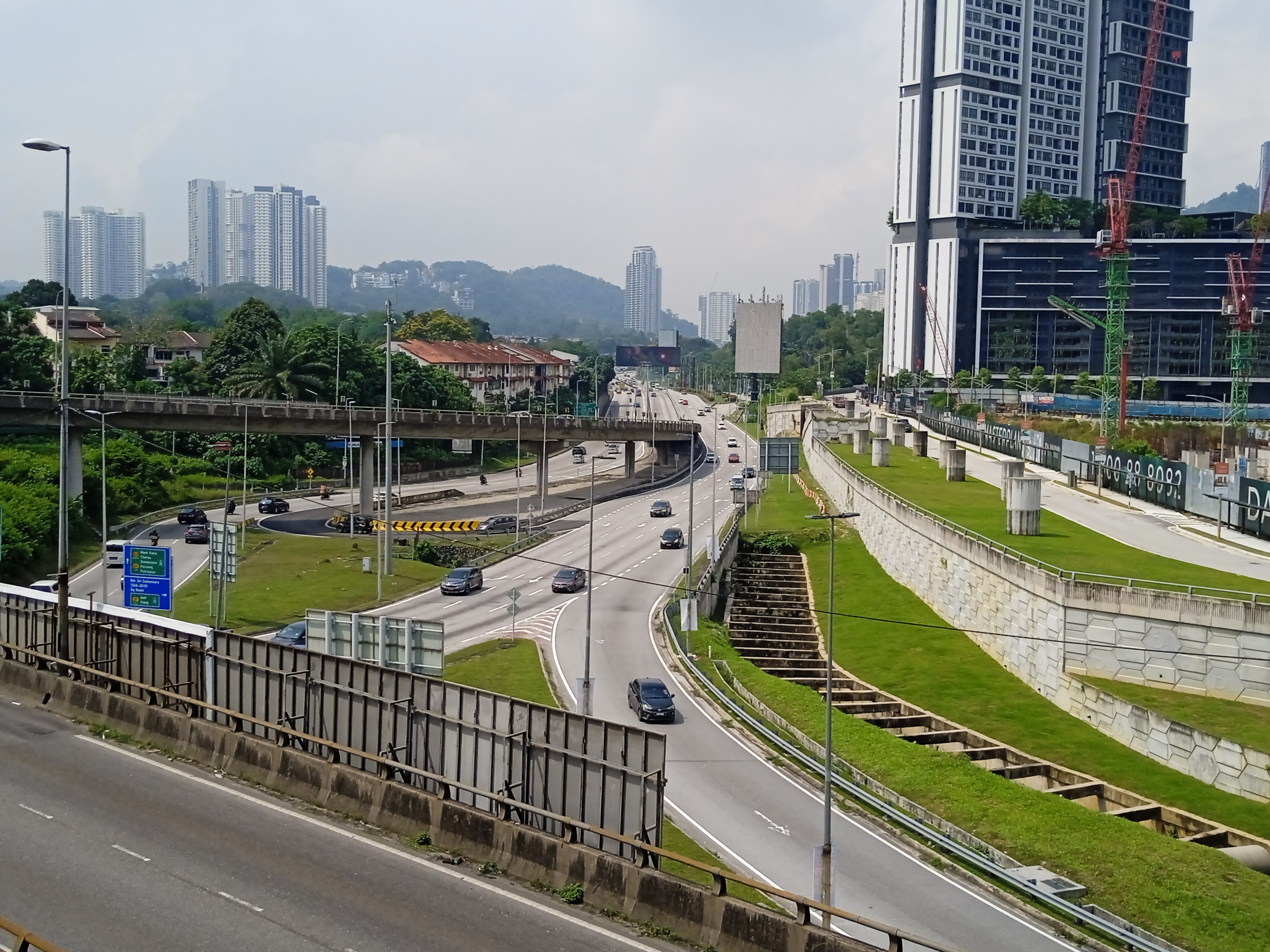
Northern terminus of Damansara–Puchong Expressway in Bandar Sri Damansara, intersection with Malaysia Federal Route 54 and Persiaran Jati

Bandar Sri Damansara has road networks with accessibility via New Klang Valley Expressway, North–South Expressway Northern Route, Sprint Expressway's Penchala Link, and MRR2 Federal Route 28, as well as a shortcut to the Kuala Selangor-Kepong Highway (Malaysia Federal Route 54). The Damansara–Puchong Expressway runs on the eastern boundary of the township. A new Sri Damansara Link to Duta–Ulu Klang Expressway is constructed to allow easier access into the Kuala Lumpur City Centre, and to decrease the traffic congestion in the Damansara–Puchong Expressway (LDP).

=== Public transportation ===
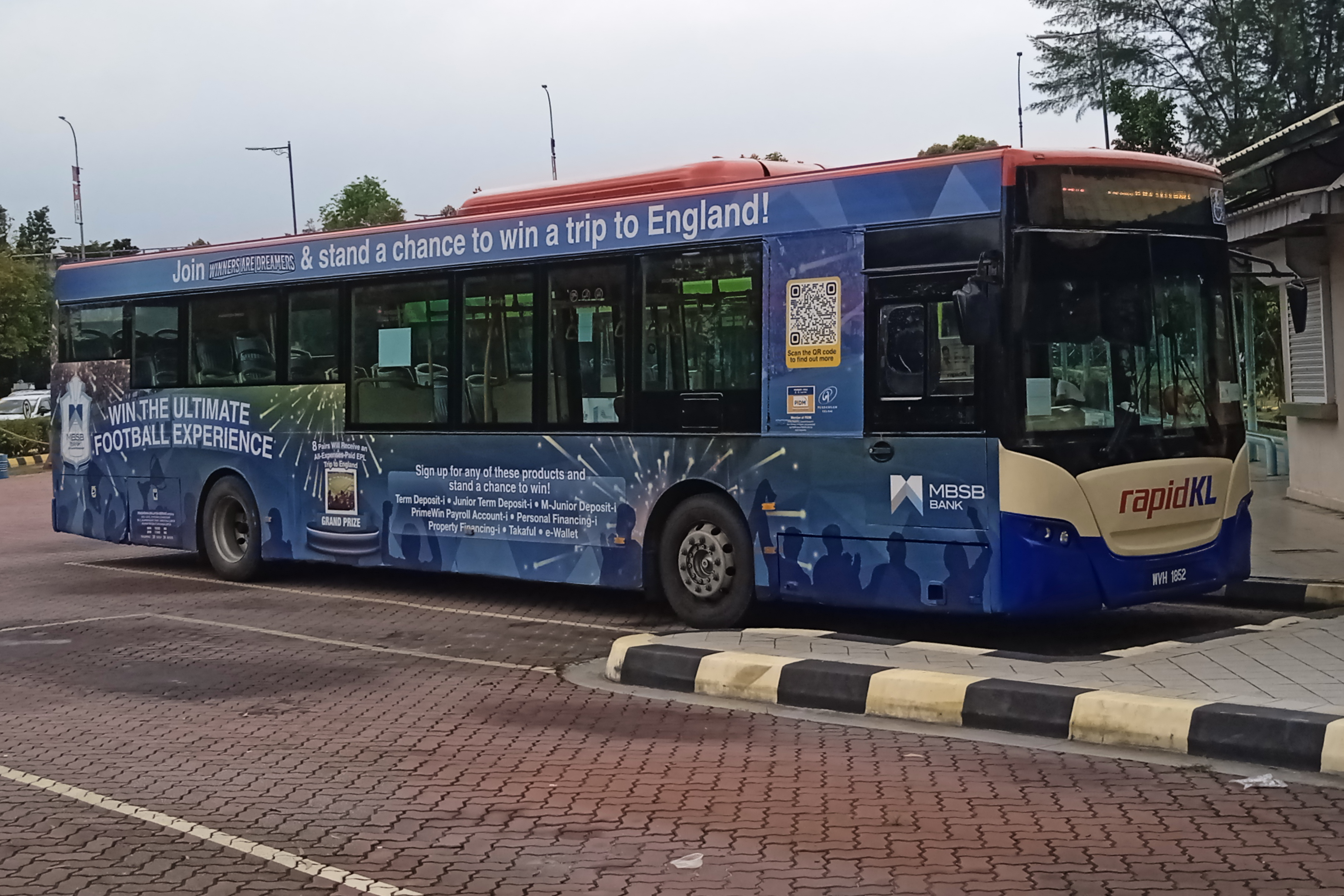
Rapid KL bus route 801 formerly served Bandar Sri Damansara area, at Bandar Utama bus hub

Bandar Sri Damansara is served by three Mass Rapid Transit (MRT) stations, Sri Damansara Barat MRT station, Sri Damansara Sentral MRT station and one with KTM interchange station which is Sri Damansara Timur MRT station & KTM Kepong Sentral station.

MRT Feeder buses (T106, T107, T108 and T110) serve as the first-last mile connectivity in Bandar Sri Damansara, Wangsa Permai, Desa Park City, Bandar Menjalara and Taman Bukit Maluri to Sri Damansara Barat MRT station, Sri Damansara Sentral MRT station and Sri Damansara Timur MRT station & KTM Kepong Sentral station.

RapidKL bus 801 (formerly U86) connects Bandar Sri Damansara to Mutiara Damansara MRT station and KTM Kepong Sentral.

PJ City Bus bus (PJ06) connects Bandar Sri Damansara to Mutiara Damansara MRT station, Bandar Utama station (MRT & LRT) via Bandar Utama bus hub.

== Education ==
=== Elementary ===
- SK Bandar Baru Sri Damansara
- SK Bandar Sri Damansara (1)
- SK Bandar Sri Damansara (2)
- SK Bandar Sri Damansara (3)
- SJK (C) Desa Jaya 2

=== Secondary ===
- SMK Bandar Sri Damansara (1)
- SMK Bandar Sri Damansara (2)

=== International schools ===
- International School - Sri Bestari
- Private School-Sri Aria School

=== Tertiary ===
- Twintech International University College of Technology

== Places of Interest ==
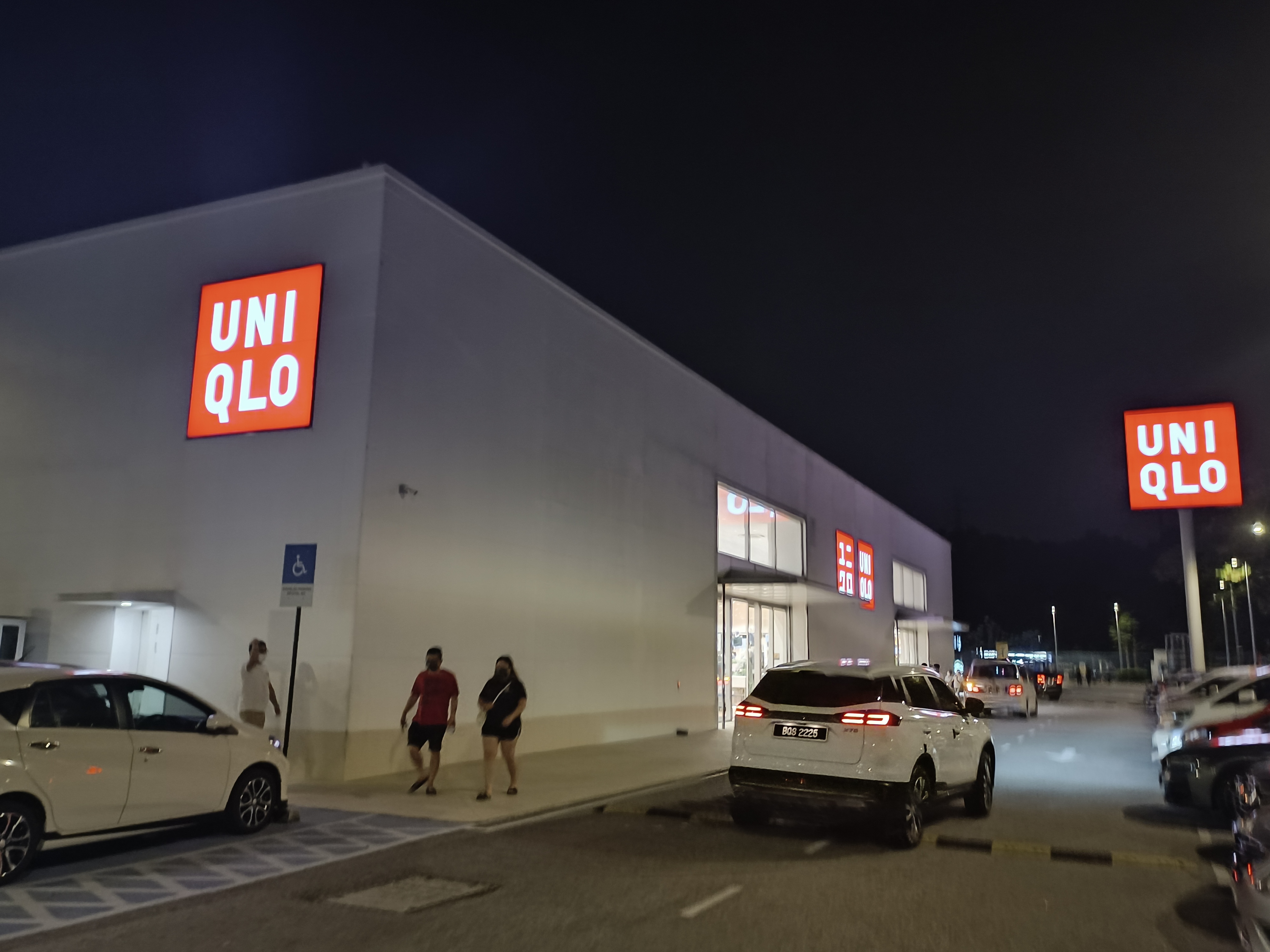
Uniqlo DA Square, Bandar Sri Damansara

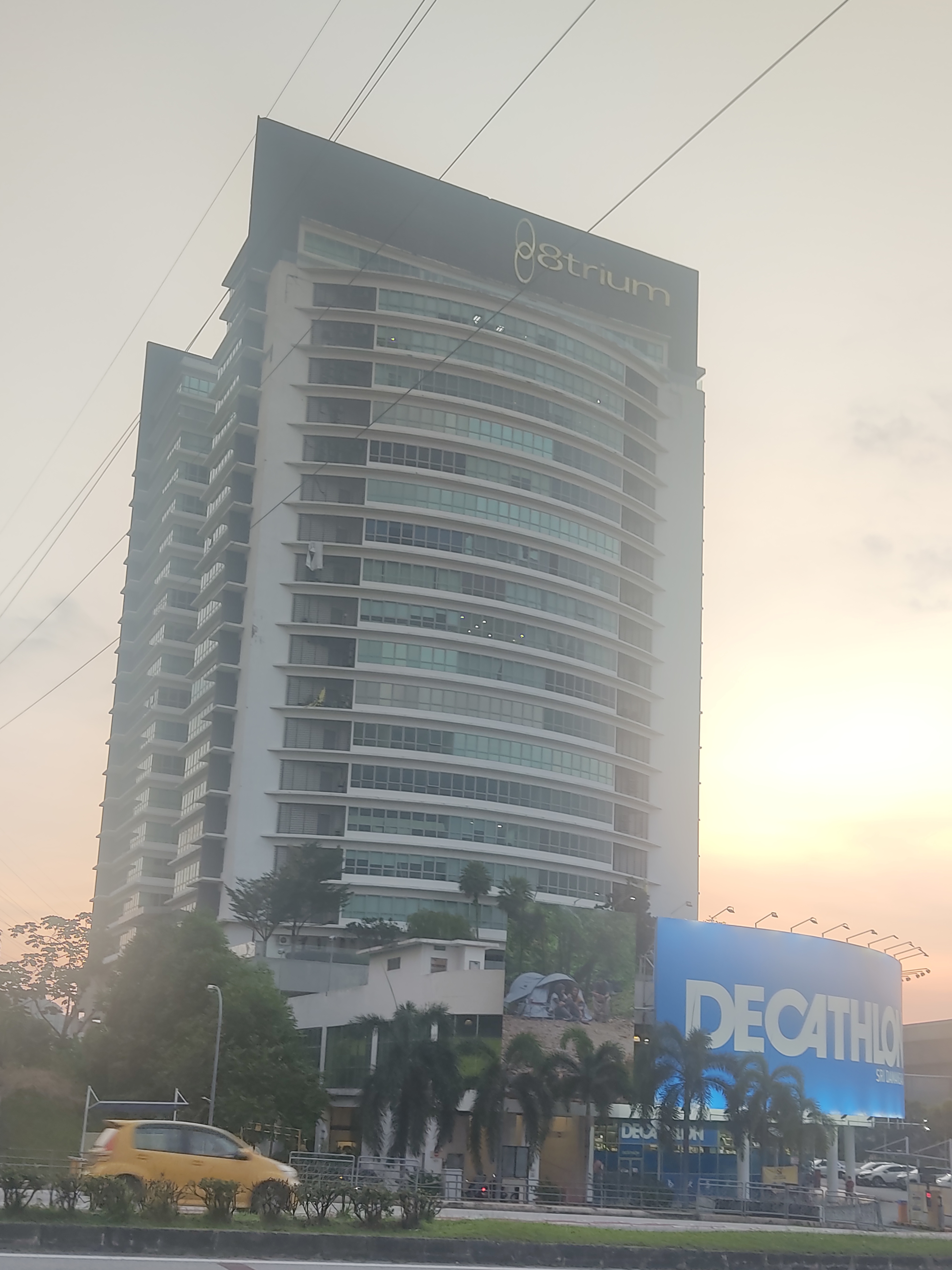
8trium commercial tower

=== Commercial Areas ===
- Uniqlo DA Square
  - The first Uniqlo roadside megastore was opened on 18 December 2020, in DA square @ Damansara Avenue which is in Bandar Sri Damansara. It is 43,650 square feet in area and has a dedicated parking space.
- Ativo Plaza
- 8trium
- Decathlon Bandar Sri Damansara

=== Facilities ===
- Bandar Sri Damansara Residents Association
- Bandar Sri Damansara Police Station
- Aloka Foundation

=== Religious Institutions ===
- Masjid Al-Mukarramah Bandar Sri Damansara
- Methodist Church
- Glad Tidings Church
- Ariya Vihara Buddhist Society
- FBC Chi Bei Xue Hui Buddhist Centre
- Full Gospel Tabernacle Church
- SIBCC Church (City Community)
- Surau Al-Muhajirin

== Administration ==
Bandar Sri Damansara, like most of Damansara, falls under the jurisdiction of the Majlis Bandaraya Petaling Jaya (Petaling Jaya City Council), and is represented in parliament by Gobind Singh Deo of the Democractic Action Party (DAP) under the constituency of Damansara. On the Selangor State Legislative Assembly, Bandar Sri Damansara falls under the constituency of Bukit Lanjan, currently represented by Pua Pei Ling, also from PKR.

== Awards ==
- Bandar Sri Damansara- Winner of the Fiabci Malaysia Property Award 1996
- Damansara Foresta- Asia Pacific 2013 Award & MLAA 2016 Award
- Damansara Avenue- Asia Pacific 2016 Award
- Damansara Seresta- iProperty Development Excellence Awards 2018 (Best Residential High-Rise Development)

== Gallery ==
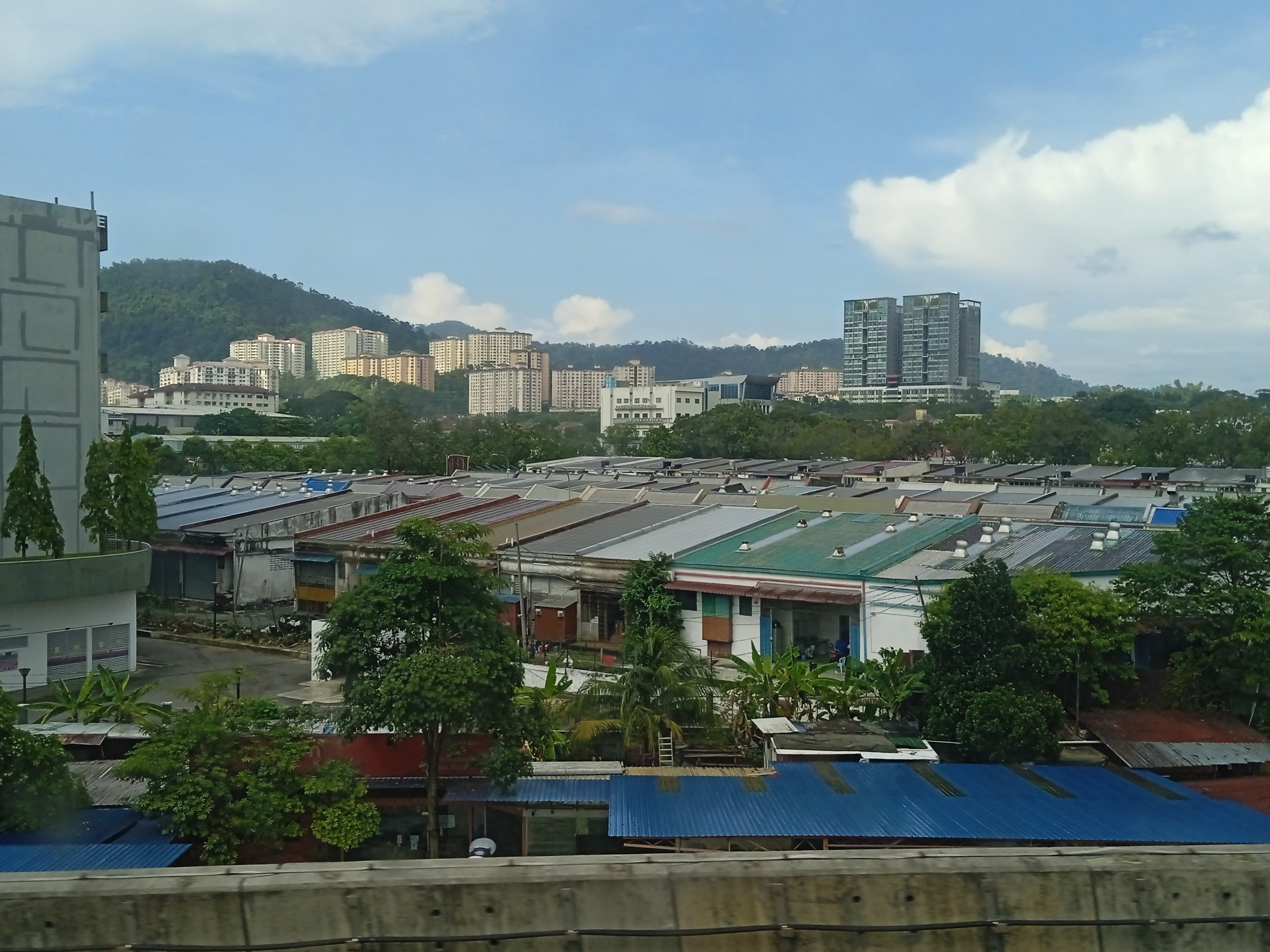
Bandar Sri Damansara, 2023

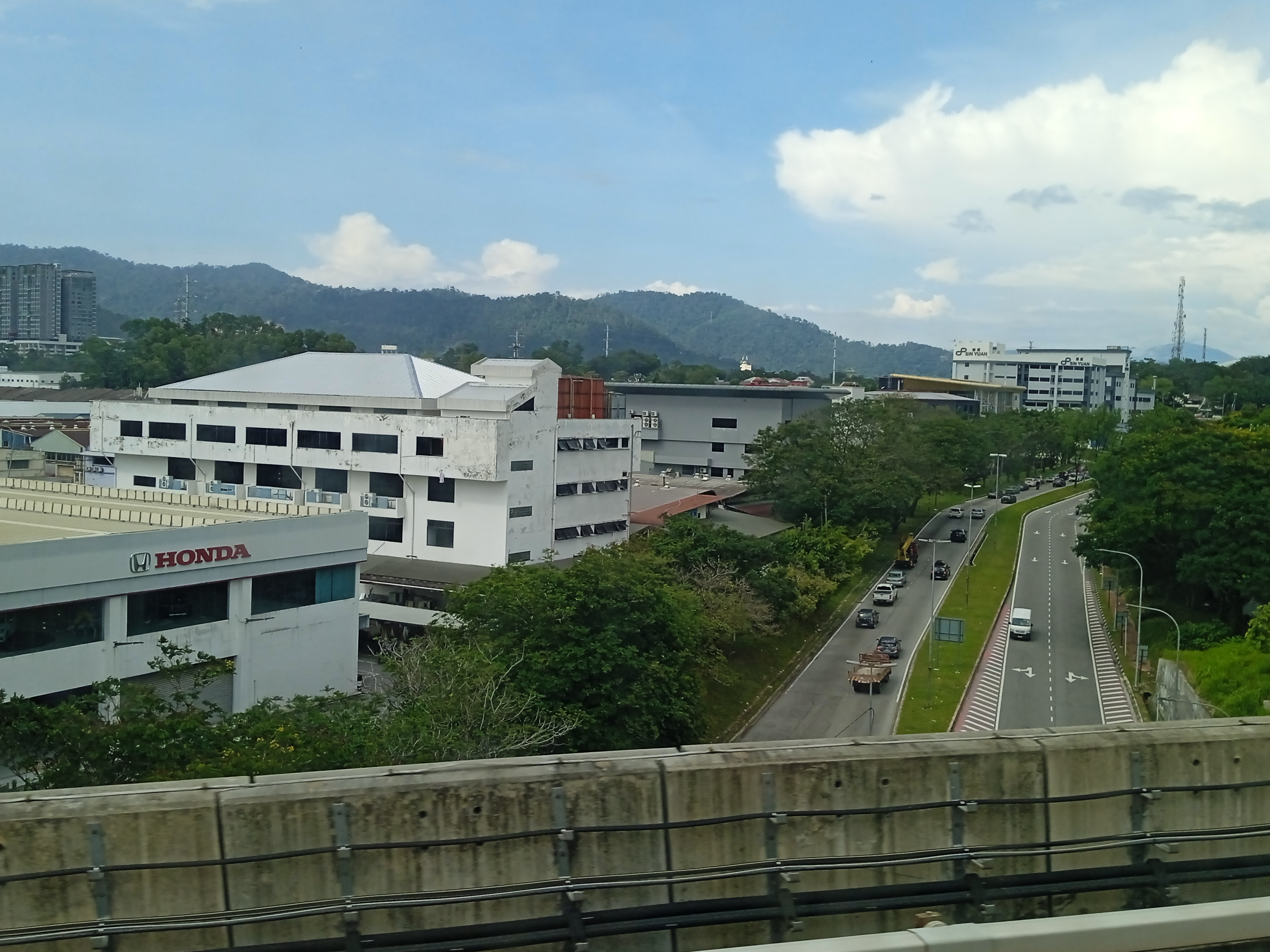
Persiaran Jati, 2023

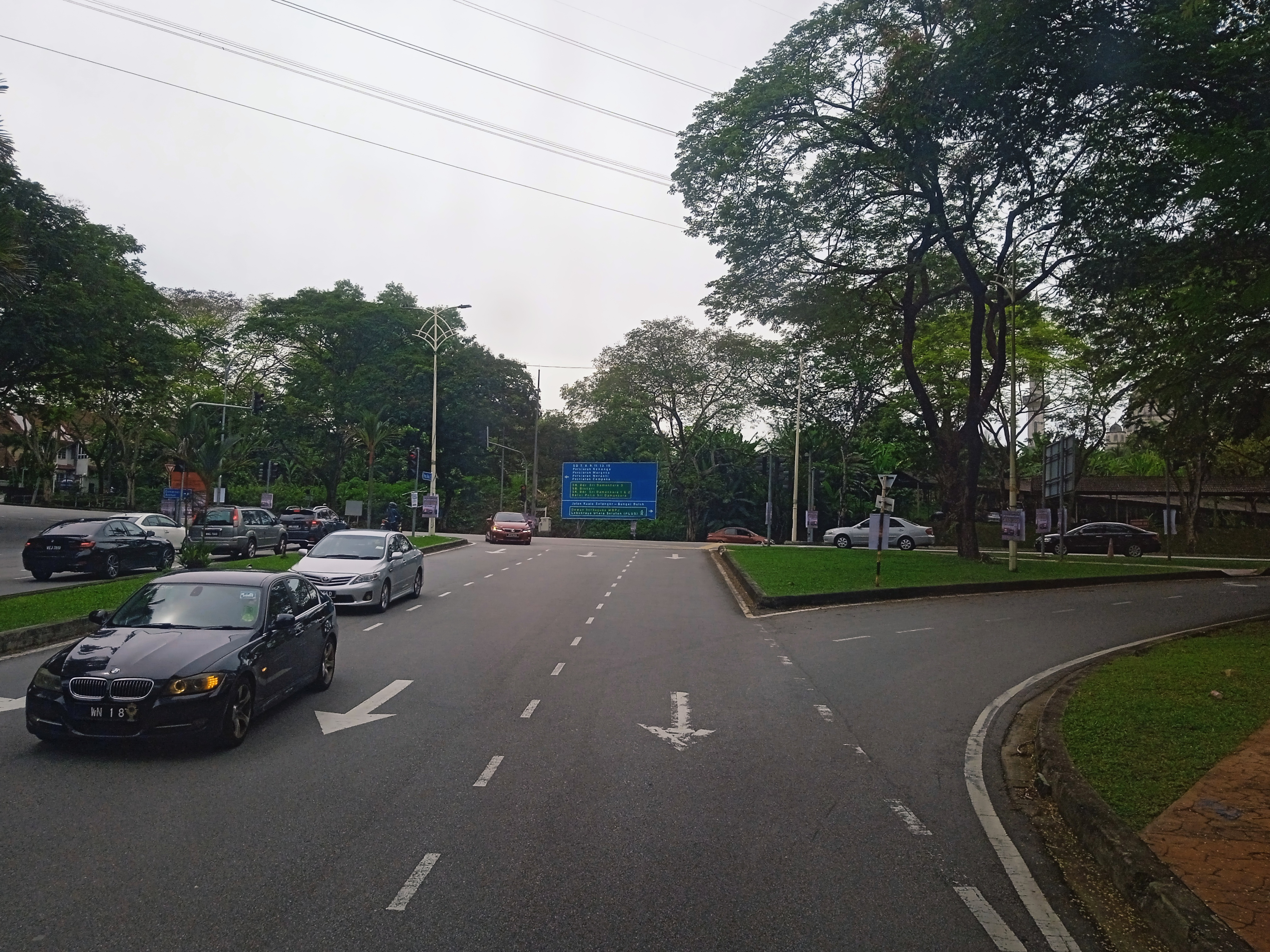
Persiaran Ara, 2023

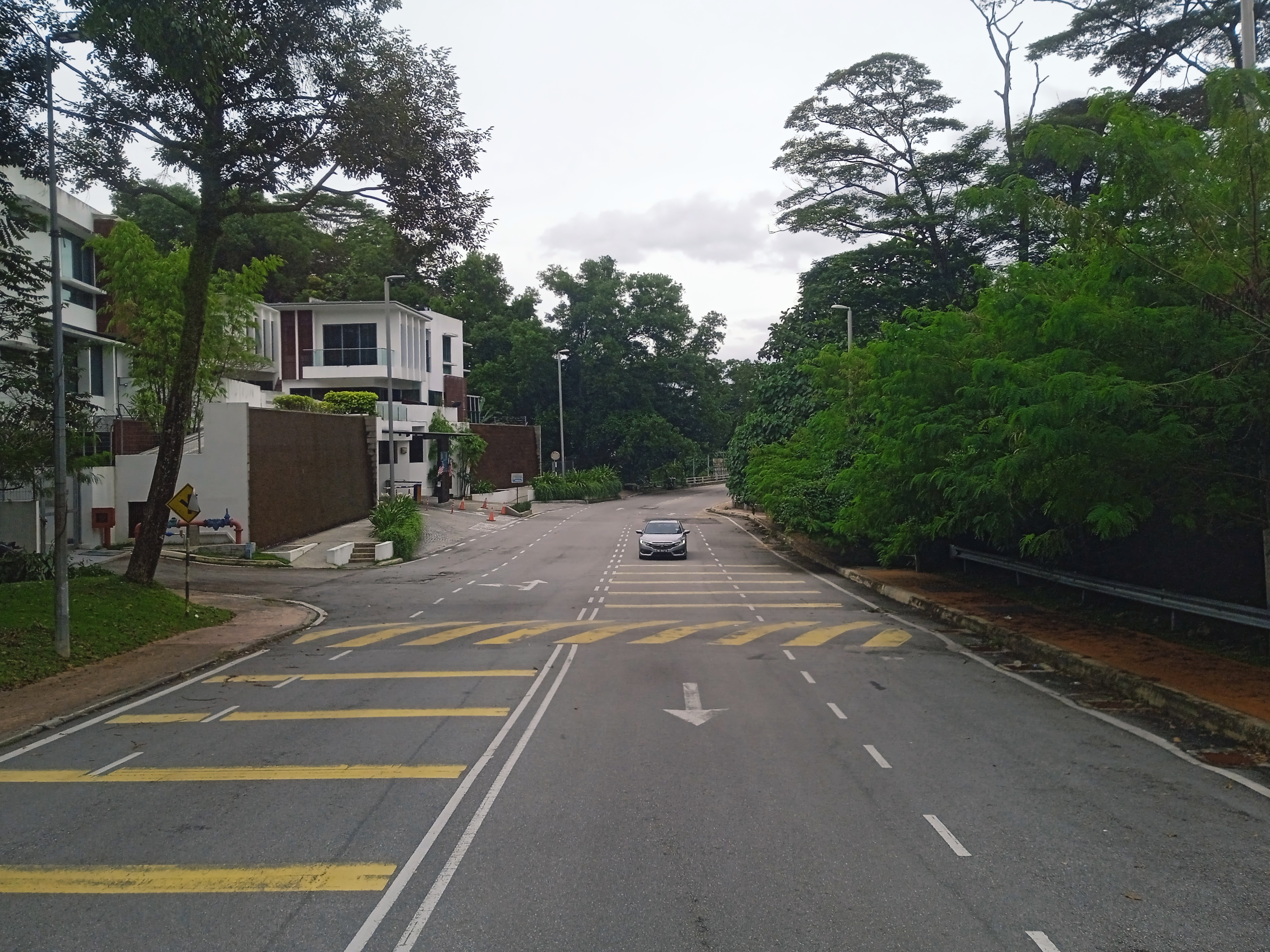
Persiaran Meranti, 2022

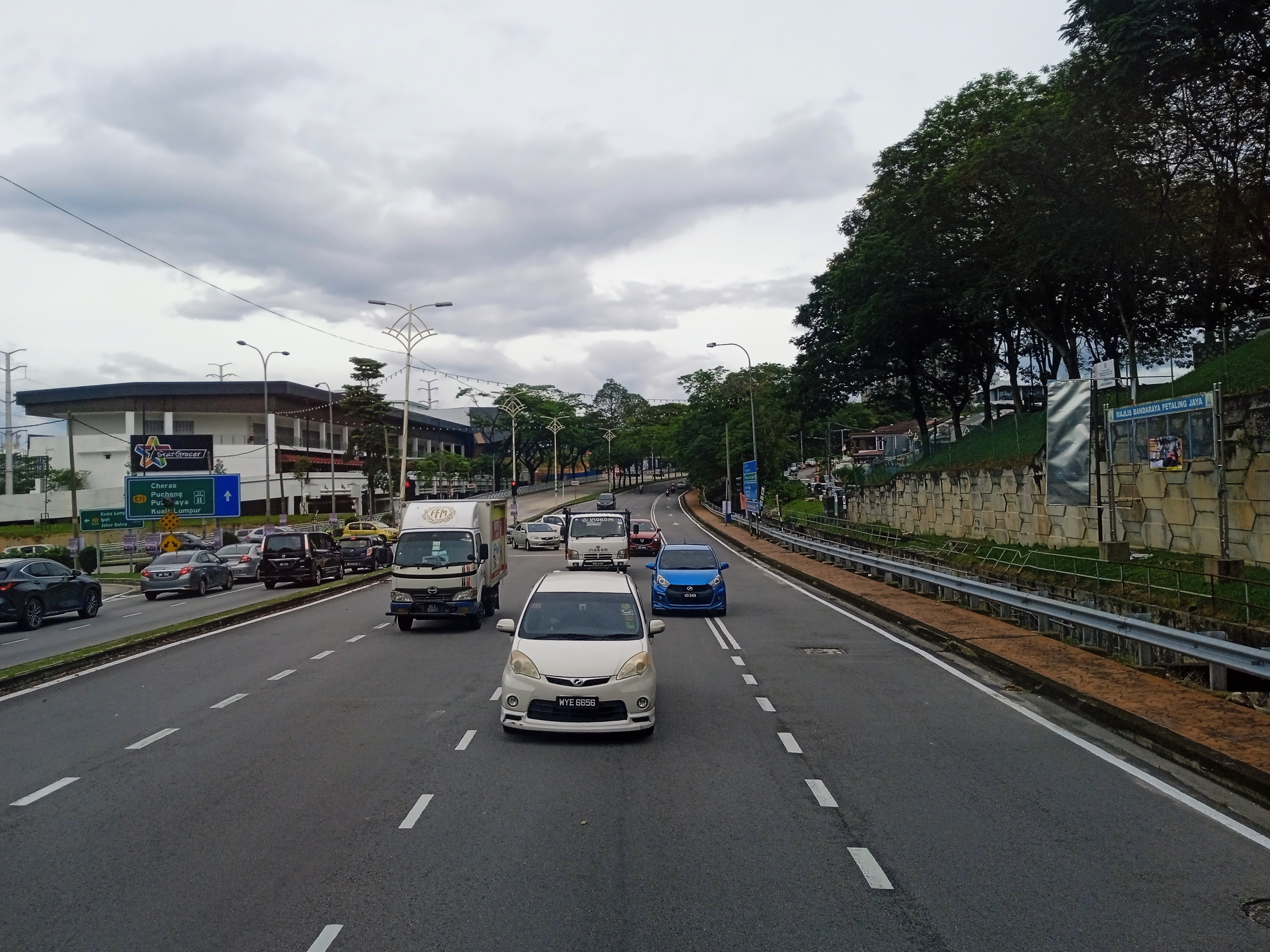
Persiaran Perdana, 2022

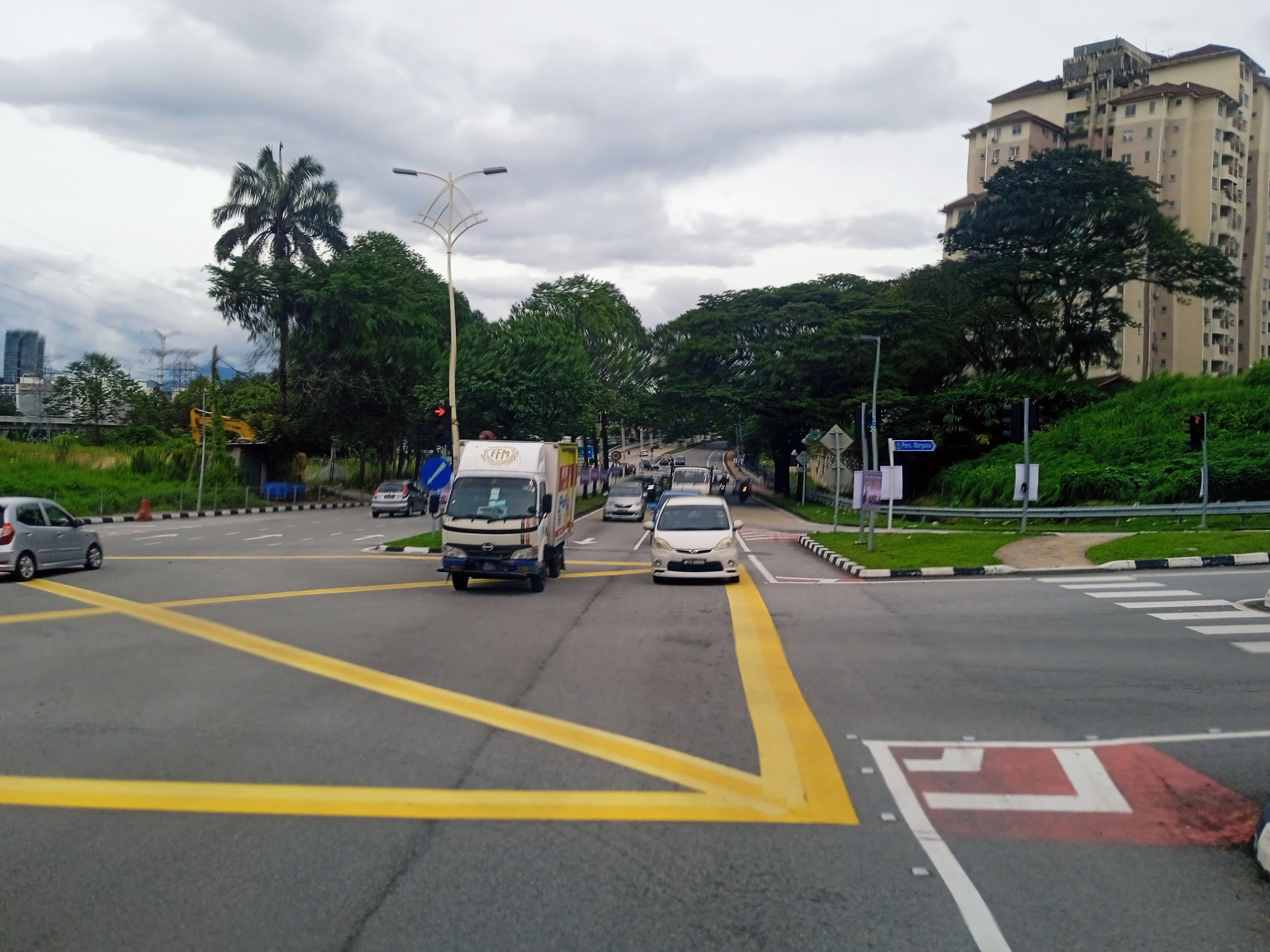
Persiaran Perdana-Persiaran Margosa Intersection, 2023
