= MBPJ Tower =

Government building in Petaling, Selangor, Malaysia

Menara MBPJ
- MBPJ Tower
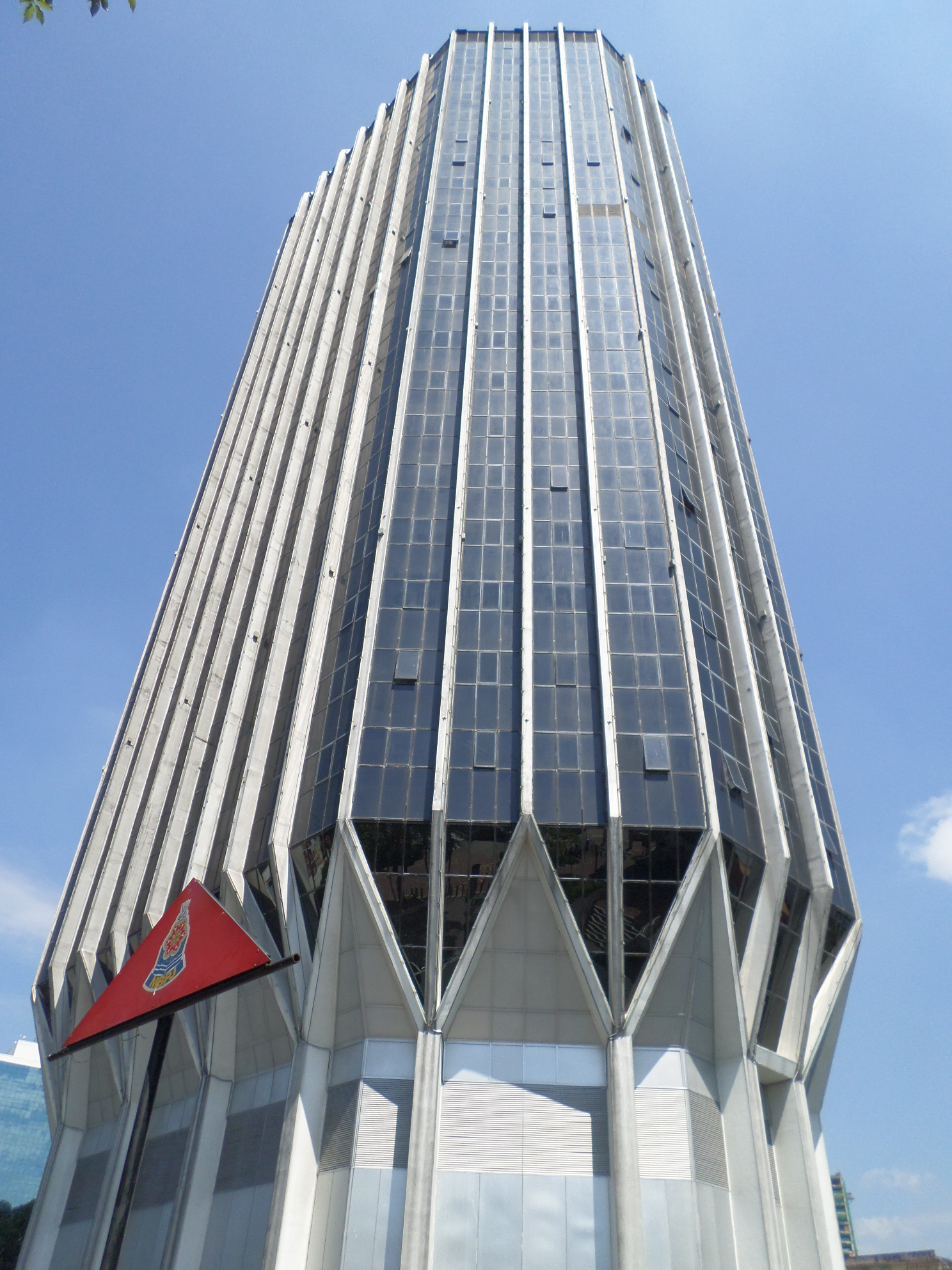
- Interactive map of the Menara MBPJ area

General information
- Type: Office
- Location: Petaling Jaya, Malaysia
- Coordinates: 3°05′57″N 101°38′42″E
- Construction started: 1984
- Completed: 1987
- Opening: October 1987

Height
- Roof: 152 m (499 ft)

Technical details
- Floor count: 24

Design and construction
- Architect: Majlis Perbandaran Petaling Jaya (MPPJ)

MBPJ Tower or Menara MBPJ (formerly Menara MPPJ or MPPJ Tower) is a major landmark in Petaling Jaya, Selangor, Malaysia. It houses several commercial facilities and is one of the earliest skyscrapers in the city. It is located in Petaling Jaya New Town (Section 52).

The tower was built by Promet Berhad – an oil rig and building construction company – at a cost of RM 50 million, and was expected to be completed by May 1985. The tower, which is the first of its kind to be built by a local authority, is used to generate income. Each rented floor would generate about RM 500,000 annually.

The building was officially opened in October 1987 by Almarhum Sultan Salahuddin Abdul Aziz Shah of Selangor.

== Structures in the Menara MBPJ ==
- Main tower
- Plaza
