= Twintech International University College of Technology =

Private university college in Malaysia

- 双德国际科技大学学院
- Former names: L&G-Twintech Institute Of Technology (1994-2003)
- Motto: Education at its Best
- Type: Private university college
- Established: 1993
- Affiliations: Edexcel
- Vice-Chancellor: Prof. Dr. Siva Sunasundram
- Location: Petaling Jaya, Selangor, Malaysia; 3.116°N 101.628°E
- Campus: Main Campus (Petaling Jaya)
- Colours: Blue
- Website: newtwintech.edu.my

The Twintech International University College of Technology, or Twintech for short, is a private publicly funded university college in Malaysia. The college's campus has moved to Petaling Jaya, Selangor. It was previously located in George Town, Penang, and formerly Bandar Sri Damansara, Selangor.

Twintech International University College of Technology, formerly known as L&G-Twintech Institute of Technology, is a private institution of higher learning licensed by the Ministry of Education. The college was founded in 1993 and was upgraded to Twintech International University College of Technology in 2003. The university college is owned and managed by Twintech Holding Sdn. Bhd.

The university was founded to provide training in the fields of Architecture & Built Environment, Business & Finance, Computer Science & Multimedia, Engineering & Industrial Technology, Biotechnology, Nursing & Health Science, Optometry, Education, Music & Performing Art.

Twintech started from a modest, rented premises in Setapak. It previously had three campuses located in Bandar Sri Damansara, Kota Kinabalu, and Kota Bharu, with facilities and amenities, including computing suites, engineering laboratories, architectural studios, and biotechnology laboratories.

Twintech has around 4,000 students studying local and overseas twinning programmes. Approximately 150 local and overseas full-time lecturers support the academic programmes at Twintech.

All programmes will be awarded internally; some will be quality-controlled by universities from United Kingdom and local universities. The university offers programme such B. Optometry (Hons), B. Nursing, B. Biotechnology and more. Over 61 programmes are under approval status, another 42 programmes are within provisional status and 24 programmes are fully accredited status with the MQA (Malaysian Qualifications Agency).

== Faculties and centres ==
- Faculty of Engineering & Industrial Technology (FEIT)
- Faculty of Computer Science & Multimedia (FCSM)
- Faculty of Architecture & Build Environment (FABE)
- Faculty of Biotechnology (FBT) since 2005
- Faculty of Optometry (FOP) since 2004
- Faculty of Nursing & Health Science (FNHS) since 2007
- Faculty of Business & Finance (FBF)
- Faculty of Music, Media & Performing Arts (FMPA)
- Faculty of Education (FED)
- Centre of Language & Malaysian Studies (CLMS)
- Twintech Business School (TBS)
- Ocean Institute of Audio Technology (OIAT)
