= The Curve (shopping mall) =

Shopping mall in Petaling, Selangor, Malaysia

the Curve
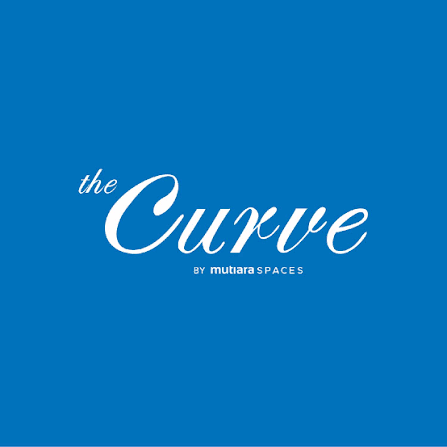

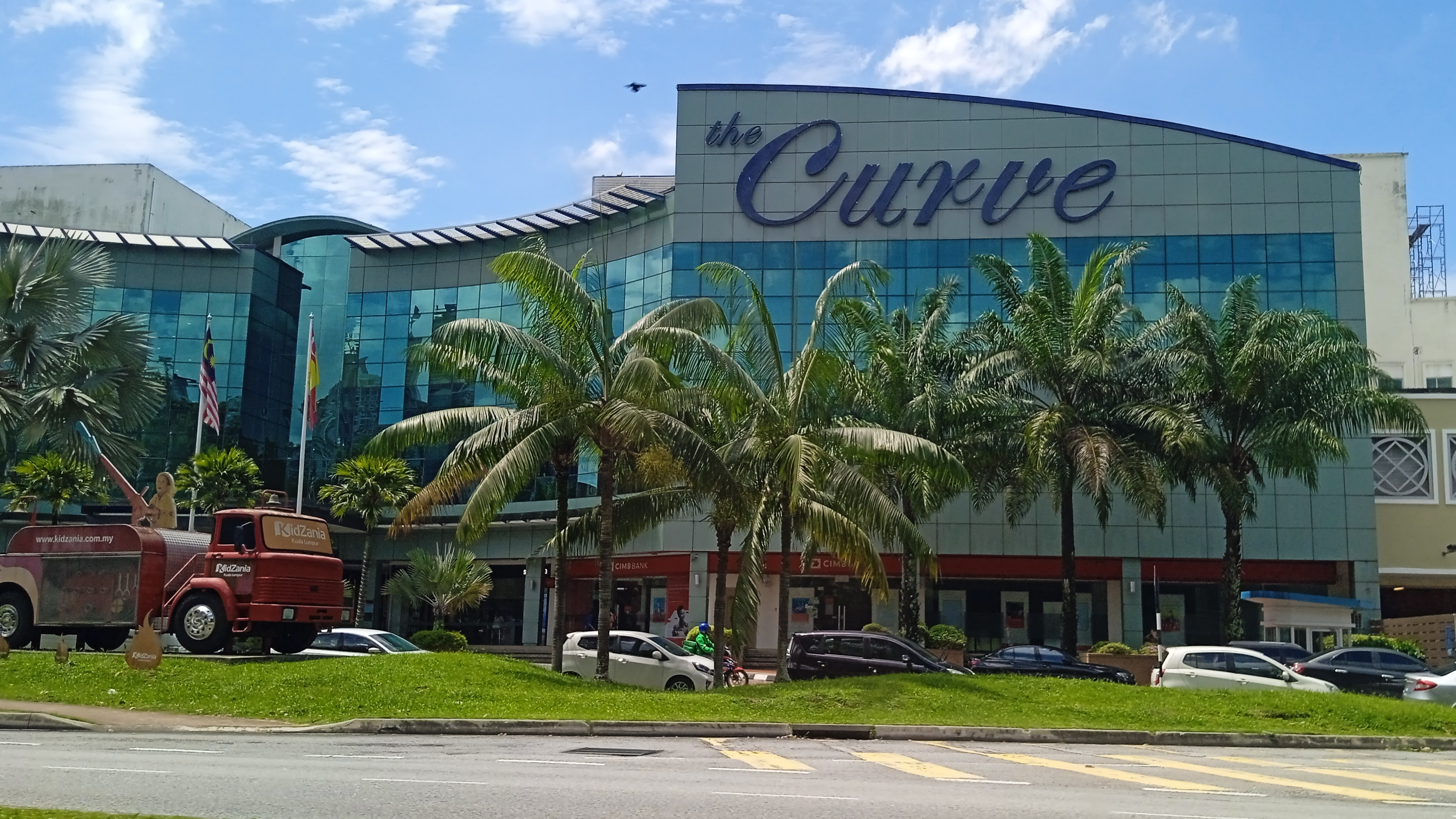
- The Curve in 2023
- Location: Mutiara Damansara, Petaling Jaya, Selangor, Malaysia
- Coordinates: 3.1579199°N 101.6120082°E
- Opened: 2005
- Developer: Boustead Properties Berhad
- Num. of stores: 250
- Floors: 3
- Website: https://www.thecurve.com.my/

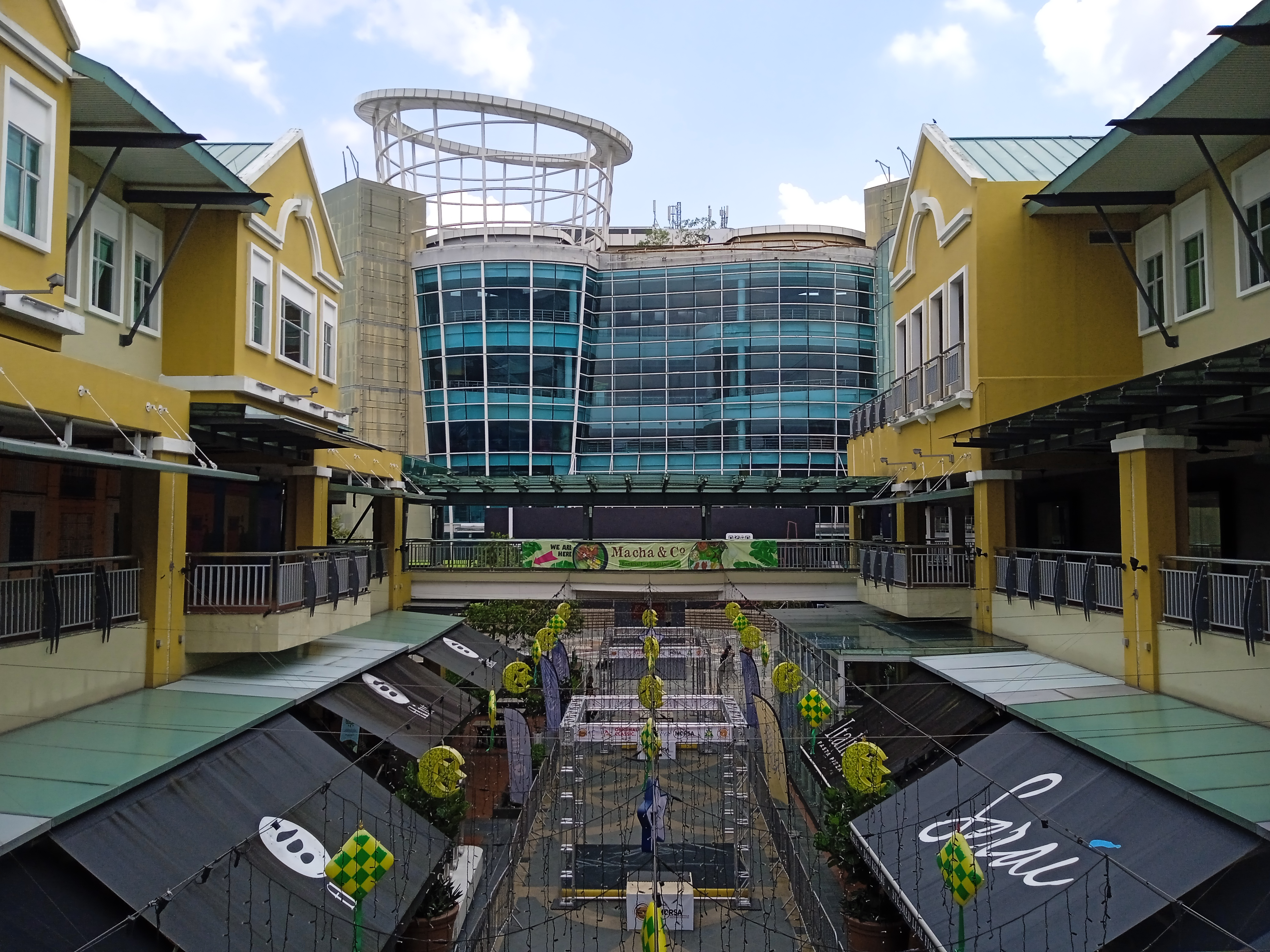
"The Street" area in the Curve

The Curve is a shopping mall located in Mutiara Damansara, Petaling Jaya, Selangor, Malaysia. Opened in 2005, it features an open-air, pedestrian-friendly design with a central piazza that serves as a social and event space. The mall is part of the larger Mutiara Damansara commercial development and is connected to adjacent properties such as IKEA & IPC Shopping Centre.

== Location and access ==
The mall is accessible via five major routes:

- North Klang Valley Expressway (NKVE)
- Lebuhraya Damansara-Puchong (LDP)
- Sprint Expressway (Penchala Link)
- Damansara Perdana
- Persiaran Surian

A covered passageway connects directly to the Mutiara Damansara MRT station on the Klang Valley Mass Rapid Transit's Kajang line, providing public transportation access.

== Features ==
Key characteristics include:

- Basement parking facilities
- Mix of international and local retail tenants
- Regular events in the Centre Court space
- Adjacent to office towers and hotels

The mall has hosted numerous promotional campaigns and seasonal events, including Christmas celebrations featuring large-scale decorations.

== History ==
=== Development and early years (2005-2010) ===
The Curve was developed by Boustead Properties Berhad as part of the Mutiara Damansara township project. Key milestones:

- 2005: Opened as Malaysia's first open-air pedestrian mall on 13 acres (5.3 ha), featuring:
- 450,000 sq ft retail space
- Connection to Royale Chulan Hotel (now The Club Hotel)
- Initial anchor tenants: Cold Storage, GSC
- 2006: Hosted Malaysia Mega Sale Carnival and introduced "Curvy Bunnies" promotional event

=== Expansion and revitalization (2011-2020) ===
- **2012-2015**: Added new wings and renovated existing spaces to accommodate:
- Expanded F&B offerings
- Pop-up market concepts
- Family entertainment zones
- 2016: Connected to Mutiara Damansara MRT station via covered walkway following KVMRT Kajang Line opening
- 2019: Underwent major tenant reshuffle after several anchor store closures, introducing more experiential retail concepts

=== Recent developments (2021-present) ===
- 2022: Announced "K-Culture Zone" featuring:
- Korean beauty brands
- K-pop merchandise stores
- Themed F&B outlets
- 2024: 20th anniversary celebrations included:
- "Slide the Curve" water slide event (Sept 2024)
- Malaysia Book of Records achievement for largest Raya greeting card display (April 2024)

Key structural changes:

Major renovations
Year	Area upgraded	Changes made
2012	North Wing	Added 30 specialty stores
2015	Central Piazza	Installed retractable rain canopy
2019	West Wing	Converted to F&B hub
