= IPC Shopping Centre =

Shopping mall in Petaling, Selangor, Malaysia

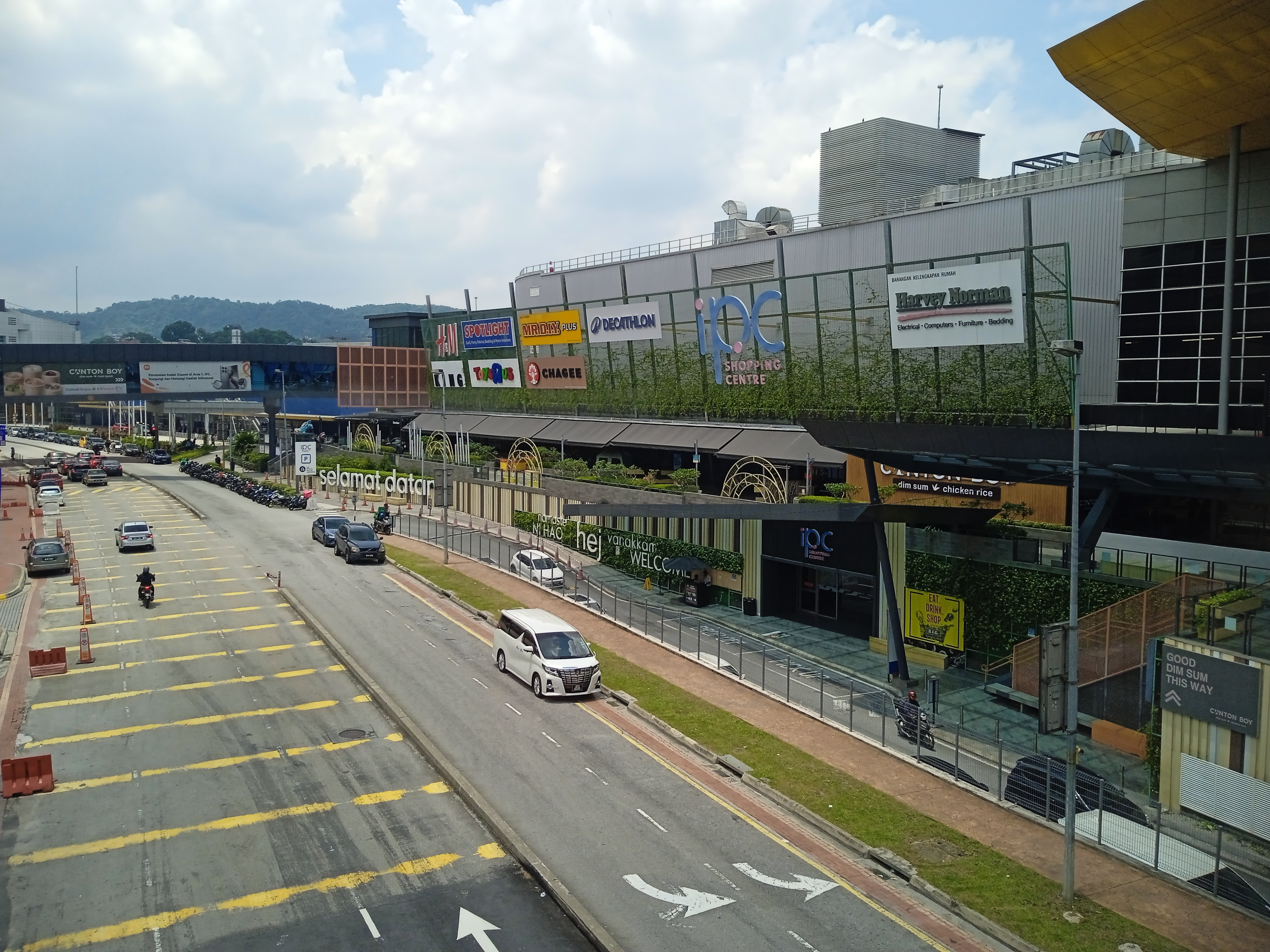
- View of IPC Shopping Centre, April 2025
- Location: Mutiara Damansara, Petaling Jaya, Selangor, Malaysia
- Coordinates: 3°09′25.6″N 101°36′41.9″E
- Address: 2, Jalan PJU 7/2
- Opened: December 2003 (Ikano Power Centre); March 2011 (Rebranded to IPC Shopping Centre); November 2017 (Reopening of IPC Shopping Centre after renovation)
- Owner: Ikano
- Num. of stores: 145
- Floors: 5
- Parking: 2100
- Public transit: Mutiara Damansara MRT station (via The Curve)
- Website: www.ipc.com.my

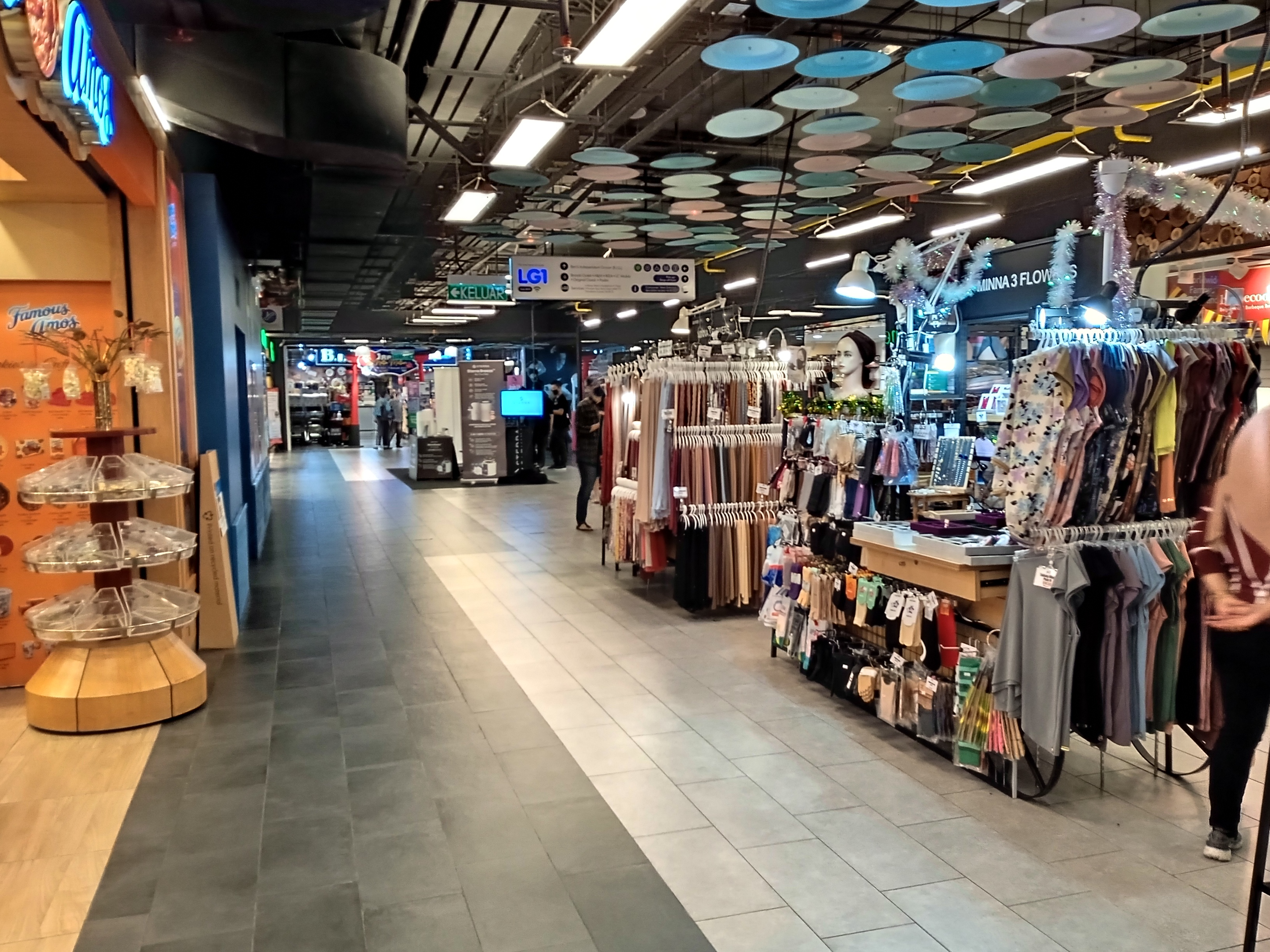
Level LG1 of IPC Shopping Centre

IPC Shopping Centre (formerly Ikano Power Centre) is a shopping centre anchored by IKEA near The Curve in Mutiara Damansara, Selangor, Malaysia. It opened on 18 December 2003 and has 5 floors. It was formerly known as the Ikano Power Centre. After extensive renovations, it opened in November 2017 as IPC Shopping Centre.

== Renovation ==
IPC Shopping Centre during its renovation, November 2017

In March 2017, IPC Shopping Centre began its first major renovation, in time for the mall's 15th anniversary. The renovation involved the entire shopping centre, including refurbishing the facade. During renovation parking spaces remained unchanged and the mall stayed open as usual. However, most tenants (except IKEA and Harvey Norman) in the Shopping Centre were briefly relocated or moved out. The renovation was completed on 29 January 2018.

== Access ==
=== Public transportation ===
KG08 Mutiara Damansara MRT station

=== Car ===
- Damansara–Puchong Expressway LDP from downtown Petaling Jaya, Subang Jaya, Puchong or Kepong
- Sprint Expressway Sprint Penchala Link from Segambut and downtown Kuala Lumpur

== See also ==
- Mutiara Damansara
