= Petaling Jaya City Council =

Malaysian city council

- (MBPJ) Majlis Bandaraya Petaling Jaya

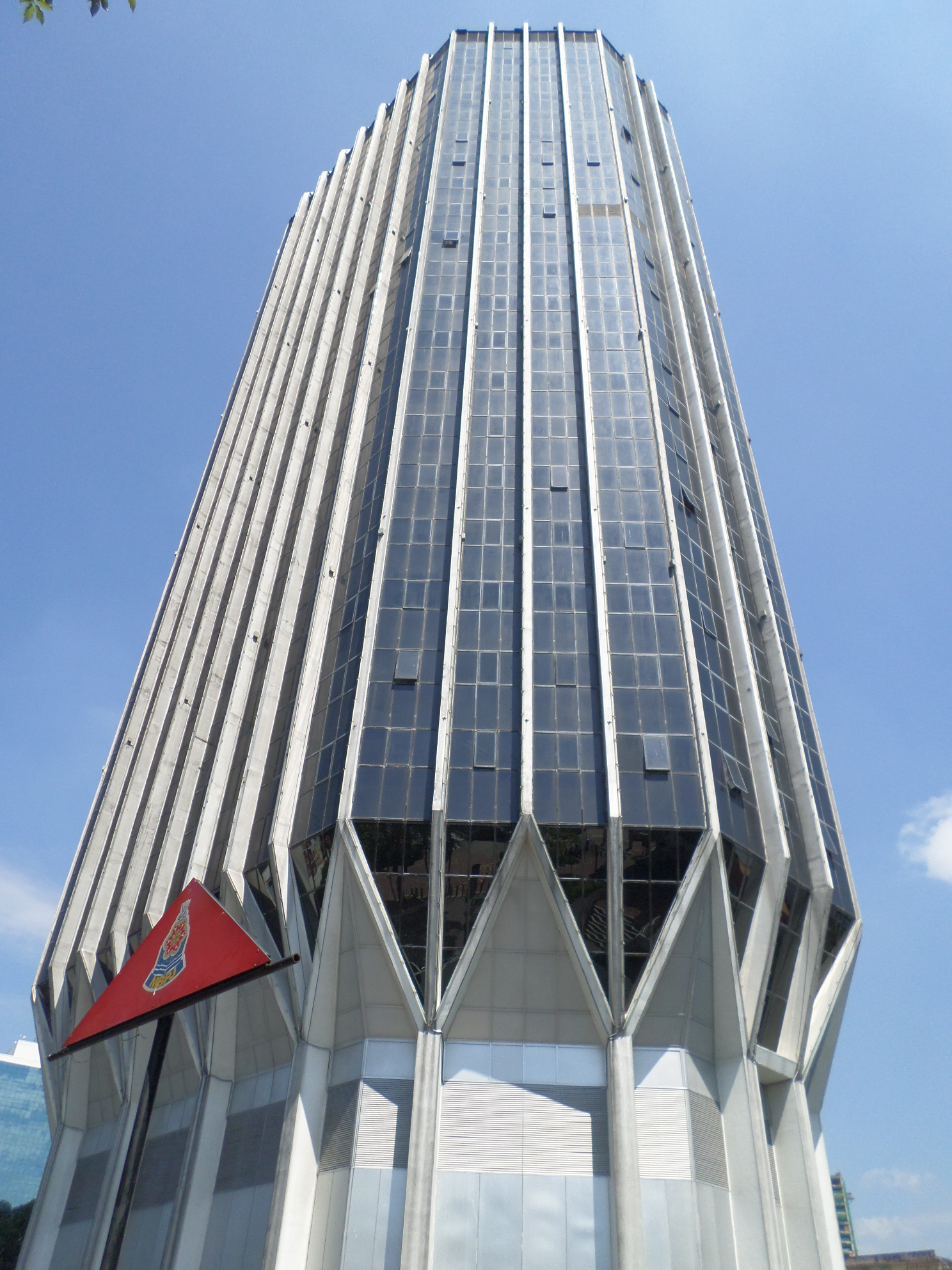

Agency overview
- Formed: 20 June 2006; 19 years ago
- Preceding agency: Petaling Jaya Municipal Council
- Jurisdiction: City of Petaling Jaya
- Headquarters: Jalan Yong Shook Lin, 46675 Petaling Jaya, Selangor, Malaysia
- Motto: Friendly, Fast and Precise (Mesra, Cepat, dan Tepat)
- Employees: 1981 (2023)
- Annual budget: MYR 479,488,450 (2017)
- Agency executives: Haji Mohamad Zahri Haji Samingon, Mayor; Aznan Hj Hassan, Deputy Mayor; Ir. Ismail Hj Shafie, Deputy City Secretary (Development); Tuan Mohd Fauzi bin Maarop, Deputy City Secretary (Management)
- Website: www.mbpj.gov.my

Administrative area of Petaling Jaya City Council

The Petaling Jaya City Council (Malay: Majlis Bandaraya Petaling Jaya, abbreviated MBPJ) is the city council which administers the city of Petaling Jaya in the state of Selangor, Malaysia. This council was established after the city was officially granted city status on 20 June 2006. Their jurisdiction covers an area of 97.2 square kilometres.

The council consists of the mayor plus twenty-four councillors appointed to serve a one-year term by the Selangor State Government. MBPJ is responsible for public health and sanitation, waste removal and management, town planning, environmental protection and building control, social and economic development and general maintenance functions of urban infrastructure.

== History ==
In the early 1950s, Kuala Lumpur experienced congestion as a result of a rapid population growth and squatters existing in the outskirts of Kuala Lumpur. To overcome this problem, the State Government identified "Effingham Estate", a 1,200-acre rubber plantation in Jalan Klang Lama to create a new settlement known as Petaling Jaya.

The party entrusted to govern the new settlement was the District Officer of the Kuala Lumpur and Petaling Jaya Board before being taken over by a statutory body, namely the Petaling Jaya Town Authority at the end of 1954.

Petaling Jaya made history on 1 January 1964 when the Selangor State Government gazetted a Township Board with financial autonomy to govern the city.

On 1 January 1977, Petaling Jaya Town Authority was upgraded to the Petaling Jaya Municipal Council (MPPJ), pursuant to the Local Government Act 1976 by the government. On 20 June 2006, the Petaling Jaya Municipal Council was upgraded as the Petaling Jaya City Council.

Now, the administrative area of MBPJ is 97.2 square kilometres which is rapidly growing. Petaling Jaya has a total population of over 619,925 people and the number of property holding of 217,930. Petaling Jaya is now known as the leading growth centre in Selangor.

The City Council consists of 24 councillors led by a mayor. Councillors are appointed by the Selangor State Executive Council. The Mayor is an officer of the Federal Government appointed by the state administration after obtaining the consent of the Menteri Besar. A mayor works full-time, assisted by a Deputy Mayor and Head of the Departments in setting and implementing the vision, mission, quality policy, objectives and activities of the council. The Council approved a Council legislation draft and forming policies to be implemented by the departments.

== Mayors of Petaling Jaya ==
Since 2006, the city has been led by four mayors. The previous and incumbent mayors are listed as below:

No.	Mayor	Term start	Term end
1	Ahmad Termizi Puteh	20 June 2006	28 August 2006
2	Mohammad Roslan Sakiman	28 August 2006	1 January 2013
3	Alinah Ahmad	1 January 2013	31 December 2014
4	Mohd. Azizi Mohd. Zain	1 April 2015	4 April 2019
5	Mohd Sayuthi Bakar	4 April 2019	21 October 2021
6	Mohamad Azhan Md. Azmir	21 October 2021	31 January 2024
7	Mohamad Zahri Samingon	1 February 2024	Incumbent

== Current councillors ==
Twenty-one councillors were sworn in on 18 January 2024, while the other four vacancies were filled on 30 April 2024.

=== 2024-2025 Term ===
PH (24)
- PKR (12)
- DAP (10)
- AMANAH (2)

Zone	Councillor	Party
1	Suriase Gengiah	PKR
2	Chan Pak Keung	PKR
3	Tang Fuie Koh	PKR
4	Mohd Ikhshan Mohamad Din	PKR
5	Wong Swee Sang	DAP
6	Quratulain Atiqah Norzahirul Anuar	DAP
7	Leong Chee Cheng	DAP
8	Loh Y Lun	DAP
9	Yip Sean Yi	DAP
10	Christopher Ong Kean Li	PKR
11	Kusaaliny Mahendran	DAP
12	Terence Tan Teck Seng	DAP
13	Ng Yih Miin	PKR
14	Sugumaran Annamalai	PKR
15	Ahmad Akhir Pawan Chik	PKR
16	Tan Wei Kiat	DAP
17	Norah Mansor	PKR
18	Muhammad Nabil Halimi	PKR
19	Nalina Nair Rama Krishnan	DAP
20	Ong Yew Thai	DAP
21	Rozazitah Ahmad	PKR
22	Mohamed Hamka Mohamed Jumah	AMANAH
23	Nurashikin Ali	AMANAH
24	Farhan Shah Ridzuan	PKR

== Departments and Units ==
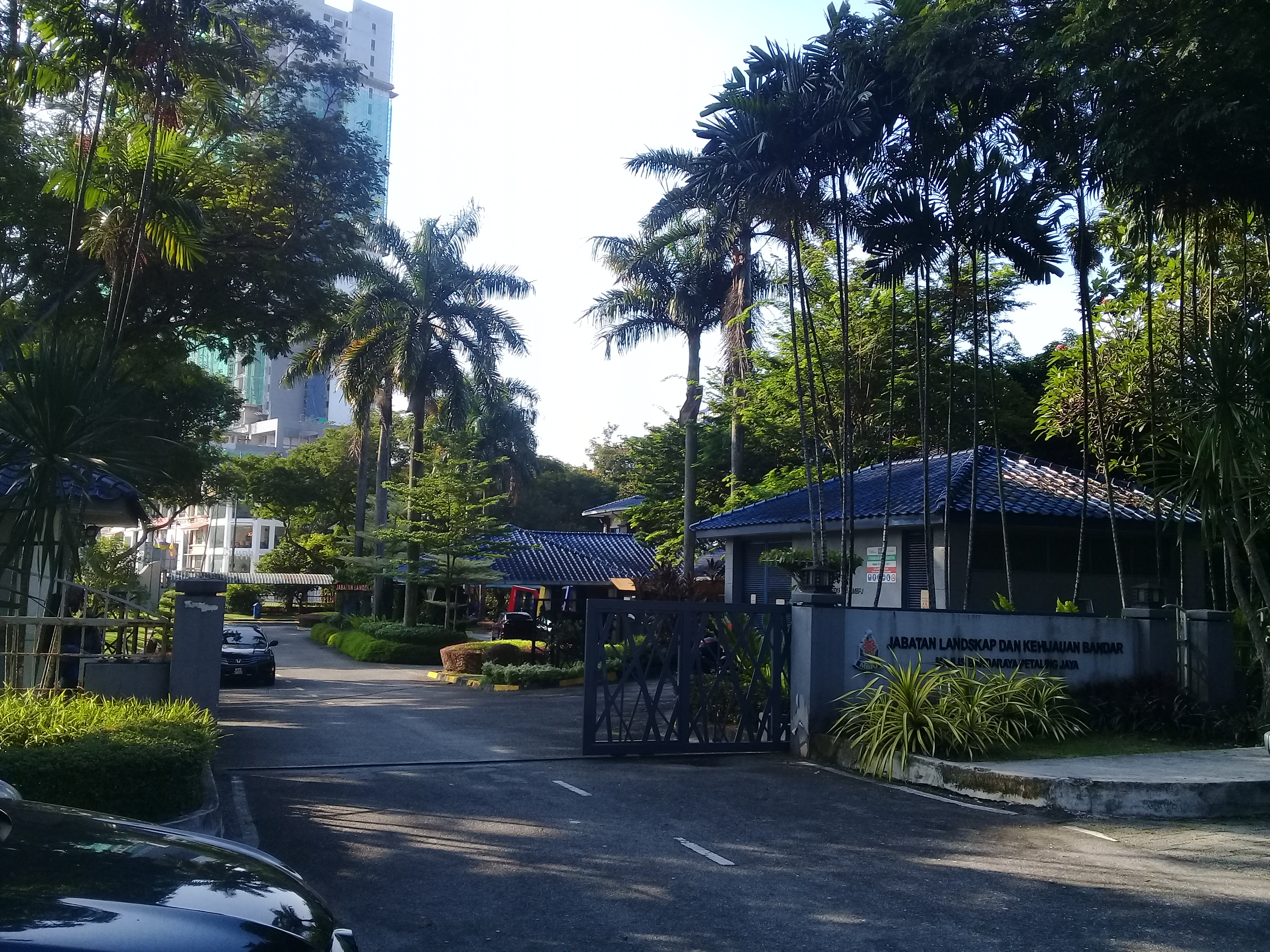
Department of Landscape and Urban Greenery in Kelana Jaya.

Departments	Units
Management Services; Treasury; Valuation & Property Management; Licensing; Enforcement; Building Control; Development Planning; Engineering; Landscape; Health & Environmental Services; Solid Waste & Public Cleaning; Community Development	Corporate Communication; Information Technology; Internal Audit; One Stop Centre; Commissioner of Buildings; Integrity

== City Council Zones ==
The Petaling Jaya City Council is subdivided into twenty-four zones that cover the entire authority. Each zone comprises the different sections of Petaling Jaya.

Zone	Section(s)	Zone	Section(s)	Zone	Section(s)
1	PJU 8 (Damansara Perdana); PJU 9 (Bandar Sri Damansara); PJU 10 (Damansara Damai)	9	Seksyen 17A; Seksyen 19 (Taman Gee Huat); SS 20 (Taman Paramount)	17	PJS 1 (Petaling Utama); PJS 3 (Taman Medan)
2	PJU 6 (Bandar Utama); PJU 7 (Mutiara Damansara); Kampung Sungai Kayu Ara	10	Seksyen 16; Seksyen 17	18	PJS 2 (Kampung Medan); PJS 4 (Taman Medan)
3	PJU 4 (Kwasa Damansara); PJU 5 (Kota Damansara)	11	Seksyen 11; Seksyen 12; Seksyen 13	19	Seksyen 20 (Damansara Kim); Seksyen 21 (Damansara Utama); Seksyen 22 (Damansara Jaya)
4	PJU 1A (Ara Damansara); PJU 2 (Taman Perindustrian Jaya); PJU 3 (Tropicana); Sunway Damansara (Seksyen 12, Seksyen 13 & Seksyen 14)	12	Seksyen 5 (Bukit Gasing); Seksyen 10	20	SS 1 (Kampung Tunku); SS 3 (Taman Subang); SS 9A (Sungei Way)
5	SS 21 (Damansara Utama); SS 22 & 22A (Damansara Jaya)	13	Seksyen 6; Seksyen 7; Seksyen 9 (Taman Jaya); Seksyen 52 (New Town)	21	SS 5 & 6 (Kelana Jaya)
6	SS 23 (Taman Sea); SS 24 (Taman Megah); SS 26 (Taman Mayang Jaya)	14	Seksyen 8; Seksyen 14; Seksyen 51A (Asia Jaya)	22	SS 7 (Kelana Jaya); SS 11 (Kelab Golf Negara Subang)
7	PJU 1 (Dataran Prima); SS 25 (Taman Mayang); SS 4 (Kelana Jaya)	15	Seksyen 2, 3 & 4 (Old Town); Seksyen 51	23	SS 8 & 9 (Sungei Way); SS 10
8	SS 2	16	Seksyen 1 & 1A (Old Town); Seksyen 18	24	PJS 5 (Taman Desaria); PJS 6 (Kampung Lindungan); Minor part of PJS 7 (Bandar Sunway East); PJS 8 (Bandar Sunway); PJS 10 (Bandar Sunway North)

== Former councillors ==
=== 2023 term ===
Zone No.	Member	Party
PKR 11 | DAP 10 | AMANAH 3
1	Suriase Gengiah	PKR
2	Chan Pak Keung	PKR
3	Tang Fuie Koh	PKR
4	Mohd Ikhsan Mohamad Din	PKR
12	Derek John Fernandez	PKR
13	Bryan Ng Yih Miin	PKR
14	Sugumaran Annamalai	PKR
15	Ermeemarianna Saadon	PKR
17	Norah Mansor	PKR
18	Ahmad Akhir Pawan Chik	PKR
21	Rozazitah Binti Ahmad	PKR
5	Quratulain Atiqah Norzahirul Anuar	DAP
6	Sakinah Bibi Nagoor	DAP
7	Leong Chee Cheng	DAP
8	Wong Swee Sang	DAP
9	Yip Sean Yi	DAP
10	Medaline Chang She Yun	DAP
11	N. K Thayalan Krishnasamy	DAP
16	Terence Tan Teck Seng	DAP
19	Nalina Nair Rama Krishan	DAP
20	Ong Yew Thai	DAP
22	Rahibah Che Omar	AMANAH
23	Zamri Mohamad	AMANAH
24	Ridzuan Ahmad@Awang	AMANAH

PKR (11), DAP (10), AMANAH (2), BERSATU (1)

=== 2018–2020 term ===
Zones	Councillor	Party
Zone 1	Suriase Gengiah	PKR
Zone 2	Chan Pak Keung	PKR
Zone 3	Tang Fuie Koh	PKR
Zone 4	Anwar Nekhan	PKR
Zone 12	Derek John Fernandez	PKR
Zone 13	Ong Swee Long	PKR
Zone 14	Sugumaran Annamalai	PKR
Zone 15	Ermeemarianna Saadon	PKR
Zone 17	Ahmad Akhir Pawan Chik	PKR
Zone 18	Raja Fairuz Raja Mazlan	PKR
Zone 21	Puan Rozazitah Binti Ahmad	PKR
Zone 5	Quratulain Atiqah Norzahirul Anuar	DAP
Zone 6	Sakinah Bibi Nagoor	DAP
Zone 7	Leong Chee Cheng	DAP
Zone 8	Wong Swee Sang	DAP
Zone 9	Loyis Uding	DAP
Zone 10	Elaine Magdaline Nathaniel	DAP
Zone 11	N. K Thayalan	DAP
Zone 16	Terence Tan Teck Seng	DAP
Zone 19	Farhan Haziq Mohamed	DAP
Zone 20	Ong Yew Thai	DAP
Zone 22	Rahibah Che Omar	AMANAH
Zone 23	Zamri Mohamad	AMANAH
Zone 24	Mohamad Shakirien Dato’ Abd Razak	PPBM

== Sports ==
- MBPJ FC
