= Mutiara Damansara =

- Town
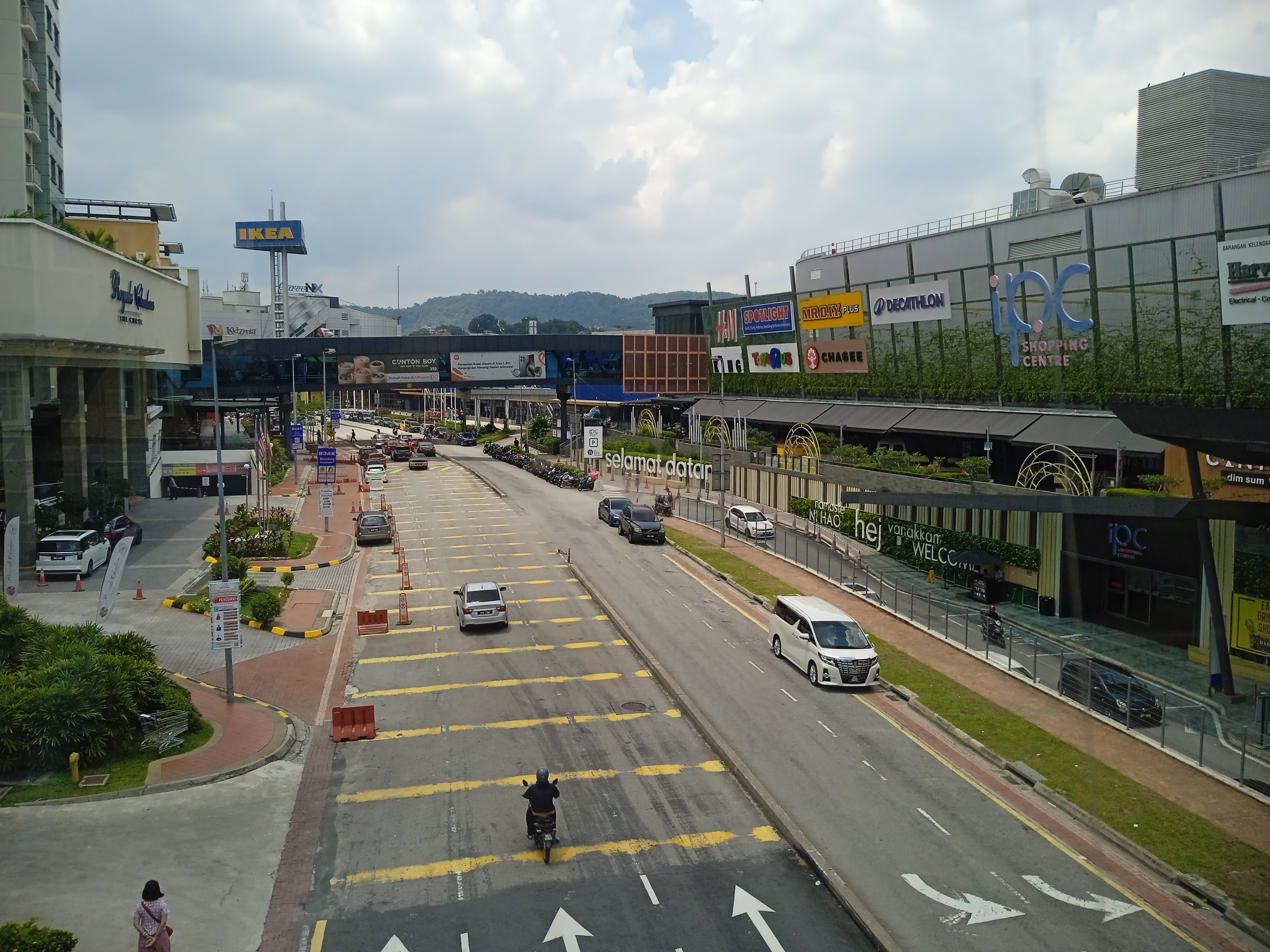

- Flag Seal

- Location within Petaling District and the state of Selangor

- Location in Peninsular Malaysia Mutiara Damansara (Malaysia)
- Coordinates: 3°05′N 101°39′E
- Country: Malaysia
- State: Selangor
- Establishment: 2001

Area
  - Total: 1.38 km^{2} (0.53 sq mi)
- Time zone: UTC+8 (MST)
  - Summer (DST): Not observed
- Website: http://www.mutiara-damansara.com/

Mutiara Damansara is an affluent major township in the northern flank of Petaling Jaya, Selangor, Malaysia.

== Transportation ==
=== Public transportation ===
Mutiara Damansara MRT station is the main railway station serving the township. RapidKL bus route 802 connects Mutiara Damansara to Kelana Jaya LRT station.

=== Car ===
LDP is the main road serving this township. There is a shortcut to Segambut via the SPRINT network's Penchala Link. Besides, drivers also use the North-South Expressway to travel here.

== Shopping centres ==
Mutiara Damansara is home to several shopping centres connected to the Mutiara Damansara MRT station:

- eCurve (closed in 2021; undergoing redevelopment to The Lines Mutiara Damansara)
- IKEA Damansara
- IPC Shopping Centre
- KidZania The Curve NX
- Tesco Extra Mutiara Damansara (Lotus's)
- The Curve (shopping mall)
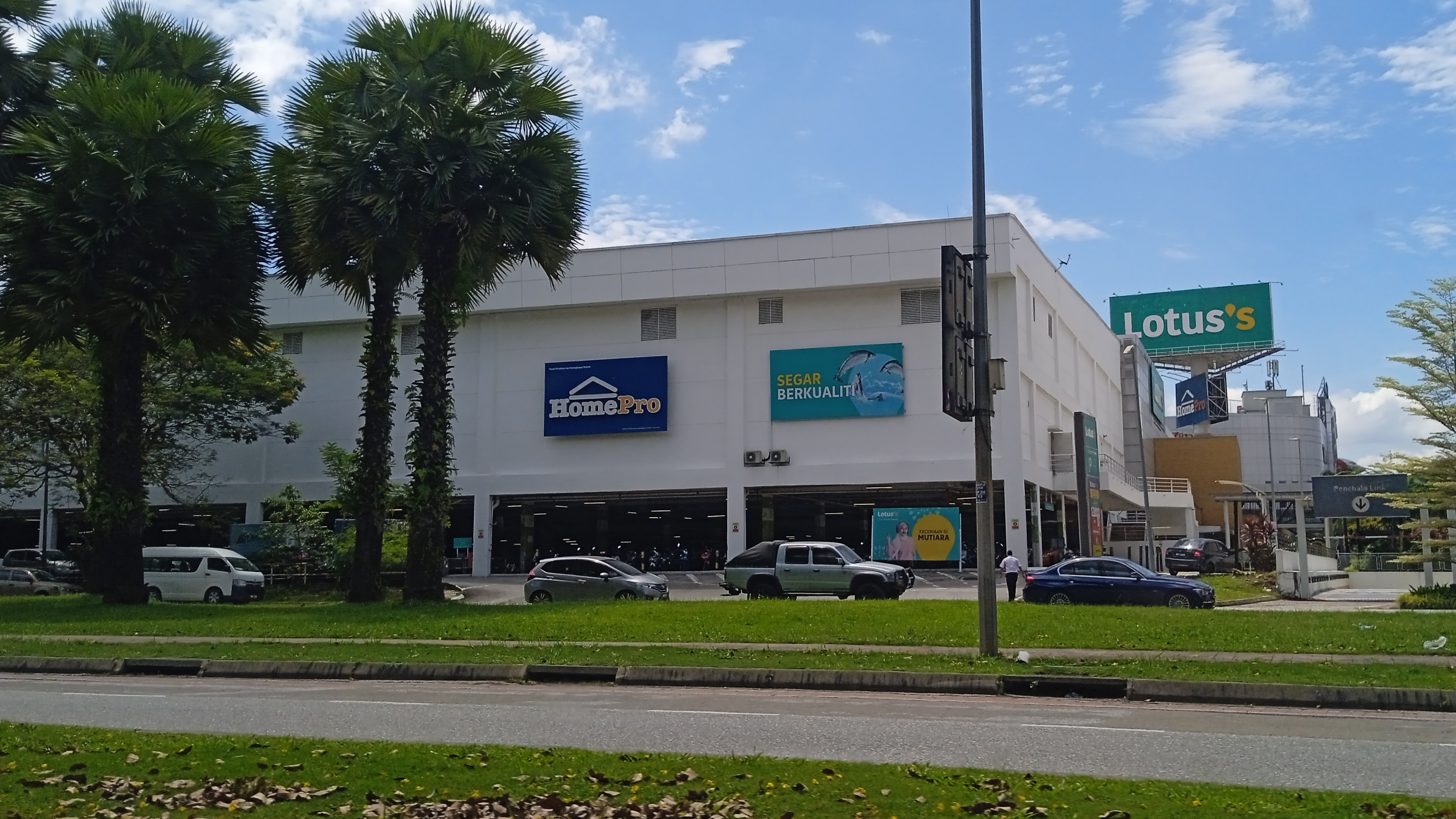
Lotus's Mutiara Damansara in 2023

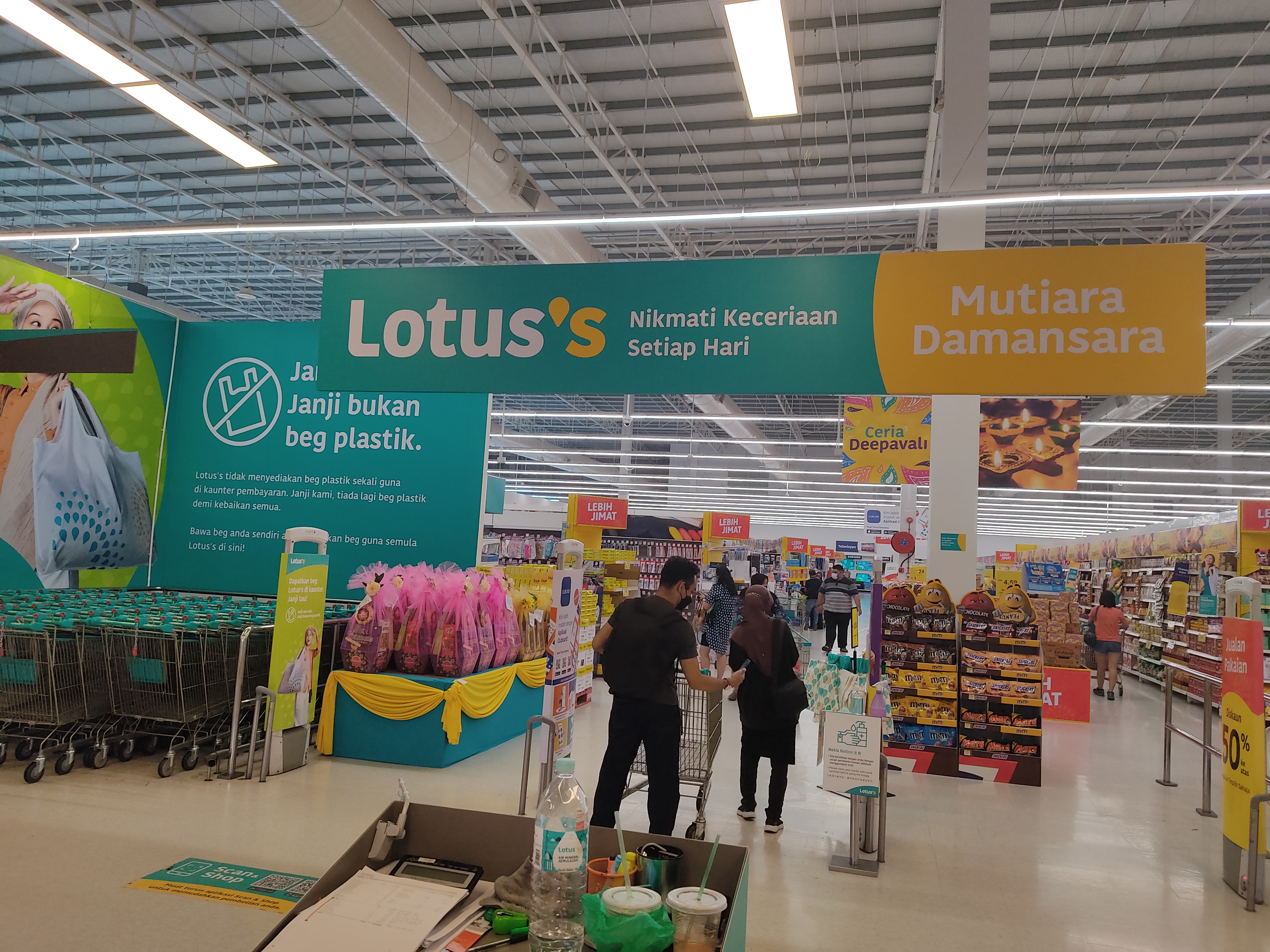
Lotus's in 2021 (interior)

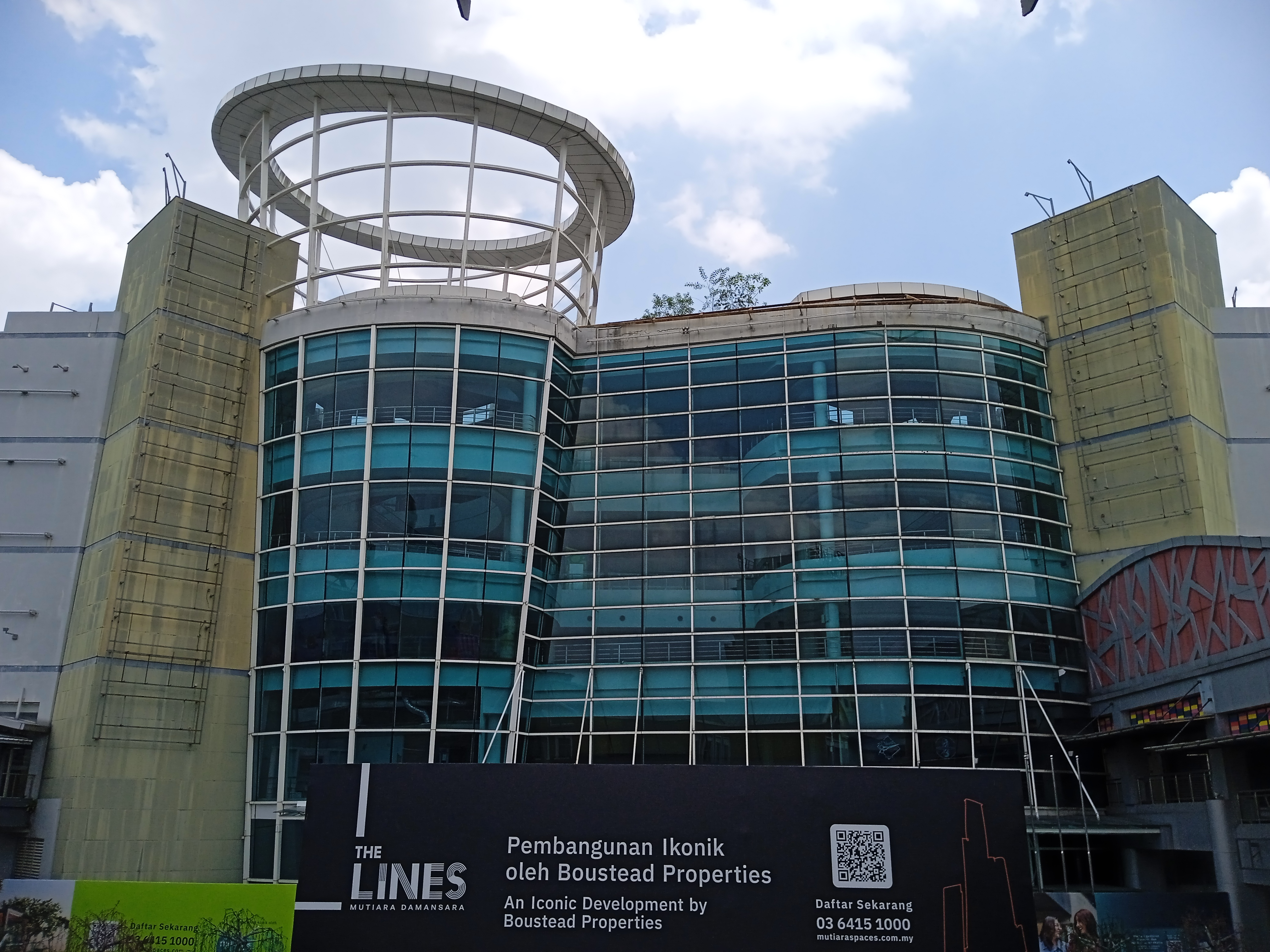
eCurve (closed in 2021; undergoing redevelopment to The Lines Mutiara Damansara)

== See also ==
- Mutiara Rini
