= Lane =

Part of a carriageway meant for a single line of vehicles

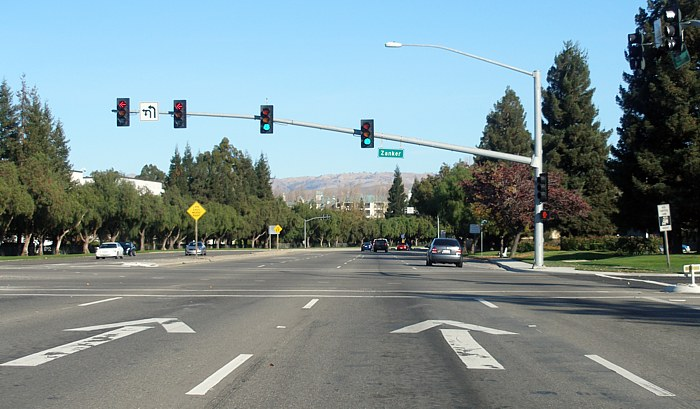
Thru lanes indicated by arrows on California CR G4 (Montague Expressway) in Silicon Valley

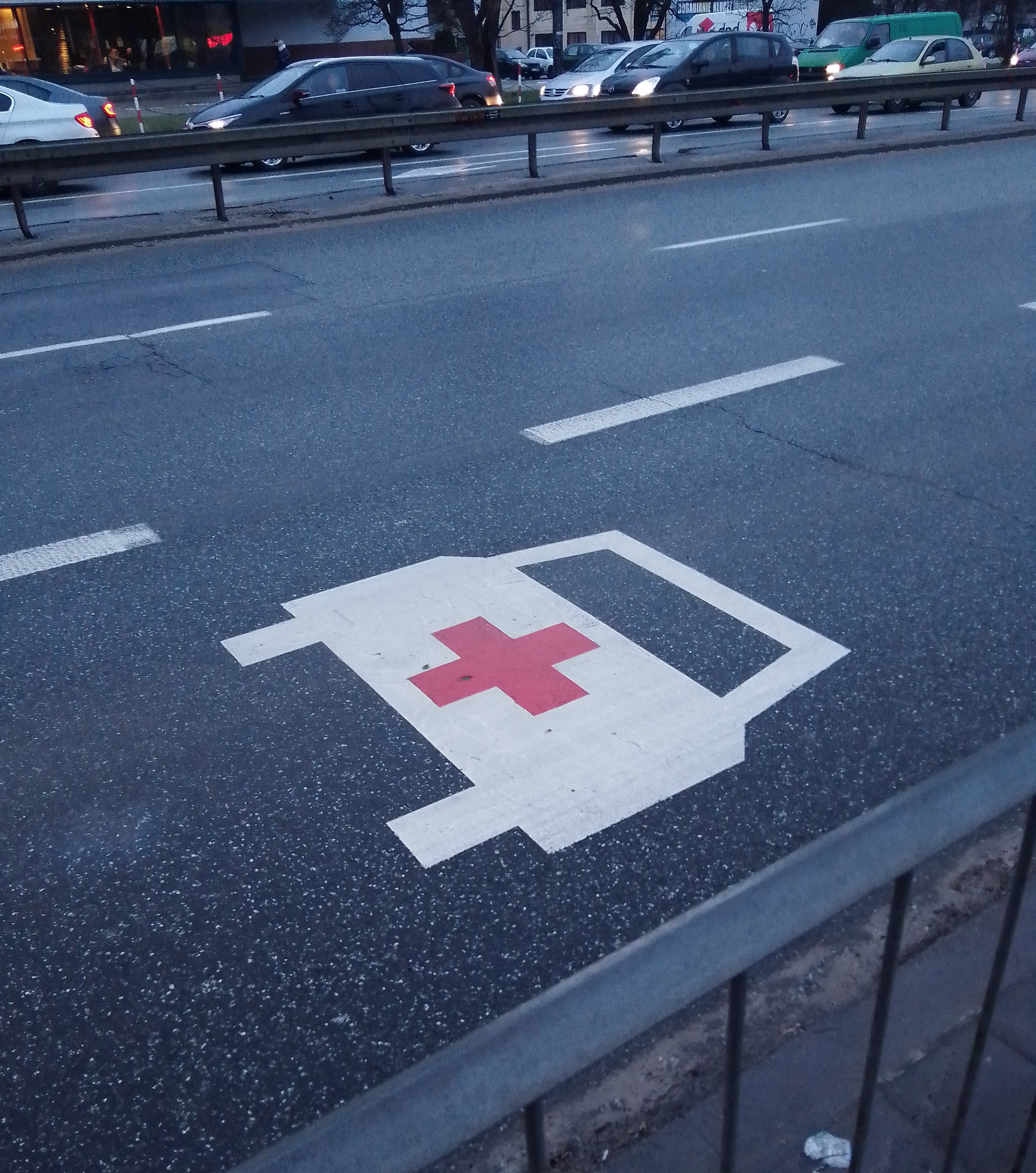
An ambulance lane in Warsaw, Poland

In road transport, a lane is part of a roadway that is designated to be used by a single line of vehicles to control and guide drivers and reduce traffic conflicts. Most public roads (highways) have at least two lanes, one for traffic in each direction, generally separated by lane markings. On multilane roadways and busier two-lane roads, lanes are generally designated with road surface markings. Major highways often have two multi-lane roadways separated by a median.

Some roads and bridges that carry very low volumes of traffic are less than 4.6 metres (15 ft) wide, and are only a single lane wide. Vehicles travelling in opposite directions must slow or stop to pass each other. In rural areas, these are often called country lanes. In urban areas, alleys are often only one lane wide. Urban and suburban one lane roads are often designated for one-way traffic.

== History ==
For much of human history, roads did not need lane markings because most people walked or rode horses at relatively slow speeds. However, when automobiles, trucks, and buses came into widespread use during the first two decades of the 20th century, head-on collisions became more common.

The history of lane markings is connected to early mass automobile construction in Detroit. In 1906, the first Road Commission of Wayne County, Michigan was formed in an effort to make roads safer. (Henry Ford served on the board in the first year.) In 1909, the commission ordered the construction of the first concrete road (Woodard Avenue in Detroit), and conceived the centerline for highways in 1911. Hence, then chairman of the Road Commission, Edward N. Hines, is widely credited as the inventor of lane markings.

The introduction of lane markings as a common standard is connected to June McCarroll, a physician in Indio, California. She began experimenting with painting lines on roads in 1917 after being run off a highway by a truck driver. After years of lobbying by McCarroll and her allies, the state of California officially adopted a policy of painting lines on its highways in November 1924. A portion of Interstate 10 near Indio has been named the Dr. June McCarroll Memorial Freeway in her honor.

The first lane markings in Europe were painted at an accident hotspot in the small town of Sutton Coldfield near Birmingham, England, in 1921. The success of this experiment made its way to other hotspots and led to the standardization of white paint lane markings throughout Great Britain.

The first use in Germany was in Berlin in 1925, where white paint marked both lanes and road edges. When the standard for the new autobahn network was conceived in the 1930s, it mandated the usage of black paint for the center line for each carriageway. Black is more visible on the bright surface of concrete.

By 1939, lane markings had become so popular that they were officially standardized throughout the United States. The concept of lane markings spread throughout the world and became standard for most roads. Originally, lines were drawn manually with ordinary paint which faded quickly. After World War II, the first machines for line markings were invented. Plastic strips became standard in the 1950s. This gradually led to the placement of plastic lane markings on all major roads.

== Types ==
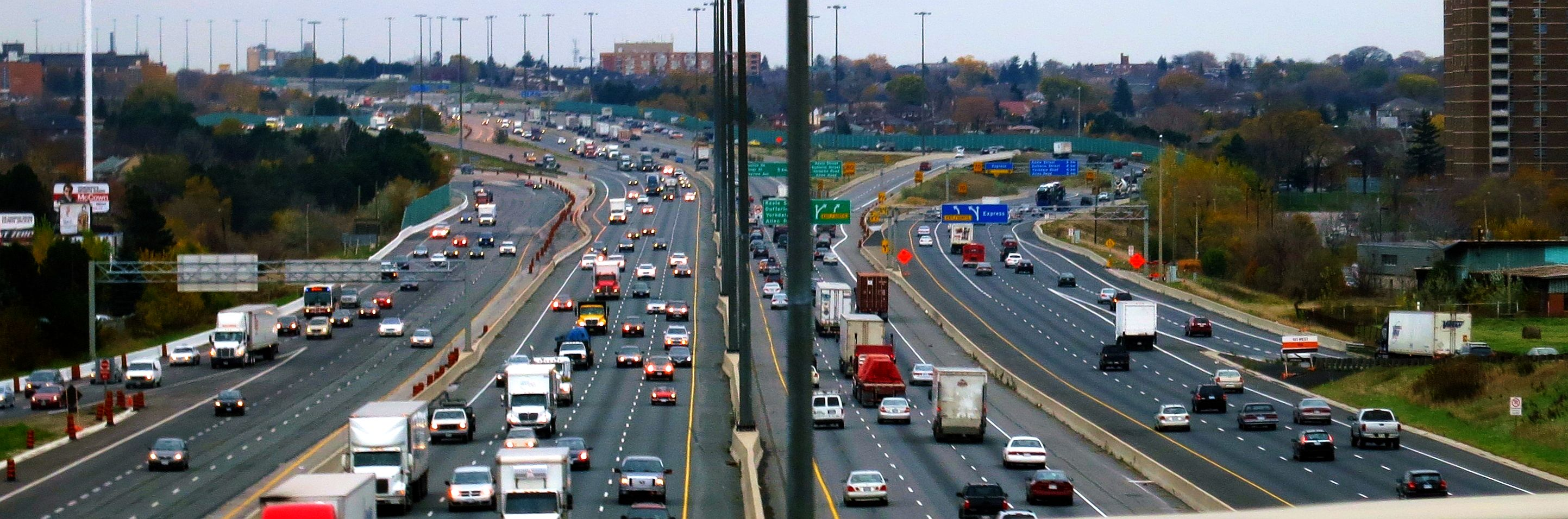
The Ontario Highway 401 in the Greater Toronto area, with 17 travel lanes in 6 separate carriageways visible in the midground

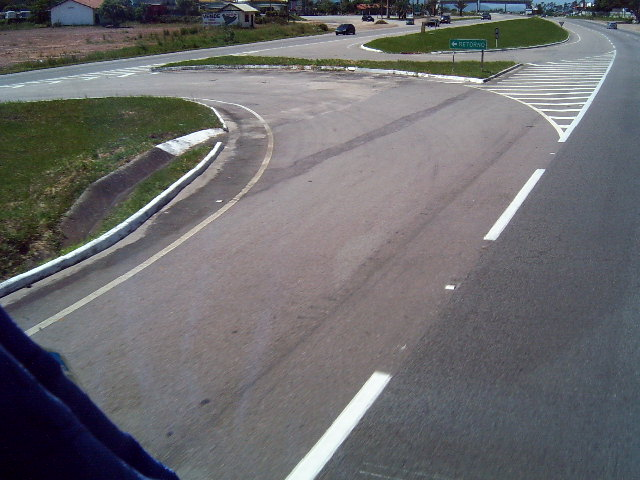
Turning lane on the Rodovia BR-101, Brazil

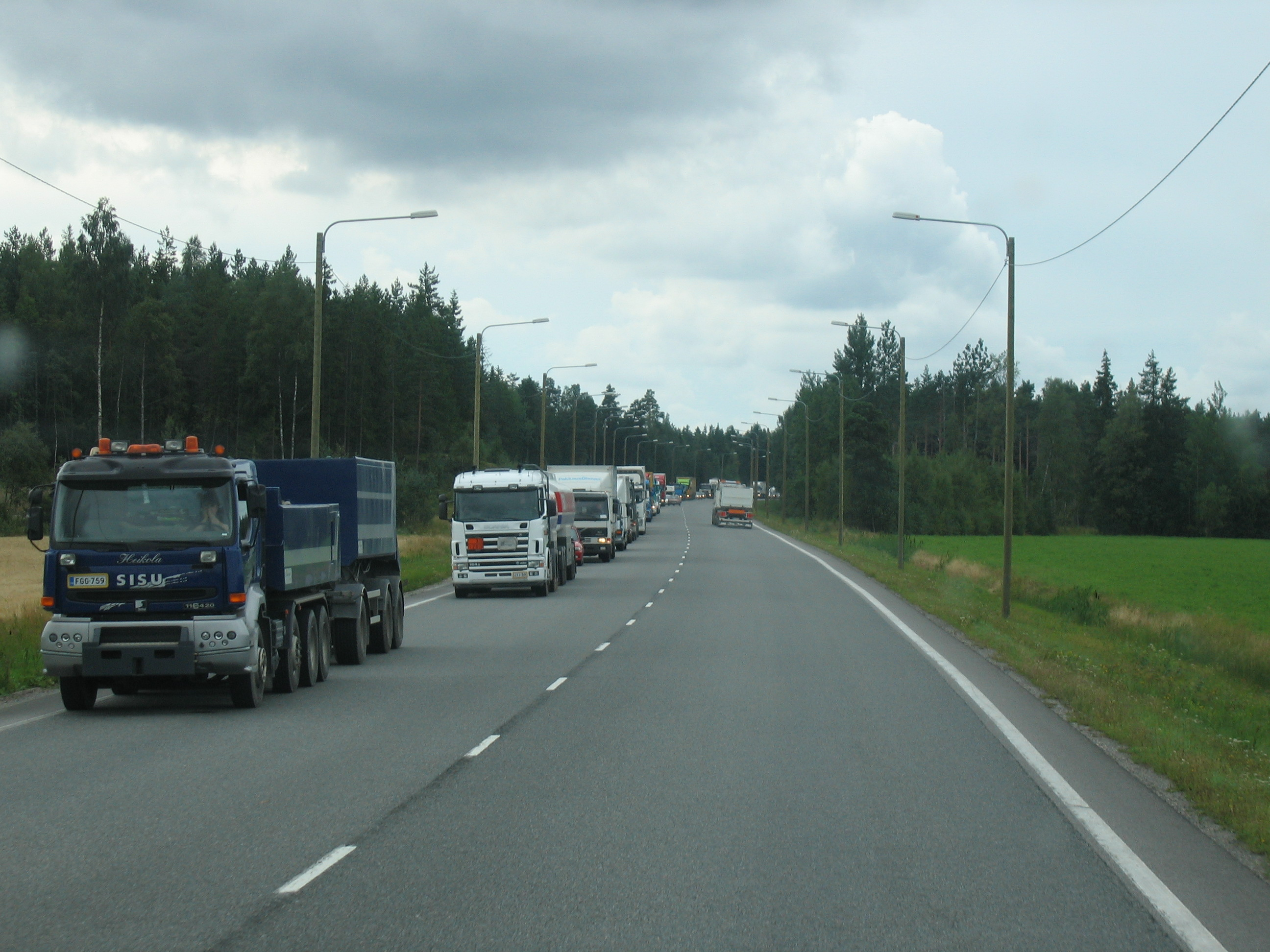
Special, wide two-lane road used at some stretches in Aura, Finland

Changing lanes, Gothenburg, Sweden

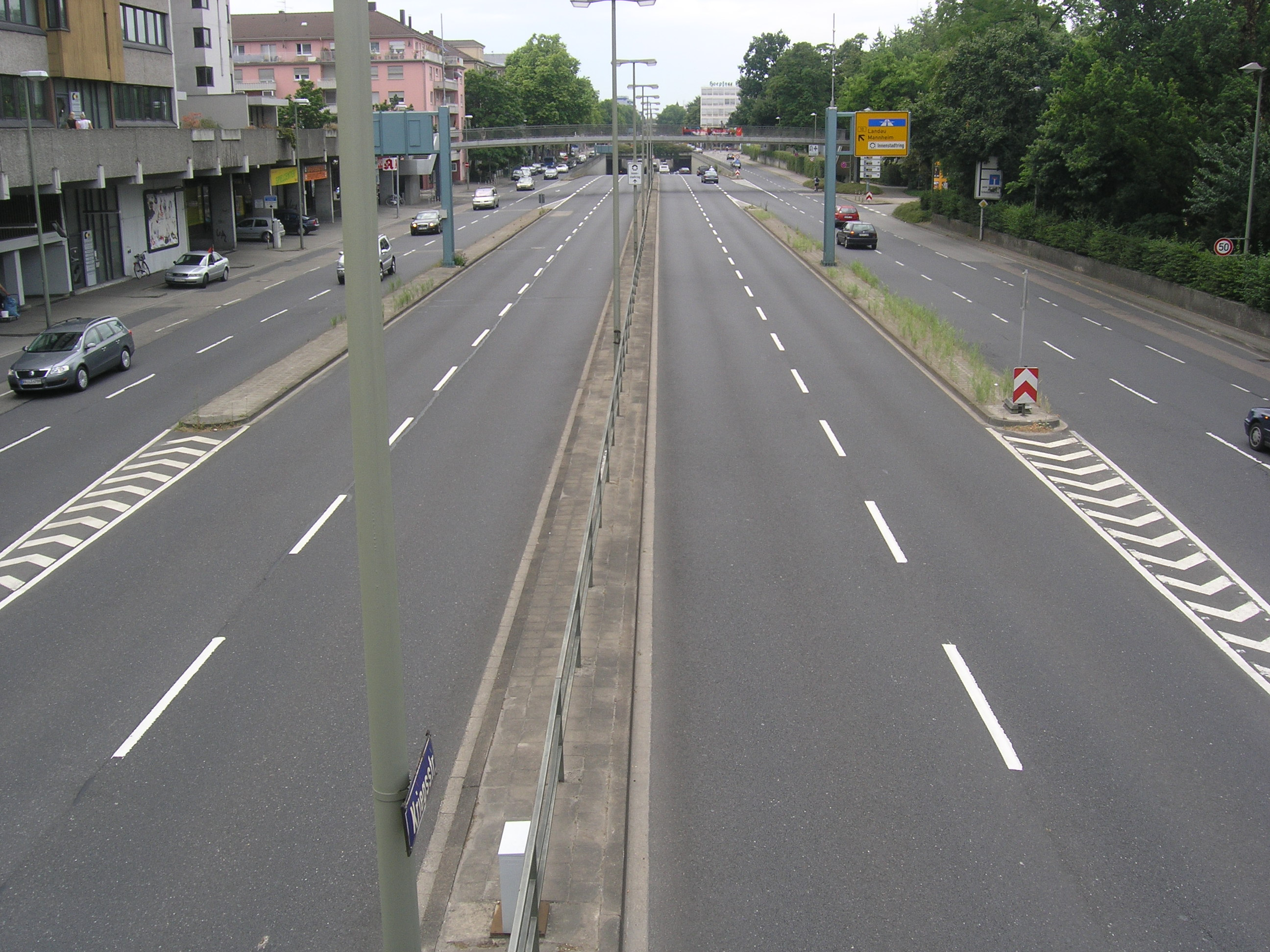
Transfer lanes, connecting surface collector lanes with through lanes between two tunnels

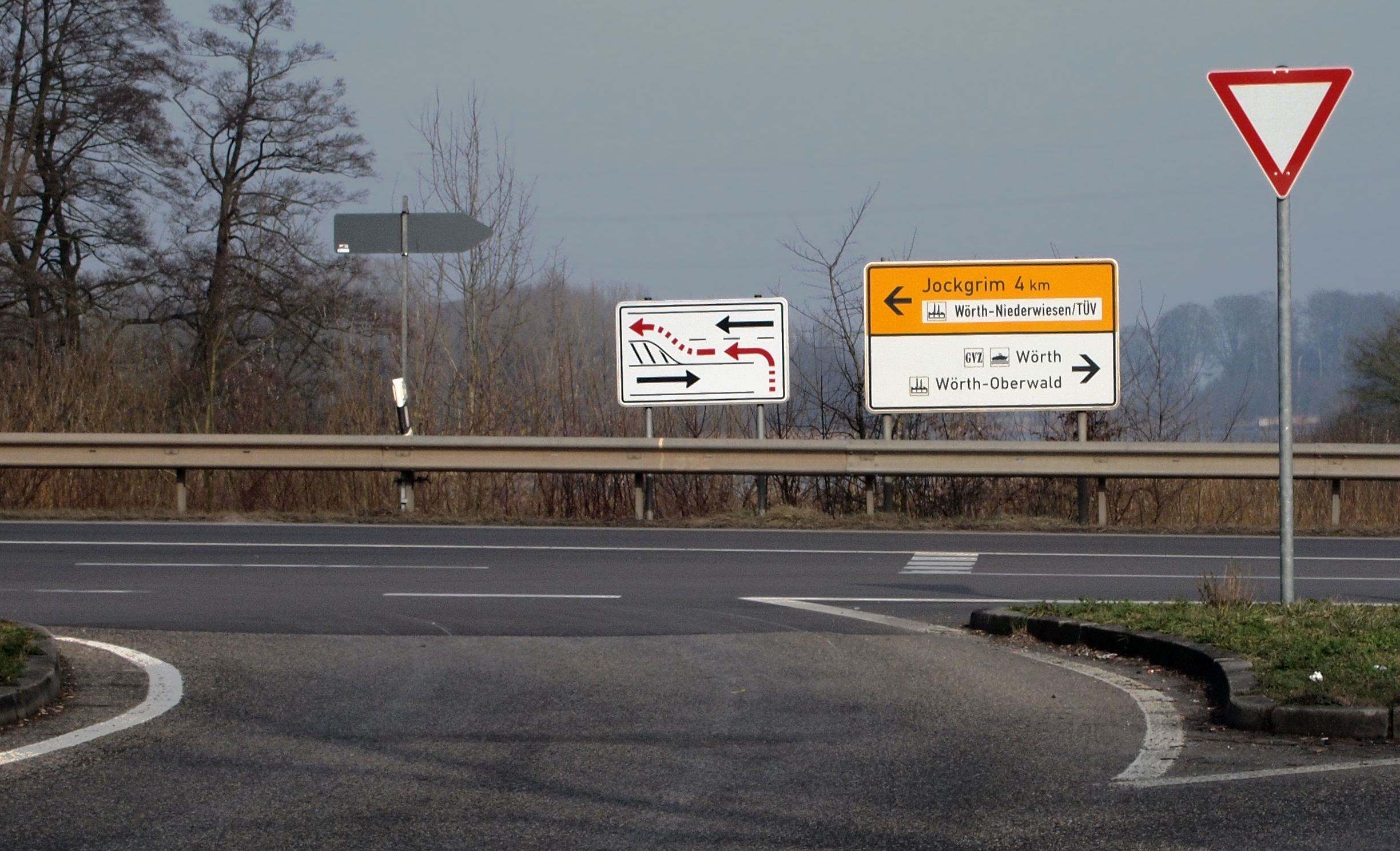
An unusual left-turn merging lane in Germany, explained with signage

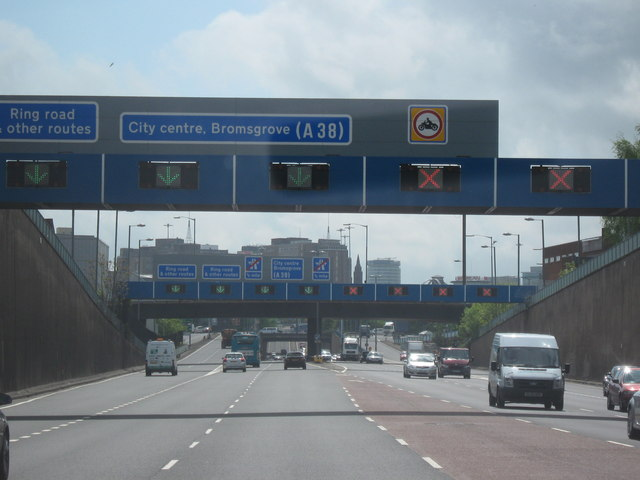
The A38(M) Aston Expressway, showing tidal flow/reversible lanes controlled via overhead gantries, in Aston, Birmingham, England. This motorway has seven lanes, with the one lane always kept as a buffer in the center – in the morning peak time, there are 2 lanes leaving central Birmingham (northbound) and 4 lanes in (southbound). In the evening, there are 4 lanes leaving central Birmingham and 2 lanes coming inwards. At all other times there are three lanes on each side.

=== Basic types ===
- A traffic lane or travel lane is a lane for the movement of vehicles travelling from one destination to another, not including shoulders.
- A through lane or thru lane is a traffic lane for through traffic (traffic continuing on a road or highway). At intersections, these may be indicated by arrows on the pavement pointing straight ahead. In some jurisdictions (Arizona) through lanes require straight directional lanes for at least two or more intersections to qualify as a proper through lane.
- An auxiliary lane is a lane other than a through lane, used to separate entering, exiting or turning traffic from the through traffic.
- An only lane prohibits or requires certain movements, often designated with the word "ONLY" on a sign or roadway, with arrows indicating allowed movements. Most require a specific turning movement, but some require straight-ahead travel or allow two out of three possible movements (such as turning right or going straight ahead). It can thus be either a through lane or a turn lane.
- A two-way center turn lane allows drivers travelling in either direction to stop before turning across oncoming traffic, safely waiting for a gap without blocking through traffic and risking a rear-end collision. Drivers are expected to check for oncoming traffic before entering.

=== Passing lanes ===
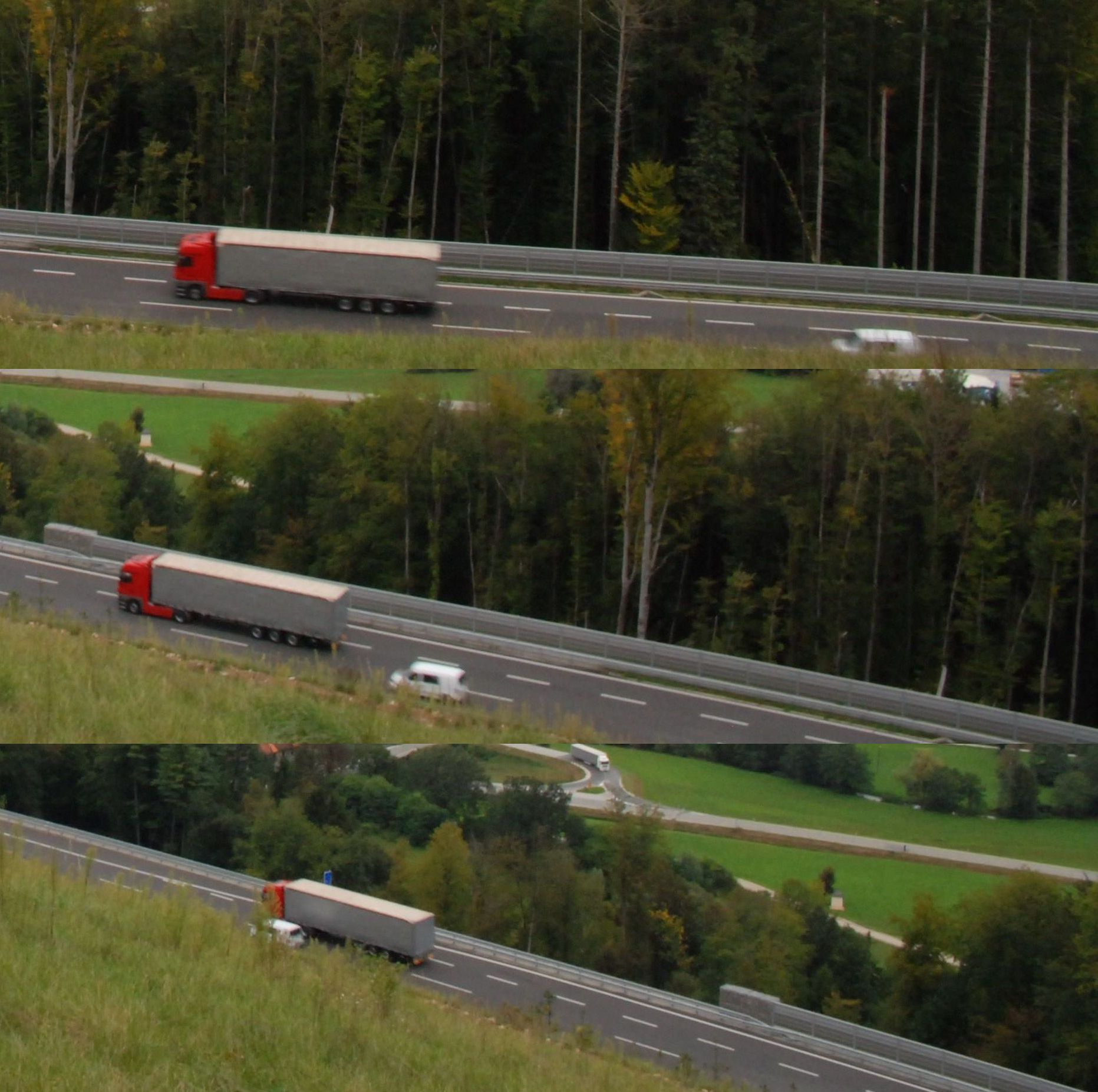
A car passes a slower moving truck, using a passing lane on the A2 motorway in Slovenia

A passing lane (North American English), overtaking lane (English outside North America) is a lane on a multi-lane highway or motorway closest to the median of the road (the central reservation) used for passing vehicles in other lanes. (North American usage also calls the higher-speed lane nearest the median the "inside lane" but in the United Kingdom this is the "outside lane".) Countries with right-hand traffic put the passing lane on the left; those with left-hand traffic put the passing lane on the right. Motorways typically have passing lanes along their entire length, but other roads might only have passing lanes for certain segments, depending on design specifications typically related to available space, funding, and traffic levels. A 2+1 road alternates the passing lane between directions every few kilometers/miles.

The passing lane is commonly referred to as the fast lane, and the lane closest to the shoulder the slow lane. Some jurisdictions, particularly on limited-access roads, ban passing-lane driving while not overtaking another vehicle; others merely require slower cars to yield to quicker traffic by shifting to slower lanes, or have no limitations.

On roads with only one lane in a given direction, overtaking is accomplished by briefly pulling into oncoming traffic. This is often prohibited by "no passing" signs and road markings on lengths of road where a hill or a curving road limit sight distances, and some jurisdictions ban this entirely. So-called suicide lanes provide a shared third center lane for passing in both directions, with the expectation that drivers will check for oncoming traffic before entering.

=== Climbing lanes ===
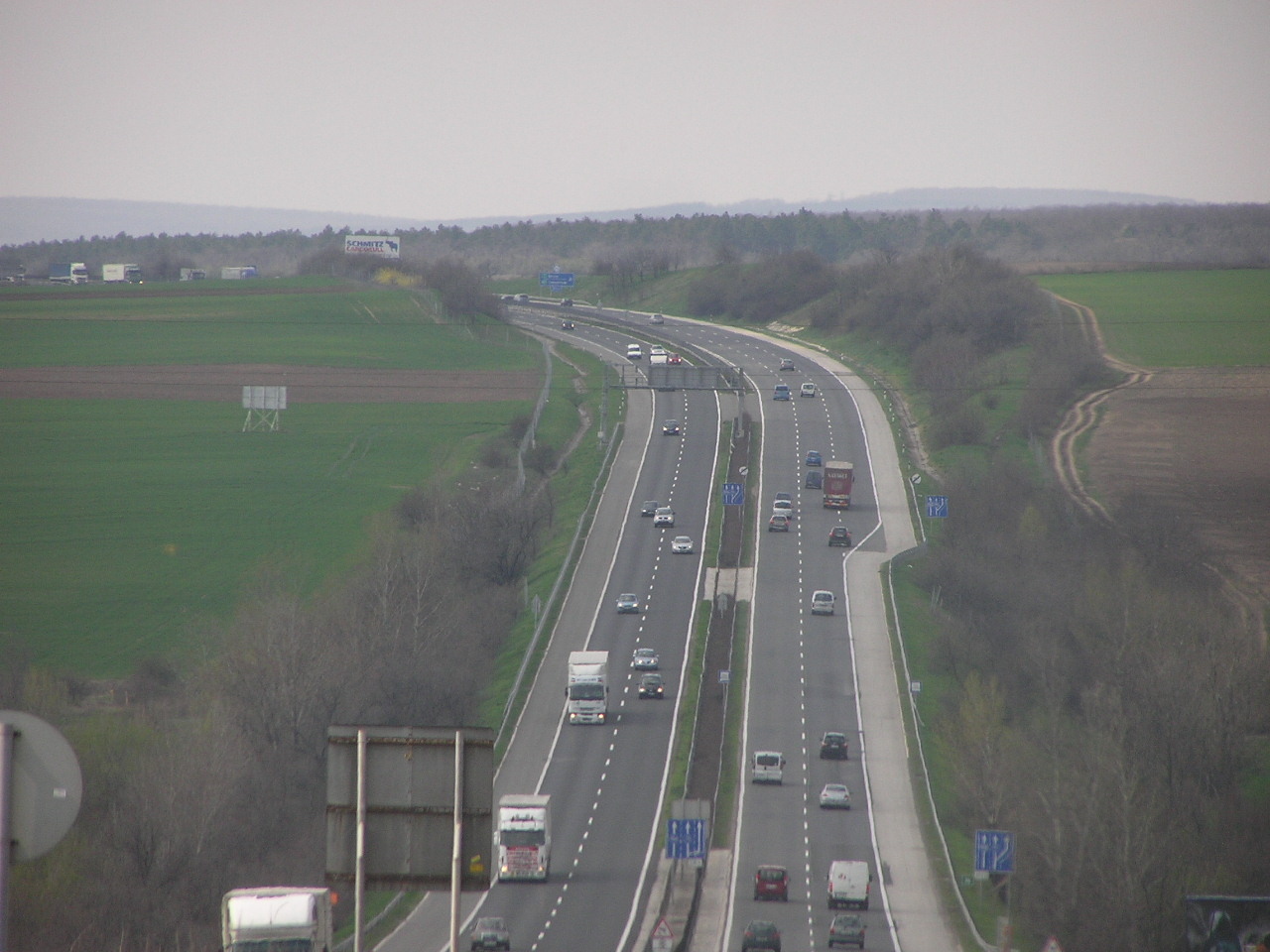
Climbing lane in Hungary; centre of image - right hand lane

A climbing lane, crawler lane (UK), or truck lane, is an additional roadway lane that allows heavy or underpowered vehicles to ascend a steep grade without slowing other traffic. They are typically used by large trucks or semi-trailer trucks, which go uphill more slowly than they travel on level ground. They are often used on major routes such as motorways and interstate highways.

=== Physically separated lanes ===
Some high-volume limited-access highways use a local–express lane system. This physically separates express lanes for long-distance travel (closer to the median) from local lanes which have access to more frequent exits and entrances. Express lanes may have their own shoulders for safety, and sometimes dedicated entrance and exit ramps. (The term "express lane" is also used for HOV and toll lanes, which may or may not be physically separated.)

A frontage road is a similar arrangement, were one or more lanes are physically separated from a higher-speed road in order to provide safe and frequent access to local homes and businesses.

=== Entering and exiting ===
- Dedicated turn lanes can be used to allow through traffic to avoid waiting for turning traffic at intersections, at the expense of increased roadway width for pedestrians to hazard. Some turn lanes have signals that prevent turns when pedestrians or bicycles are allowed to proceed. On high-speed roads, turn lanes can improve safety by providing a separate lane for traffic that needs to slow down.
- A slip lane (UK: filter lane) allows vehicles to bypass an intersection and take an unsignalized turn when crossing traffic is not required (for example a right-hand turn for right-hand traffic). Yielding to traffic on the cross street is typically required.
- An acceleration lane or merge lane allows traffic entering a highway to accelerate to the speed of through traffic before merging with it.
- A deceleration lane is a lane adjacent to the primary road or street used to improve traffic safety by allowing drivers to pull out of the through lane and decelerate before turning off a surface street or exiting a highway or motorway.
- An operational lane or auxiliary lane combines an acceleration and deceleration lane, running the entire length between an entrance and exit. The lane is created when an entrance ramp meets the highway, and drops out (with an "exit only" sign) to become the ramp at the next exit.

=== Non-travel lanes ===
In some areas, the lane adjacent to the curb is reserved for non-moving vehicles.

- A parking lane is reserved for parallel parking of vehicles.
- A fire lane is the area next to a curb, which is reserved for firefighting equipment, ambulances, or other emergency vehicles. Parking in these areas, often marked by red lines, is usually prohibited.
- A loading lane (loading zone in the United States) is an area next to a curb, which is reserved for loading and unloading passengers or freight. It may be marked by a sign ("LOADING ONLY" or "LOADING ZONE") or by a yellow or white-painted curb.
- A hard shoulder is sometimes called an emergency lane or a breakdown lane, when it is reserved for vehicle breakdowns, and for emergency vehicles. On some roads, the shoulder is used as a vehicle lane during peak travel hours. "Hard" refers to the fact that the shoulder is paved, not "soft" dirt.

=== Managed lanes ===
A reversible lane (contraflow lane) is a lane where the direction of traffic can be changed to match the peak flow. They are usually used where there are periods of high traffic, especially rush hour where the traffic is predominantly in one direction, and on roads that may be geographically constrained, such as over bridges. One or more lanes are removed from the opposing flow and added to the peak flow – this technique is known as tidal flow.

Dedicated lanes are traffic lanes set aside for particular types of vehicles:

- A high occupancy vehicle, 2+ lane or carpool lane is reserved for carpooling. In the UK, such lanes are not extremely common, although they do exist in many places—they are usually marked "2+ LANE", referring to the fact that cars with two or more occupants may drive in the lane. In the US, they may be marked with a diamond icon every few hundred feet (hence the nickname "diamond lane"), or separated from other lanes by double broken white lines, a continuous pair of double yellow lines, or just a single broken white line.
- A high-occupancy toll lane is a combination of an HOV lane and toll collection technology that allows drivers without passengers to use the HOV lane by paying a premium price for the privilege
- A designated bicycle lane is a portion of the roadway or shoulder designated for the exclusive or preferential use of bicyclists. This designation is indicated by special word or symbol markings on the pavement and "BIKE LANE" signs.
- A motorcycle lane is provided at certain roads and highways such as the Federal Highway in Malaysia to segregate the motorcycle traffic from the main roadways to reduce motorcycle-related accidents. The motorcycle lane may form a part of the hard shoulder, or may be one or more completely separated lanes.
- A bus lane is reserved for buses providing public transportation on a fixed route, sometimes with overhead catenary for trolleybuses. In some countries, such as in the UK when signposted, bus lanes may also be used by some other traffic, such as taxis, bicycles and motorbikes.
- A tram lane is a lane reserved for the use of buses, trams and taxicabs. It is usually encountered in cities with curbside tram network, such as Zagreb.
- A truckway is a dedicated lane for longer length trucks; for instance, the Florida Turnpike allows 96-foot long double trailer combinations, in contrast to normal Florida highways' 53-foot limit. Compare to crawler lane above. Since the major cost of trucking is the fixed cost of the same trailer with its driver the cost per ton of operating with truckway size and weight allowances is 35 to 40 percent below the cost of operations on the non-truckways.
- A haul road only has lanes intended for freight traffic, and non-commercial traffic may be prohibited.

Some jurisdictions generally prohibit trucks from faster lanes on motorways, or from the express lanes in an express-local system. Some lanes have restrictions based on vehicle weight, for example to prevent overloading certain parts of a bridge. A small number of jurisdictions have truck-only lanes, intended to increase reliability of freight deliveries. Different lanes can also have different height restrictions, depending on the shape of overpasses.

== Lane width ==
Assumed widths and heights in road design (in meters)

The widths of vehicle lanes typically vary from 2.7 to 4.6 m (9 to 15 ft). Lane widths are commonly narrower on low volume roads and wider on higher volume roads. The lane width depends on the assumed maximum vehicle width, with an additional space to allow for lateral motion of the vehicle.

In the United States, the maximum truck width had been 8 ft (2.4 m) in the Code of Federal Regulations of 1956, which exactly matched then standard shipping container width. The maximum truck width was increased in 1976 to 102 in (2.59 m) to harmonize with the slightly larger metric 2.6 m (102.4 in) world standard width. The same applies to standards in Europe, which increased the allowable width of road vehicles to a current maximum of 2.55 m (100.4 in) for most trucks, and 2.6 m (102.4 in) for refrigerator trucks. These widths do not include side mirrors, but only the vehicle body. The minimum extra space had been 0.20 m (7.9 in) and it is currently assumed to be at least 0.25 m (9.8 in) on each side. The international standard allows roads with less traffic to add a second or third lower width lane in the same direction for cars 1.75 m (69 in) – those that have been built exclude trucks from these narrower lanes; however lower width lanes are not a recommended design principle for new roads, as it could be dangerous if traffic becomes heavier in future.

In the United States, the Interstate Highway standards for the Interstate Highway System use a 12 ft (3.7 m) standard lane width, while narrower lanes are used on lower classification roads. In Europe, laws and road widths vary by country; the minimum widths of lanes are generally between 2.5 to 3.25 m (8.2 to 10.7 ft). The federal Bundesstraße interurban network in Germany defines a minimum of 3.5 m (140 in) for each lane for the smallest two lane roads, with an additional 0.25 m (9.8 in) on the outer sides and shoulders being at least 1.5 m (59 in) on each side. A modern Autobahn divided highway with two lanes per direction has lanes 3.75 m (12.3 ft) wide with an additional clearance of 0.50 m (20 in) on each side; with three lanes per direction this becomes 3.75 m (12.3 ft) for the rightmost lane and 3.5 m (11 ft) for the other lanes. Urban access roads and roads in low-density areas may have lanes as narrow as 2.50 m (8.2 ft) in width per lane, occasionally with shoulders roughly 1 m (39 in) wide.

=== Extra lane width in horizontal curves ===
Depending on speed, road curvature and vehicle properties, heavy goods vehicle (HGV) combinations are prone to "high speed outside offtracking". This means that the rearmost axle of the trailer does not follow the lateral path of the truck tractor unit, but may travel significantly—up to 1–3 meters (3.3–9.8 ft)—away from the curve center. Hence, narrow lanes on sharp curves have to be designed slightly wider than on straight roads. This effect is much greater on slippery snow-covered roads than on bare asphalt or cement concrete, calling for even larger lane widening.

=== Effects of lane width ===
In urban settings both narrow (less than 2.8 m (9.2 ft)) and wide (over 3.1–3.2 m (10–10 ft) lanes increase crash risks. Wider lanes (over 3.3–3.4 m (11–11 ft) are associated with 33% higher impact speeds, as well as higher crash rates.

Carrying capacity is also maximal at a width of 3.0 to 3.1 metres (9.8 to 10.2 ft), both for motor traffic and for bicycles. Pedestrian volume declines as lanes widen, and intersections with narrower lanes provide the highest capacity for bicycles. As lane width decreases, traffic speed diminishes.

Narrow lanes cost less to build and maintain. They lessen the time needed to walk across, and reduce stormwater runoff.

== Lane markings ==
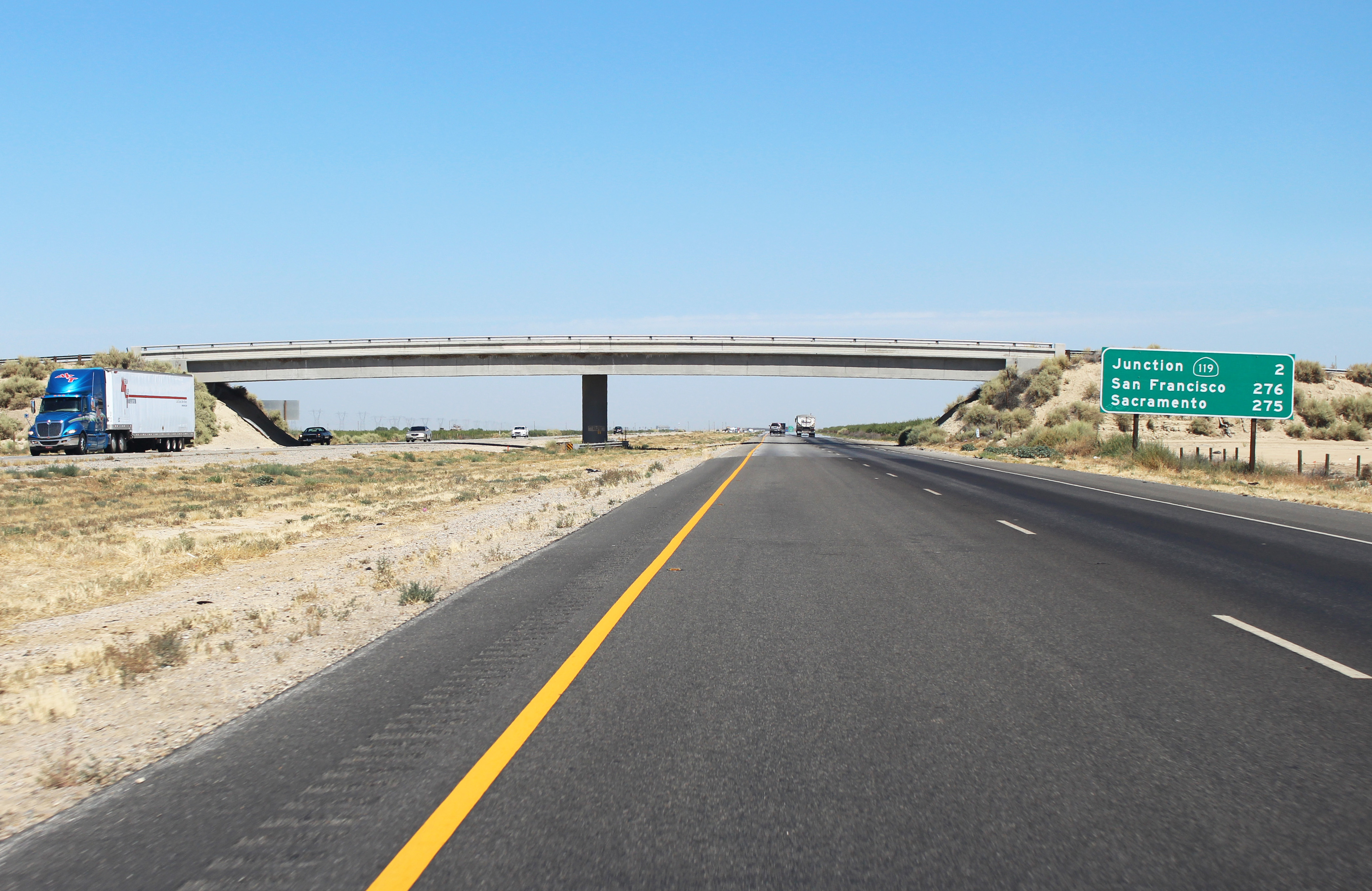
A typical rural American freeway (Interstate 5 in the Central Valley of California). The yellow line is on the left, the dashed white line in the middle, and the solid white line on the right. The rumble strip is to the left of the yellow line.

Painted lane markings, which designate a single line of vehicles for movement within traffic, vary widely from country to country. In the United States, Canada, Mexico, Honduras, Puerto Rico, Virgin Islands and Norway, yellow lines separate traffic going in opposite directions and white separates lanes of traffic traveling in the same direction; but that is not the case in many European countries.

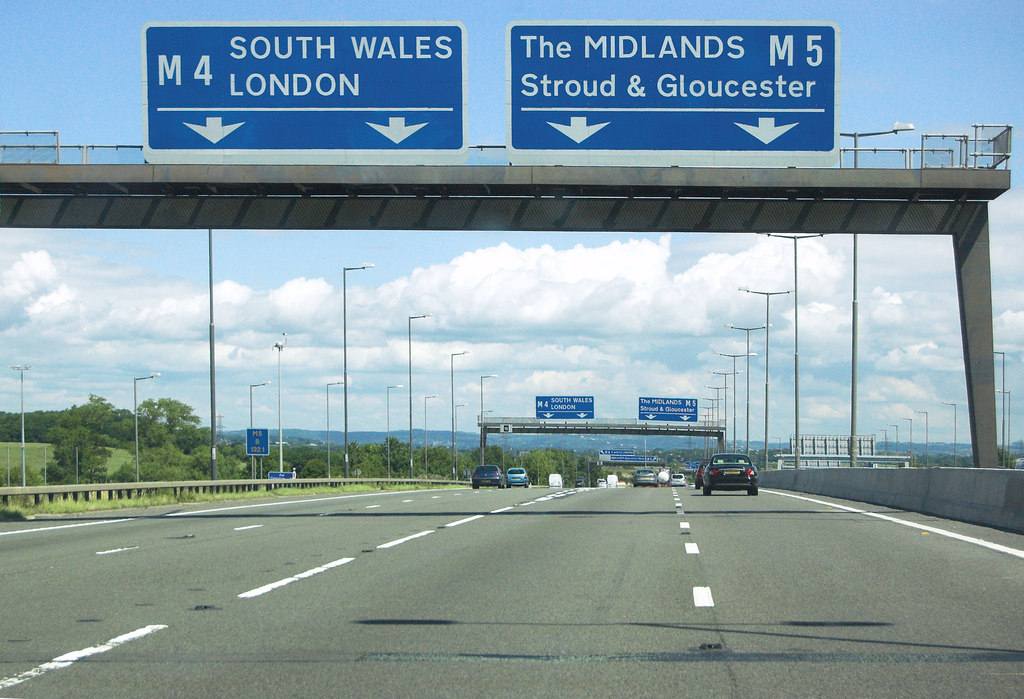
Lanes on the M5 in Britain.

Lane markings are mostly lines painted on the road by a road marking machine, which can adjust the marking widths according to the lane type.

== Lane numbering ==
Traffic reports in California often refer to accidents being "in the number X lane." The California Department of Transportation (Caltrans) assigns the numbers from left to right. The far left passing lane is the number 1 lane. The number of the slow lane (closest to freeway onramps/offramps) depends on the total number of lanes, and could be anywhere from 2 to 8.

However, in the UK, "lane 1" is the "slow lane" (left-hand lane).

== Capacity ==
Lane capacity varies widely due to conditions such as neighboring lanes, lane width, elements next to the road, number of driveways, presence of parking, speed limits, number of heavy vehicles and so on – the range can be as low as 1000 passenger cars / hour to as high as 4800 passenger cars / hour but mostly falls between 1500 and 2400 passenger cars / hour.

== See also ==
- Country lane
- Green lane (road)
- Lane departure warning system
- Lane splitting
- Left- and right-hand traffic
- Road surface
- Road surface marking
- Road marking machine
- Shoulder (road)
