= Petaling Jaya Inner Ring Road =

Road in Malaysia

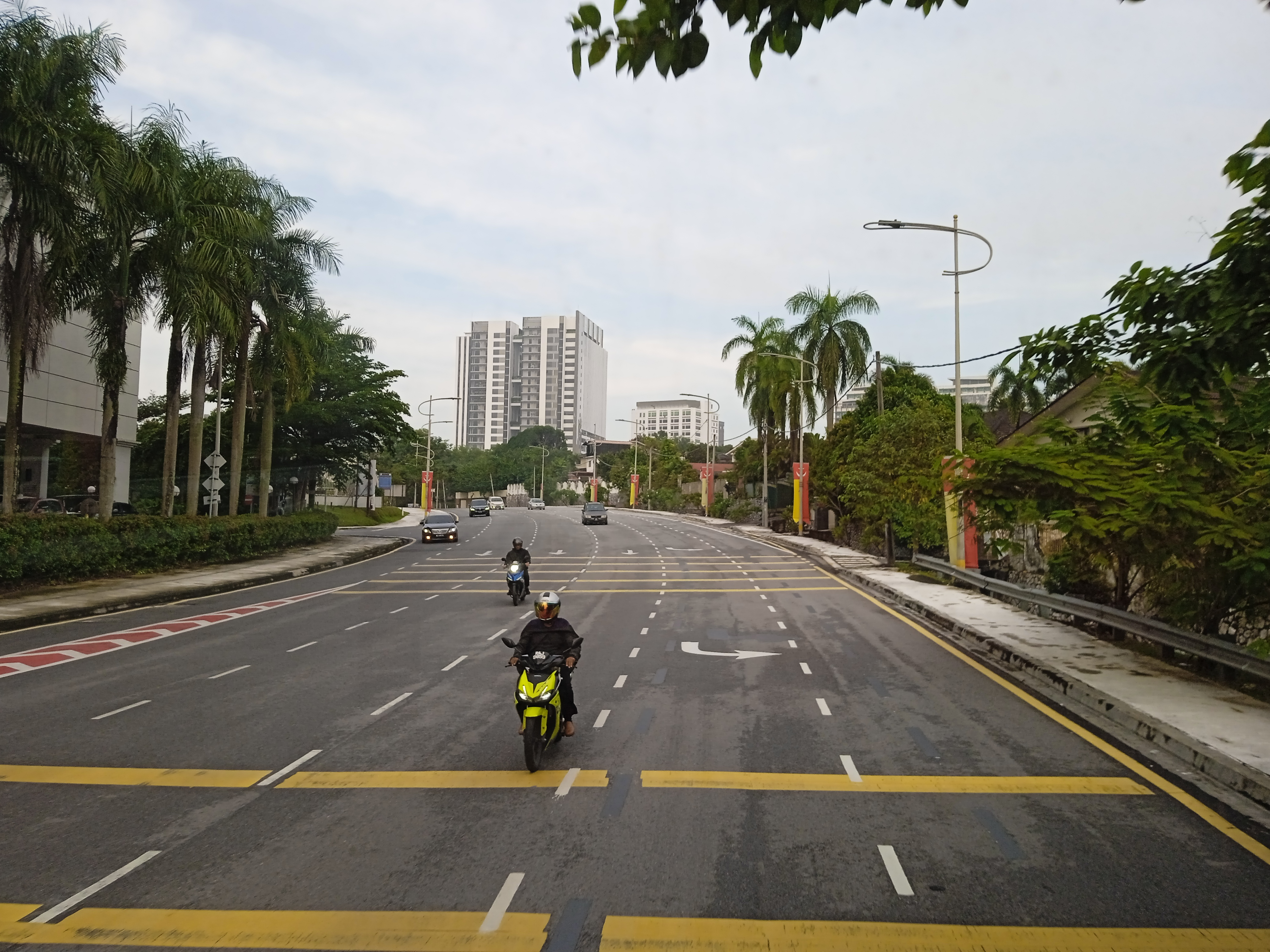

Route information
- Existed: 1960s–present
- History: Completed in the 1960s

Major junctions
- Beltway around Petaling Jaya inner city centre area
- South end: Jalan Sultan roundabout
- Jalan Sultan; Jalan Selangor
- South end: Jalan Sultan roundabout

Location
- Country: Malaysia
- Primary destinations: Petaling Jaya New Town (Section 52)

Highway system
- Highways in Malaysia; Expressways; Federal; State

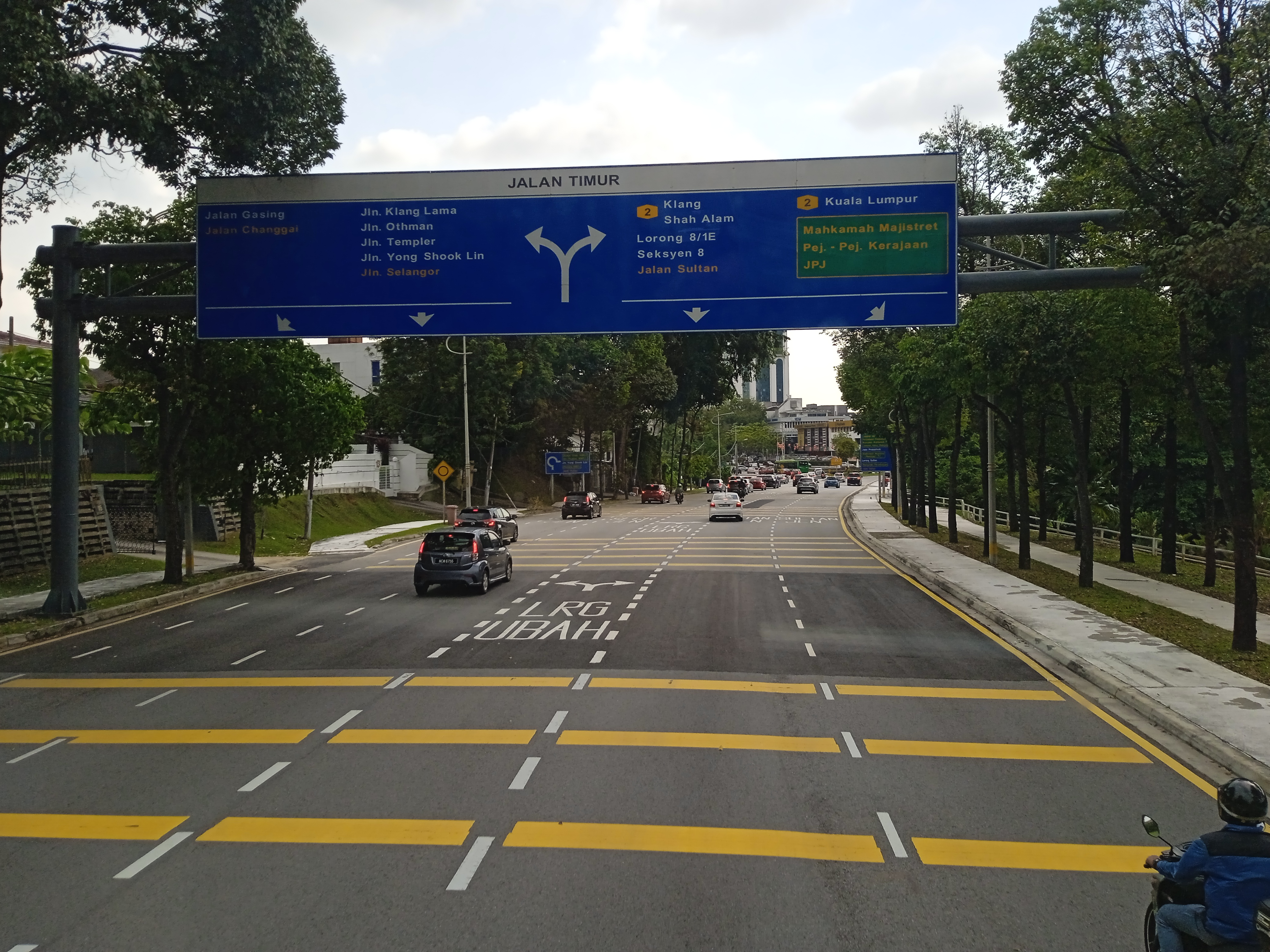
Jalan Timur

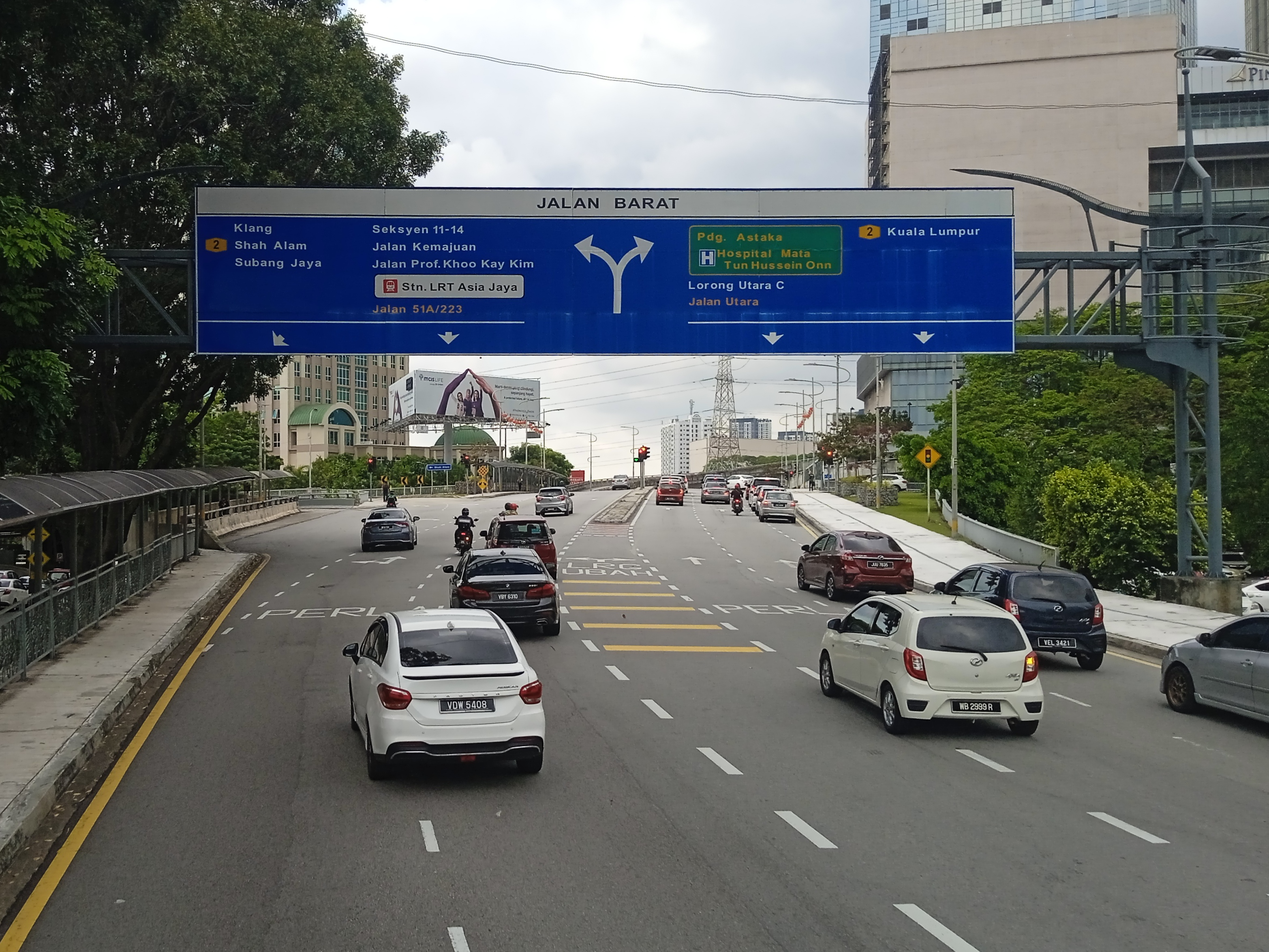
Jalan Barat

Petaling Jaya Inner Ring Road (PJIRR) is an urban and municipal thoroughfare ring road in Petaling Jaya, Selangor, Malaysia, consisting of Jalan Sultan, Jalan Barat, Jalan Utara and Jalan Timur.

== Landmarks ==
- Wisma Persekutuan Petaling Jaya (Petaling Jaya Federal Building)
- Menara PKNS
- Wisma MCIS Zurich
- Stamford College
- Hilton Petaling Jaya
- Asia Jaya
- Tun Hussein Onn National Eye Hospital
- Luther Centre
- FINAS (formerly known as Filem Negara Malaysia)
- Crystal Crown Hotel Petaling Jaya
- TNB Building Petaling Jaya

== List of junctions ==
km	Exit	Junctions	To	Remarks
		Jalan Sultan Roundabout	East; Jalan Changgai 6/2; Jalan Gasing; Section—until -- South; Jalan Selangor; Jalan Templer; Section—until --	Roundabout
		Lorong Sultan	North; Lorong Sultan; Emporium Makan PJ; Kelab Syabas; Shah's Motel; A&W PJ Drive-Thru	T-junctions
		Jalan Produktiviti	North; Jalan Produktiviti	T-junctions
		Jalan Tengah	South; Jalan Tengah; PJ New Town (City Centre)	T-junctions
		Wisma Persekutuan Petaling Jaya (Petaling Jaya Federal Building)		
		Jalan Yong Shook Lin Junctions	South; Jalan Yong Shook Lin; Jalan Selangor	T-junctions
		Jalan Penchala Junctions	Southwest; Jalan Penchala; Jalan Templer; Section—until --	T-junctions
		Persiaran Barat	Northwest; Persiaran Barat; Nestle Malaysia headquarters Hotel Singgahsana	T-junctions
		Wisma MCIS Zurich		
		Lorong 8/1e	West; Lorong 8/1e Wisma Thrifty	T-junctions
		Stamford College		
		Hilton Petaling Jaya		
		Jalan Barat-federal Highway Interchange	FT 2 Federal Highway West; Subang Jaya; Shah Alam; Klang EAST; Kuala Lumpur; Bangsar	Diamond interchange
		Jalan 51a/223	West; Jalan 51a/223 Menara Axis; Crystal Plaza; P&R Asia Jaya LRT station 5	T-junctions
		Asia Jaya	East; Lorong Utara C Asia Jaya; Hotel Armada Petaling Jaya	T-junctions
		P&R Asia Jaya LRT station	P&R Asia Jaya LRT station 5	
		Lorong Utara 52/C	East; Lorong Utara 52/C	T-junctions
		Safety Driving Centre		
		Lorong Utara B	East; Lorong Utara B Padang Astaka; Tun Hussein Onn National Eye Hospital; Deutsche Schule of Kuala Lumpur (DSKL) (German School of Kuala Lumpur)	T-junctions
		Luther Centre		
		Lorong 14/4C	Northwest; Lorong 14/4C	T-junctions
		Jalan Semangat Junctions	Northwest; Jalan Semangat; Jalan Kemajuan; Jalan Harapan; Section 13 until --	T-junctions
		SMK (L) Bukit Bintang		
		Jalan 12/15	North; Jalan 12/15	T-junctions
		FINAS (formerly known as Filem Negara Malaysia)		
		Jalan 12/19	North; Jalan 12/19	T-junctions
		Lorong Utara 52/A	South; Lorong Utara 52/A; Bangunan Sultan Salahuddin Abdul Aziz Shah	T-junctions
		Crystal Crown Hotel Petaling Jaya		
		Jalan Bukit Junctions	Northeast; Jalan Bukit 11/2; Jalan Universiti; Section 11 until 12; University Malaya; University Malaya Medical Centre (UMMC)	T-junctions
		Jalan 11/3	Northeast; Jalan 11/3	T-junctions
		Lorong Utara	West; Lorong Utara	T-junctions
		Lorong Utara Kecil	West; Lorong Utara Kecil; Padang Astaka; Anglican Church	T-junctions
		Jalan Timur-federal Highway Interchange	FT 2 Federal Highway West; Subang Jaya; Shah Alam; Klang East; Kuala Lumpur; Bangsar	Diamond interchange
		Taman Jaya	East; Lorong Timur; Taman Jaya	T-junctions
		TNB Building Petaling Jaya		
		Persiaran Barat	West; Persiaran Barat; AmCorp Mall; P&R Taman Jaya LRT station 5 Dataran Petaling Jaya	T-junctions
		Lorong Timur	East; Lorong Timur	T-junctions
		Jalan Pantai 9/7	East; Jalan Pantai 9/7	T-junctions
		Emporium Makan PJ		
		Jalan Sultan Roundabout	East; Jalan Changgai 6/2; Jalan Gasing; Section—until -- South; Jalan Selangor; Jalan Templer; Section—until --	Roundabout
