= Kota Darul Ehsan =

Arch on the border of Kuala Lumpur and Selangor in Malaysia

Coordinates: 3°6′44.2″N 101°39′23.65″E

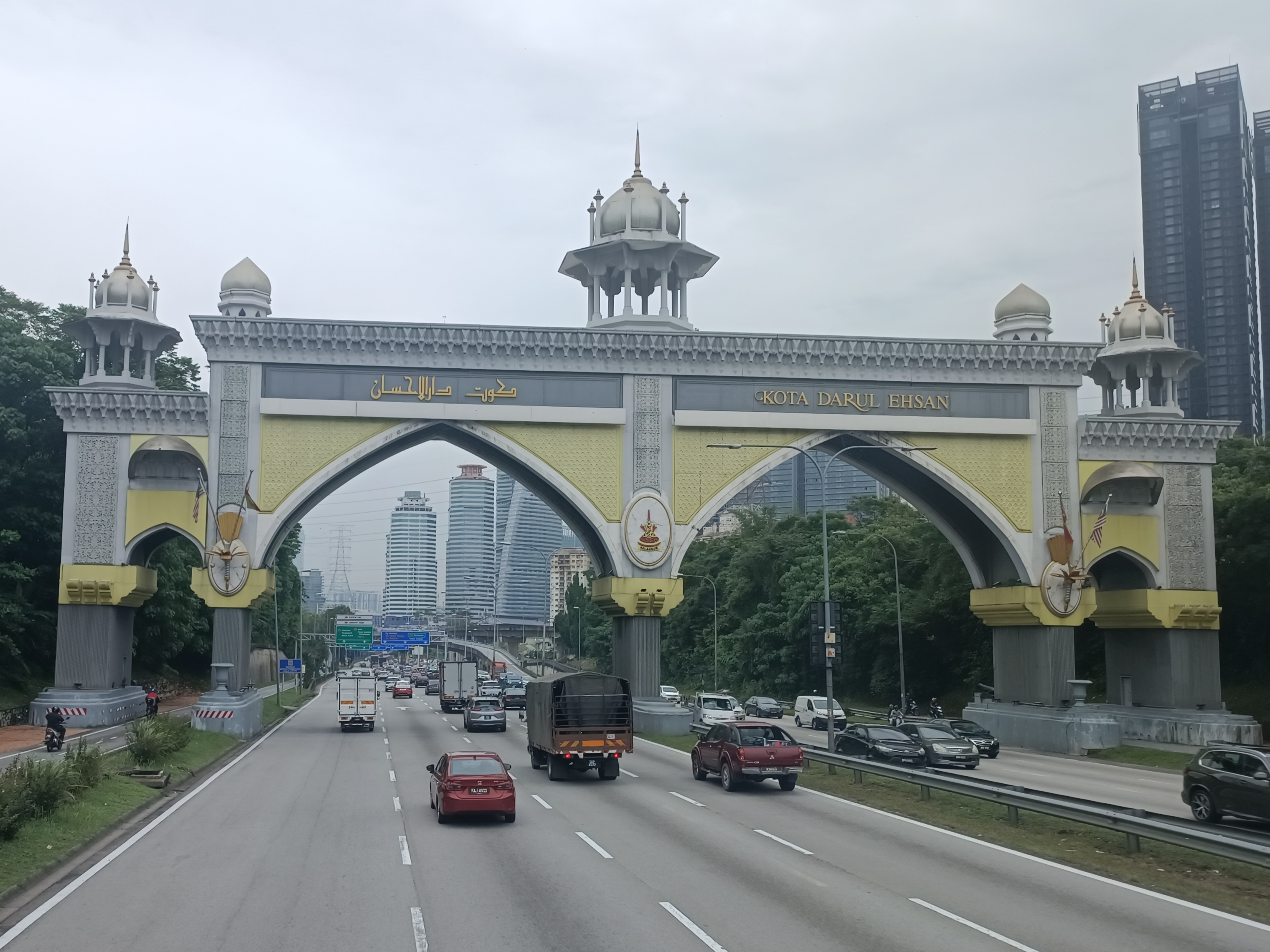
- The new Kota Darul Ehsan arch.
- Interactive map of the Kota Darul Ehsan area

General information
- Architectural style: Moorish architecture
- Location: Federal Route 2 Federal Highway
- Construction started: 1979
- Completed: 1981

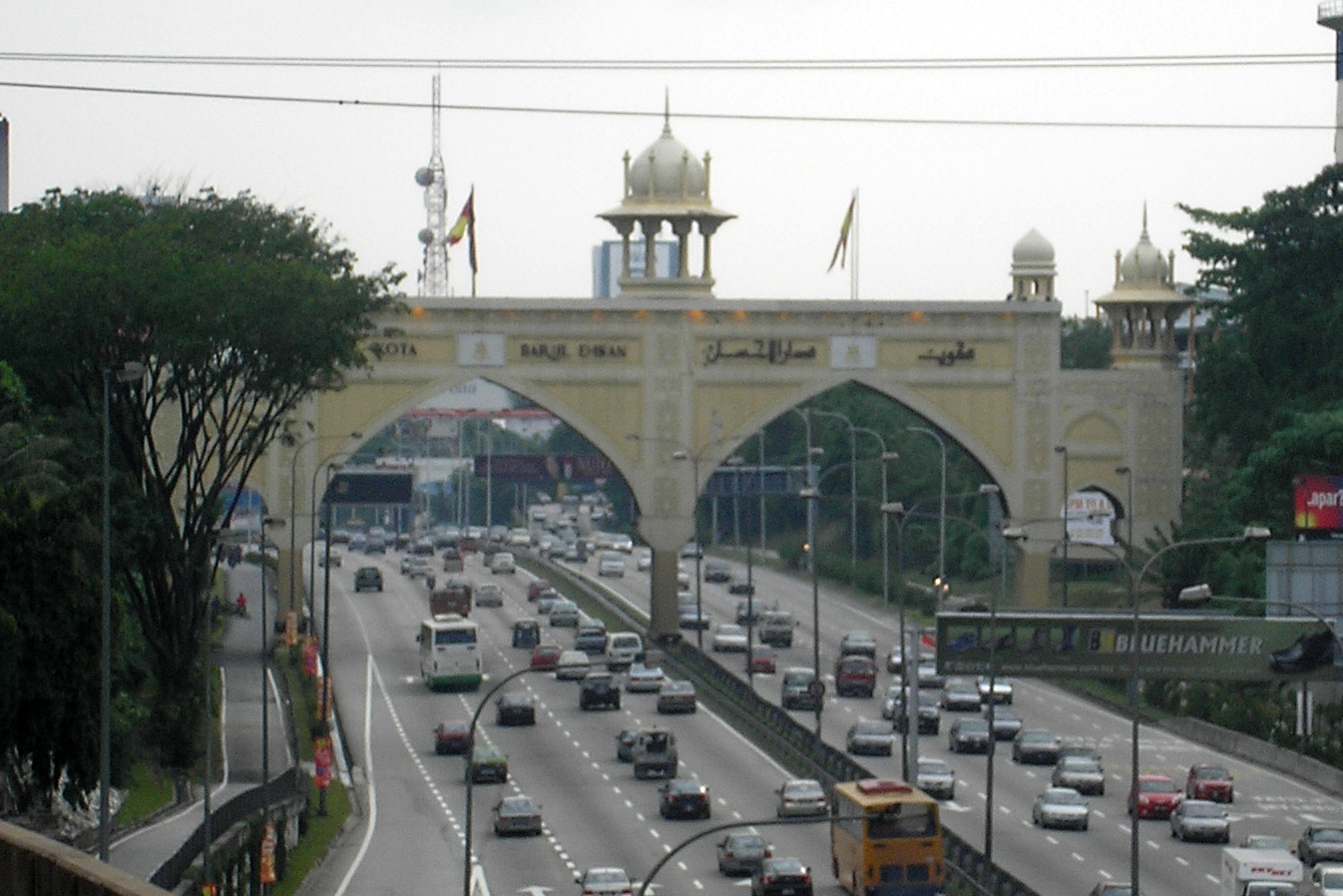
The Kota Darul Ehsan arch (Old design) over the Federal Highway, as seen from KJ19 Universiti LRT Station.

Kota Darul Ehsan is a row of arches symbolizing the border on Malaysian Federal Highway between the Federal Territory of Kuala Lumpur and Malaysian state of Selangor. Erected on Federal Route 2, it is the biggest arch in Malaysia.

== History ==
As a commemoration of the cession of Kuala Lumpur to the federal government to form a Federal Territory by Selangor, the building of the arch was commissioned by the late Sultan of Selangor, Almarhum Sultan Salahuddin Abdul Aziz Shah on 1 February 1974. This arch symbolises the sacrifice of the Selangor state to the federal government. This arch was completed on 1981 and was officially opened by the late Almarhum Sultan Salahuddin Abdul Aziz of Selangor on 3 January 1982.

== Architecture ==
The arch's design incorporates influences from Moorish architecture, and shares a similar design with the Kuala Lumpur Railway Station. This can be seen in the domes on the arch.

Kota Darul Ehsan also features two cannons on each face of the arch.

== See also ==
- Federal Highway route Federal Route 2
- Selangor
- Tugu Keris
- Kuala Lumpur
