= Federal Highway (Malaysia) =

Major highway in Klang Valley, Malaysia

Federal Route 2
- Federal Highway (Kuala Lumpur–Klang Highway)
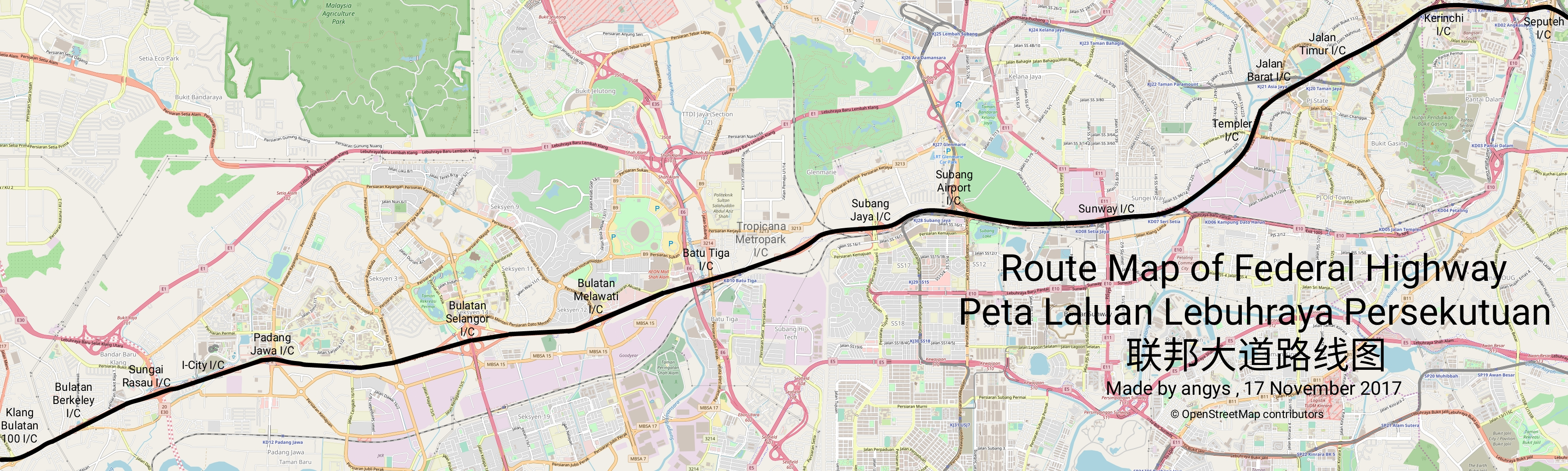

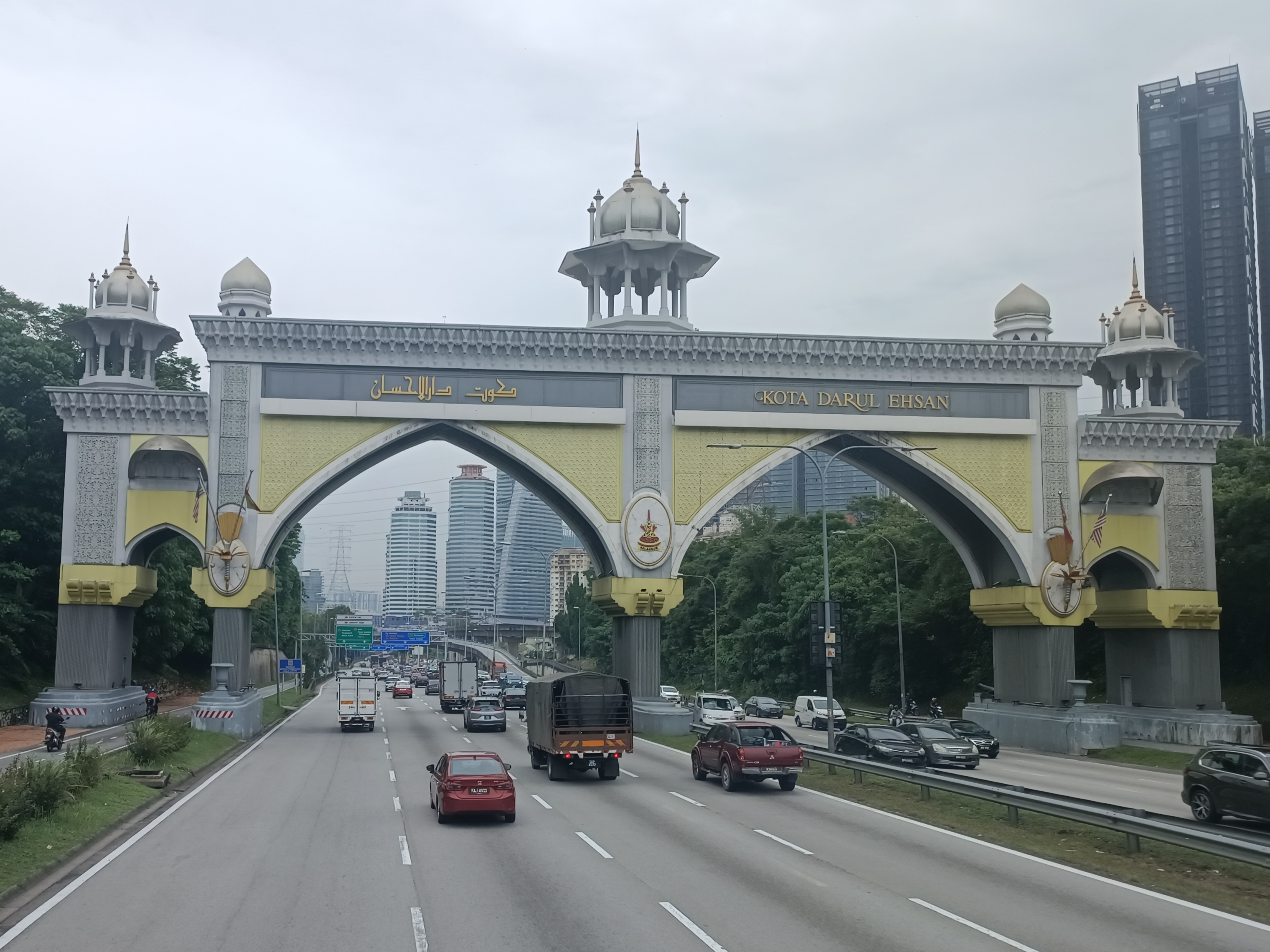

Route information
- Maintained by Public Works Department, JKR (at Selangor section) and Kuala Lumpur City Hall, DBKL (at Kuala Lumpur section)
- Length: 45 km (28 mi)
- Existed: 1974–present
- History: Completed in 1977, tolled segment completed 1992–1993

Major junctions
- West end: Klang, Selangor
- FT 2 / FT 5 Jalan Jambatan Kota; FT 5 Federal Route 5 New North Klang Straits Bypass / FT 20; West Coast Expressway; Kemuning–Shah Alam Highway; FT 3214 Jalan Subang–Batu Tiga; Persiaran Tujuan; FT 15 Sultan Abdul Aziz Shah Airport Highway; Majlis Link; Damansara–Puchong Expressway; New Pantai Expressway; Sprint Expressway (Kerinchi Link); Setiawangsa–Pantai Expressway; Bangsar–Petaling Jaya Bypass; FT 2 Jalan Syed Putra; FT 2 Jalan Klang Lama; East–West Link Expressway
- East end: Seputeh, Kuala Lumpur

Location
- Country: Malaysia
- Primary destinations: Port Klang, I-City, Padang Jawa, Shah Alam, Batu Tiga, Subang Jaya, Petaling Jaya, Kuala Lumpur

Highway system
- Highways in Malaysia; Expressways; Federal; State

Federal Highway (Malay: Lebuhraya Persekutuan; Jawi: لبوهراي ڤرسكوتوان; Chinese: 联邦大道, abbreviation: FH2) is a Malaysian controlled-access highway connecting the capital city of Kuala Lumpur, and Klang, the former capital of the state of Selangor. The highway starts from Seputeh in Kuala Lumpur to Klang, Selangor. It is the busiest highway in Klang Valley during rush hour from/to Kuala Lumpur. The Federal Highway is coded as Federal Route 2.

== History ==
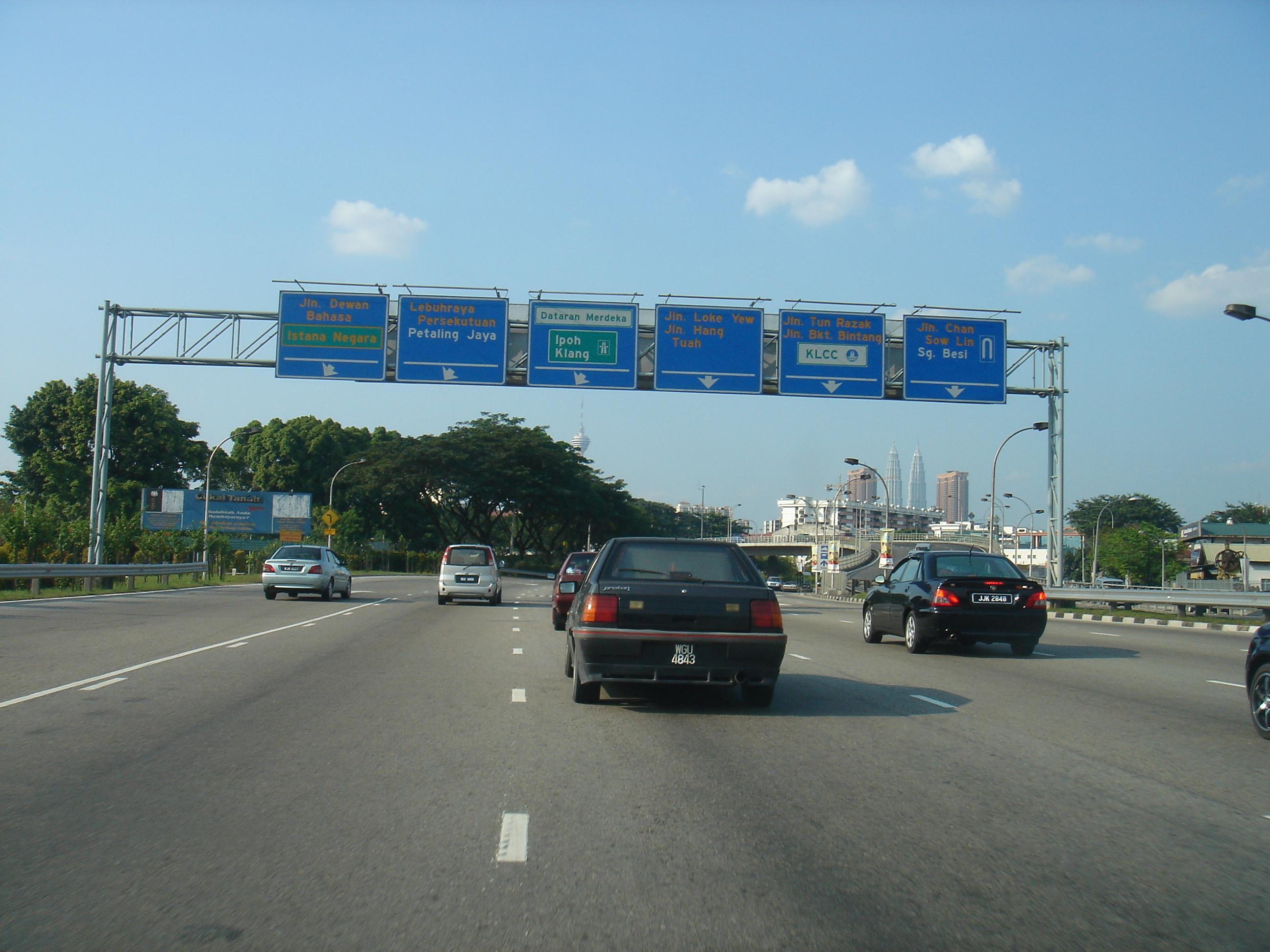
The Federal Highway, connecting Kuala Lumpur and Klang, Selangor.

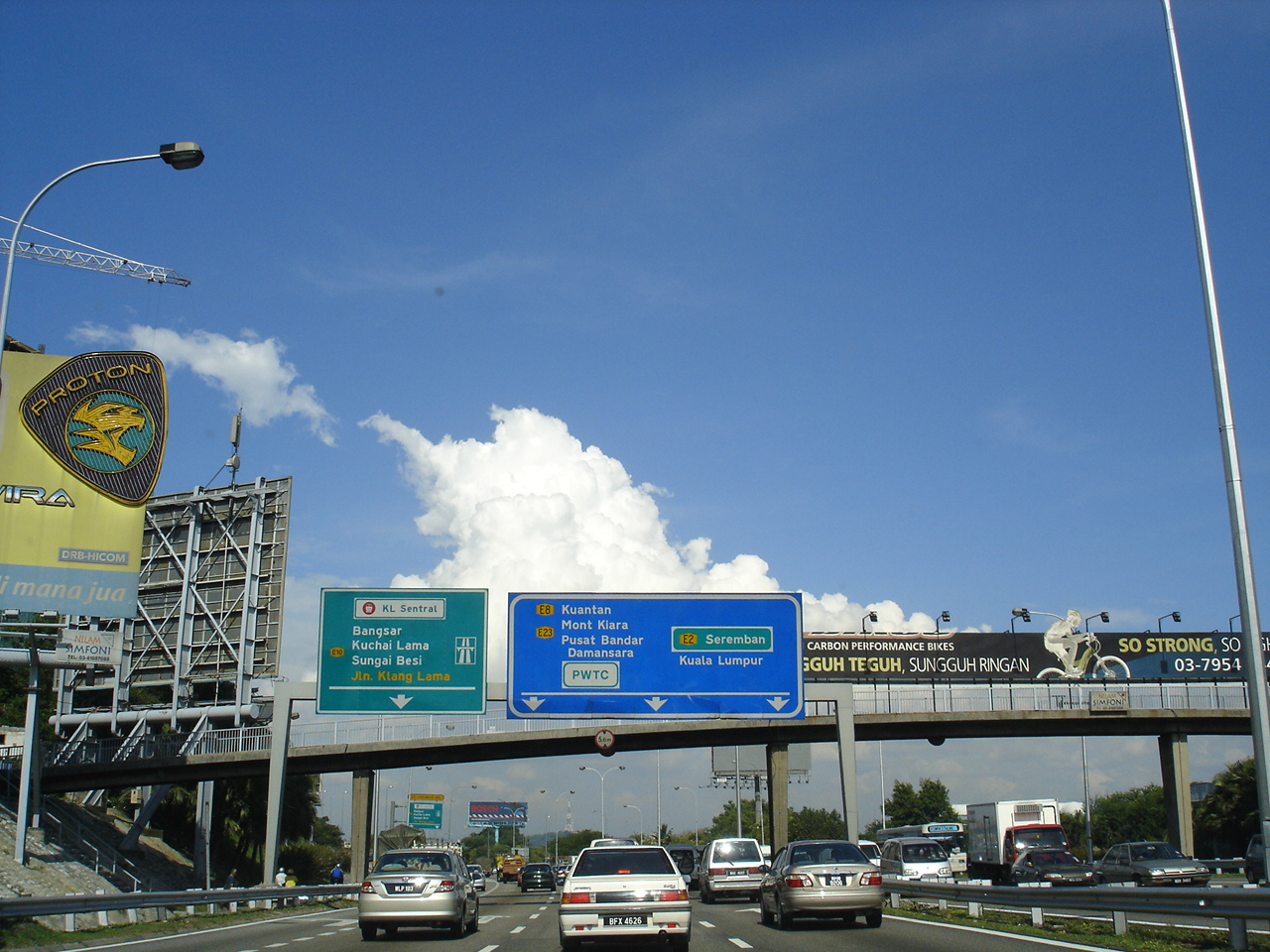
The Petaling Jaya stretch of the Federal Highway leading towards Kuala Lumpur

The history of the highway begins after the separation of Singapore from Malaysia on 9 August 1965, when the Malaysian government decided to make Port Swettenham (now Port Klang) as Malaysia's new national port as a replacement for Singapore's ports. As a result, the government planned to build a highway connecting Port Klang to Kuala Lumpur by upgrading the former Kuala Lumpur–Klang Highway (Jalan Kuala Lumpur–Klang) (opened to traffic on 14 January 1959) to a full motorway by replacing the existing at-grade intersections with interchanges, making the Federal Highway Malaysia's first expressway. The Kuala Lumpur–Petaling Jaya Traffic Dispersal Scheme was implemented in 1974 under the surveillance of the Malaysian Public Works Department (JKR). This scheme includes the Kuala Lumpur Inner Ring Road, Kuala Lumpur Middle Ring Road 1, Jalan Syed Putra and Federal Highway Route 2 (Kuala Lumpur–Petaling Jaya). Funded by a loan granted by the World Bank, the upgrade works for the Federal Highway from Subang Airport Interchange to Kuala Lumpur started from 1974 until 1977. The highway was originally a 4-lane limited access highway except for the Petaling Jaya stretch where it expands to a 6-lane highway. However, in 1992 PLUS Expressways, the concession holder of North–South Expressway has upgraded the entire highway to a 6-lane highway with two toll plazas, Batu Tiga and Sungai Rasau. The 6-lane toll highway had begun in operation on 11 May 1993. Since it serves as a connection between several major locations such as Klang, Shah Alam, Petaling Jaya and Kuala Lumpur, the highway constantly receives significant traffic flow and suffers from heavy traffic congestions during peak hours.

=== Upgrading of the Subang Airport Interchange and the Majlis Link ===
The upgrading of the Subang Airport Interchange including main link of Subang–Kelana Jaya Link from Sultan Abdul Aziz Shah Airport Highway (route 15) of Federal Highway (route 2) to Persiaran Kewajipan near Menara Mesiniaga began at the end of 2005 and the construction of the new Majlis Link in September 2005. Both project were led by Malaysian Public Works Department (JKR). While the main contractor were the Ahmad Zaki Resources Berhad (AZRB) and Ho Hup Construction Company Berhad (HHCC). The Majlis Link was completed in March 2007 while the Subang Airport Interchange was completed in September 2009.

== Features ==
- Variable Message System (VMS) from Integrated Transport Information System (ITIS) Traffic Management Centre
- Four and six lane carriageway
- 90 km/h speed limit
- LED Street Light
- Electronic LED billboards at street lights

=== Lane numbers ===
| Number | Section | Location | Notes |
|---|---|---|---|
| Four | Klang Bulatan 100 Interchange | Selangor | |
| Four | Seputeh Interchange | Kuala Lumpur | |
| Six | Bulatan Berkeley–Sungai Rasau Interchange | Selangor | |
| Six | Bulatan Selangor Interchange–Bulatan Melawati Interchange | Selangor | |
| Six | Subang Airport Interchange–Subang Jaya Exit | Selangor | |
| Six | Seri Setia–Sungai Penchala bridge | Selangor | |
| Eight | Padang Jawa–Bulatan Selangor Interchange | Selangor | |
| Eight | Persiaran Selangor Exit–Subang Jaya Interchange | Selangor | |
| Eight | Kawasan Perindustrian Bebas Exit–Seri Setia Exit | Selangor | |
| Eight | Templer Interchange–Kota Darul Ehsan | Selangor | |
| Eight | Mid Valley Exit | Kuala Lumpur | |
| Ten | Kerinchi Interchange | Kuala Lumpur | Some part is six |
| Twelve | Sungai Klang bridge | Kuala Lumpur | |
| Twelve | NPE Exit | Kuala Lumpur | 4+8 |

=== Landmarks ===
- The main landmarks of Federal Highway is Kota Darul Ehsan, the biggest arch in Malaysia located in Petaling Jaya. It was built on the orders of the former Sultan of Selangor, Sultan Salahuddin Abdul Aziz Shah to commemorate the cession of Kuala Lumpur to the federal government on 1 February 1974.
- The Tugu Keris monument was originally located near the Sungai Rasau toll plaza in Klang. However, it was relocated to the Klang Royal Gardens as the construction of a flyover obstructed its view.

=== Other features ===
- Federal Highway also has a motorcycle lane to avoid accidents between cars and motorcycles in that area.
- Bulatan Selangor (also known as Shah Alam Cloverleaf Interchange) in Shah Alam, Selangor is the biggest cloverleaf interchange in Malaysia.
- Breweries along this highway including Guinness Anchor Berhad (GAB) brewery in Sungai Way and Carlsberg brewery in Shah Alam.

=== Restricted routes for heavy vehicles ===
A restricted route has been implemented on the Federal Highway between Sungai Rasau and Subang during workdays and peak hours. Heavy vehicles (except buses and tankers) with laden and unladen heavy vehicles weighing 10,000 kg or more are not allowed to enter the expressway between 6:30 am until 9:30 am during Mondays to Fridays (except public holidays). A compound fine will be issued to heavy vehicles which flout the rule.

== Criticisms ==
=== Motorcycle lane hazards ===
The Federal Highway is well known as the first expressway in Malaysia to have motorcycle lanes. However, the motorcycle lanes in the Federal Highway are known for posing danger to motorcyclists, due to dark, narrow and poorly maintained lanes and ramps, dangerous sharp corners, vulnerable spots for robberies. This has been attributed to the fact that the motorcycle lanes were originally intended for bicycle riders, with the design speed limit as low as 60 km/h.

On 29 August 2016, the Ministry of Works (MOW) allocated RM 3.13 million to upgrade motorcycle lanes on the Federal Highway in areas that fall under its care. The allocation would cover costs for brightening dark areas, installing pump houses at flood-prone areas, painting road lines and tunnel walls, lane-widening, building overhead ramps, additional signage and repair of intersections.

On 21 October 2016, during the announcement of the 2017 Budget, former Malaysian Prime Minister Najib Tun Razak announced that RM29 million would be allocated to upgrading the motorcycle lane on the Federal Highway. This included enhancing the drainage system to prevent flooding and building two overhead ramps, to make it safer for motorcyclists who use the route.

=== Traffic congestion locations ===
Since the highway connects multiple major locations, significantly higher traffic may be observed at certain stretches of the highway:

| Kilometer | Direction | Stretches | Reasons |
|---|---|---|---|
| 11 - 15 | Kuala Lumpur bound | From Bulatan Selangor Interchange to Batu Tiga Interchange | Exiting towards Jalan Subang–Batu Tiga. |
| 19 - 27.3 | Kuala Lumpur bound | From Subang Airport Highway Interchange to NPE Interchange | Entering from Damansara–Puchong Expressway. |
| 33.1 - 21.1 | Klang bound | From Jalan Timur Interchange to Sunway Interchange | Exiting towards Damansara–Puchong Expressway. |

== Notable events ==
- 18 December 1988 - R. Arumugam, a Malaysian national football player, died in a car accident on the Federal Highway near the Mercedes Benz showroom at Petaling Jaya.
- 8 December 2010 - A driver was killed when he tried to make an illegal U-turn at KM 27.3 of the Federal Highway near Seri Setia.
- 21 April 2013 - Five people were killed following a freak accident along KM 10.1 of the Federal Highway near Shah Alam.
- 16 June 2013 - Three teenagers were killed and another injured when the car they were in crashed into the divider along KM 14.5 of the Federal Highway near Shah Alam.
- 19 February 2018 - Two people were killed in an accident when the car they were traveling in hit a pillar at the unused Batu Tiga toll plaza heading towards Shah Alam.

== Tolls ==
After the expansion of the highway by PLUS Expressways, several toll plazas have been set up and operations started from 11 May 1993. Like most PLUS-operated highways, there used to be a 10% discount for class 1 vehicles between 12:00 midnight and 7:00 am (RM0.90 at SGR and RM1.00 at BTT) since 1 March 2009.

However, toll collection at Sungai Rasau and Batu Tiga toll plazas have been abolished by the Malaysian government on 1 January 2018 with the government paying PLUS Expressways RM2.2 billion, spread over 20 years, as a result of the abolishment.

=== Electronic toll collection ===
As part of an initiative to facilitate smoother passage at the Batu Tiga and Sungai Rasau Toll Plazas on Federal Highway. On 10 July 2014, the highway operator, PLUS Expressways, announced that all toll transactions at both toll plazas would be conducted electronically via PLUSMiles cards, Touch 'n Go cards or SmartTAGs starting 1 September 2014. Besides being more convenient to Federal Highway users and reducing jams at toll plazas caused by cash-paying motorists, this move might had helped reducing risks of robberies at toll plazas faced by toll attendants, as there would have been less cash available. However, on 30 August 2014, the implementation of the ETCs at Batu Tiga and Sungai Rasau toll plaza was postponed by the federal government.

Since 22 November 2014, all toll transactions at Batu Tiga and Sungai Rasau toll plazas of the Federal Highway had been conducted electronically via PLUSMiles cards, Touch 'n Go cards or SmartTAGs.

Toll collection was discontinued since 1 January 2018.

== Interchange lists ==
Below is a list of interchanges (exits), laybys and rest and service areas along the Federal Highway route. The exits are arranged in ascending numerical order from West to East. The speed limit of entire route is 90 km/h.

Legend:

- I/C - Interchange, I/S - Intersection, RSA - Rest and service area, OBR - Overhead bridge restaurant, R/R - Restaurant and rest plaza, L/B - Layby, V/P - Vista point, TN - tunnel, T/P - Toll plaza, BR - Bridge
- C - Cloverleaf, S - Stack, T-A - Trumpet-A, T-B - Trumpet-B, DT - Directional-T/Y, SDT - Semi-Directional-T/Y, P-Y - Partial-Y, D - Diamond, P-C - Partial cloverleaf, D-D - Diverging diamond, D-R - Direct ramp

| State/territory | District | Location | km | mi | Exit | Name | Destinations | Notes |
|---|---|---|---|---|---|---|---|---|
| Selangor | Klang | Klang | | | Through to FT 2 Jalan Jambatan Kota | | | |
| Selangor | Klang | Klang | | | 208 | Klang Bulatan 100 I/C | Jalan Batu Tiga – Klang Town Centre, Meru, Kapar | Roundabout Interchange |
| Selangor | Klang | Klang | | | 209 | Bulatan Berkeley I/C | Jalan Batu Tiga Lama – Jalan Dato' Mohd Sidin (Connaught Bridge); Persiaran Rajawali – Taman Berkeley, Bukit Raja | |
| Selangor | Klang | Klang | | | | Persiaran Bukit Raja 1 Exit | Persiaran Bukit Raja 1 – Bandar Baru Klang | Kuala Lumpur bound |
| Selangor | Klang | Klang | 5.6– 5.7 | 3.5– 3.5 | 210 | Sungai Rasau I/C | New North Klang Straits Bypass / FT 20 – Bandar Baru Klang, Port Klang, Kapar, Meru, Bukit Raja; Jalan Batu Tiga Lama – Jalan Dato' Mohd Sidin (Connaught Bridge) | |
| Selangor | Klang | Klang | 5.6– 5.7 | 3.5– 3.5 | 210 | Sungai Rasau I/C | West Coast Expressway – Taiping, Sri Andalas, Banting | Kuala Lumpur bound |
| Selangor | Klang–Petaling District Border | | | | Sungai Rasau bridge | | | |
| Selangor | Petaling | Shah Alam | | | | Sungai Rasau Exit | Jalan Batu Tiga Lama – Jalan Sungai Rasau | Klang bound |
| Selangor | Petaling | Shah Alam | | | 211 | I-City I/C | Persiaran I-City – I-City | Direct interchange to I-City |
| Selangor | Petaling | Shah Alam | | | Former Sungai Rasau Toll Plaza Location; Toll operation discontinued | | | |
| Selangor | Petaling | Shah Alam | | | Sungai Rasau L/B (Kuala Lumpur bound) | | | |
| Selangor | Petaling | Shah Alam | | | 212 | Padang Jawa I/C | BSA7 Persiaran Kayangan – Shah Alam, UiTM, Hospital Shah Alam; Jalan Padang Jawa – Padang Jawa; Road Transport Department (JPJ) Selangor state headquarters | Diamond Interchange |
| Selangor | Petaling | Shah Alam | 9.0 | 5.6 | Shah Alam L/B – Petronas, Shell, KFC (Kuala Lumpur bound) | | | |
| Selangor | Petaling | Shah Alam | 9.0 | 5.6 | Shah Alam L/B – BH Petrol (Klang bound) | | | |
| Selangor | Petaling | Shah Alam | 11.0 | 6.8 | 213 | Bulatan Selangor I/C (Shah Alam main I/C) | Kemuning–Shah Alam Highway – Alam Impian, Kota Kemuning; BSA1 Persiaran Sultan – Shah Alam city centre, UiTM; FT 190 Persiaran Selangor – Shah Alam Industrial Area | Cloverleaf Interchange |
| Selangor | Petaling | Shah Alam | 13.0 | 8.1 | Petronas L/B (Klang bound, Beside Chinese Cemetery) | | | |
| Selangor | Petaling | Shah Alam | 13.0 | 8.1 | 214 | Bulatan Melawati I/C | BSA7 Persiaran Kayangan – Shah Alam Section 9-13; FT 3214 BSA7 Shah Alam–Puchong Highway – Puchong, Shah Alam Industrial Area | Roundabout Interchange |
| Selangor | Petaling | Shah Alam | 14.6 | 9.1 | Petron and Shell L/B (Kuala Lumpur bound) | | | |
| Selangor | Petaling | Shah Alam | | | | Persiaran Selangor Exit | FT 3216 Persiaran Selangor – Section 15-16, Shah Alam Industrial Area, Carlsberg Brewery | Klang bound |
| Selangor | Petaling | Shah Alam | 14.9 | 9.3 | Sungai Damansara bridge | | | |
| Selangor | Petaling | Shah Alam | 15.0 | 9.3 | 215 | Batu Tiga I/C | FT 3214 Jalan Subang – HICOM-Glenmarie, Bukit Jelutong; FT 3214 Persiaran Jubli Perak – Batu Tiga Puchong, Ebor North | Diamond Interchange |
| Selangor | Petaling | Shah Alam | | | 216 | Tropicana Metropark I/C | Tropicana Metropark, Persiaran Teknologi Subang, Persiaran Setia, USJ | Direct Interchange |
| Selangor | Petaling | Shah Alam | | | Former Batu Tiga Toll Plaza Location; Toll operation discontinued | | | |
| Selangor | Petaling | Shah Alam | 16.9 | 10.5 | Batu Tiga Toll Plaza L/B (Kuala Lumpur bound) | | | |
| Selangor | Petaling | Shah Alam | 17.0 | 10.6 | Batu Tiga L/B – Shell, Petronas, A&W (Kuala Lumpur bound) | | | |
| Selangor | Petaling | Shah Alam | 17.2 | 10.7 | Railway crossing bridge 10 under construction railway | | | |
| Selangor | Petaling | Shah Alam | 17.9 | 11.1 | 217 | Subang Jaya I/C | Persiaran Tujuan – Subang Jaya, UEP Subang Jaya, Subang Parade, Empire Subang | Trumpet Interchange |
| Selangor | Petaling | Shah Alam | 18.0 | 11.2 | Shell and Petronas L/B – Shell, Petronas, Starbucks (Kuala Lumpur bound) | | | |
| Selangor | Petaling | Shah Alam | 17.9 | 11.1 | 218 | Subang Airport I/C | FT 15 Sultan Abdul Aziz Shah Airport Highway – Subang, Sultan Abdul Aziz Shah Airport, Subang | Stacked Interchange |
| Selangor | Petaling | Petaling Jaya | 18.2 | 11.3 | 219 | Subang Jaya Exit | FT 15 Persiaran Kewajipan (Off ramp to Subang Jaya only) – Subang Jaya, UEP Subang Jaya, Subang Parade, Empire Subang | Klang bound |
| Selangor | Petaling | Petaling Jaya | | | 220 | Kawasan Perindustrian Bebas Exit | Jalan SS 8/2 – Sungai Way FIZ, SS1 | Kuala Lumpur bound |
| Selangor | Petaling | Petaling Jaya | | | 221 | KGNS Exit | Jalan SS 7/2 – Kelab Golf Negara Subang, SS7, Kelana Jaya, Stadium Petaling Jaya | Kuala Lumpur bound |
| Selangor | Petaling | Petaling Jaya | | | | Setia Jaya station | Setia Jaya station – KTM Komuter& B1 | Klang bound |
| Selangor | Petaling | Petaling Jaya | 21.1 | 13.1 | 222 | Sunway I/C | Damansara–Puchong Expressway – Kepong, Ampang , Cheras, Puchong, Bandar Sunway | Multi-level Diverging diamond interchange |
| Selangor | Petaling | Petaling Jaya | | | 223 | Seri Setia Exit | Jalan SS 9a/1 – Sungai Way, Seri Setia, Kelana Jaya | Kuala Lumpur bound |
| Selangor | Petaling | Petaling Jaya | 27.0 | 16.8 | | Seri Setia Komuter station | Seri Setia Komuter station – KTM Komuter | Klang bound |
| Selangor | Petaling | Petaling Jaya | | | 224 | NPE Expressway Exit | New Pantai Expressway – Bangsar, Kuchai Lama , Sungai Besi, Jalan Klang Lama | From/To Klang Only |
| Selangor | Petaling | Petaling Jaya | | | 225 | Jalan 227 Exit | Jalan 225 – Petaling Jaya Old Town | Kuala Lumpur Bound |
| Selangor | Petaling | Petaling Jaya | | | Sungai Penchala bridge | | | |
| Selangor | Petaling | Petaling Jaya | 31.3 | 19.4 | 226 | Templer I/C | Jalan Templer – Petaling Jaya Old Town; Jalan PP Narayanan (Jalan 222) – Petaling Jaya Selatan (PJS) | Diamond Interchange |
| Selangor | Petaling | Petaling Jaya | 32.4 | 20.1 | 227 | Jalan Utara I/C | Petaling Jaya Inner Ring Road – Jalan Utara, Jalan Barat, Petaling Jaya city centre, Asia Jaya LRT station | Diamond Interchange |
| Selangor | Petaling | Petaling Jaya | 33.1 | 20.6 | 228 | Jalan Timur I/C | Petaling Jaya Inner Ring Road – Jalan Timur, Jalan Utara, Petaling Jaya city centre, Taman Jaya LRT station | Diamond Interchange |
| Selangor | Petaling | Petaling Jaya | | | 229 | Jalan Gasing Exit | Jalan Universiti – Universiti Malaya; University Malaya Medical Centre; Jalan Gasing – Petaling Jaya Old Town | Half-diamond Interchange; From/To Kuala Lumpur only |
| Selangor–FT Kuala Lumpur border | | | | | Kota Darul Ehsan | | | |
| Kuala Lumpur | Lembah Pantai | Kerinchi | | | | Kerinchi I/C | Sprint Expressway (Kerinchi Link) – Mont Kiara, Sri Hartamas, Damansara, Segambut; Jalan Pantai Baharu –Kg. Kernchi, Bangsar, Menara Telekom, Kerinchi LRT station Jalan Kerinchi –Bangsar South (Kerinchi), Universiti LRT station, KL-Gateway; Setiawangsa–Pantai Expressway – Setiawangsa, Bandar Malaysia, Wangsa Maju, Kuantan | Directional T expressway interchange Diamond interchange Stacked interchange |
| Kuala Lumpur | Lembah Pantai | Mid Valley City | | | | Mid Valley Exit | Bangsar–Petaling Jaya Bypass – Bangsar; Lingkaran Syed Putra –Mid Valley City, Mid Valley Megamall, The Gardens, Zone A to F, Mid Valley Komuter station KTM Komuter | From/To Klang only |
| Kuala Lumpur | Lembah Pantai | Mid Valley City | | | KTM ETS/Komuter Railway crossing bridge | | | |
| Kuala Lumpur | Lembah Pantai | Mid Valley City | | | Sungai Klang bridge | | | |
| Kuala Lumpur | Lembah Pantai | Mid Valley City | | | | NPE Exit | New Pantai Expressway – Bandar Sunway, Subang Jaya, Angkasapuri Komuter station KTM Komuter | Bypass ramp to NPE only From Kuala Lumpur only |
| Kuala Lumpur | Seputeh | Seputeh | | | | Seputeh I/C | FT 2 Jalan Syed Putra – Kuala Lumpur city centre, Brickfields, KL Sentral; FT 2 Jalan Klang Lama –Kuchai Lama, Taman OUG, Puchong | Stacked interchange |
| Kuala Lumpur | Seputeh | Seputeh | | | Through to East–West Link Expressway | | | |
1.000 mi = 1.609 km; 1.000 km = 0.621 mi: Concurrency terminus; Closed/former; Incomplete access; Route transition

== See also ==
- Malaysia Federal Route 2
- Persiaran Raja Muda Musa
- Jalan Klang Lama
- Jalan Syed Putra
- Malaysian Expressway System
- Malaysian Federal Roads System
- Highway
- Teras Teknologi
