= Tugu Keris =

Monument in Klang, Malaysia

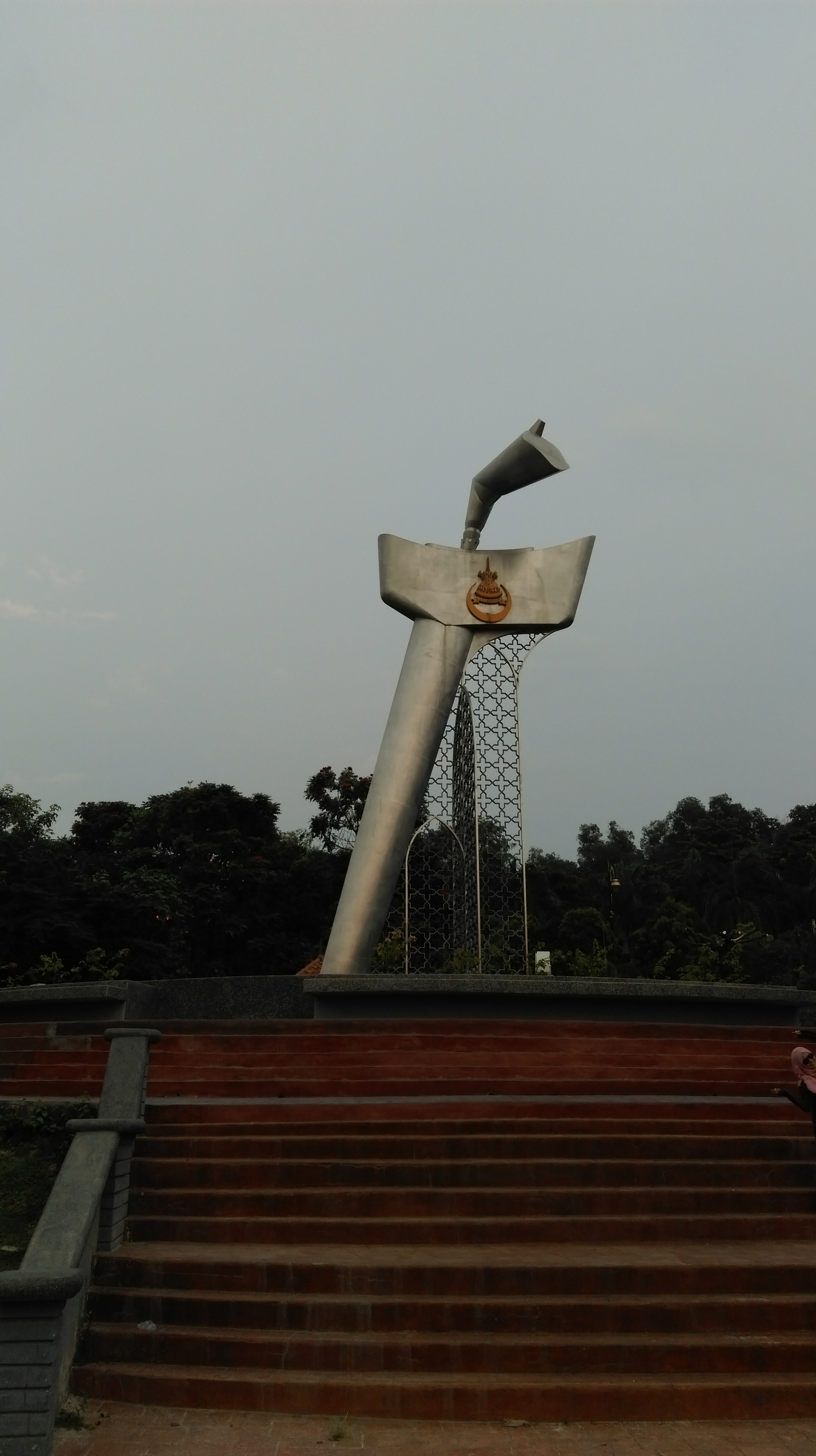
- Year: 1985
- Type: Industrial aluminium, Steel
- Location: Klang, Selangor, Malaysia; 3.036427°N 101.444404°E
- Owner: Klang Municipal Council (MPK)

Tugu Keris (Kris Monument) is a huge monument in the shape of a kris in Klang, Selangor, Malaysia. Its construction was ordered by the Sultan of Selangor, Almarhum Sultan Salahuddin Abdul Aziz Shah to commemorate the Silver Jubilee of his reign on 30 September 1985.

The monument is located at Klang Royal Gardens, opposite the Church of Our Lady of Lourdes Klang. Both the church and the monument is featured in the landmarks of Selangor list.

== Relocation ==
It is originally located along the Federal Highway (Federal Route 2) near Taman Kris and Sungai Rasau toll plaza. In September 2014, the monument was relocated to its present site in Klang Royal Gardens off Jalan Tengku Kelana. The relocation was done since the original monument was blocked by a flyover being built just after the Sungai Rasau toll plaza. The monument can be easily seen from the Simpang Lima roundabout.

== See also ==
- Kota Darul Ehsan
- Church of Our Lady of Lourdes Klang
- Klang (city)
