= Majlis Link =

Road in Malaysia

Route information
- Length: 1 km (0.62 mi)
- Existed: 2004–present
- History: Completed in 2006

Major junctions
- North end: Jalan Majlis Interchange; Damansara–Puchong Expressway Damansara–Puchong Expressway
- Jalan Majlis; Damansara–Puchong Expressway Damansara–Puchong Expressway; FT 2 Federal Highway
- South end: FT 2 Federal Highway

Location
- Country: Malaysia
- Primary destinations: Kelana Jaya; Subang Jaya; Shah Alam; Klang

Highway system
- Highways in Malaysia; Expressways; Federal; State

The Majlis Link is a major highway link in Petaling Jaya city, Selangor, Malaysia. It is built as a bypass to enable motorists from the Federal Highway (Klang direction) to go to Jalan Majlis or vice versa without the need to pass through the congested Freescale Interchange of the Damansara–Puchong Expressway.

== List of junctions ==
Km	Exit	Junctions	To	Remarks
		Jalan Majlis-LDP	North; Jalan Majlis; Section—to -- Kelana Jaya; Hajj pilgrim's complex Damansara–Puchong Expressway Damansara–Puchong Expressway; West; Sungai Buloh; Kepong; Damansara; East; Putrajaya; Cyberjaya; Puchong; Bandar Sunway	Diamond interchange
		Duty Free Trade Zone	Duty Free Trade Zone; Freescale factory Western Digital factory	T-junctions
		Majlis Link flyover Jalan SS 7/2	Below Flyover; Jalan SS 7/2; Setia Jaya; Nanyang Siang Pau factory Stadium MBPJ; U-Turn	Start/End of flyover Ramp from/to Jalan Majlis
		Majlis Link flyover		
		Majlis Link flyover Federal Highway	FT 2 Federal Highway; West Only; Subang Jaya; Shah Alam; Klang	To/From west only
