= 1974 Federal Territory of Kuala Lumpur Agreement =

Agreement between Selangor and Malaysia

The 1974 Federal Territory of Kuala Lumpur Agreement was signed on 1 February 1974 by the fifth Yang di-Pertuan Agong, Abdul Halim of Kedah, on behalf of the Federal Government of Malaysia; and the Sultan of Selangor, Salahuddin, on behalf of the State Government of Selangor. This agreement was signed at the Istana Negara, Kuala Lumpur, and signified the official handing of Kuala Lumpur territory over to the Federal Government, which resulted in the establishment of the Federal Territory.

There are four provisions made in this agreement, namely, the transfer of jurisdiction powers to the Federal Territory, encompassing the areas of the Federal Territory, concerns on return, financial calculation and Board of Advisors.

== Full text of the agreement ==
The following is the full text of the 1974 Federal Territory of Kuala Lumpur Agreement:

=== Kuala Lumpur Agreement ===
Agreement relating to the establishment of Federal Territory

WHEREAS an agreement has been reached between the Federation of Malaysia and the State of Selangor concerning the establishment of the Federal Territory.

AND WHEREAS in pursuance of the agreement Parliament and the State Legislative Assembly of Selangor have respectively passed the law relating to the establishing of the Federal Territory and the Federal Territory Enactment, 1973.

AND WHEREAS both the said laws had previous to their passing been consented to by the Conference of Rulers.

AND WHEREAS it is necessary that a formal Agreement relating to the establishment of the Federal Territory be signed.

The Federation of Malaysia and the State of Selangor hereby AGREE as follows: —

ARTICLE I

1. As from 1st of February, 1974 the areas described in Article II shall become the Federal Territory, and thereupon the said areas shall cease to form part of the State of Selangor and His Royal Highness the Sultan of Selangor shall, save as provided in Article III, relinquish and cease to exercise any sovereignty over them, and all power and jurisdiction of His Royal Highness or of the Legislative Assembly of the State of Selangor in or in respect of the said areas shall come to an end.
2. The Federation shall exercise sovereignty over the said areas and all power and jurisdiction in or in respect of the said areas shall be vested in the Federation.

[Transfer of jurisdiction and powers over the Federal Territory.]

ARTICLE II

The Federal Territory shall consist of the areas shown in the deposited plan identified by reference to Gazette Plan No. 383 being the plan: —

(a) certified by the Chief Surveyor Selangor as a true and correct plan of the areas; and

(b) dated and deposited in the office of the Chief Surveyor, Selangor.

[Area of the Federal Territory.]

ARTICLE III

If the areas described in Article II shall cease to be Federal Capital, the said areas shall revert to the State of Selangor.

[Reversion.]

ARTICLE IV

1. There shall be a financial arrangement between the Federation and the State of Selangor and for this purpose there shall be constituted a committee to be called the Financial Committee consisting of not less than five members to be appointed jointly by the Yang di-Pertuan Agong and His Royal Highness the Sultan of Selangor.
2. Within a period of one year after the execution of this Agreement for such further period as may be approved by the Yang di-Pertuan Agong and His Royal Highness the Sultan of Selangor, the Financial Committee shall make recommendation to both the Federation and the State of Selangor for their approval; and any payment made in contemplation of this Article shall be taken into account by the Financial Committee; and the recommendation when approved shall be binding on both the Federation and the State of Selangor.

[Financial Arrangement.]

ARTICLE V

Notwithstandang anything in the Federal Capital Act, 1960, the Yang di-Pertuan Agong shall appoint two persons nominated by His Royal Highness the Sultan of Selangor to be members of the Advisory Board under section 6 of that Act or under any other law replacing that Act.

[Members of the Advisory Board.]

ARTICLE VI

This Agreement shall be expressed in Bahasa Malaysia and in English language. In case of doubt the text of the Agreement in Bahasa Malaysia shall prevail.

[Language of Agreement.]

In Witness Whereof His Majesty the Yang di-Pertuan Agong and His Royal Highness the Sultan of Selangor have hereunto set their hands and seals.

Done at Kuala Lumpur the first day of February 1974, corresponding to the eighth day of Muharram, 1394, in two copies, one copy of which shall be deposited with each party.

[Seal of the Federation]	[Seal of the State of Selangor]
[Signature]	[Signature]
the Yang di-Pertuan Agong	the Sultan of Selangor
For the Federation of Malaysia	For the State of Selangor

In the presence of —

[Signature]	[Signature]
Sultan of Pahang	Raja of Perlis
[Signature]	[Signature]
Sultan of Kelantan	Sultan of Perak
[Signature]	[Signature]
Yang di-Pertuan Besar of Negeri Sembilan	Regent of Kedah
[Signature]	[Signature]
Governor of Pulau Pinang	Governor of Sarawak
[Signature]	[Signature]
Governor of Melaka	Yang di-Pertua Negara of Sabah
Witnessed by—	Witnessed by—
[Signature]	[Signature]
the Prime Minister of Malaysia	the Menteri Besar of Selangor

== The proclamation of the Federal Territory of Kuala Lumpur, 1974 ==
The Federal Territory of Kuala Lumpur was proclaimed on 1 February 1974 and signed by the second prime minister of Malaysia, Abdul Razak Hussein. This proclamation came about after the signing of the Federal Territory of Kuala Lumpur Agreement by the fifth Yang di-Pertuan Agong, Abdul Halim of Kedah, on the same day. The proclamation came into effect on 1 February 1974 with Kuala Lumpur and the areas gazetted under Plan Gazette No. 383 forming the Federal Territory.

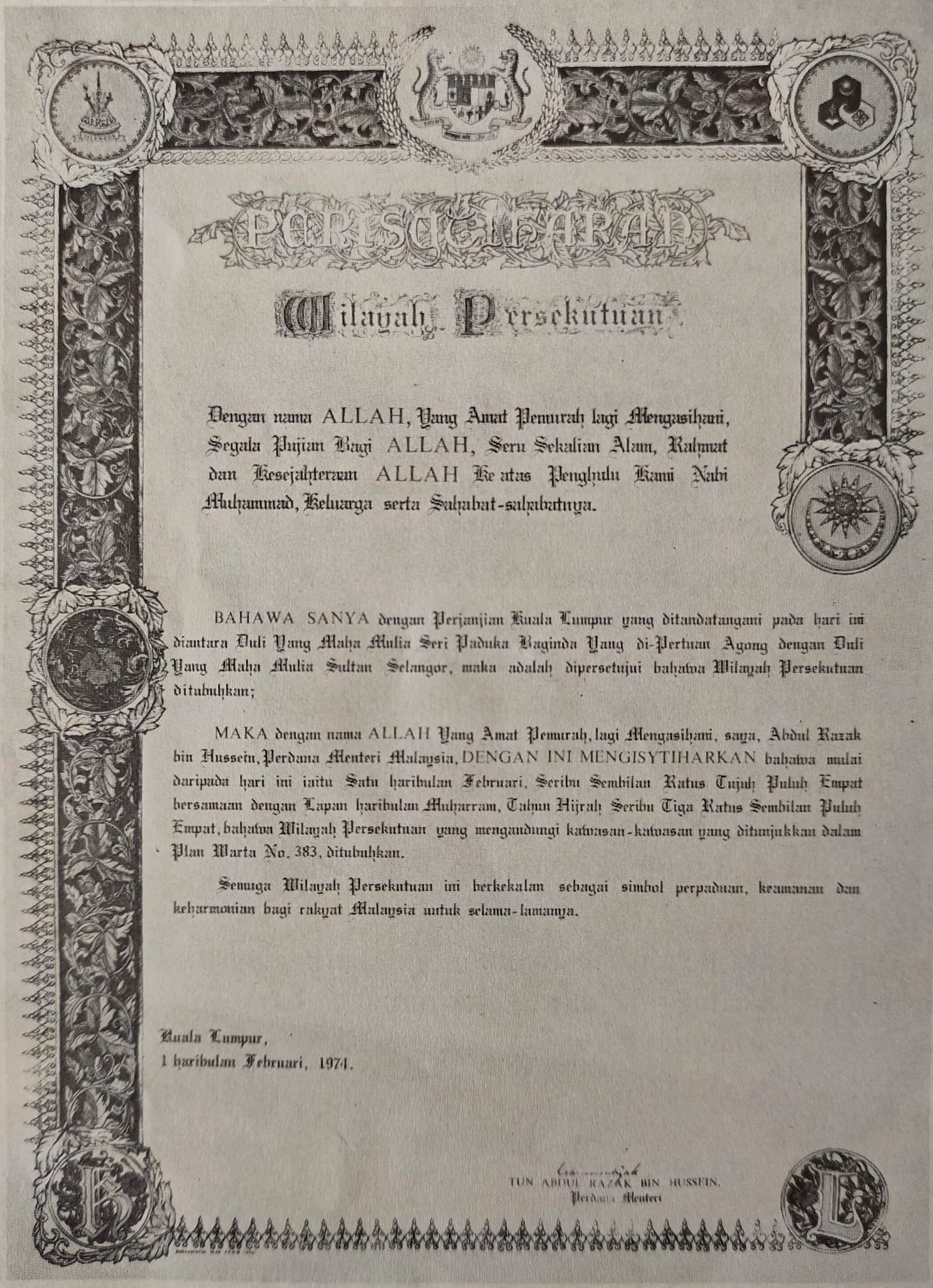
Proclamation of Federal Territory 1974 by the 2nd Prime Minister of Malaysia, Tun Abdul Razak Hussein, written in Malay.

The following is the English translation of the Proclamation of Federal Territory 1974:

=== Proclamation of Federal Territory ===
In the name of Allah, the Compassionate and the Merciful, Praise be to Allah, the Lord of the Universe, and may the benediction and peace of Allah be upon Our Leader Prophet Muhammad and upon all his Relations and Friends.

WHEREAS with the Kuala Lumpur Agreement signed today between His Majesty the Yang di-Pertuan Agong and His Royal Highness the Sultan of Selangor, it is agreed upon that the Federal Territory be established;

THEREFORE, in the name of Allah, the Compassionate and Merciful, I, Abdul Razak bin Hussein, Prime Minister of Malaysia, DO HEREBY PROCLAIM that as from this day, the first day of February, one thousand nine hundred and seventy four, corresponding to the eighth day of Muharram, the year of Hijrah one thousand three hundred and ninety four, that the Federal Territory consists of the areas described in the Gazette Plan No. 383 be established.

May this Federal Territory remain as a symbol of unity, peace, and harmony for the people of Malaysia forever.

Kuala Lumpur,

First day of February 1974.

[Signature]

TUN ABDUL RAZAK BIN HUSSEIN.

Prime Minister

== Legacy ==
The removal of Kuala Lumpur, with its large ethnic Chinese population, from Selangor secured Barisan Nasional's control of that state. The city now falls under the purview of the Ministry of Federal Territories, and the Parliament of Malaysia legislates on all matters concerning the territory. The city elects 11 representatives from single-member constituencies to the Dewan Rakyat (House of Representatives) of the Parliament, and the Yang di-Pertuan Agong appoints two senators to represent Kuala Lumpur in the Dewan Negara. However, there are no local elections, with the federal government having jurisdiction over what would be state matters.

In 2024, Selangor Menteri Besar Amirudin Shari expressed interest in reincorporating Kuala Lumpur. He claimed that under the 1974 agreement, Kuala Lumpur would return to Selangor if it was no longer the administrative centre and the site of parliament building. While it remains the site of parliament, the federal administration has moved to Putrajaya.

== See also ==
- Kota Darul Ehsan
- Kuala Lumpur
- Labuan
- Putrajaya
- Federal Territory Day
