= Motorcycle lane =

Lane on a road reserved for motorcycles

Motorcycle lane is a term used for the special lane on a roadway that is designated for small vehicles such as motorcycles, scooters, bicycles and trishaw. It is usually situated between the other lanes, marked by 2 parallel yellow lines. Due to the popularity of such vehicles in several Asian countries, motorcycle lanes are commonly found there.

== Motorcycles lanes by country ==
=== Malaysia ===
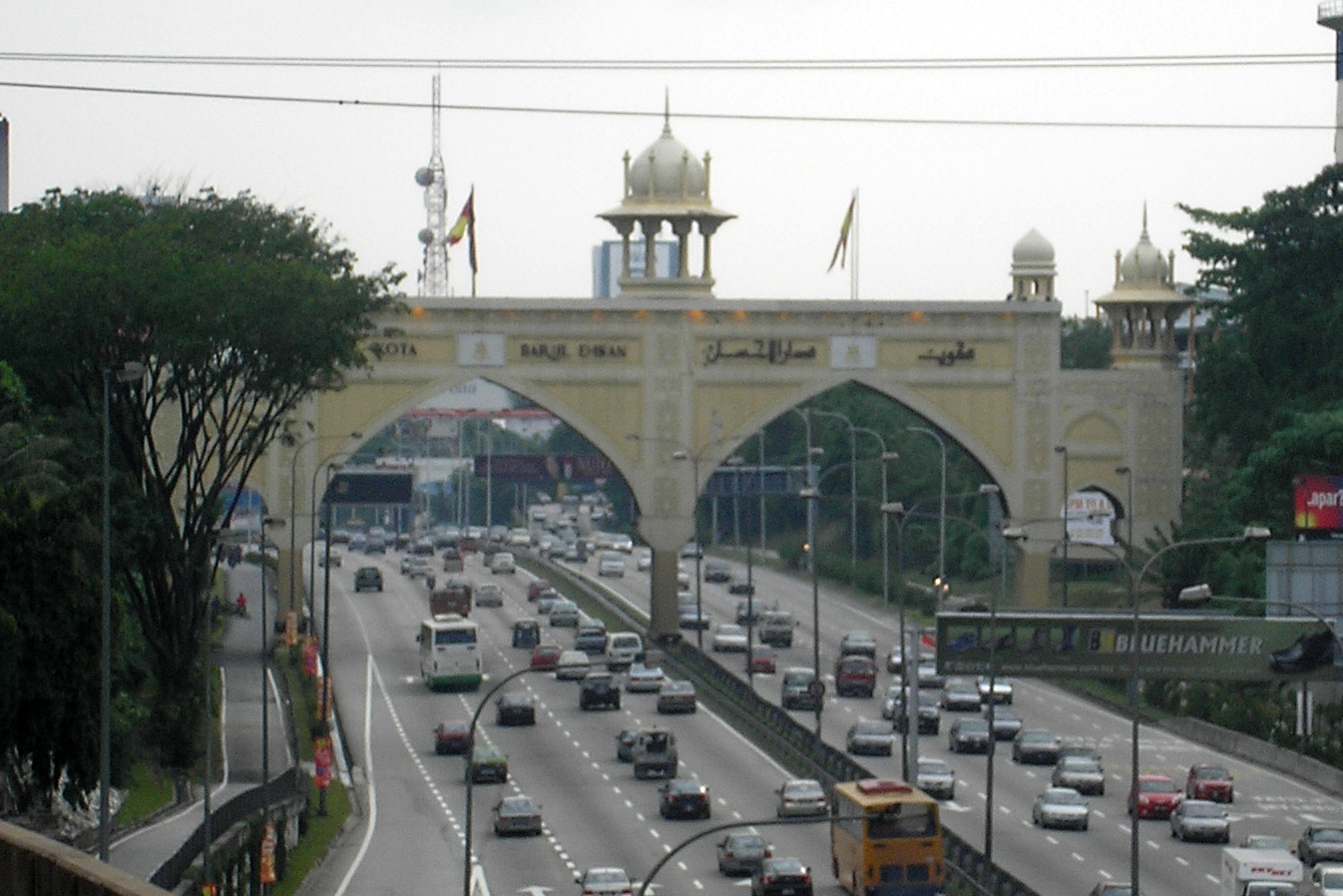
Motorcycle lanes on a typical expressway in Malaysia are completely separated from the main carriageways, such as on the Federal Highway.

In some parts of the expressways and highways in Malaysia, there is an additional lane designated for motorcycles. These lanes are usually about half the width of a normal lane on the North–South Expressway and are positioned on the extreme left side of the main carriageway for each direction of travel. These special lanes are found in Shah Alam Expressway, Butterworth–Kulim Expressway, Federal Highway, Guthrie Corridor Expressway, Putrajaya–Cyberjaya Expressway, Port of Tanjung Pelepas Highway, Sultan Mahmud Bridge Highway, Sultan Ismail Bridge and all major highways in Putrajaya.

Motorcycle lanes in Malaysia provide special shelter stations, providing protection for motorcyclists against heavy rain. Most motorcycle shelters are located below overhead bridges, but sometimes special booths are placed in the actual motorcycle lanes.

On Malaysian federal roads, the motorcycle lanes are placed at the far left side of each roadway regardless of direction, and are separated from the primary lanes by black-and-white stripes, enabling motorcyclists to overtake slower motorcycles and to exit the road by turning right.

=== Indonesia ===
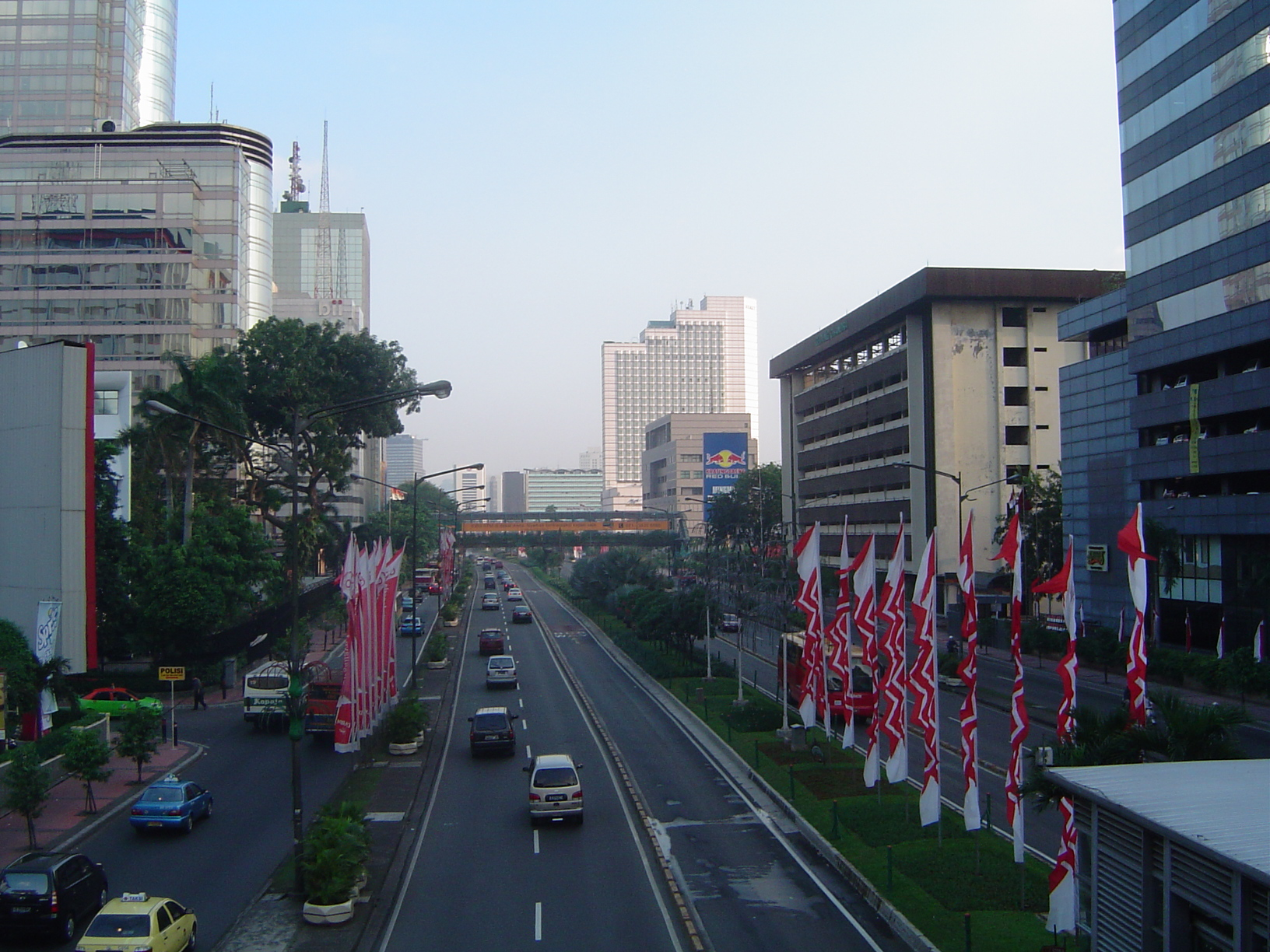
The collector lanes are used as motorcycle lanes like this one in Central Jakarta.

Generally, motorcyclists in Indonesia are not allowed to use the toll roads, they are to use the trunk roads instead. However, some urban toll roads, like those in Jakarta, are provided with collector lanes functioning as motorcycle lanes. Currently, the Suramadu Bridge is the only tollway that has a motorcycle lane and a special fee for motorcycles to enter the bridge. Another one is Bali Mandara Toll Road in Bali. The government is still on hold in agreement with toll road operators and contractors to construct motorcycle lanes to follow the new law about motorcycles going to toll roads across the country. The rule was signed in 2009 and discussions are still ongoing. Details to sort out will include the design and modification of toll roads for all motorcycles and mopeds, including the number of motorcycles per day on normal highways and toll roads in Indonesia.

=== Philippines ===
A prominent motorcycle lane in the Philippines can be found on the Epifanio Delos Santos Avenue (EDSA). It is the fourth lane from the sidewalk and, whilst private light vehicles can also use it, they are only permitted to pass through the lane. Other roads with motorcycle lanes include Commonwealth Avenue and Quezon Avenue, both in Quezon City, Diosdado Macapagal Boulevard in Pasay and Parañaque and Circumferential Road 5.

=== Taiwan ===
In Taiwan, motorcycle and slow vehicle lanes are lanes dedicated to or prioritized for motorcycles (defined as fast vehicles in regulations) and slow vehicles. They are commonly seen on major bridges and specific road sections (the following images do not apply to the Taiwan cycling routes):

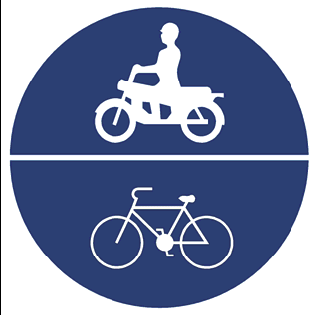
Exclusive road for bicycles and motorcycles with a cubic capacity of less than 250 cm³ (motorcycle and slow vehicle exclusive road)

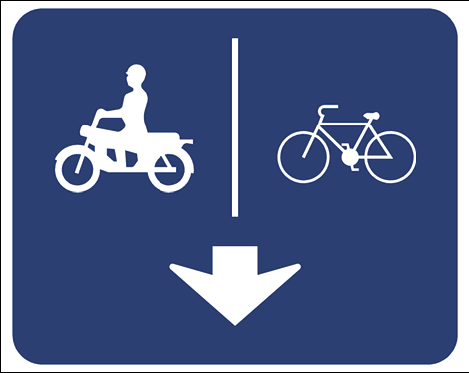
Exclusive lane for bicycles and motorcycles with a cubic capacity of less than 250 cm³ (motorcycle and slow vehicle exclusive lane)

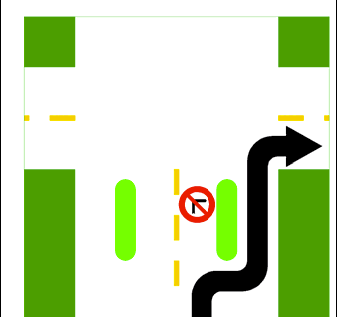
Fast and slow vehicle lane separated road where right turns are prohibited from the fast lane

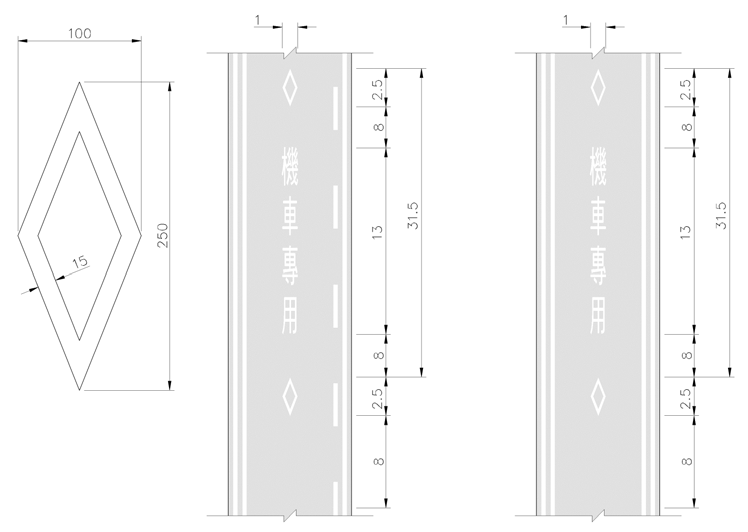
Exclusive lane for motorcycles with a cubic capacity of less than 250 cm³ (motorcycle exclusive lane)

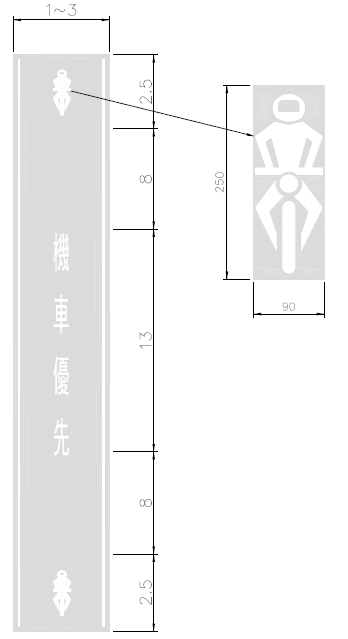
Priority lane for motorcycles with a cubic capacity of less than 250 cm³ (motorcycle priority lane)

==== Laws and regulations ====
When planning and designing major roads, a central divider or fast/slow lane divider should be adopted, with two or more lanes in each direction. Additionally, depending on transportation characteristics and actual road conditions, bus lanes, motorcycle lanes, sidewalks, or bicycle lanes should be established. When planning and designing secondary roads, there should be at least one fast lane and one slow lane in each direction. Additionally, depending on transportation characteristics and actual road conditions, motorcycle lanes or bicycle lanes should be established. Among them, the width of the motorcycle lane shall not be less than 1.5 meters, and the width of the bicycle lane shall not be less than 1.2 meters.

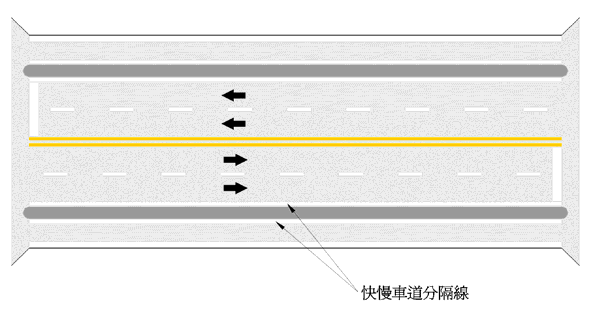
Fast and slow lane separation line on Taiwan roads

The fast and slow lane separation line is used to indicate the outer edge of the fast lane and to divide the boundary between the fast lane and the slow lane. Its line type is a solid white line, and the line width is 10 centimeters.

In a slow lane with a fast and slow lane separation line, if there are no speed limit signs or markings, the speed shall not exceed 40 kilometers per hour. Cars with four or more wheels driving on roads with fast and slow lane separation lines shall not drive in the slow lane, except when starting, preparing to turn, preparing to stop, or temporarily stopping. However, roads equipped with fast and slow lane dividing islands are not subject to this restriction. When a road is equipped with dividing islands separating fast and slow lanes, unless otherwise provided by signs, markings, or signal controls, car drivers shall not make a left turn from the slow lane; otherwise, they will be fined between NT$ 600 and NT$ 1,800.

For lanes where motorcycles travel, if there are no signs or markings, on roads where fast and slow lanes are not separated, they should travel in the two outermost lanes; on one-way streets, they should travel in the leftmost and rightmost lanes. If there are no signs or markings, motorcycles on roads where fast and slow lanes are separated should travel in the outermost fast lane and the slow lane on two-way roads; on one-way roads, they should travel in the slow lane and the fast lane adjacent to the slow lane.

Starting from July 1, 2012, large heavy motorcycles with a total cylinder capacity of 250 cubic centimeters or more shall, in principle, follow the driving regulations applicable to small cars. Slow vehicles should travel in order on the right side of the designated slow lane. On roads without a designated slow lane, they should travel on the right side of the road; otherwise, the driver will be fined between NT$ 300 and NT$ 600.

=== United Kingdom ===
Generally, motorcycles are treated the same as any other vehicle. However, as of January 2012, Transport for London have made the numerous bus lanes in London permanently accessible to motorcyclists, after two trials were undertaken suggesting that this policy will lead to decreased congestion, decreased carbon emissions and safer city center journeys for motorcyclists.

== Safety issues in Malaysia ==
While the design of the motorcycle lanes on some federal roads in Malaysia can be considered as acceptable, the design of motorcycle lanes on expressways is often criticized by Malaysian motorcyclists due to several issues.

=== Design and maintenance ===
The chief reason that had contributed to the design-related criticisms of the segregated motorcycle lanes on expressways is the adoption of the design standards of segregated bicycle lanes, namely the standards defined by Arahan Teknik (Jalan) 10/86: A Guide to the Design of Cycle Track by Malaysian Public Works Department. According to Arahan Teknik (Jalan) 10/86: A Guide to the Design of Cycle Track, the typical design speed limit being applied on cycle tracks is as low as 60 km/h. However, the design speed limit is too low, as the reported 85th percentile operating speeds of motorcyclists along the motorcycle lanes at the Federal Highway during peak hours and non-peak hours are 72 km/h and 80 km/h respectively.

Due to the operating speeds almost the same as the speed limit of the main carriageways itself, T. H. Law et al. (2005) suggest that the minimum width of the segregated motorcycle lane at the Federal Highway should be set at 3.81 m. However, the average width the existing segregated motorcycle lanes, such as that which is located on the Federal Highway, is only two meters wide. The width of the motorcycle lane is too narrow for bigger motorcycles, as well as for the purpose of overtaking.

According to G. Ramasamy, one of the engineers being responsible for the construction of the Federal Highway between 1974 and 1977, he explained that the constructors built a pair of cycle tracks along the highway to segregate the bicycle traffic from the main carriageways. However, he was shocked to find out that the bicycle lanes had ultimately been turned to motorcycle lanes, as those lanes were not designed to accommodate motorcycle traffic.

Motorcyclists exit the motorcycle lane when approaching an interchange via small off-ramps. Sometimes the off-ramps are too narrow for the motorcyclists, especially for bigger motorcycles. Some ramps require motorcyclists to stop and look for the oncoming cars before it is safe to exit the lane. Hence, motorcyclists exiting motorcycle lanes may present the risk of collision from behind.

Every time that a motorcycle lane approaches an interchange, the motorcycle lane passes sharp corners as well as some tunnels. The corners are dangerous for motorcyclists if they are riding at speeds above 35 km/h.

Besides risking the safety of the motorcyclists, the sharp corners near an interchange also significantly increase the traveling distance for motorcyclists. The best example is the Seputeh interchange at the Federal Highway, where motorcyclists from Klang direction who wish to turn to Salak Expressway have to pass two roundabouts, several winding lanes and several tunnels.

Some stretches of the motorcycle lanes are flooded, although the PLUS concessionaire has placed pumps in a tunnel to address the issue. Some stretches may have potholes and also covered with sand which often causes troubles for motorcyclists. The lanes are also poorly illuminated and less monitored.

=== Crime ===
The corners and tunnels of the motorcycle lanes can be potential sites for robbers due to the dark and hidden locations. Due to motorcycle lanes on expressways being completely separated from the main carriageways, motorcyclists have no escape routes from being robbed. There are many reported cases of robberies along motorcycle lanes at Shah Alam Expressway and Federal Highway. As a result, many motorcyclists avoid using motorcycle lanes and only use them during rush hours.

=== Response from the government ===
On 24 April 2013, a video of the poor conditions of the Federal Highway was uploaded to Facebook and went viral throughout blogs and other Facebook pages, including the Ministry of Work's own Facebook page. The uploader, Muhamad Azree from Shah Alam, also reported the matter to the Ministry of Works himself. Due to the virality of the video throughout the Malaysian cyberspace, the newly appointed Minister of Works, Datuk Fadillah Yusof, announced that his ministry will set up a team to resolve the safety issues of the segregated motorcycle lanes along the Federal Highway. In addition, the Chairman of the National Institute of Occupational Safety and Health (Niosh), Tan Sri Lee Lam Thye, urged the agencies under the Ministry of Works to improve the condition of the motorcycle lanes to become safer and more comfortable, in order to encourage motorcyclists to use them.

== See also ==
- Segregated cycle facilities
- Bicycle boulevard
- Malaysian expressway system
- Malaysian Federal Roads system
- Outline of motorcycles and motorcycling
- Road signs in Malaysia
