= Petaling Jaya =

- City
- City of Petaling Jaya Bandaraya Petaling Jaya (Malay)
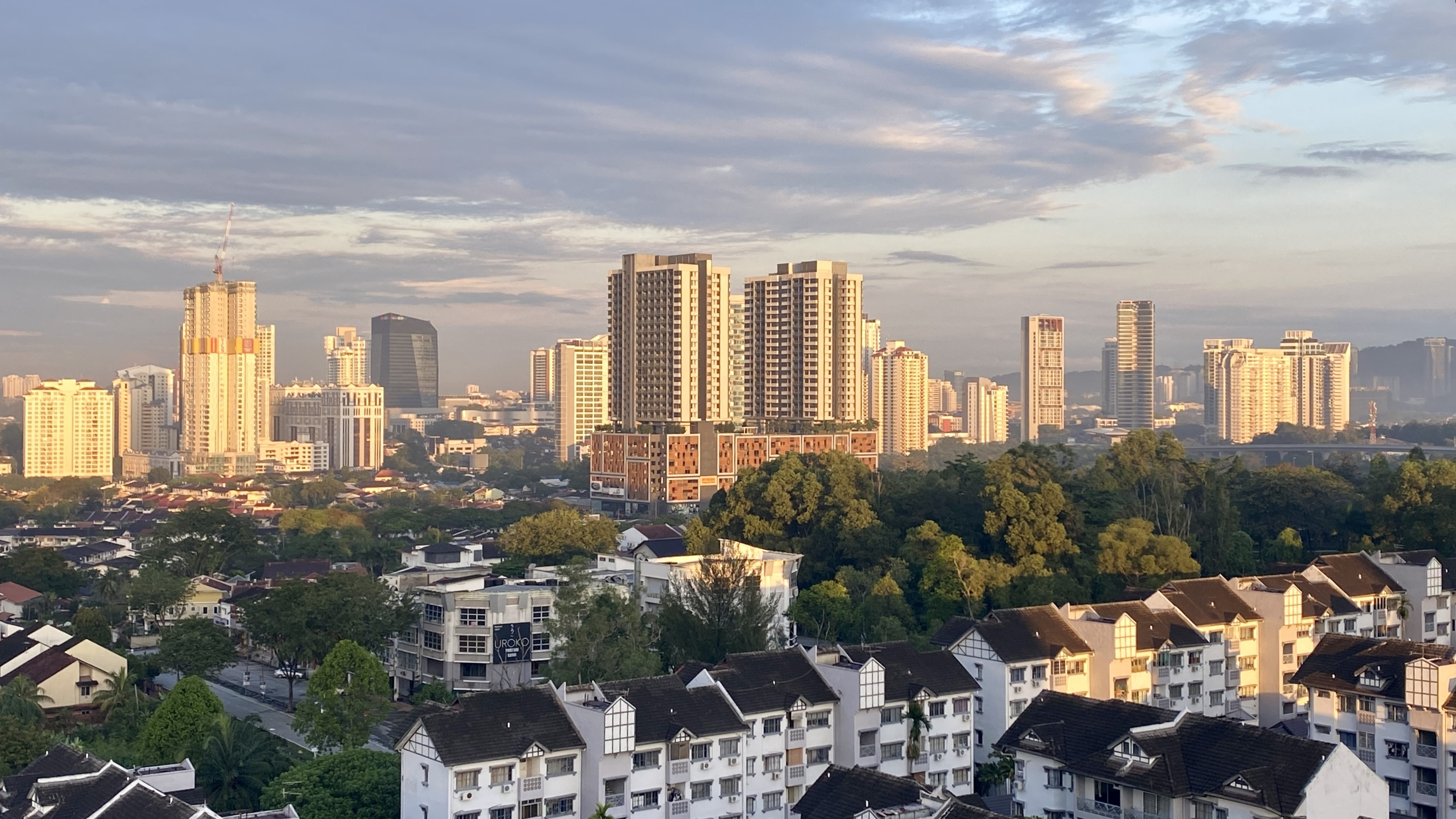
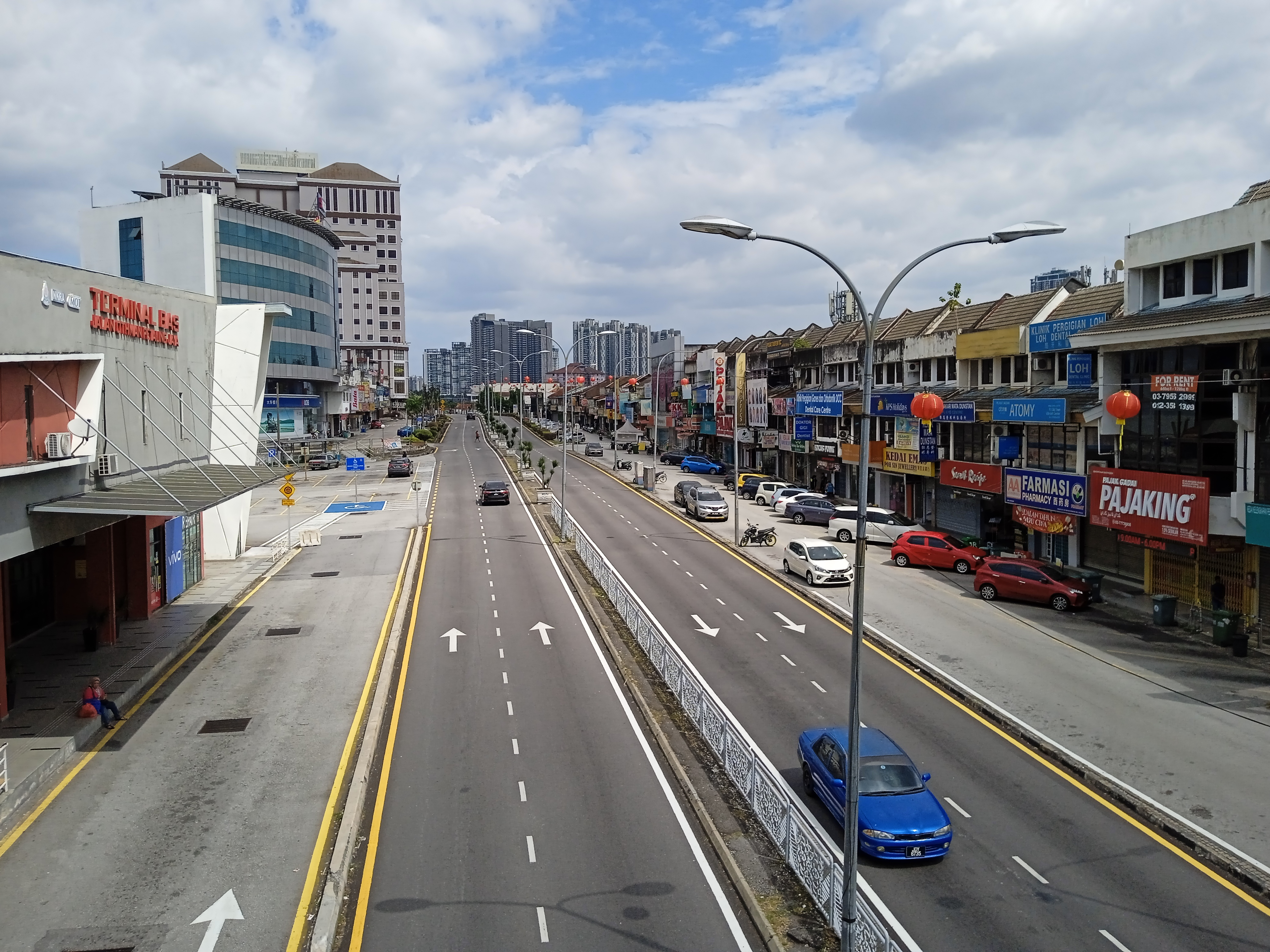
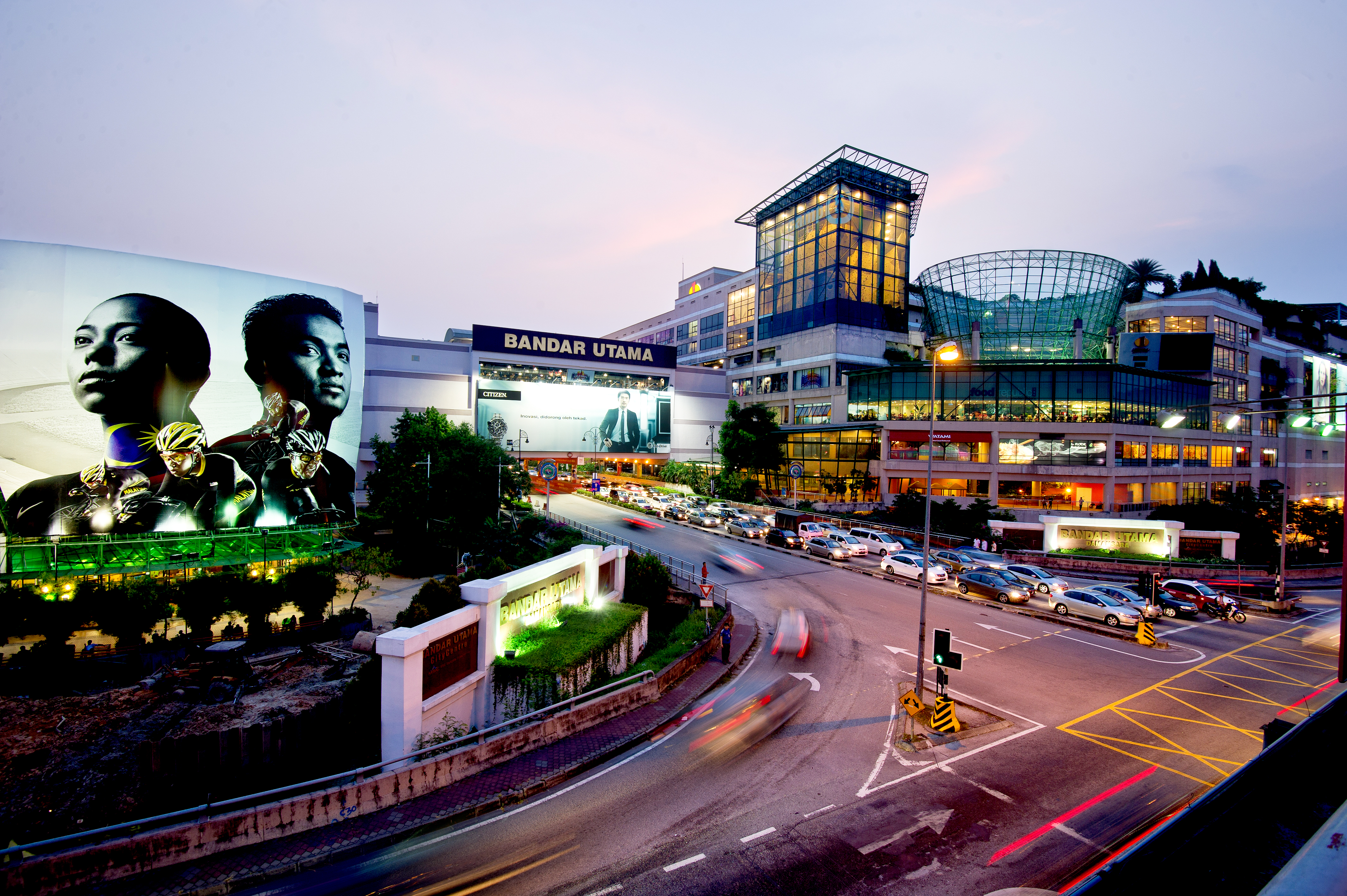
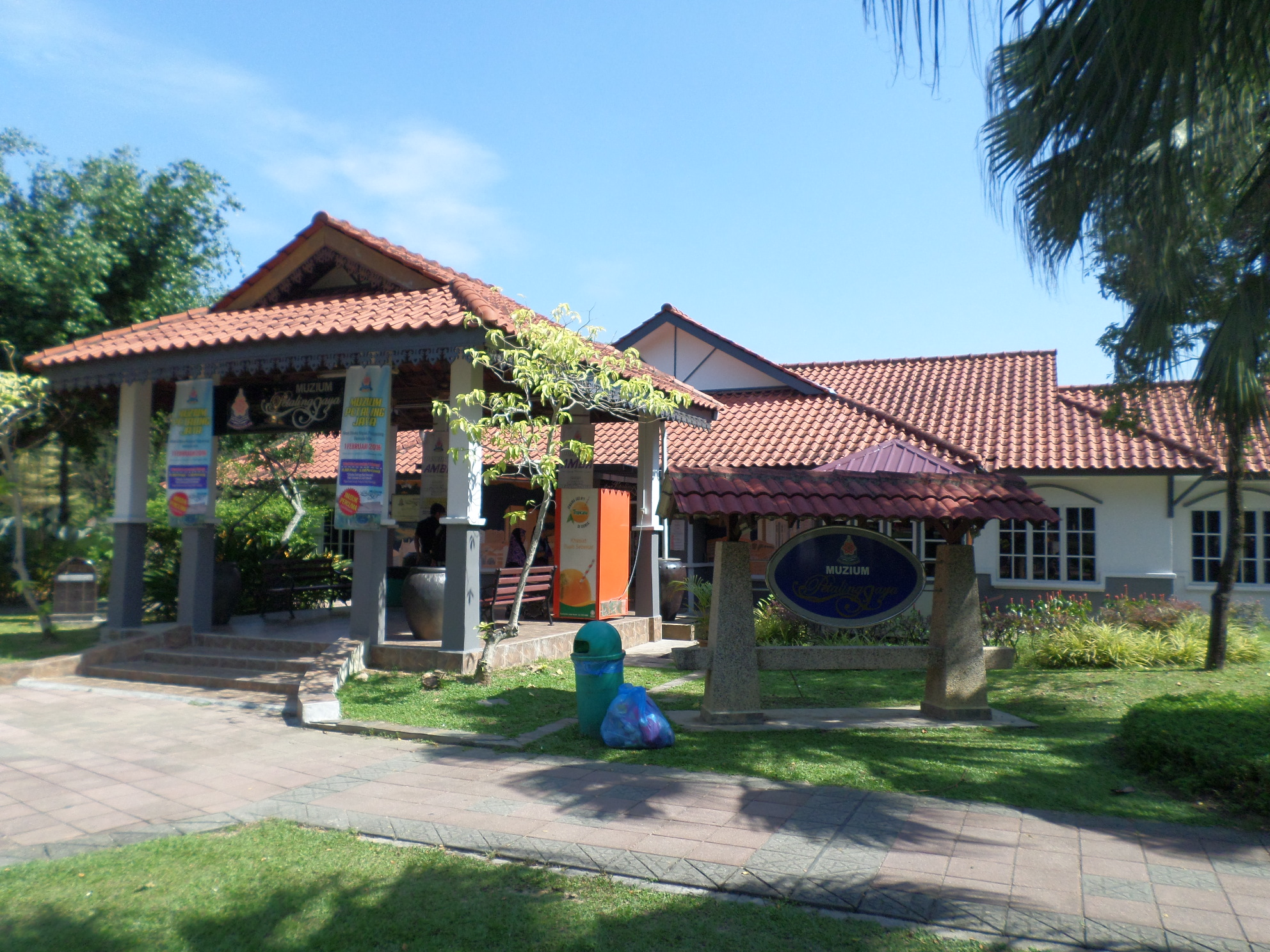
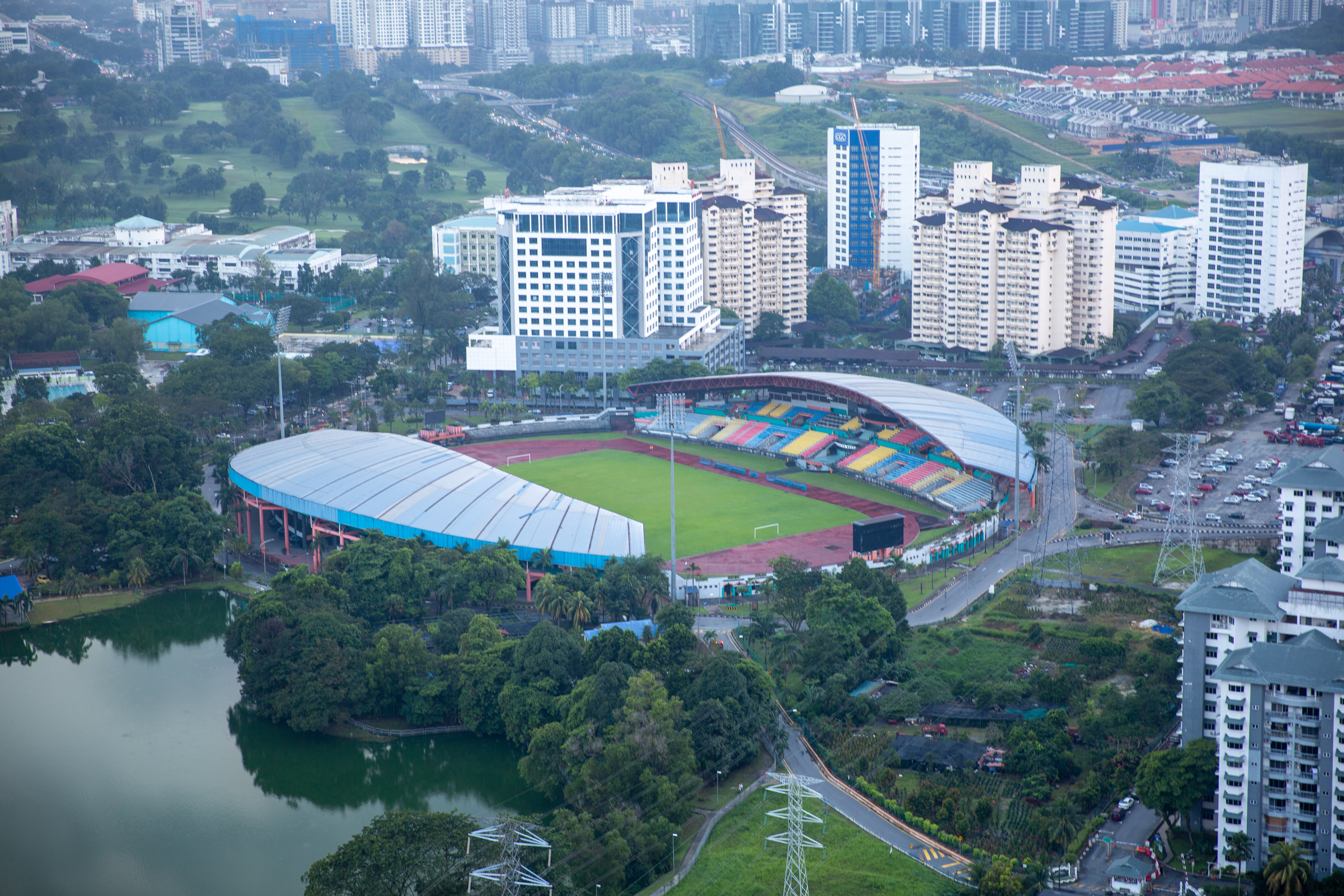
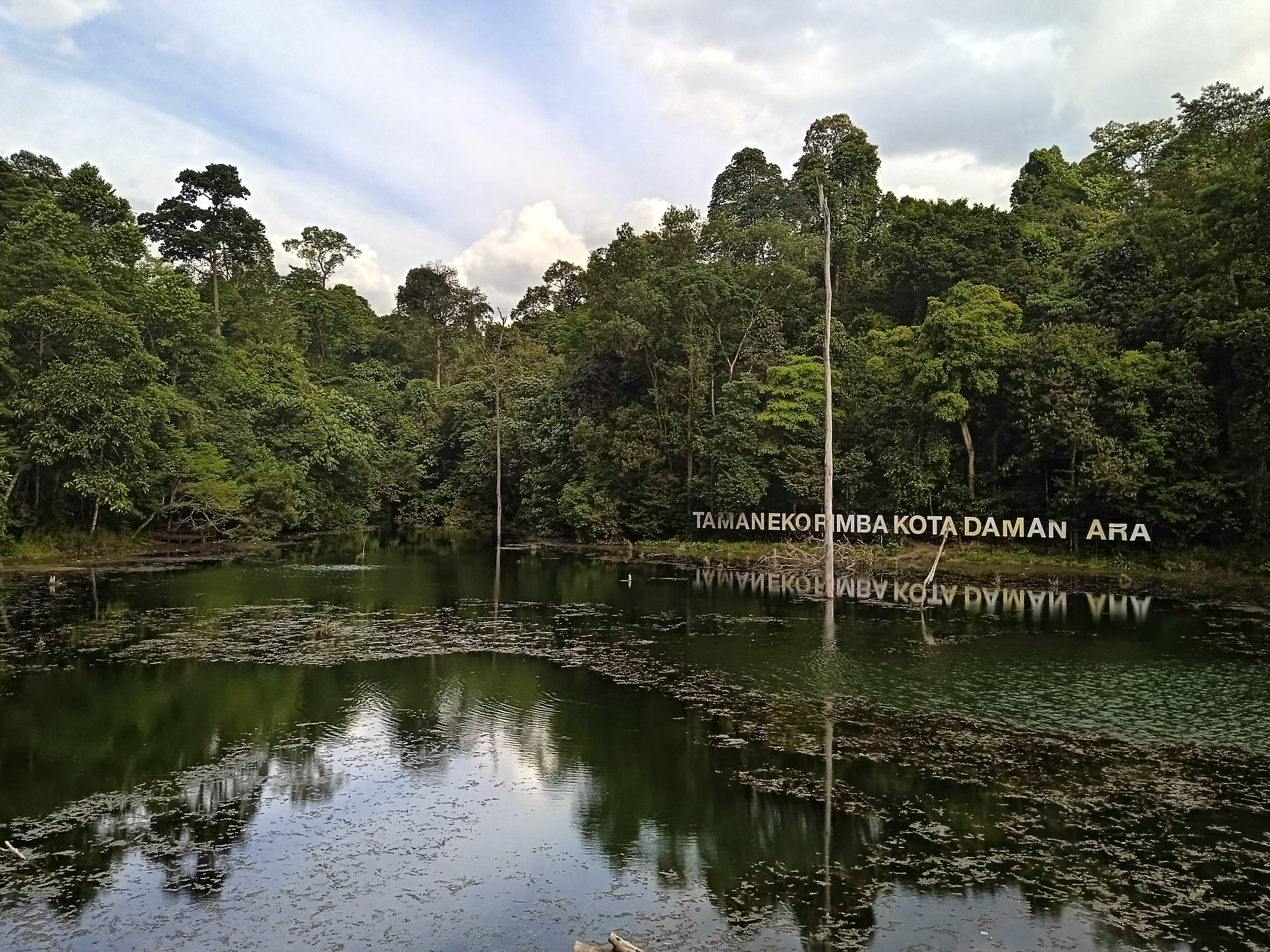
- Skyline of Petaling Jaya Jalan Othman Integrated mall with Bandar Utama Station Petaling Jaya Museum Petaling Jaya Stadium KDC Forest

- Seal
- Nicknames: PJ, The Crape Myrtle City (Bandar Raya Inai Merah)
- Motto: Mesra, Cepat, dan Tepat (English: Friendly, Fast and Precise)
- Location of Petaling Jaya in Selangor
- Petaling Jaya in Selangor Petaling Jaya (Malaysia) Petaling Jaya (Southeast Asia) Petaling Jaya (Asia)
- Coordinates: 03°05′50″N 101°38′40″E
- Country: Malaysia
- State: Selangor
- District: Petaling
- Establishment: 1954
- Municipality status: 1 January 1977
- City status: 20 June 2006

Government
  - Type: City council
  - Body: Petaling Jaya City Council
  - Mayor: Mohamad Zahri Samingon
  - Deputy Mayor: Hjh Sharifah Marhaini Syed

Area
  - Total: 97.2 km^{2} (37.5 sq mi)

Population (January 2024)
  - Total: 807,879
  - Density: 8,310/km^{2} (21,500/sq mi)
- Time zone: UTC+8 (MST)
  - Summer (DST): Not observed
- Postcode: 46xxx, 473xx, 474xx, 478xx, 522xx
- Area codes: +603-56, +603-61, +603-62, +603-7
- Website: www.mbpj.gov.my

Petaling Jaya (Malaysian pronunciation: [pətaliŋ d͡ʒaja]), colloquially referred to as "PJ", is a city in Petaling District, in the state of Selangor, Malaysia. Originally developed as a satellite township for Kuala Lumpur, the capital of Malaysia, it is part of the Greater Kuala Lumpur area. Petaling Jaya was granted city status on 20 June 2006. It has an area of approximately 97.2 square kilometres (37.5 sq mi).

Petaling Jaya is surrounded by Kuala Lumpur to the east, Sungai Buloh to the north, Shah Alam, the capital of Selangor, and Subang Jaya to the west, and Bandar Kinrara (Puchong) to the south.

== History ==
Under plans developed by Francis McWilliams, the city was developed during post-war British Malaya on a 1,200-acre (486 ha) rubber estate, the Effingham Estate, around Old Klang Road to address the overpopulation of the capital Kuala Lumpur in the 1950s. Since 1952, PJ witnessed a dramatic growth in terms of population size and geographical importance. The development of Petaling Jaya commenced in 1952 with the construction of 800 houses centred on the area known as "Old Town" today.

Lieutenant-General Sir Gerald Templer (then the British High Commissioner of Malaya and Petaling District council chairman) planned for Petaling Jaya to be a satellite town to prevent people from assisting the communists; the earlier housing areas were fenced off from the surrounding area. The first two main roads built in Petaling Jaya were simply called "Jalan 1" or Road 1 and "Jalan 2" or Road 2. Road 1 was later named Jalan Templer after former British High Commissioner in Malaya, Sir Gerald Templer, while Road 2 was named Jalan Othman.

Until the end of 1953, the town was administered by the Kuala Lumpur district officer. The Petaling Jaya Town Authority headed by N.A.J. Kennedy commenced administering Petaling Jaya in 1954. On 24 August 1959, Encik Abdul Aziz bin Haji Mohd Ali became the first Malayan to head the PJ Authority. Administratively and historically, it was considered part of Kuala Lumpur. However, Petaling Jaya ceased to be part of Kuala Lumpur when the latter became a Federal Territory on 1 February 1974. It then became a township in its own right within the state of Selangor.

Petaling Garden Berhad was the pioneer private development company, responsible for the development of some areas of Petaling Jaya. It was started in 1957 by a group of Chinese businessmen including Ang Toon Chew, Robert Kuok, Tan Kim Yeow, Tan Chin Nam, Ho Yeow Khoon and Low Boon Chian. The company went on to develop thousands of acres in Petaling Jaya more specifically, Section 5, 6 and 17, to become the townships Taman Petaling Klang and Sri Petaling to name a few. Petaling Garden was brought to the Kuala Lumpur Stock Exchange and became one of the first publicly listed Property Development Companies in Malaysia. The company was bought over by Permodalan Nasional Berhad (PNB) in the year 2007, it was valued at RM 964 million at time of purchase.

Southern Petaling Jaya, from Section 8 to PJ Old Town, had the first settlements that were established around 1953. Across the Federal Highway in the 1950s, Northern Petaling Jaya was further developed with industrial lots. The first shopping complex in Petaling Jaya was Jaya Shopping Centre (better known as Jaya Supermarket). Built in 1974, it is located in Section 14.

On 1 January 1977, following the passing of the Local Government Act the previous year, the Petaling Jaya Town Authority was reorganised to become Petaling Jaya Municipal Council or Majlis Perbandaran Petaling Jaya (MPPJ). Petaling Jaya progressed rapidly due to the massive rural-urban migration. As more people from rural areas immigrated, Sungai Way and Subang districts along with areas such as Subang Jaya, Seksyen 52 (New Town or colloquially known as "State", the name of the first, former cinema in the area) developed in areas under the jurisdiction of the municipality.

Evolution of Petaling Jaya's borders since 1977

Following a boundary realignment exercise in January 1997, parts of Petaling Jaya including Subang Jaya, USJ, Putra Heights, and Bandar Sunway were ceded to the newly formed Subang Jaya Municipal Council or MPSJ at the time. In exchange, the MPPJ annexed Bandar Utama, Sungai Buloh, Bukit Lanjan, and Kota Damansara from the Petaling District Council (Majlis Daerah Petaling, MDP), which disestablished itself after the cession.

Due to the proximity of the city to the capital of Malaysia, Petaling Jaya had and have been the headquarters of many federal government departments such as the Jabatan Pendaftaran Negara (National Registration Department, 1958–2004), the Jabatan Arkib Negara Malaysia (Malaysian National Archive Department, 1961–1982), and the Jabatan Kimia Malaysia (Malaysian Chemistry Department, 1957–).

=== COVID-19 pandemic ===
In 2020, the city was part of the nationwide COVID-19 lockdown, or the movement control order (MCO), where residents were confined to their homes and only allowed out for essential purposes.

On 27 April, the market in the city's oldest quarter, Old Town, was shut down after a seafood trader there tested positive for the virus, prompting health authorities to call for customers to get themselves screened.

Less than two weeks later, large parts of Old Town came under a full government lockdown on 10 May after the discovery of 26 COVID-19 cases from the market area. Over 2,900 people in the quarter were fenced in and prevented from leaving the area, as authorities cordoned off 40ha of the area with barbed wire from the rest of the city. Scheduled to last until 23 May, the lockdown was eventually lifted on 21 May.

After a lull in cases thanks to a nationwide lifting of restrictions, the city began to see a rise in cases in October following a spike in virus infections after infections rose in the eastern state of Sabah, where elections were held in September.

Over 800 people working at the Tropicana Golf and Country Resort were barred from leaving their hostel, as authorities put the compound under a total lockdown. Five people there tested positive for COVID-19, including two who had just returned from the eastern state of Sabah.

In the first two weeks of the month, at least four malls in the city reported COVID-19 infections. This included the 1Utama shopping mall, which was ordered to close for seven days from 12 October.

Meanwhile, a teacher at the Taman Sea secondary school also tested positive for the virus on 7 October, leading students and staff members there to self-quarantine. A few days later, education authorities in the country ordered 298 schools in Selangor state's Petaling district, which include Petaling Jaya, Shah Alam and Subang Jaya, to shut down from 12 October to 25 October as COVID-19 cases in the country rose.

== Climate ==
Petaling Jaya is one of the wettest cities in Malaysia. It is warm with an average maximum of 30 degrees Celsius and receives heavy rainfall all year round, roughly more than 3,300 mm (130 in) of average rainfall annually. The city has no particular true dry season, but June and July are the driest months. Mostly each month average rainfall receives more than 200 mm (7.9 in). Thunderstorms and extreme rainstorms are common, and it is one of the highest lightning strike areas in the world. But due to normal global temperature variations, Petaling Jaya is experiencing severe drought with frequent water rationing among neighbourhoods.

Climate data for Petaling Jaya
Month	Jan	Feb	Mar	Apr	May	Jun	Jul	Aug	Sep	Oct	Nov	Dec	Year
Mean daily maximum °C (°F)	32.5 (90.5)	33.3 (91.9)	33.5 (92.3)	33.5 (92.3)	33.4 (92.1)	33.1 (91.6)	32.6 (90.7)	32.7 (90.9)	32.5 (90.5)	32.5 (90.5)	32.1 (89.8)	31.9 (89.4)	32.8 (91.0)
Daily mean °C (°F)	27.8 (82.0)	28.4 (83.1)	28.7 (83.7)	28.9 (84.0)	28.9 (84.0)	28.7 (83.7)	28.2 (82.8)	28.2 (82.8)	28.1 (82.6)	28.1 (82.6)	27.9 (82.2)	27.7 (81.9)	28.3 (83.0)
Mean daily minimum °C (°F)	23.1 (73.6)	23.5 (74.3)	23.8 (74.8)	24.2 (75.6)	24.4 (75.9)	24.2 (75.6)	23.7 (74.7)	23.7 (74.7)	23.7 (74.7)	23.7 (74.7)	23.6 (74.5)	23.4 (74.1)	23.8 (74.8)
Average rainfall mm (inches)	189.8 (7.47)	210.1 (8.27)	273.5 (10.77)	298.9 (11.77)	243.1 (9.57)	128.7 (5.07)	141.1 (5.56)	168.9 (6.65)	198.1 (7.80)	280.1 (11.03)	330.3 (13.00)	261.2 (10.28)	2,723.8 (107.24)
Average rainy days (≥ 1.0 mm)	11	12	16	16	14	9	10	11	13	17	18	15	162
Source: World Meteorological Organisation

== Governance ==
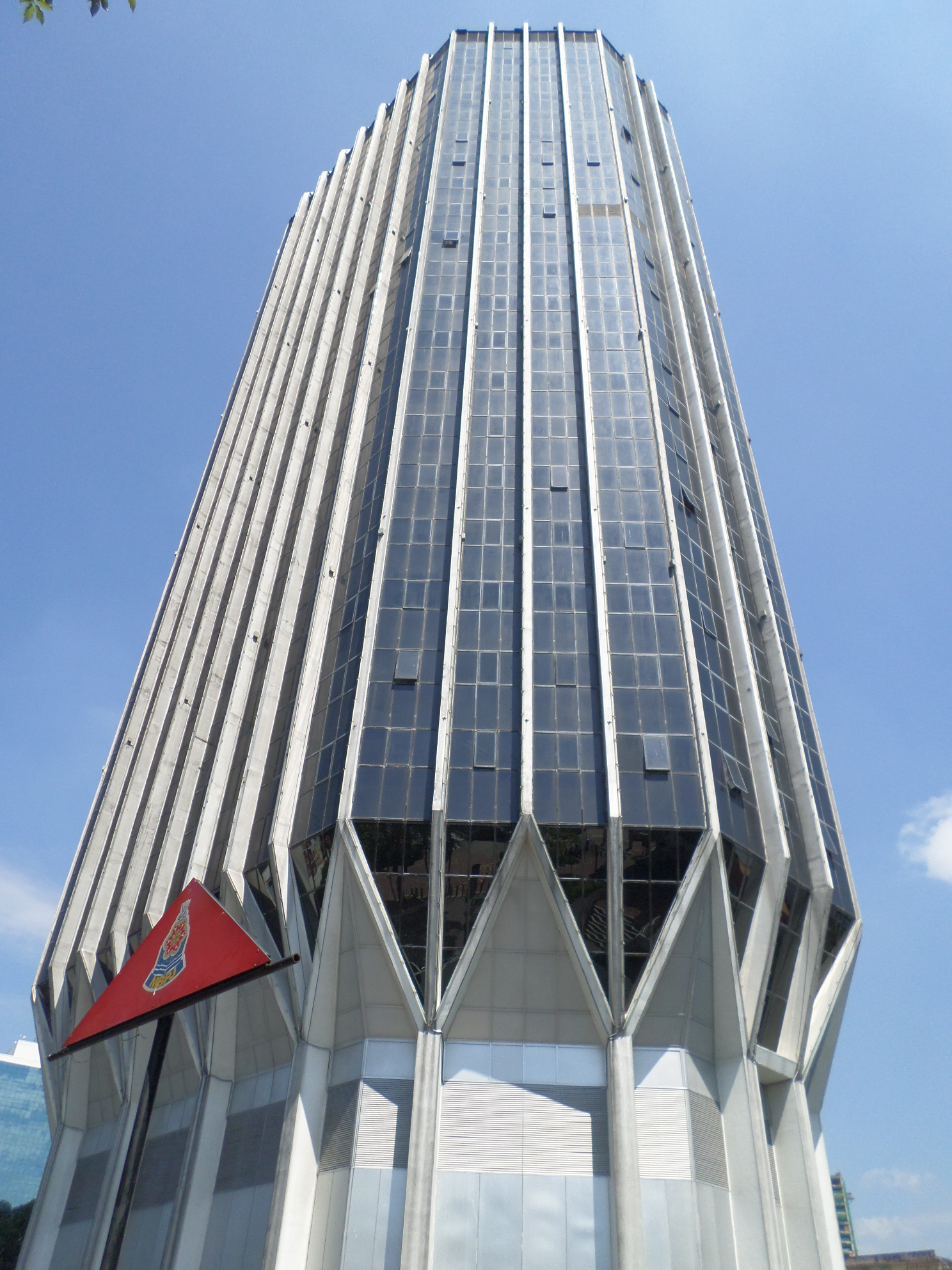
Petaling Jaya City Council

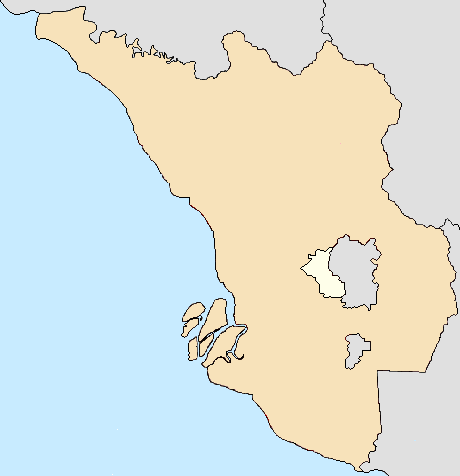
Locations of Petaling Jaya and its suburbs

The local administration of Petaling Jaya is carried out by Petaling Jaya City Council (Majlis Bandaraya Petaling Jaya, MBPJ), formerly known as Petaling Jaya Authority from 1954 until 1977 and Petaling Jaya Municipal Council (Majlis Perbandaran Petaling Jaya, MPPJ) from 1977 until 2006. Six mayors have been appointed since Petaling Jaya was awarded city status on 20 June 2006. The current mayor is Mohamad Azhan Md. Azmir, who has been in office since 21 October 2021.

The residents of Petaling Jaya are served by four Members of Parliament from Pakatan Harapan, which is DAP's Gobind Singh Deo in Damansara, PKR's Lee Chean Chung in Petaling Jaya, PKR's Ramanan Ramakrishnan in Sungai Buloh and PKR's Wong Chen in Subang.

== City sections ==
Petaling Jaya city sections

Petaling Jaya is divided into several sections. Some are subdivided into smaller neighbourhoods (kejiranan), for example SS5D. Some sections have their own names (SS1 as Kampung Tunku), while other sections are grouped together (SS3, SS4, SS5, SS6 and SS7 as part of Kelana Jaya). Besides that, Petaling Jaya also comprises the affluent township of Damansara. Notably, SS does not stand for 'Seksyen'; rather it is the acronym for Sungai Way-Subang.

== Demographics ==
As of the 2020 census, Petaling Jaya had a population of 771,687. In January 2024, the City Council of Petaling Jaya estimated that the city has a population of 807,879. With a population density of 8,300 inhabitants per square kilometre (22,000/sq mi), it is one of the most densely populated cities in the country.

Petaling Jaya is one of the most ethnically diverse cities in the country, which includes the country's three major ethnic groups: the Malays, the Chinese, and the Indians, although the city also has a mix of different cultures including Eurasians, Kadazans, Ibans and other Indigenous races from around Malaysia.

Ethnicities of Petaling Jaya – 2020 Census
Ethnic group	Percent
Bumiputera	44.4%
Chinese	43.8%
Indians	10.9%
Others	0.8%
Population by percentage This excludes non-citizens which form 8.4% of Petaling Jaya's population

== Landmarks ==
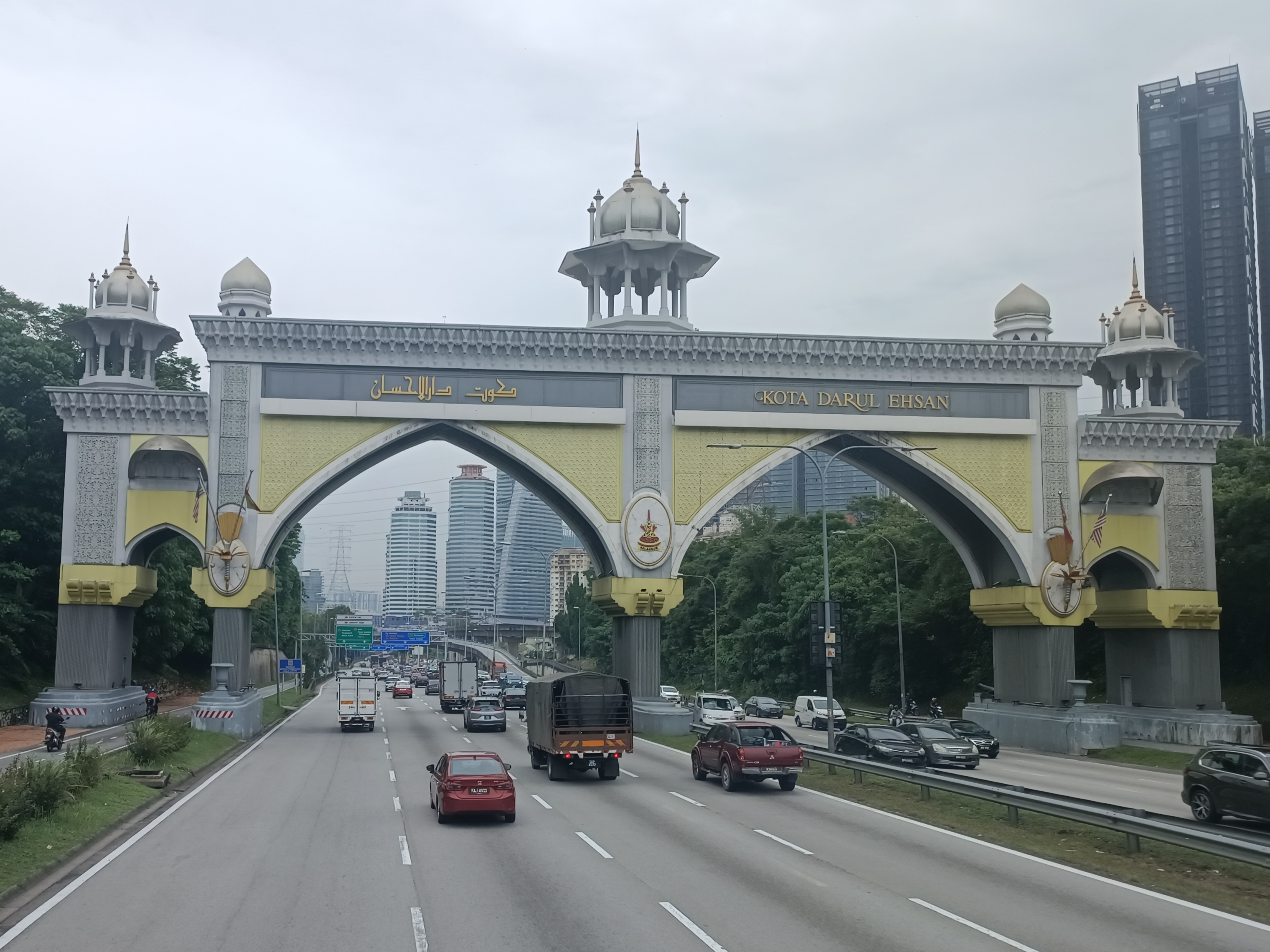
The Kota Darul Ehsan arch over the Federal Highway, marking the entrance to Petaling Jaya from Kuala Lumpur.

A prominent landmark in PJ is the Kota Darul Ehsan arch which symbolically marks the boundary between Kuala Lumpur and Petaling Jaya. This arch straddled the Federal Highway (Lebuhraya Persekutuan) which was originally the only highway link between Petaling Jaya and Kuala Lumpur. However, many links now exist as alternatives to the congested Federal Highway.

Close to the Kelana Jaya Line's Taman Jaya station is the Petaling Jaya Museum, as well as the Thai Wat Chetawan temple. This ornate building is very popular amongst the Buddhist community. A short drive ahead is PJ State, the nickname for the Central Business District of Petaling Jaya with the landmark Menara MBPJ as a focal point. PJ State is more formally referred to as PJ New Town or the Civic Core, serving as the administrative hub of the city.

Beyond the administrative centre, Petaling Jaya has several other key development nodes that serve as local landmarks. Petaling Jaya Old Town (Sections 1–4) is recognized as the Historical Node, retaining the original Garden City layout with green open spaces from the city's inception in the 1950s.

The city is also known for its major commercial landmarks. Bandar Utama is a key regional economic node, home to 1 Utama, one of the largest shopping malls in Malaysia. To the north, the Mutiara Damansara area forms an International Tourism Corridor featuring attractions such as The Curve and IKEA. For recreation, the Kota Damansara Community Forest Park serves as a significant ecological landmark and green lung for the northern part of the city.

== Economy ==
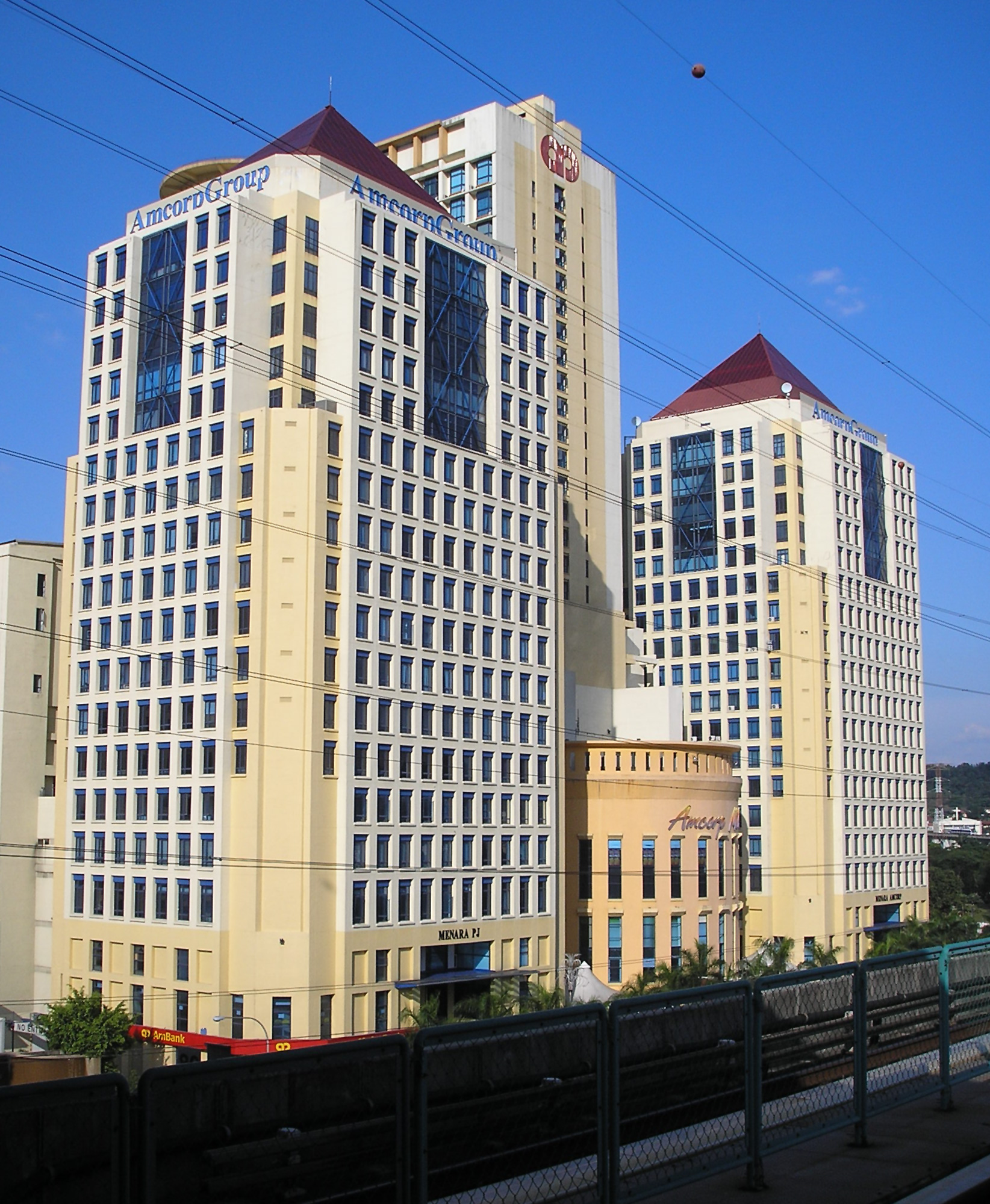
The Amcorp Mall & Business Centre as seen from the Taman Jaya LRT station.

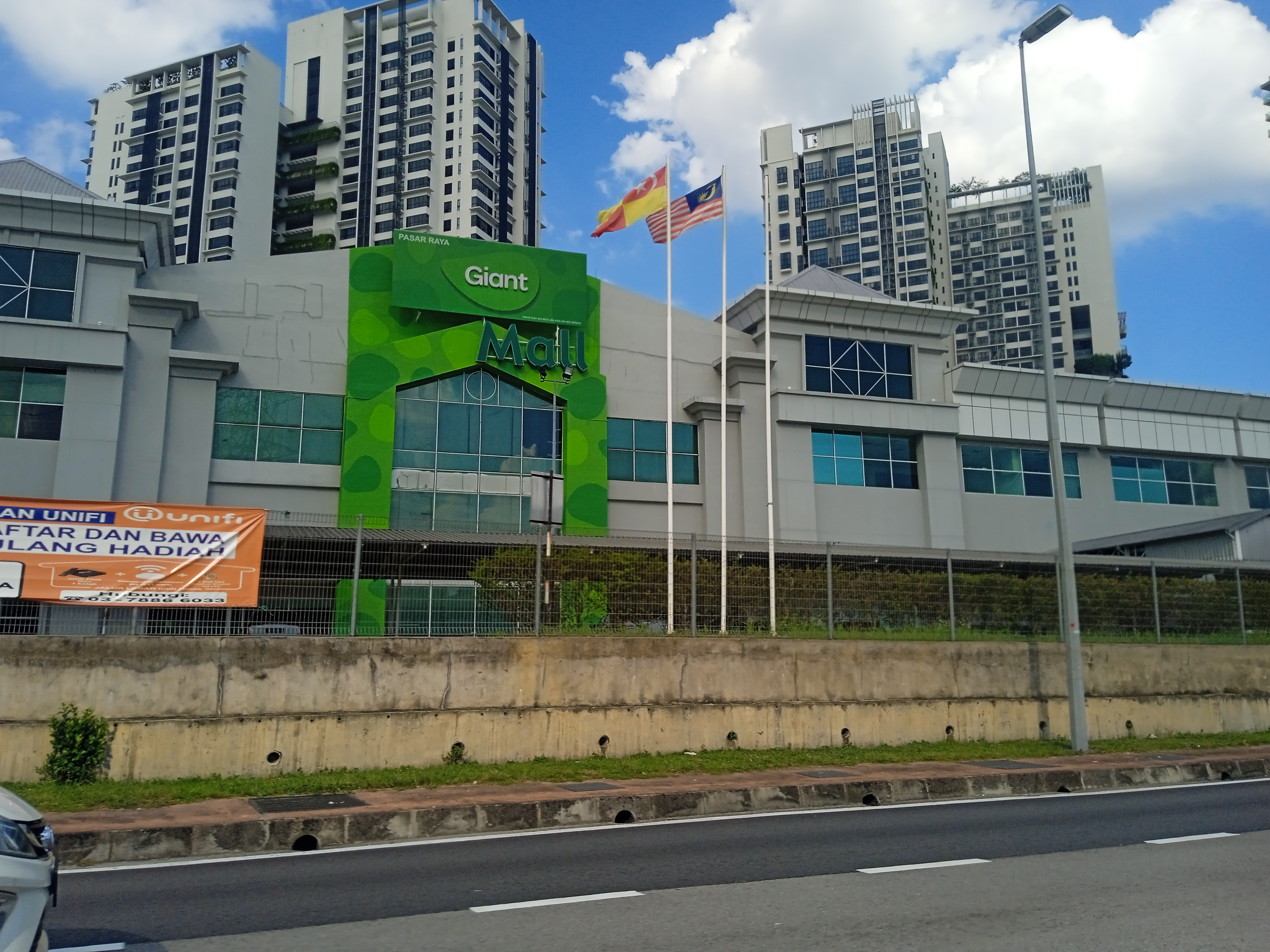
Giant Hypermarket Kelana Jaya

The 1980s saw the establishment of shopping malls like The Atria in Damansara Jaya and Subang Parade in the nearby suburb or satellite town of Subang Jaya. The Atria provided the opportunity for residents to patronise either the Japanese Kimisawa or the French Printemps department stores, as well as a Burger King restaurant.

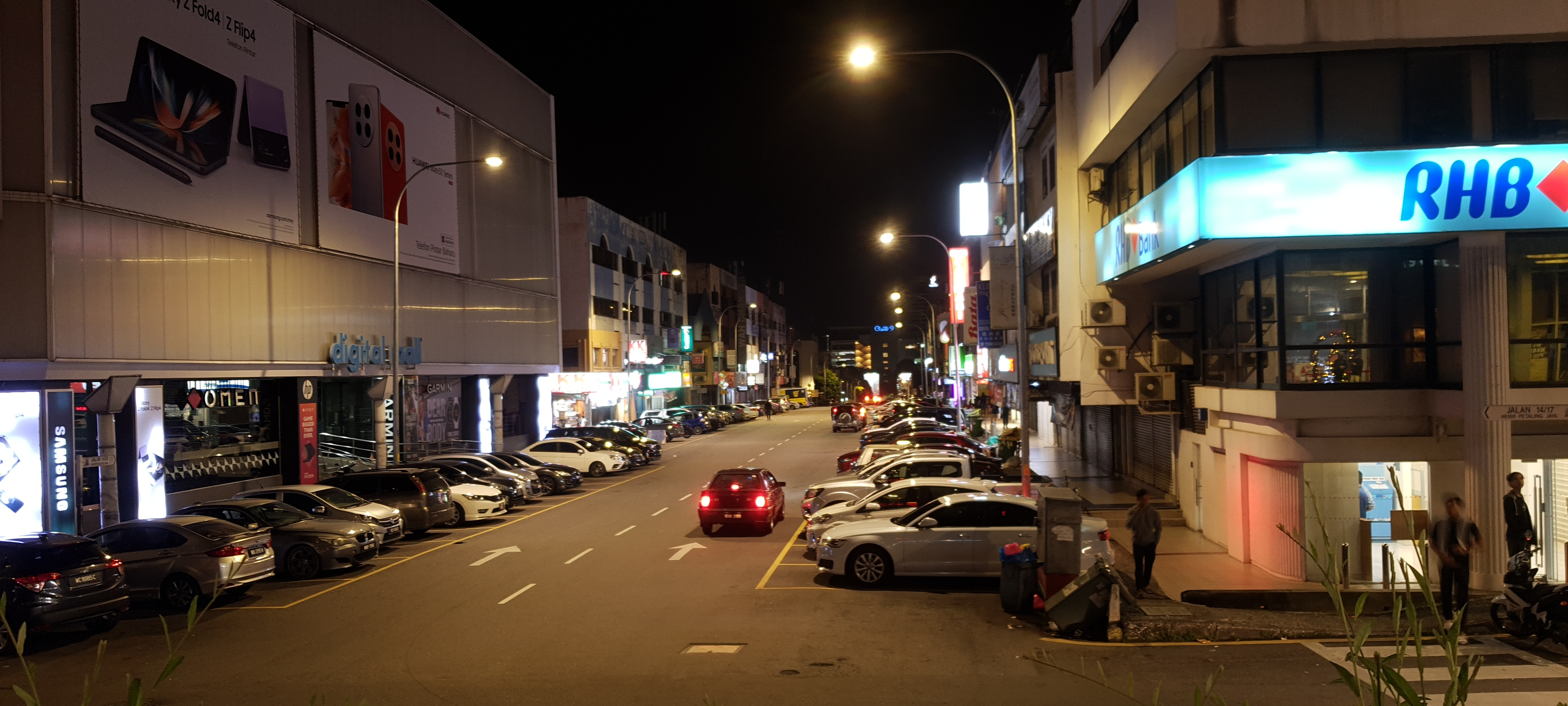
The commercial area in Seksyen 14 Petaling Jaya at night.

In 1995, 1 Utama commenced operations at Bandar Utama. Jaya Jusco (rebranded as Aeon in 2012), a Japanese department store which had operated since 1984 at Taman Tun Dr Ismail later relocated as one of the anchor tenants of 1 Utama.

Lotus's (formerly Tesco) supermarket commenced operations in Mutiara Damansara in 2003. This was quickly followed by the Ikano Power Centre (now renamed as IPC Shopping Centre) in 2004 and The Curve in 2005. At about the same time, the 1 Utama new wing had commenced operations, which then became the largest shopping mall in Malaysia (or currently the 10th largest shopping mall in the world).

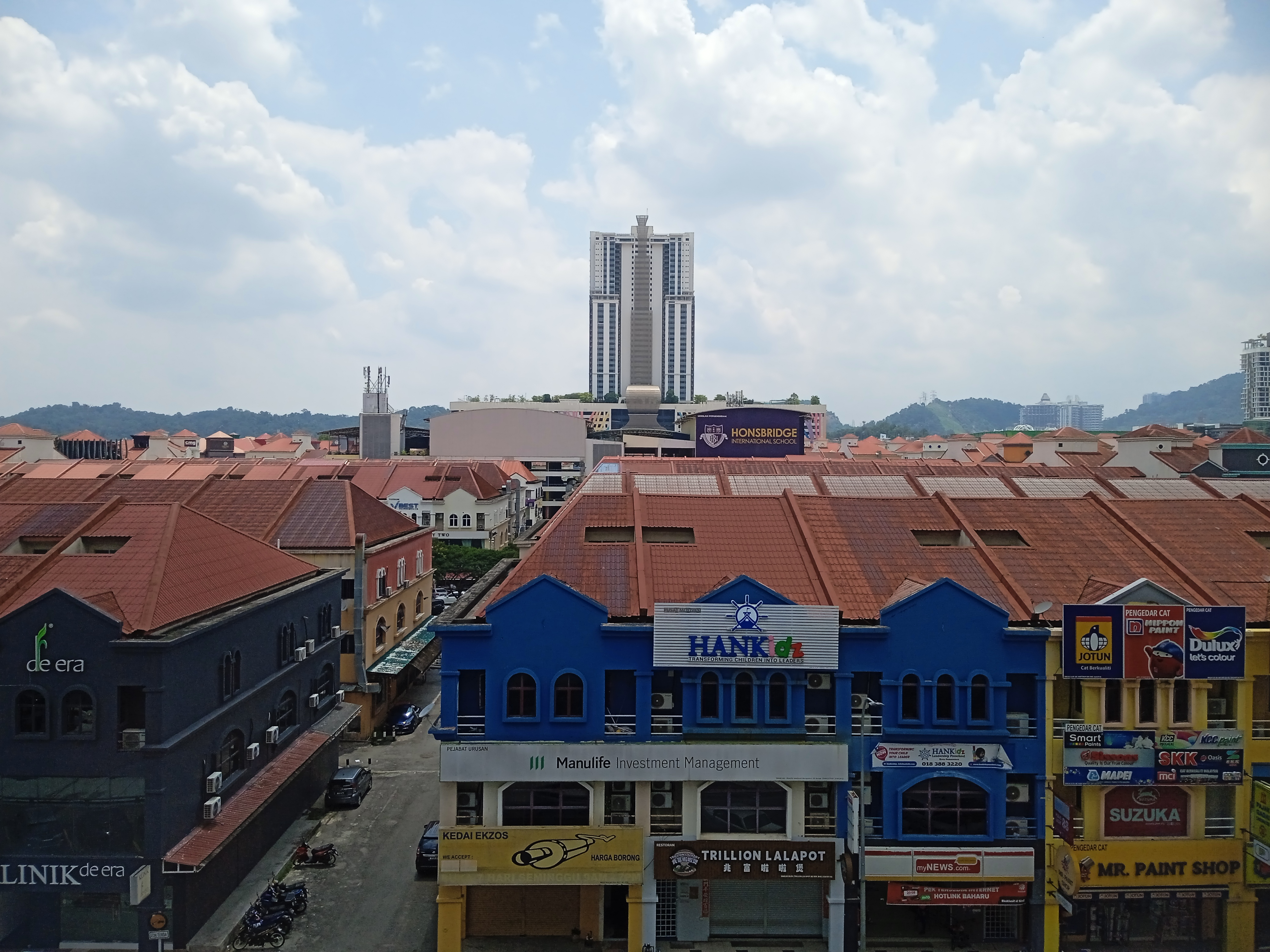
The Dataran Sunway commercial hub in Kota Damansara, Petaling Jaya

In 2004, Giant Hypermarket commenced operations in Kelana Jaya. This complex houses the Giant Hypermarket and some shops to create a more shopping centre style. It was easily accessed off the Damansara–Puchong Expressway. It was eventually closed down permanently on 26 November 2023 as the land was bought by a developer to make way for a new condominium. Located right opposite across the LDP is Paradigm Mall, which opened in mid-2012. Paradigm Mall was developed by WCT on the former Kelana Jaya garbage landfill.

More recently in 2025, Petaling Jaya continued experiencing rapid commercial development with the opening of Sunway Square Mall in Bandar Sunway. The mall (that was previously pet-friendly) houses Southeast Asia's largest 24-hour bookstore: The Library by BookXcess. On 3 December 2025, Hextar World at Empire City opened its door to the public and boasts an indoor ice rink and aims to be a cultural, creative and entertainment hub in Damansara.

Cambridge Analytica claimed to have an office in Kota Damansara; checks shown that the reported address was used for residential purpose.

== Properties in Petaling Jaya ==
Active property developers in Petaling Jaya are PKNS, Sunway Bhd, Tropicana Bhd, AmCorp, Mah Sing Group and Guocoland as well as many others. Due to the size of Petaling Jaya township, property development in the area also includes small to medium-sized developers such as Sri Aman Development and Nusmetro.

Before the rapid development and commercialisation of Petaling Jaya, there were only a handful of residential developments that comprises mostly low to medium-cost apartments as well as terrace houses. By 2005, luxurious condominiums, semi-detached houses, and bungalows are a common sight within the area. These high-end properties are mostly located at Bukit Gasing, Section 16 & 17, SS7 Kelana Jaya, and more recent ones such as Tropicana, and Ara Damansara.

== Transport ==
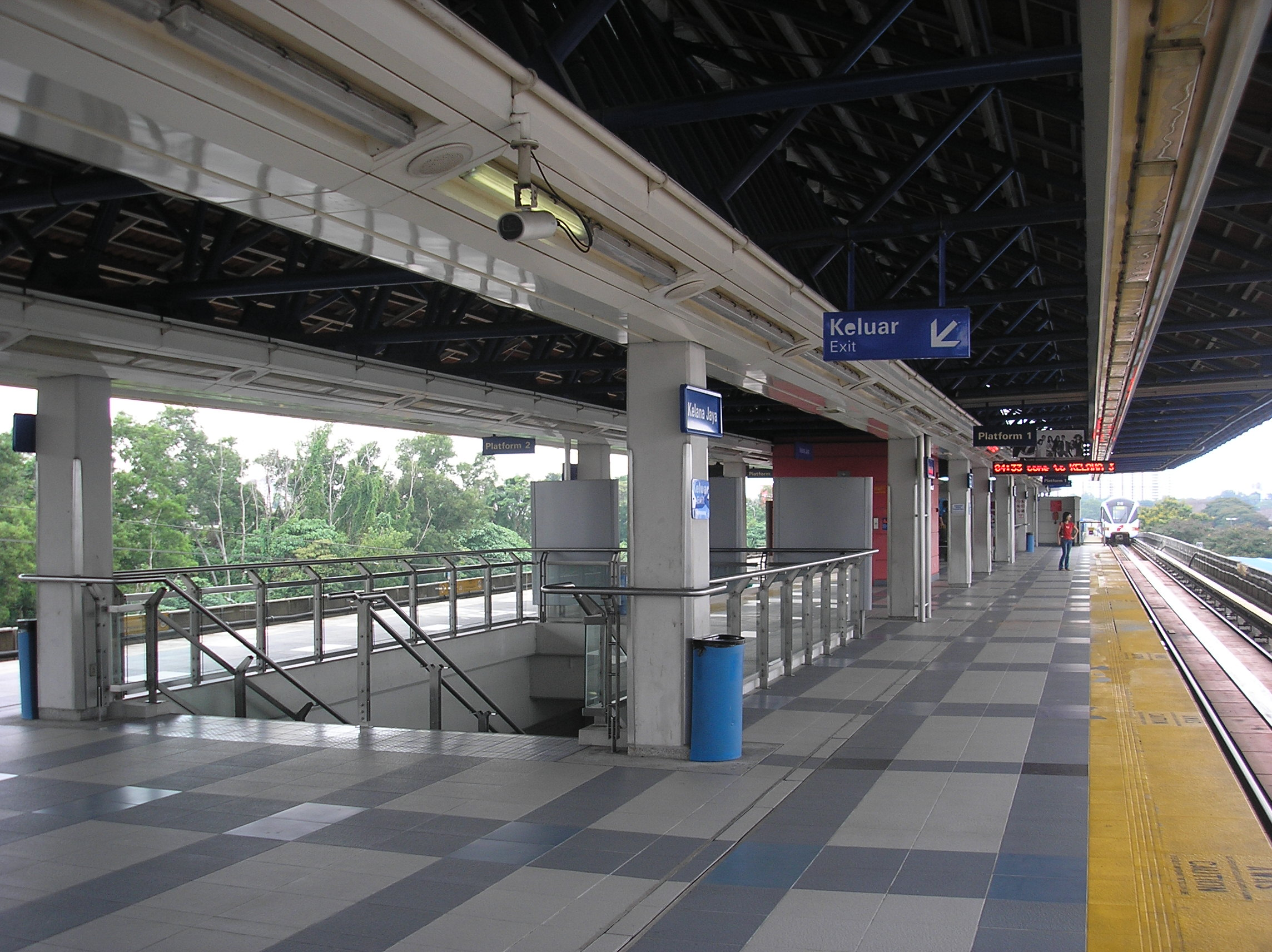
The Kelana Jaya LRT station on the Kelana Jaya Line

=== Bus ===
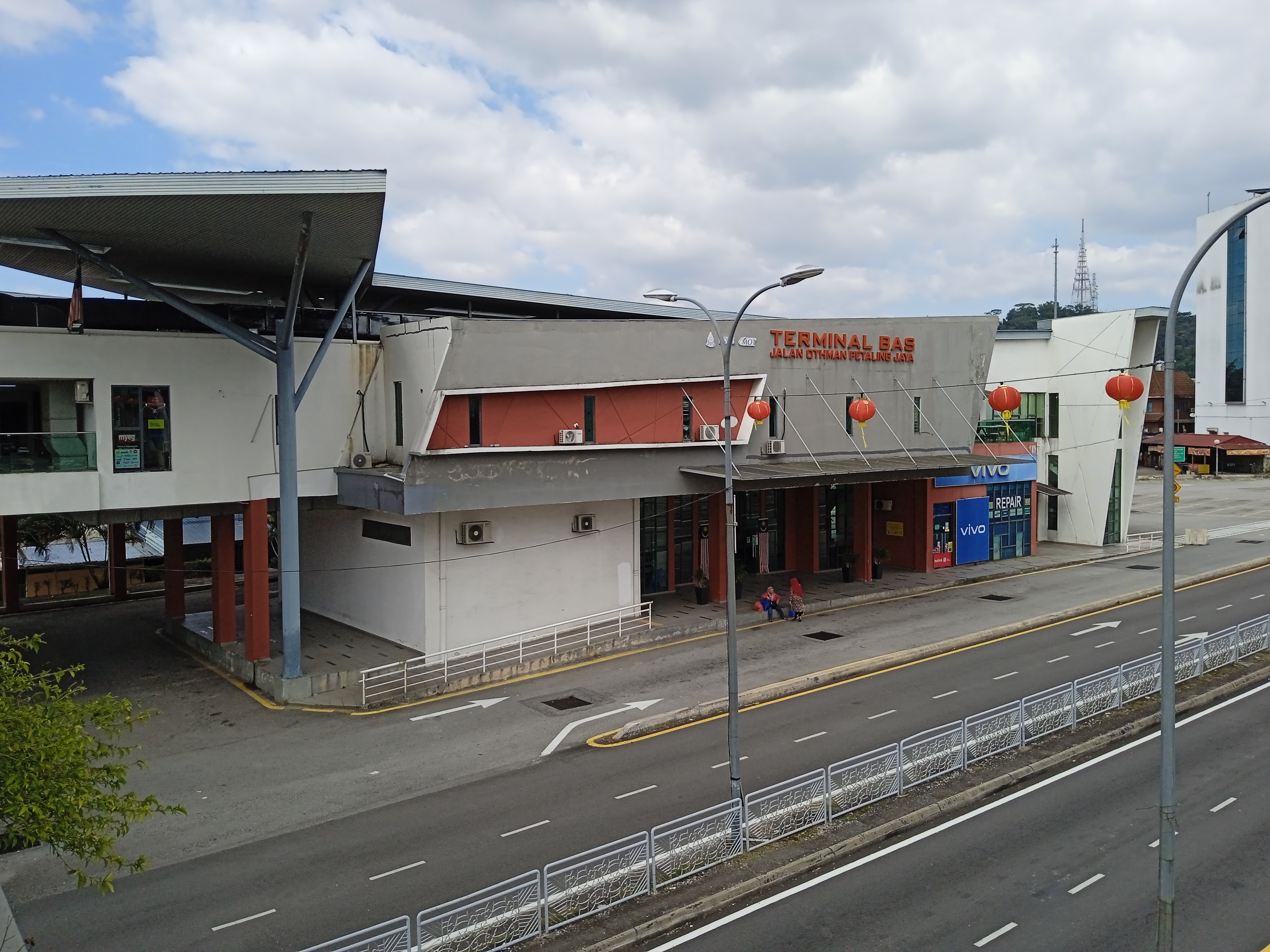
Jalan Othman Bus Terminal (Terminal Bas Jalan Othman), served Petaling Jaya with Rapid KL's bus route 782 and T640

Bus services were initially provided by Sri Jaya between the early 1950s until the early 1990s. Some SEA Park residents may recall the old Sri Jaya Leyland Albion buses on the No. 241 service struggling to climb the relatively steep Jalan 21/1.

The introduction of the IntraKota bus system by DRB-HICOM saw the replacement of Sri Jaya and the mini-buses by the early 1990s. Around the same time, some of the Petaling Jaya-Kuala Lumpur bus routes were serviced by Metrobus.

The introduction of the PUTRA-LRT light rapid transit service in 1998 saw the addition of the Putraline feeder bus services.

The ownership of the PUTRA-LRT and its Putraline feeder bus services, as well as the IntraKota bus system, were taken over by Prasarana Malaysia in 2002 and 2004 respectively, eventually transferring all rail and bus operations to the Rapid KL system. Today, most of the public transportation in the form of busses in Petaling Jaya is operated by Rapid Bus under the Rapid KL brand, which also operates bus services in Kuala Lumpur and the rest of the Klang Valley area. Rapid Bus also operates the PJ City Bus, a free bus service funded by the Petaling Jaya City Council.

=== Rail ===
There are currently one commuter rail line and four rapid transit lines serving Petaling Jaya. These lines also provide connections to a bus rapid transit line and an inter-city rail service.

The 2 Tanjung Malim-Port Klang Line, a commuter rail service operated by KTM Komuter, mainly serves southern Petaling Jaya via Petaling, Jalan Templer, Kampung Dato Harun, Seri Setia and Setia Jaya stations. At the Setia Jaya, the KTM Komuter line is connected to the B1 BRT Sunway Line. (Sunway-Setia Jaya station).

The 5 LRT Kelana Jaya Line, previously named as PUTRA-LRT line, currently operated by Rapid Rail under the Rapid KL brand, has a total of seven stations serving central and southern Petaling Jaya, which are the Taman Jaya, Asia Jaya, Taman Paramount, Taman Bahagia, Kelana Jaya, Lembah Subang and Ara Damansara stations.

The 9 MRT Kajang Line and 12 MRT Putrajaya Line which opened in 2017 and 2022 respectively, serve the northern part of Petaling Jaya's municipal area, also known as Damansara. The stations of Kota Damansara, Surian, Mutiara Damansara and Bandar Utama are served by the Kajang Line, while Damansara Damai, Sri Damansara Barat, Sri Damansara Sentral and Sri Damansara Timur are served by the Putrajaya Line.

The 11 LRT Shah Alam Line serves six out of the 25 stations in central and western Petaling Jaya, comprising the stations of Bandar Utama (connecting to the Kajang Line), Kayu Ara, BU 11, Damansara Idaman, and Subang. All of the stations were opened on 29 June 2026 (apart from Tropicana which is a future in-fill station, set to be operational in 2031) after almost half-a-decade of delays from its original planned opening.

Despite their names, the Sungai Buloh and Kepong Sentral stations are both located within the Petaling Jaya City Council's jurisdiction, and as such, are part of the Petaling Jaya city proper. These stations are both served by the 2 Tanjung Malim-Port Klang Line, as well as the ETS KTM ETS, an inter-city rail service providing services to Padang Besar, Butterworth, Ipoh and Gemas. The 12 MRT Putrajaya Line also calls at Sungai Buloh station.

=== Expressways ===
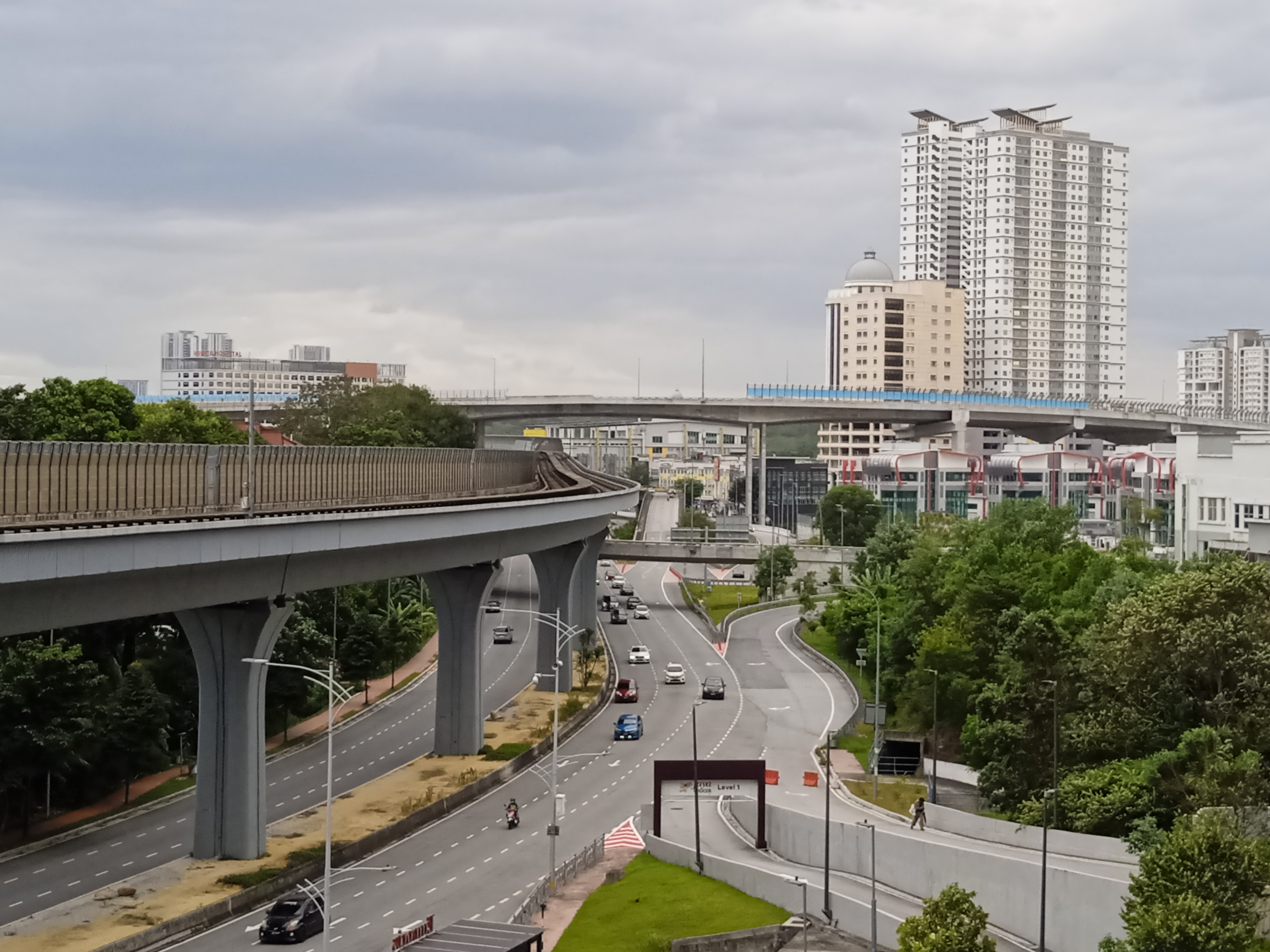
Persiaran Surian, the main road in Petaling Jaya

Petaling Jaya has three access points to the national highway system: North–South Expressway Northern Route via Kota Damansara, Damansara, and Subang. Internally, highways such as the Damansara–Puchong Expressway, Sprint Expressway and the FT 2 Federal Highway exist and also known for traffic jams.

Petaling Jaya is also served by the Sultan Abdul Aziz Shah Airport which is located immediately to the west of Petaling Jaya.

== Education ==
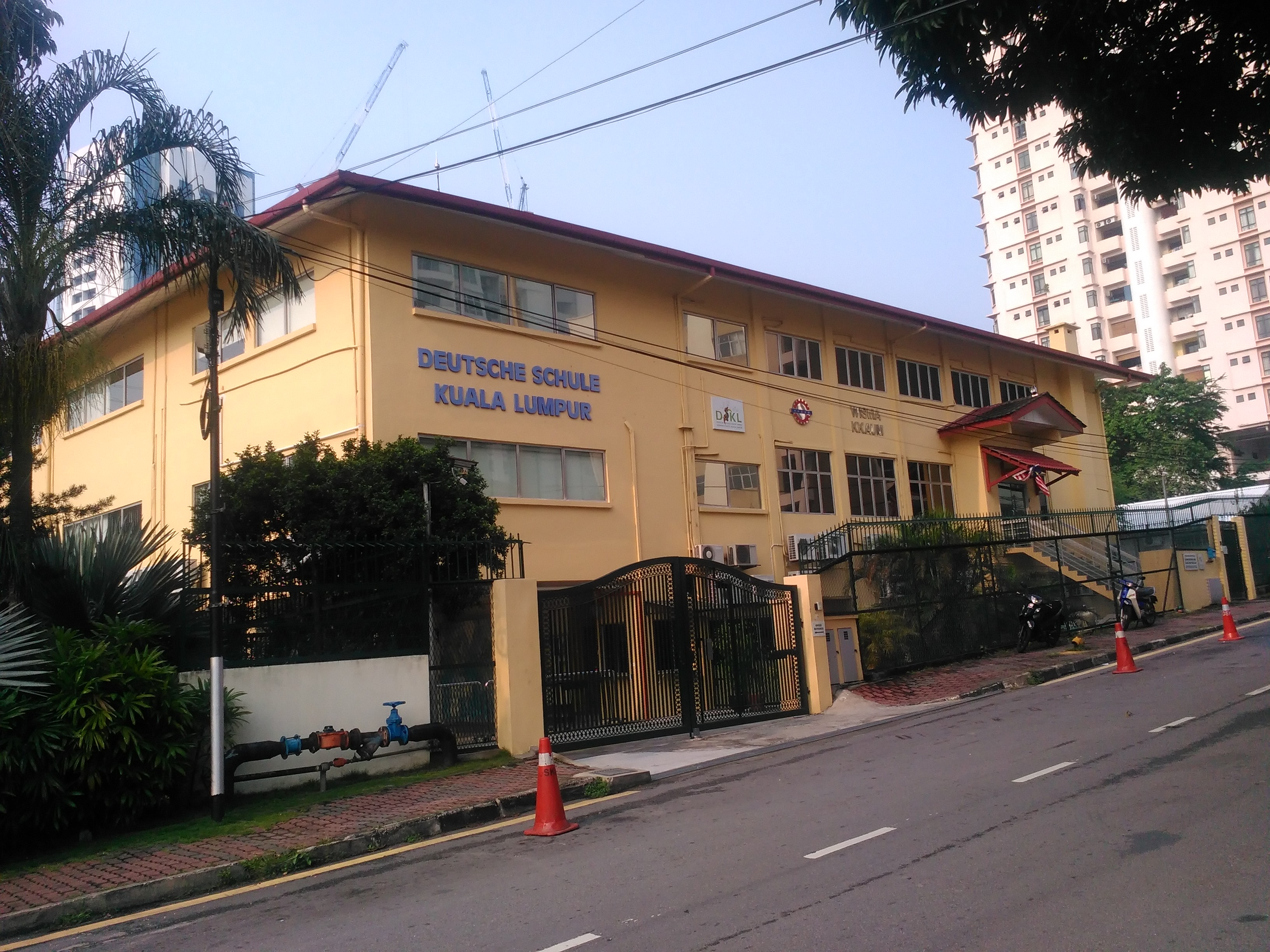
German School Kuala Lumpur

There are more than 25 colleges and universities in Petaling Jaya including International Islamic University Malaysia (IIUM/UIAM) centre for foundation studies campus in Section 17, SAITO University College in PJ New Town, MARA University of Technology (UiTM) campus branch on Jalan Othman in Section 1, Tun Abdul Razak University (UNITAR) main campus in SS6 Kelana Jaya, Stamford College on Jalan Timur and Jalan 223 (moved out, no longer there), Food Institute of Malaysia (FIM) in SS6 Kelana Jaya, Lincoln University College, Malaysia University of Science & Technology (MUST) main campus in SS7, Kolej Bandar Utama (KBU) in Bandar Utama, IACT College at Damansara Utama, Brickfields Asia College at Section 14, SEGi University at Kota Damansara, and International University College Of Technology Twintech a private college at Bandar Sri Damansara. TCA College (Malaysia) (TCAM) is an interdenominational Charismatic Bible College, and City University Malaysia main campus in Section 51a near LRT Asia Jaya.

The UiTM facility in Section 1 was established as the Dewan Latehan RIDA in November 1956. It was later renamed Dewan Latihan MARA. This was a training centre under the auspices of the Rural and Industrial Development Authority (RIDA) and spearheaded by Dato' Onn Jaafar, the founder and former president of the United Malays National Organisation (UMNO).

There are 58 primary and 28 secondary schools in Petaling Jaya under the purview of Malaysian Ministry of Education including

- SK Kampung Tunku
- SK Kelana Jaya
- SK Sri Damai
- SMK Taman SEA
- SMK Damansara Utama
- SMK (L) Bukit Bintang
- SMK (P) Assunta
- SMK (P) Sri Aman
- SMJK (C) Katholik
- SMK (L) La Salle
- SMK Damansara Jaya
- SMK Bandar Utama Damansara 3
- SMK Taman Medan
- SMK (P) Taman Petaling
- SMK Kelana Jaya.

The oldest schools in Petaling Jaya are likely the Road 10 Primary School in Old Town, followed by Assunta in 1955 by the Franciscan Missionaries of Mary and La Salle in 1959 by the De La Salle Brothers. The foundation stone of the Road 10 school was placed by Sultan Hisamuddin Alam Shah in 1952.

The German School Kuala Lumpur, a German international school, is in Petaling Jaya.

Malaysia's first private nursing college is at Assunta Hospital in Petaling Jaya. The Tun Tan Cheng Lock College of Nursing was founded in 1961.

== Sports ==
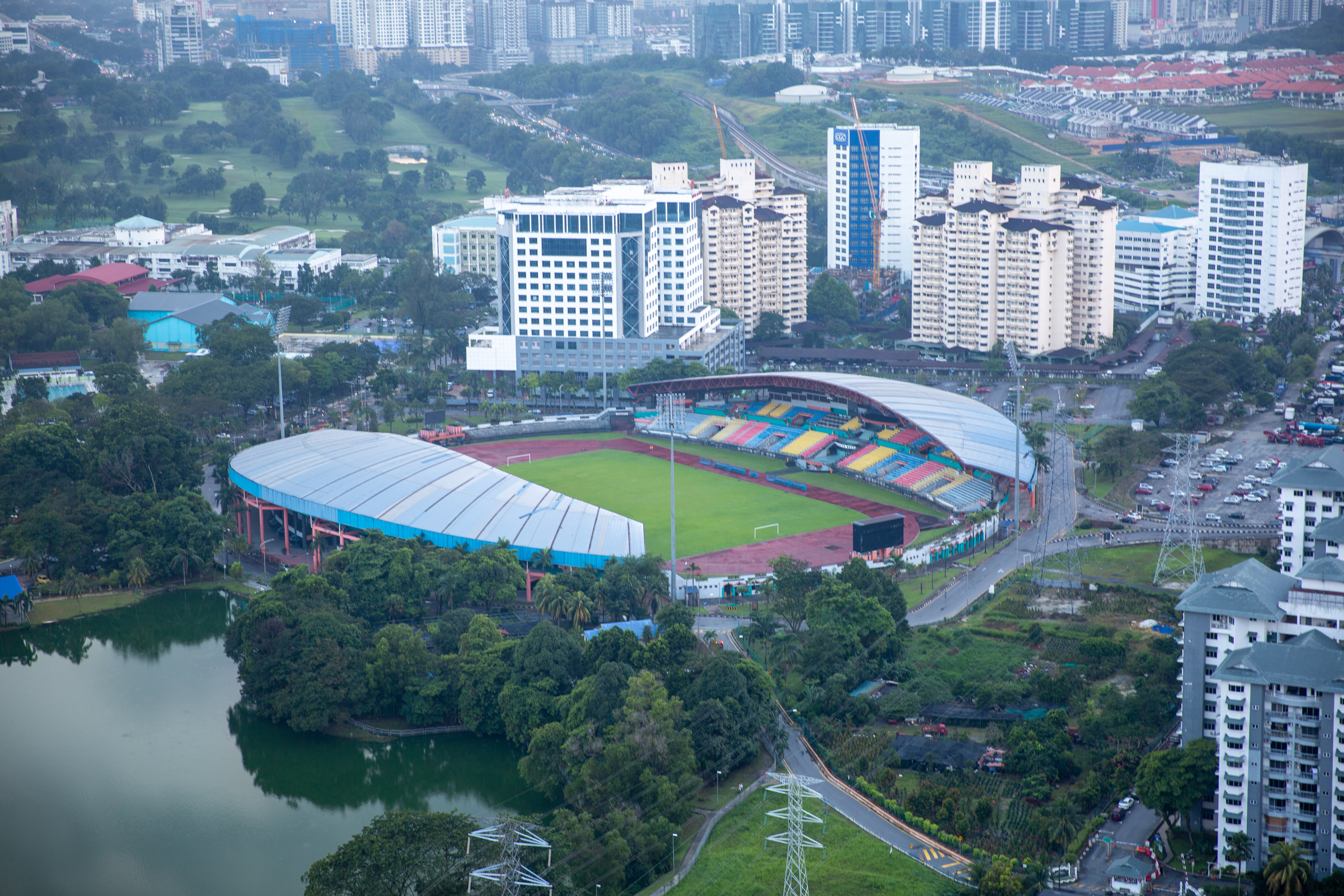
Petaling Jaya Stadium

Petaling Jaya has a fully equipped, multi-purpose stadium known as Petaling Jaya Stadium. Petaling Jaya Stadium is the home of Petaling Jaya City F.C. and Petaling Jaya Rangers, and has a capacity of 25,000. Selangor F.C. is currently using the stadium for their home games while their official home stadium, Shah Alam Stadium, was supposed to undergo a major transformation but there are concerns that the stadium could be demolished to make way for an entirely new state-of-the-art facility.

The Headquarter of Football Association of Malaysia (FAM) is also located in Petaling Jaya.

== Media ==
Petaling Jaya is the headquarters for newspaper and online news companies such as: Free Malaysia Today, Malay Mail, Malaysiakini, Nanyang Siang Pau, Sin Chew Daily, Star Media Group (Menara Star), The Edge Media Group (Menara KLK), The Malaysian Reserve and The Sun Daily and the radio and television division of Media Prima Berhad (Sri Pentas), all of them are located near Kuala Lumpur.

== Places of worship ==
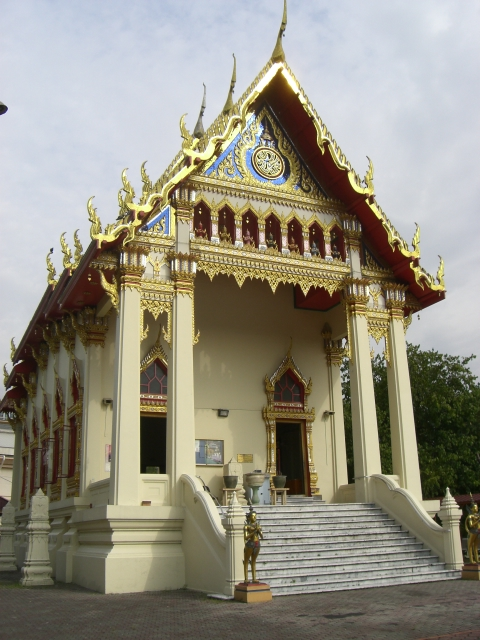
Wat Chetawan Thai Buddhist temple.

Mosques are located at Jalan Templer, Section 17, Section 14, Section SS1, and Damansara Utama. Masjid Kelana Jaya Putera, which was built in the late-2000s, is located in Kelana Jaya. Masjid Jamek Sultan Abdul Aziz Shah at Jalan Templer is likely the oldest mosque in Petaling Jaya. This mosque was opened by the Sultan of Selangor on 23 October 1964. Later in 2008, the mosque was modernised and rebuilt.

The Roman Catholic Christian community attend mass at churches such as at St Francis Xavier's, located on Jalan Gasing, this church was established in 1961. Two other Catholic churches are the Church of the Assumption on Jalan Templer as well as St. Ignatius in Taman Mayang. The Assumption church is the oldest, it dates from 1959. The Trinity Methodist church dates from 2 August 1959 and is at Jalan 5/37. An Anglican as well as a Lutheran church is located at Jalan Utara. Glad Tidings Assembly of God church is at Jalan Bersatu 13/4. Several shophouse-based churches exist across Petaling Jaya. In 1997, the former Ruby Cinema in SEA Park temporarily became the Damansara Utama Methodist Church. DUMC later relocated to its permanent building located in Section 13. Harvest Community Church (an Assembly of God church) is located at Jalan Sungai Jernih. Small "shoplot" churches can be found all around the city; some of these have transformed into larger churches, such as the Grace Assembly (an Assembly of God church). These attract a larger following and can be found in many places around the city. There is also Acts Church's service plants located inside the Jaya One shopping mall. Kingdomcity church is located in the Evolve Concept Mall.

The Thai Buddhist Temple, Wat Chetawan along Jalan Gasing was built in 1957 and officiated by the late King Bhumibol Adulyadej, King of Thailand. Chempaka Buddhist Lodge (千百家佛教居士林) was established in 1985, it is managed by the lay Buddhist community and located at Taman SEA. Chinese Buddhist temples such as Poh Lum Fatt Yuen (寶林法苑) along Jalan Gasing and Kwan Inn Teng Temple (觀音亭) are also catered for the local Chinese Buddhist community. Hung Shing Temple (洪聖宫廟) and Yuen Leong Sing Fatt Temple (阮梁聖佛宮) fulfill the needs of the Taoist community. Other Chinese temples such as the Yuan Lin Xiao Zhot Buddhist Temple (园林小筑) and Sau Seng Lum Buddhist Temple (修成林) can also be found in PJ Old Town and in Section 11.

The Sri Sithi Vinayagar Temple at Section 4 along Jalan Selangor serves as the main religious facility for Petaling Jaya's Hindu community. The main deity worshiped here is Pillaiyar (a common Tamil name for Ganesha). There is a Mariamman Temple in Jalan 17/47, and the Geeta Ashram is a north-Indian style Hindu Temple dedicated to Krishna. The Geeta Ashram can be found in Lorong Utara B in Section 52.

There is a Sikh Gurdwara located in Lorong Utara B, beside the Tun Hussein Onn Eye Hospital and the Geeta Ashram.

== Notable people ==
- Riad Asmat, former CEO of Caterham F1 Team in 2010–2014 was born on 17 November 1971
- Bernard Chandran, Malaysian fashion designer
- Raymond Koh, Christian pastor abducted by the Malaysian Special Branch on 13 February 2017 due to suspicions of converting Sunni Muslims to Christianity.
- Yeoh Li Tian, Malaysian first chess Grandmaster
- Sharlinie Mohd Nashar, child who mysteriously disappeared in 2008 and has still not been found

== Sister cities ==
Petaling Jaya currently has four sister cities:

- Guangzhou, China.
- Bandung, Indonesia.
- Miyoshi, Japan.
- Asan, South Korea.
