= IACT =

IACT may refer to:

- IACT College, a college in Malaysia
- Illinois Alliance for Clean Transportation, a clean-fuel advocacy alliance
- Imaging atmospheric Cherenkov telescope, a method to detect very-high-energy gamma ray photons
