= Asia Jaya LRT station =

Railway station in Petaling Jaya, Malaysia

KJ21 Asia Jaya
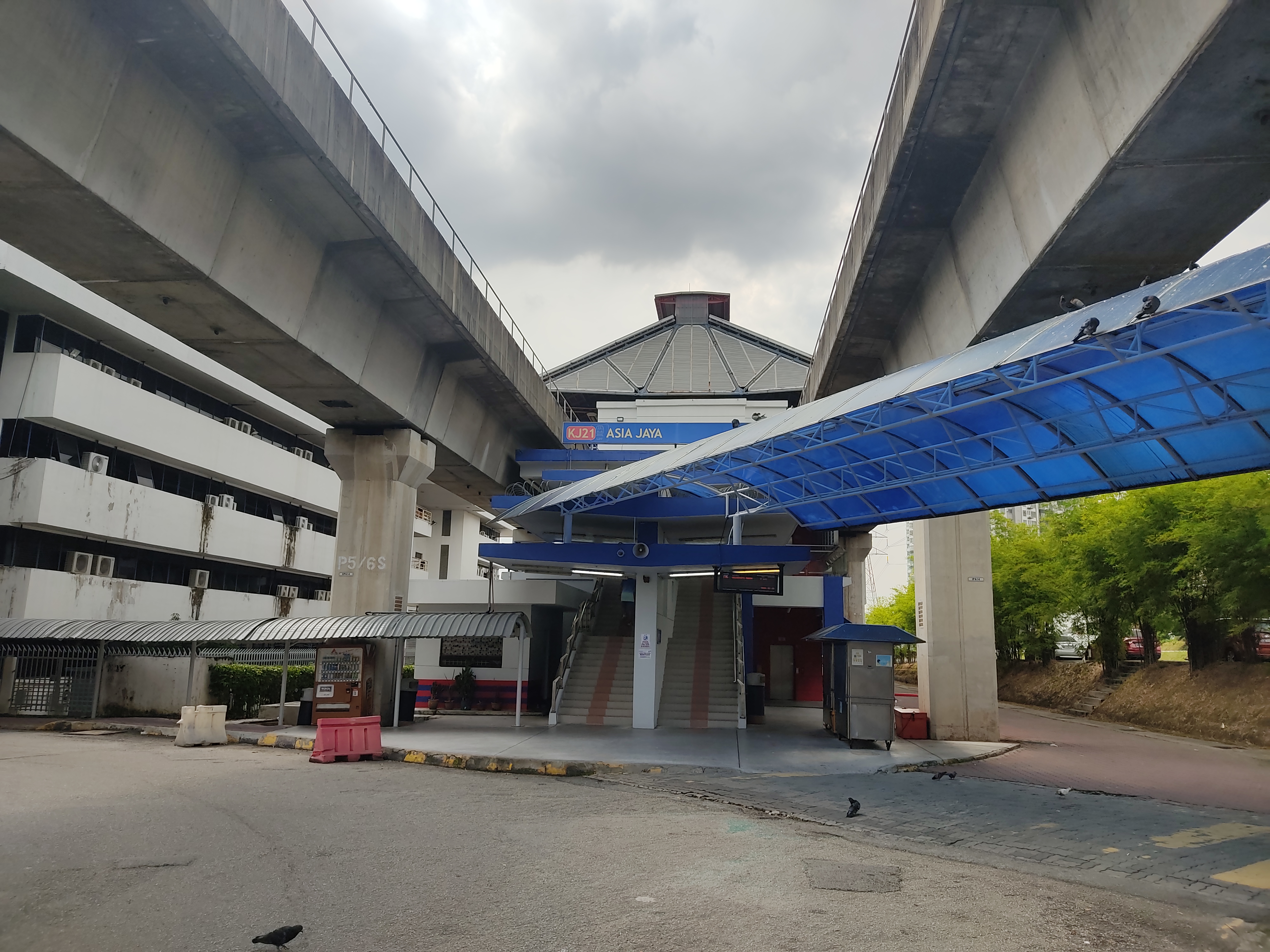
- View of the exterior of the station seen from Jalan Utara.

General information
- Other names: Malay: اسيا جاي (Jawi); Chinese: 亚洲再也; Tamil: ஆசியா ஜெயா
- Location: Off Jalan Utara and Jalan 51A/223, Section 51A, 46100 Petaling Jaya; Selangor; Malaysia
- Coordinates: 3°6′15″N 101°38′16″E
- System: Rapid KL
- Owner: Prasarana Malaysia
- Operator: Rapid Rail
- Line: 5 Kelana Jaya Line
- Platforms: 1 island platform
- Tracks: 2

Construction
- Structure type: Elevated
- Parking: Available. Free parking bays.
- Accessible: Available

Other information
- Station code: KJ21

History
- Opened: 1 September 1998; 27 years ago

Services
Preceding station		Following station
Taman Jaya towards Gombak	Kelana Jaya Line	Taman Paramount towards Putra Heights
Location

Asia Jaya LRT station is an elevated light rapid transit (LRT) station in Petaling Jaya, Selangor, Malaysia, forming part of the LRT Kelana Jaya Line. The station was opened on 1 September 1998, as part of the line's first segment encompassing 10 elevated stations between Kelana Jaya and Pasar Seni stations (not including the KL Sentral which opened later), and the line's maintenance depot in Lembah Subang.

== Location ==
Asia Jaya station is located on the southern edge of Petaling Jaya's Section 14, a residential area, off the main thoroughfare of Jalan Utara (North Road) to the east and Jalan 51A/223 (51A/223 Road) to the south, positioning itself between several civic, industrial, commercial and residential districts. Among them, Section 8 (residential area), Section 51A (industrial area) and Section 52 ("New" Petaling Jaya town and public and commercial buildings) to the south and east, and Section 14 to the north. Tenaga Nasional's Petaling Jaya branch is located directly south of the station.

The station is also situated some 300 metres (1/5 mi) from the nearest access point onto the Federal Highway via Jalan Utara to the south. The neighbouring Taman Jaya is roughly located in the same location 900 metres (3/5 mi) east, although Taman Jaya station was constructed on the opposing south side of the Federal Highway and is more directly connected to Section 52.

The station is currently named after the former Asia Jaya shopping complex, which was converted into the Armada Hotel later during the 1990s, on the opposite side of Jalan Utara.

== Bus services ==
In comparison to Taman Jaya, Asia Jaya station is linked to three bus stops that significantly increase the station's reach around Petaling Jaya and neighbouring towns and cities more than Taman Jaya. Asia Jaya station's own bus stop primarily links Sections 12, 13, 14, 16, 17 and 19 of Petaling Jaya to the station. Within a walking distance, two more bus stops at both sides of the Federal Highway allow users to board buses that shuttle between Kuala Lumpur, Klang, Shah Alam, Subang Jaya and the rest of Petaling Jaya.

Aeroline, an executive bus service to Singapore, used to operate from the front entrance of Menara Axis (Axis Tower) opposite the Asia Jaya station before shifting operations to the Bandar Utama bus hub, located outside 1 Utama, in December 2006.

== Gallery ==
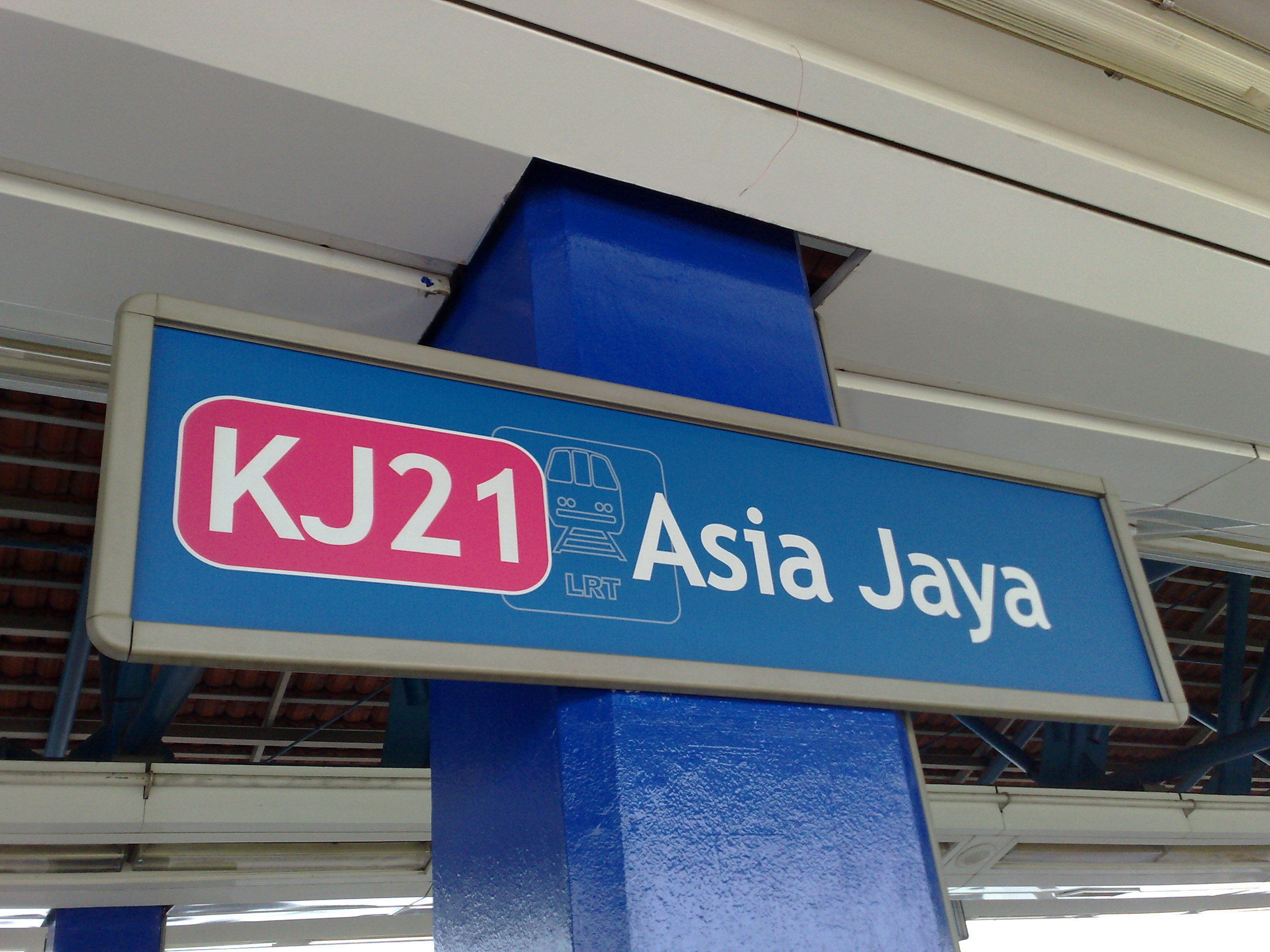
Asia Jaya platform board

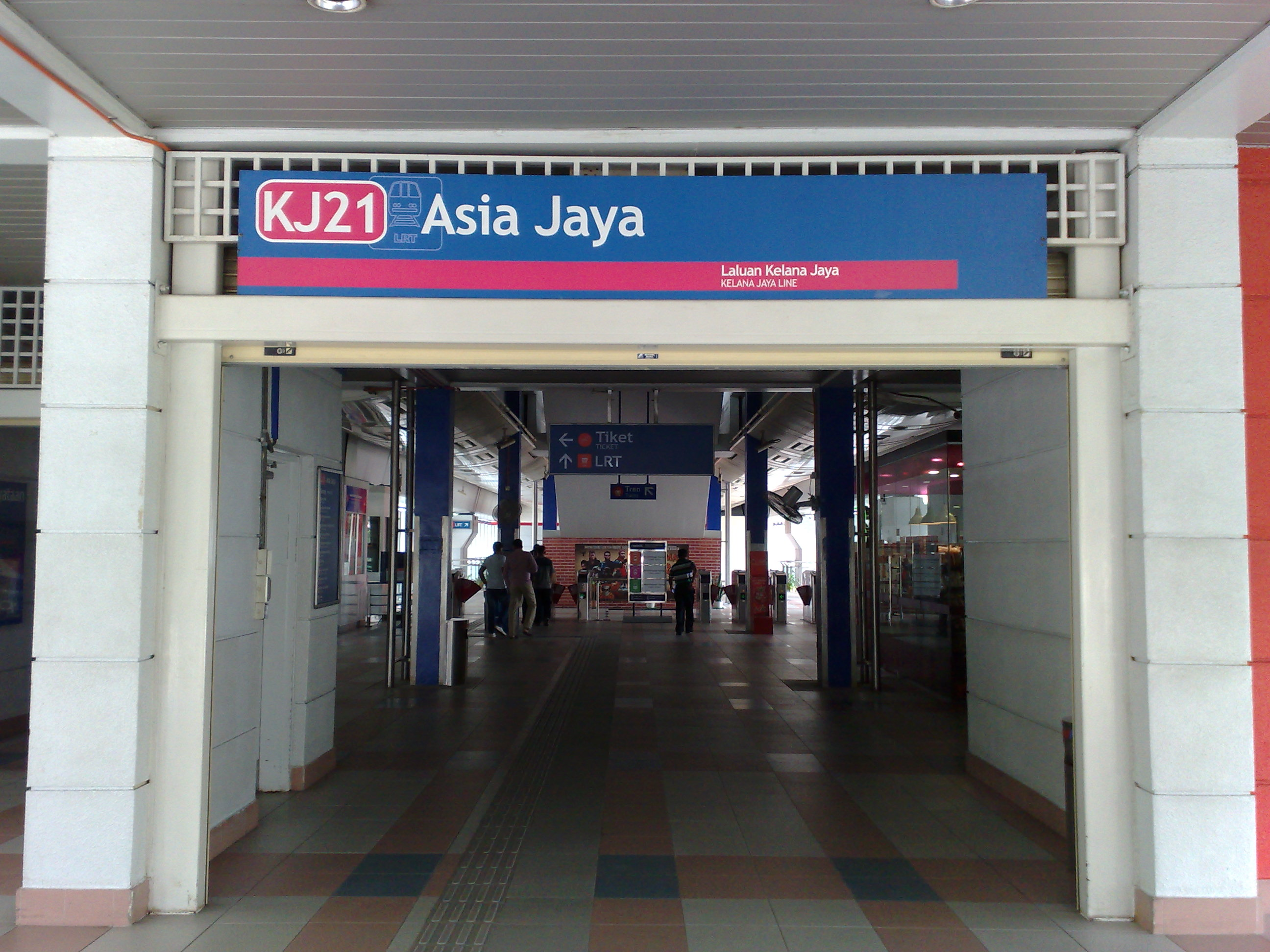
Station entrance

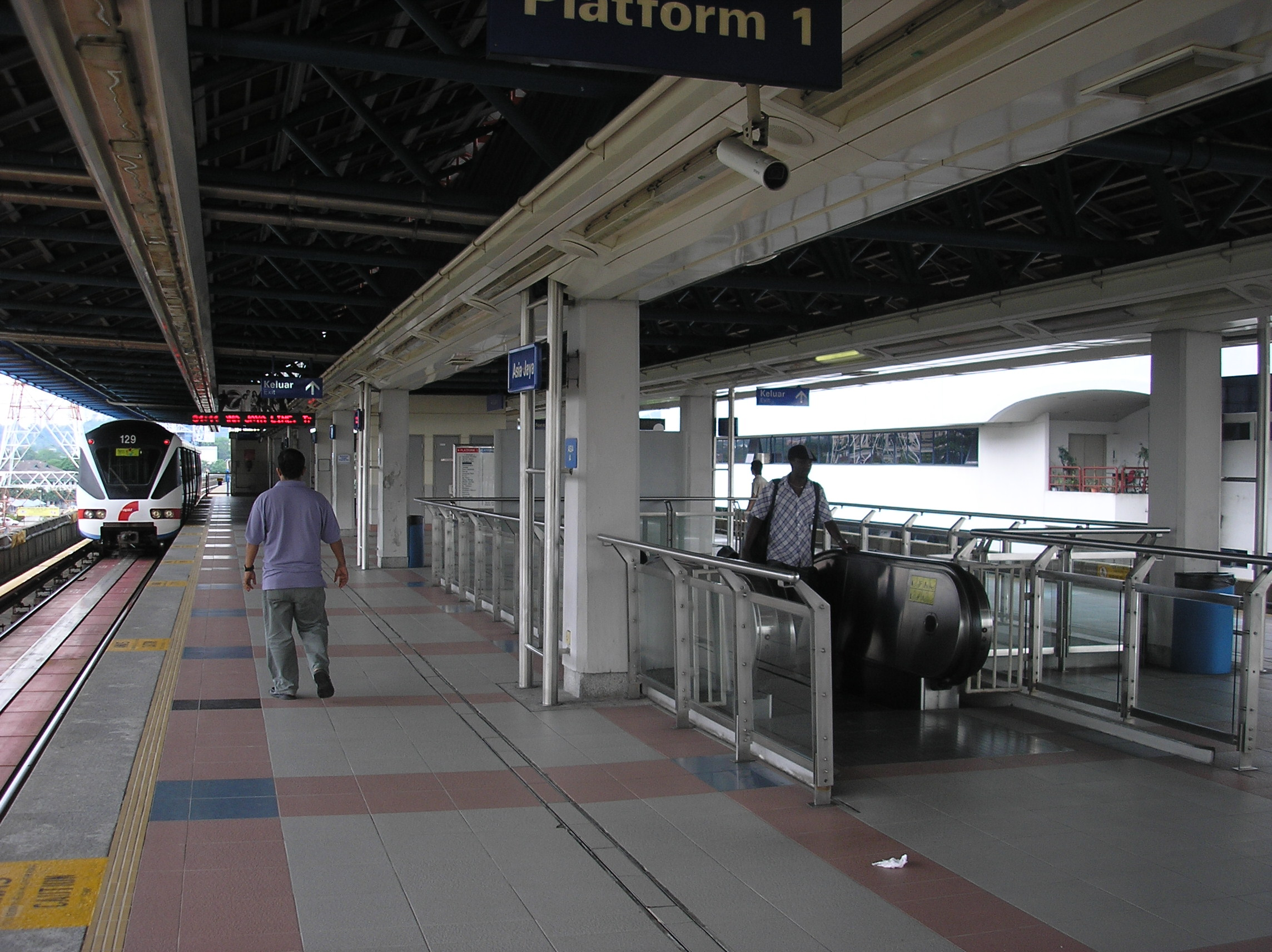
Station's platform level, as seen towards the east. The station is one of thirteen Kelana Jaya Line stations that features an island platform.

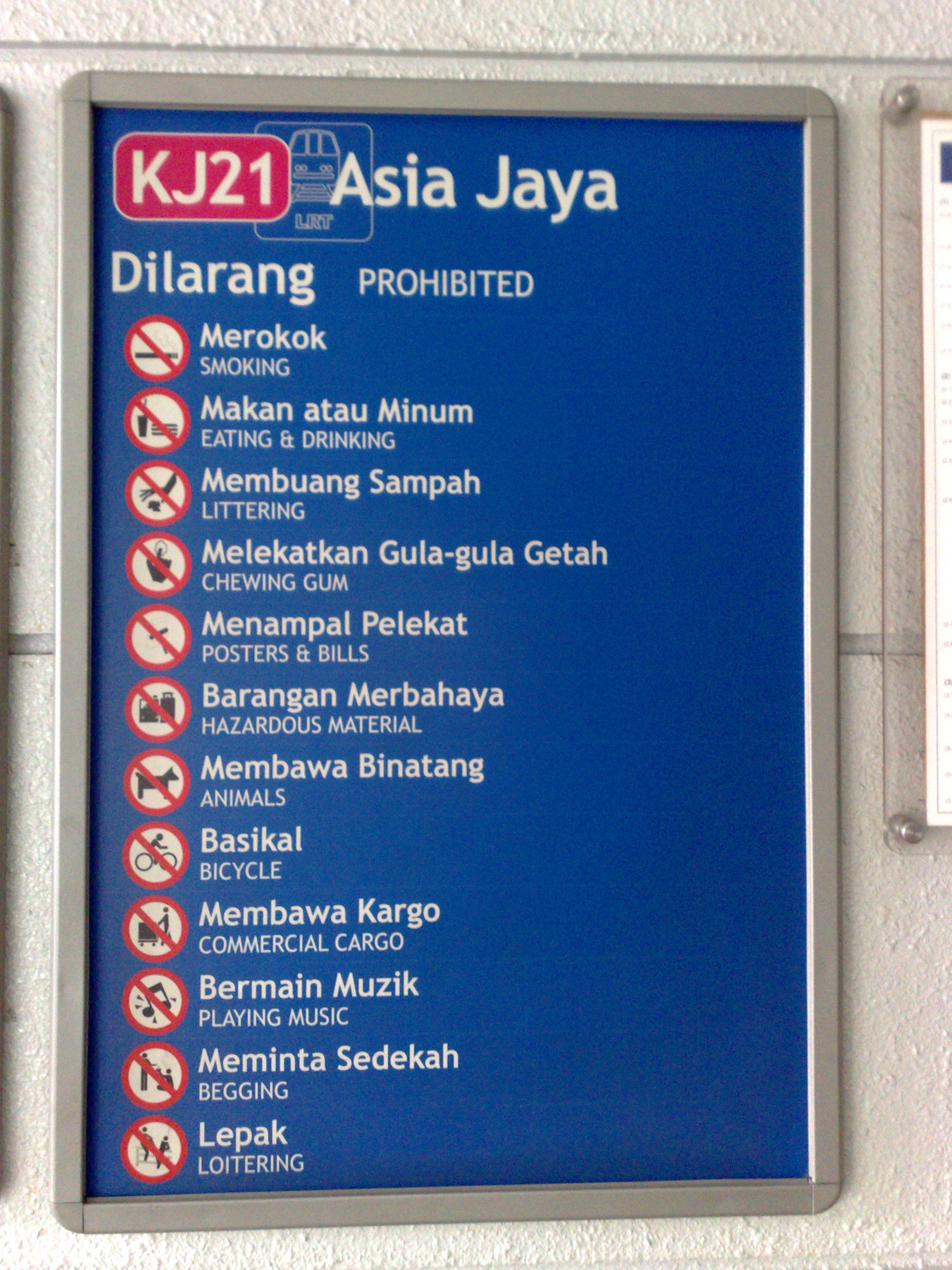
Station notice board

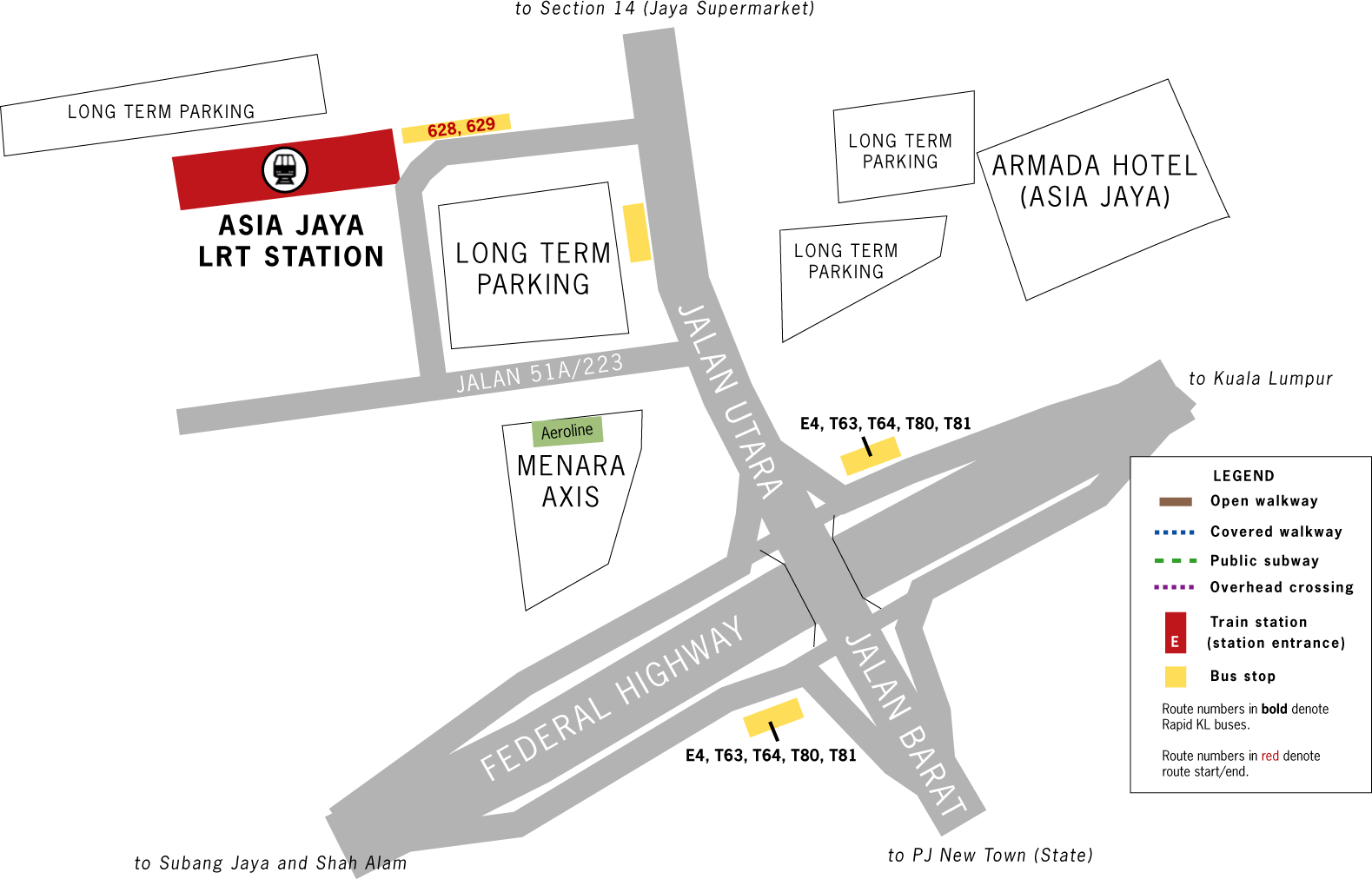
A map depicting Asia Jaya station's immediate surroundings, and illustrates the location of the three bus stops accessible from the station.

== See also ==
- Rail transport in Malaysia
