= Petaling Jaya Museum =

Museum in Petaling, Selangor, Malaysia

- Muzium Petaling Jaya
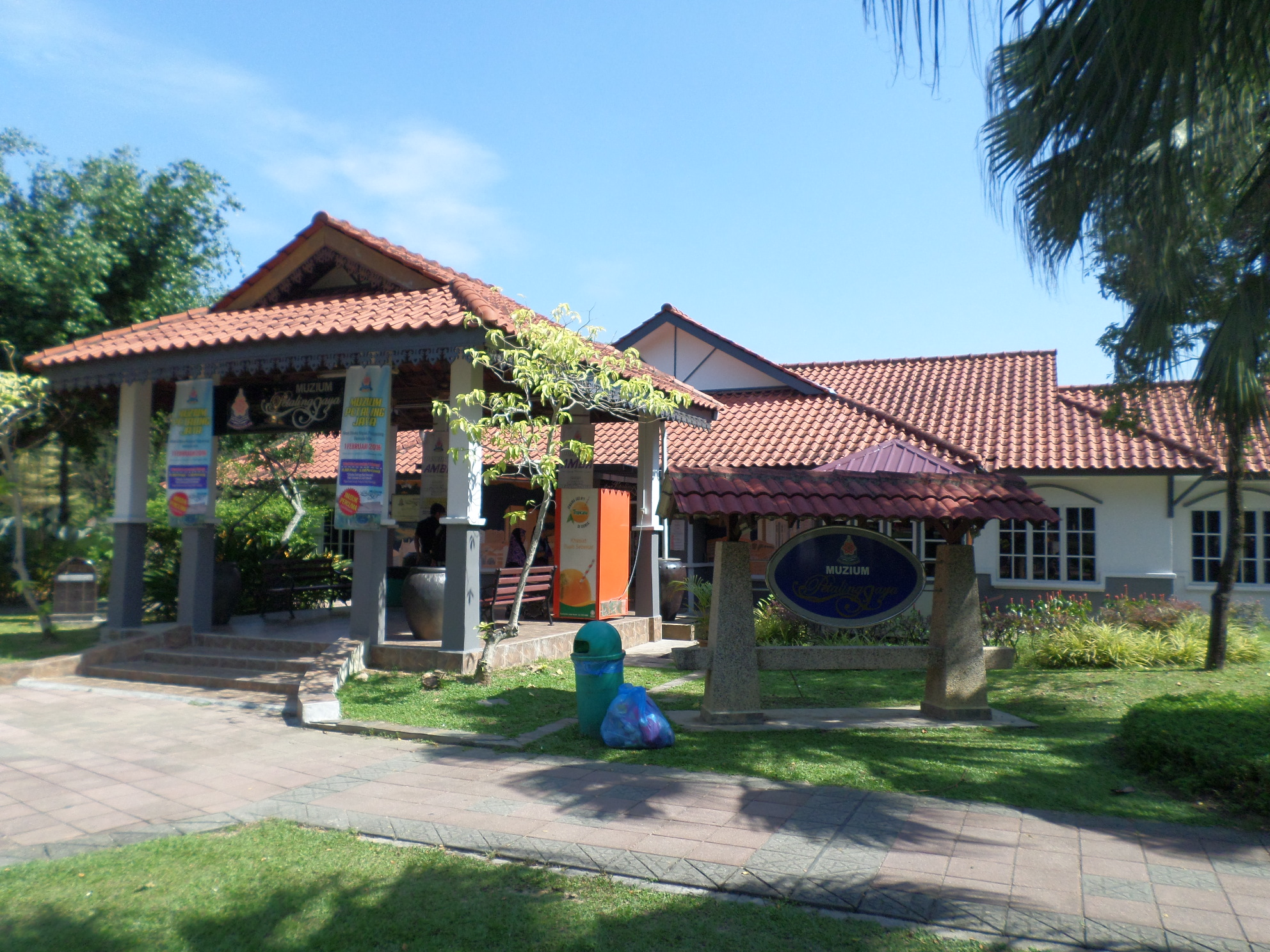
- Established: November 2007
- Location: Petaling Jaya, Petaling, Selangor, Malaysia
- Coordinates: 3°6′16.9″N 101°39′3.1″E
- Type: museum
- Website: Official website (in Malay)

The Petaling Jaya Museum (Malay: Muzium Petaling Jaya) is a museum in Petaling Jaya, Petaling District, Selangor, Malaysia. It showcases the history and the development of Petaling Jaya.

== History ==
The museum building was originally established in 1980 as children reading house. In 1992, the reading house ceased to function due to its location and the building was taken over by the environment development department. It was then transformed into a nature education center. In April 2007, the building was taken over by the museum department and was turned into a museum. Construction and renovation work was completed in October 2007 and the museum was officially opened on 12 November 2007. It was later closed for renovation and was reopened again in April 2016.

== Exhibitions ==
The museum showcases the historical development of Petaling Jaya housed in three sections, which are the origin of Petaling Jaya, administration of Petaling Jaya and the expansion of Petaling Jaya.

== Opening time ==
The museum opens everyday except Fridays and public holidays from 9.00 a.m. to 5.00 p.m. free of charge.

== Transportation ==
The museum is accessible within walking distance east of Taman Jaya LRT Station.

== See also ==
- List of museums in Malaysia
