= German School Kuala Lumpur =

- Deutsche Schule Kuala Lumpur; Sekolah Jerman Kuala Lumpur
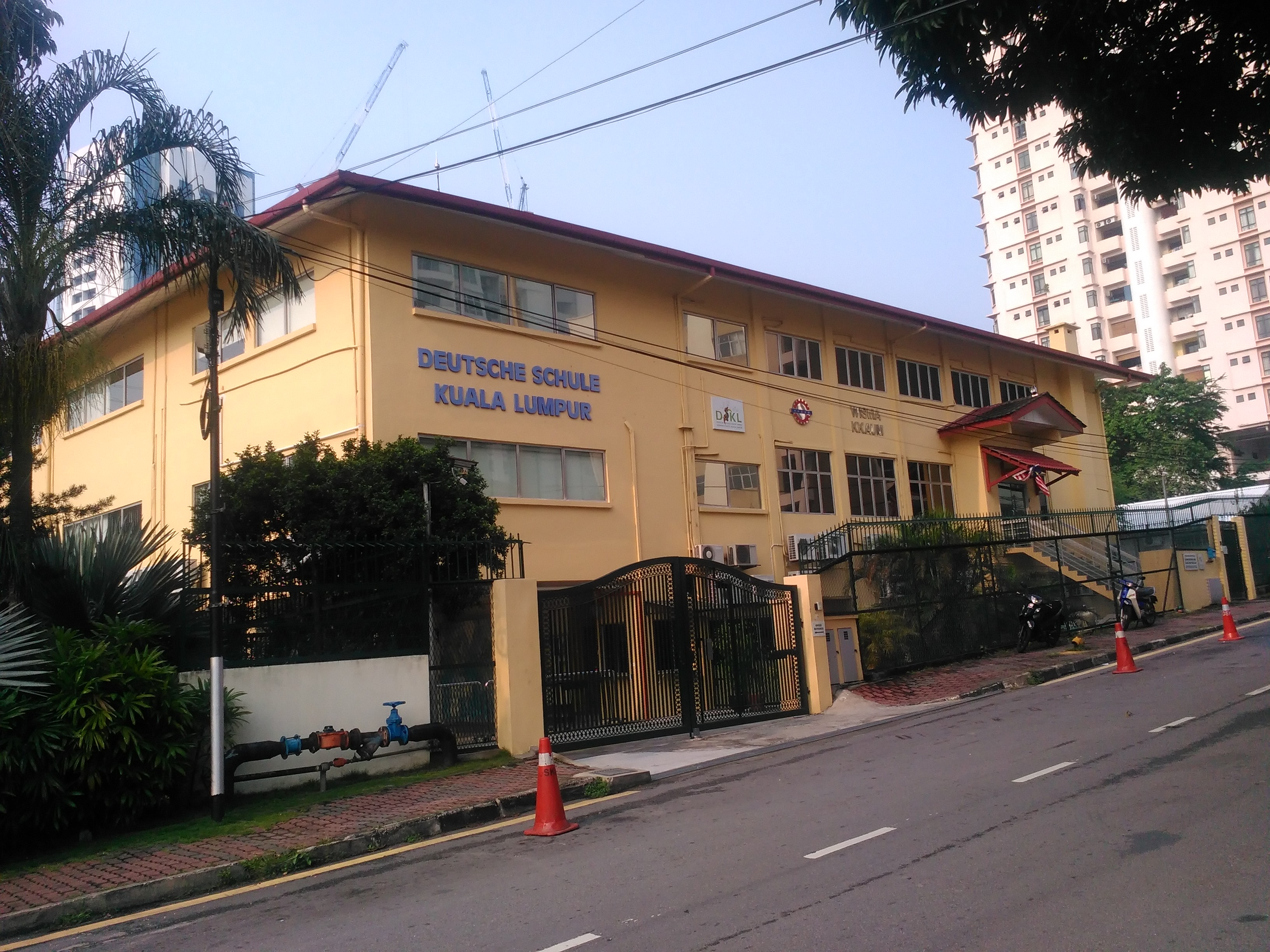

Location
- Lot 5, Lorong Utara B 46200 Petaling Jaya; 3.105827°N 101.64061500000003°E

Information
- Type: Private, international school
- Website: dskl.edu.my

The German School Kuala Lumpur (German: Deutsche Schule Kuala Lumpur, DSKL; Malay: Sekolah Jerman Kuala Lumpur) is a private school in Malaysia that is located on Lorong Utara B in Petaling Jaya, Selangor, near the Tun Hussein Onn Eye Hospital. The syllabus at this school is based on the German Education Curriculum.

The school is a non-profit private institution run by the Society Persatuan Sekolah Jerman Malaysia (Deutscher Schulverein Malaysia). It provides education for students from Kindergarten including Preschool (1 year) to Primary School (4 years) and thereafter Secondary School (8 years) which leads to the German University Entrance Qualification "DIA" (Deutsches Internationales Abitur).

Near the school is a supervised dormitory for visiting students from Germany or for children whose families do not reside in the greater Kuala Lumpur area.

== See also ==
- List of schools in Selangor
- Central Agency for German Schools Abroad
