= Taman Jaya LRT station =

Railway station in Petaling Jaya, Malaysia

KJ20 Taman Jaya
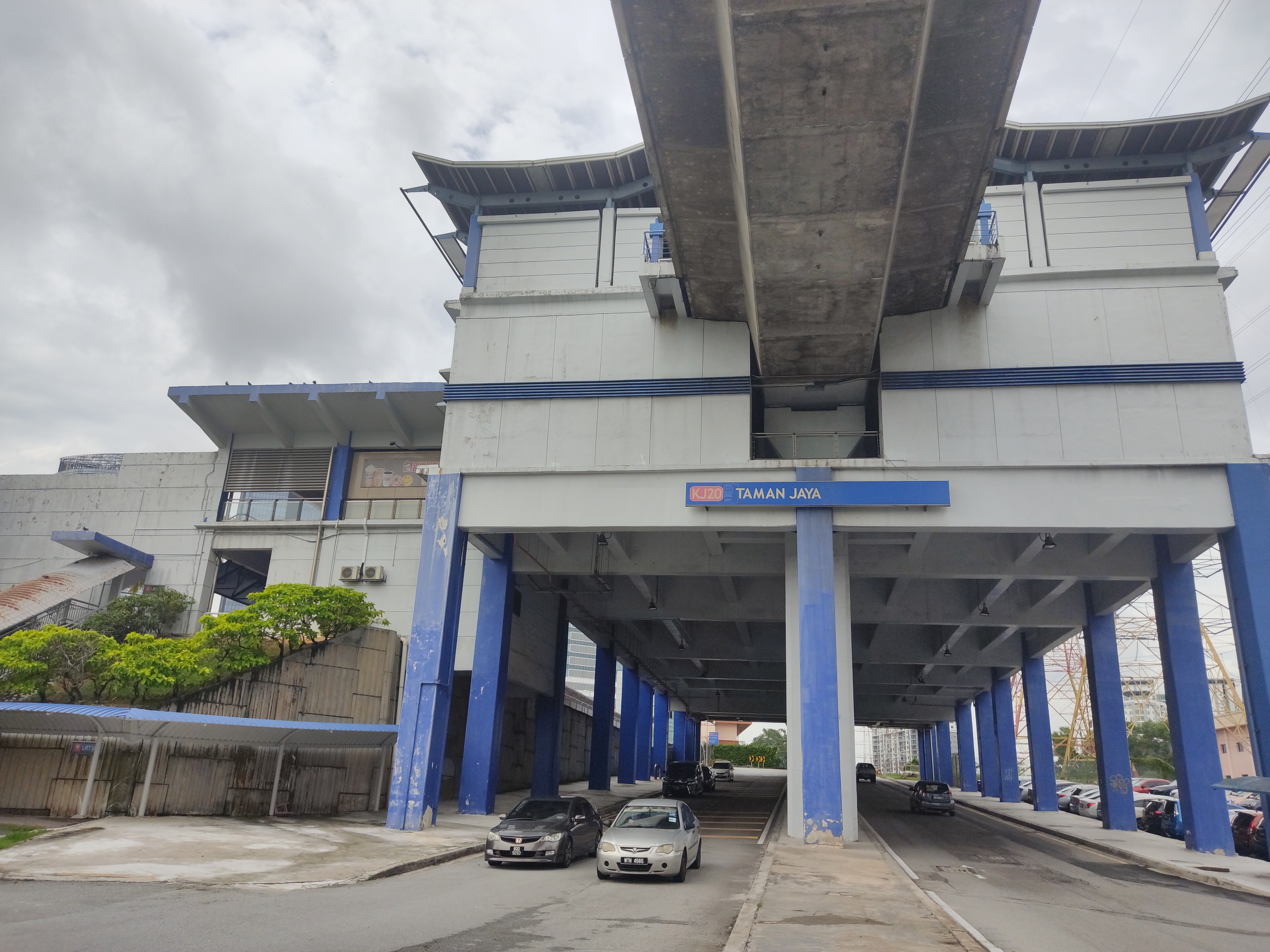
- View of the exterior of the station from Persiaran Barat.

General information
- Other names: Malay: تامن جاي (Jawi); Chinese: 再也花园; Tamil: தாமான் ஜெயா
- Location: Persiaran Barat, Section 52, 46200 Petaling Jaya; Selangor; Malaysia
- Coordinates: 3°6′14″N 101°38′42″E
- System: Rapid KL
- Owner: Prasarana Malaysia
- Operator: Rapid Rail
- Line: 5 Kelana Jaya Line
- Platforms: 2 side platforms
- Tracks: 2

Construction
- Structure type: Elevated
- Parking: Available. Free parking bays.
- Accessible: Available

Other information
- Station code: KJ20

History
- Opened: 1 September 1998; 27 years ago

Services
Preceding station		Following station
Universiti towards Gombak	Kelana Jaya Line	Asia Jaya towards Putra Heights
Location

The Taman Jaya LRT station is an elevated light rapid transit (LRT) station in Petaling Jaya, Selangor, Malaysia, forming part of the LRT Kelana Jaya Line. The station was opened on 1 September 1998, as part of the line's first segment encompassing 10 elevated stations between Kelana Jaya and Pasar Seni (not including the Kelana Jaya which opened later), and the line's maintenance depot in Lembah Subang.

== Location ==
Taman Jaya station is located directly north of Petaling Jaya's "newer" segment, Section 52, over the side road of Persiaran Barat (West Drive) close to the Persiaran Barat-Lorong Sultan (Sultan Lane) intersection, off the main thoroughfare of Jalan Timur (East Road). Due to its proximity to Section 52, the Taman Jaya station is situated close to several municipal buildings and Dataran Petaling Jaya (Petaling Jaya Square), a municipal field. In addition to Section 52, Taman Jaya station is within walking distance of neighbouring Sections 9, 10 and 11 of Petaling Jaya to the east. The station takes its name from Taman Jaya (Jaya Park) in Section 10, a lake garden and the first park founded in Petaling Jaya. Also in the vicinity of the station is the Amcorp Mall & Business Centre, the PJ Club adjoining Dataran Petaling Jaya, Syabas Club and the iconic A&W drive-in outlet.

The station is also situated some 440 metres from the nearest access point onto the Federal Highway via Jalan Timur to the north. The neighbouring Asia Jaya is roughly located in the same location 900 metres away to the west, although Asia Jaya station was constructed on the opposing north side of the Federal Highway, is further from Section 52, but has better access to bus services.

== Gallery ==
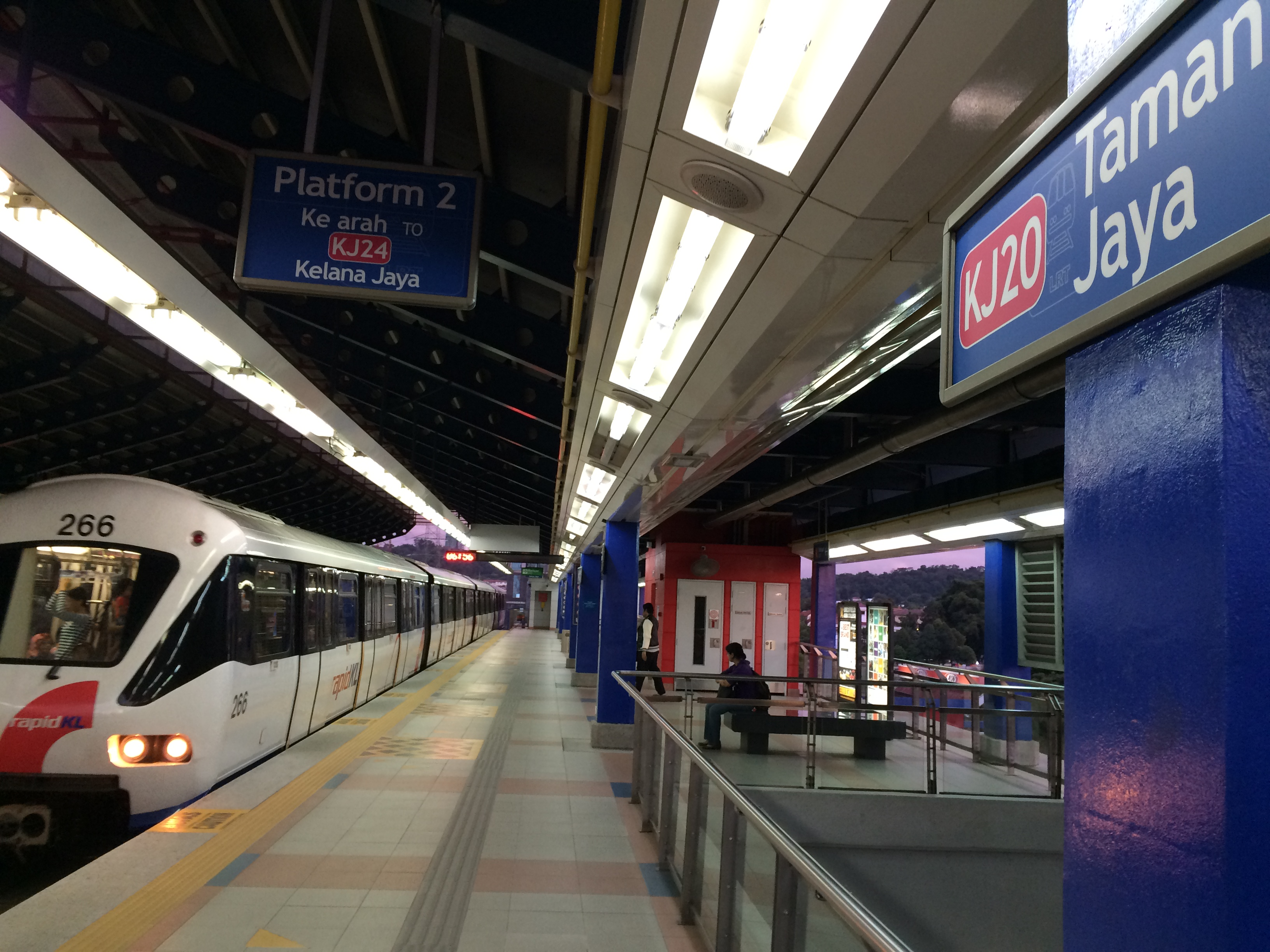
Train arriving at the station

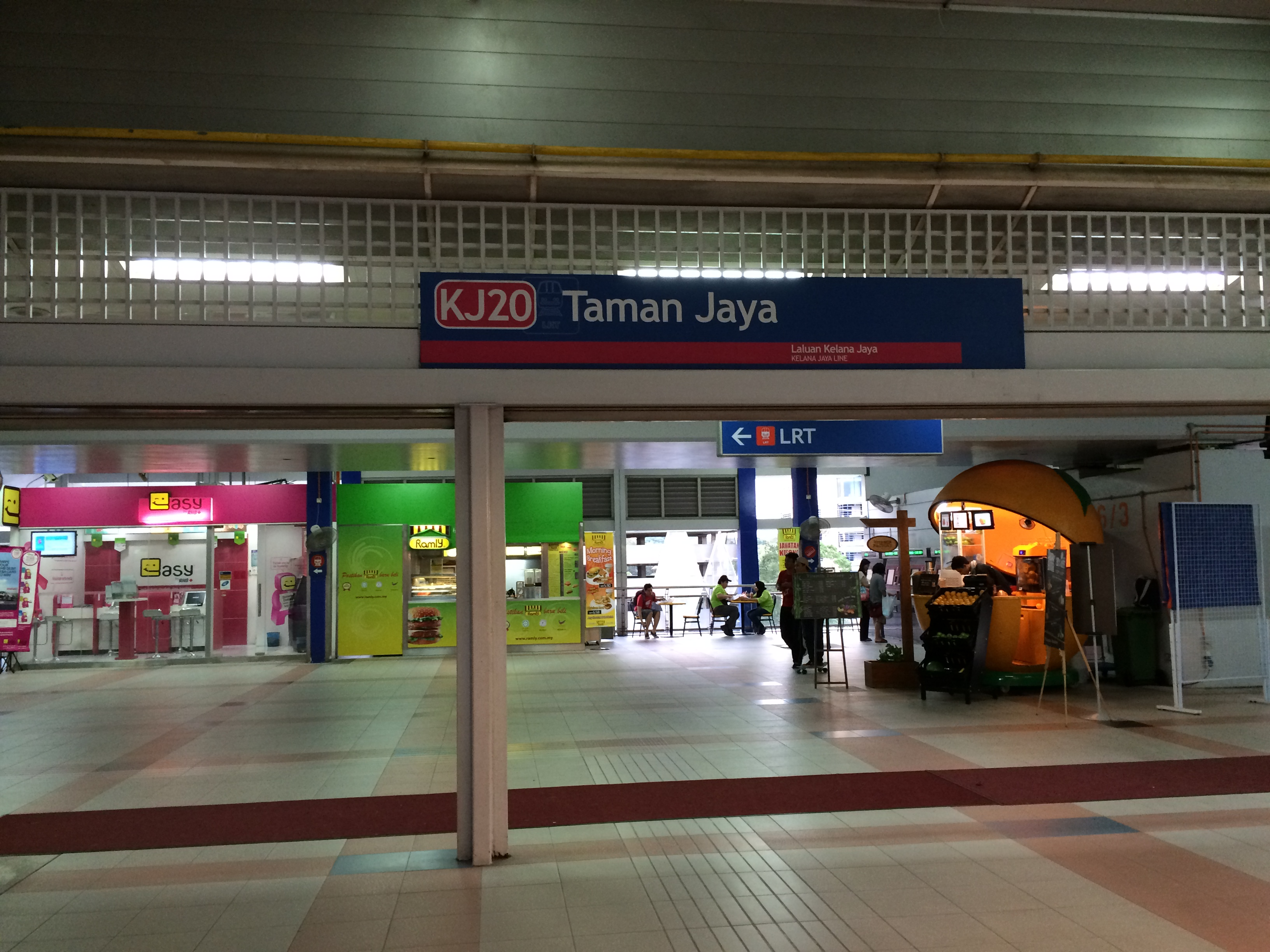
Taman Jaya station entrance

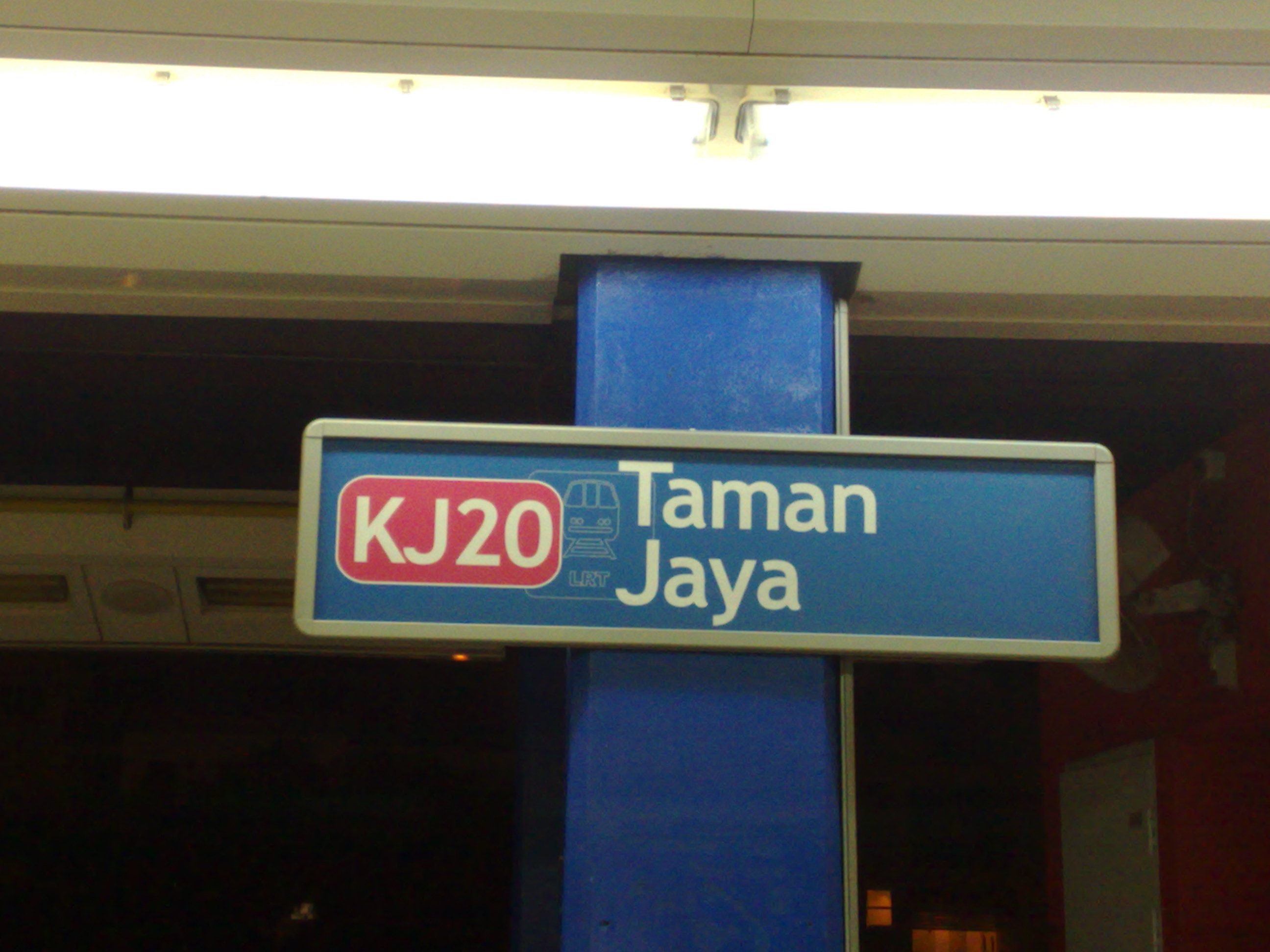
Platform board

== Around the station ==
- Taman Jaya
- Amcorp Mall
- Headquarters of Malaysian Meteorological Department
- Headquarters of Department of Chemistry, Malaysia
- Petaling Jaya Courthouse
- Petaling Jaya City Council Headquarters
- Petaling Jaya Museum
- Petaling Jaya Square
- Catholic High School, Petaling Jaya

== See also ==
- List of rail transit stations in Klang Valley
