= IACT College =

College in Petaling, Selangor, Malaysia

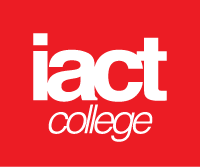
- Former name: Institute Advertising Communication Training
- Type: Education
- Established: 1970
- Location: Petaling Jaya, Selangor, Malaysia

IACT College, formerly known as Institute Advertising Communication Training, is now known as International Advertising, Communication and Technology College. IACT College offers programs in tertiary education from Certificate, Foundation, Diploma and Degree in the fields of Mass Communication, Marketing and Advertising, Broadcasting, Graphic Design, Event Communication, Professional Communication and Media Studies. In 1970, the two largest advertising associations in Malaysia came together to form what has become a college specializing in creative communication.

== History ==
IACT College was founded in the 1970s. The college was formerly located in Damansara Uptown, Petaling Jaya. In 2009, IACT College received a new management team and moved to the current campus in Jaya One.

== Project-based Learning ==
IACT College uses Project-based Learning (PBL) as its primary teaching method.
