= Acts Church =

- Location: Subang Jaya, Malaysia
- Country: Malaysia
- Denomination: Non-denominational
- Website: actschurch.org

History
- Founded: 2000
- Founder: Pr. Kenneth Chin

Acts Church is a non-denominational Church and contemporary worship music band founded by Pr. Kenneth Chin in the year 2000 in Subang Jaya, Malaysia. The church currently has over 3,000 attendees across 26 churches in 8 nations.

== History ==
This Church began in 2000, when Pastor Kenneth Chin started this church in Subang Jaya, Malaysia. Over the years, the church has grown to over 26 churches in 8 countries. Acts Church also has a few ministries under it. Notably, Acts Teens, Acts Kids, Acts Working Adults, Acts Campus and Acts Family.

== Music ==
In the year 2005, Acts Church released their first single titled God of Everything. Over the years, they have released multiple Albums and singles in English, Bahasa Melayu and Mandarin Chinese.

=== Discography ===
These albums and singles are independently recorded by Acts Church.

Albums

- Actsperiment 3.0: You Are Always Good (June 2010)
- Actsperiment 4.0: Fire Wall (November 2012)
- All to Jesus (June 2019)
- Hatiku Milikmu (2021)

Singles

- God of Everything (2005)
- I will Praise (2020)
- Guiding Light (2021)

== See also ==
- Christianity in Malaysia
- Pentecostalism
