= Old Town, Petaling Jaya =

- Inner Suburb
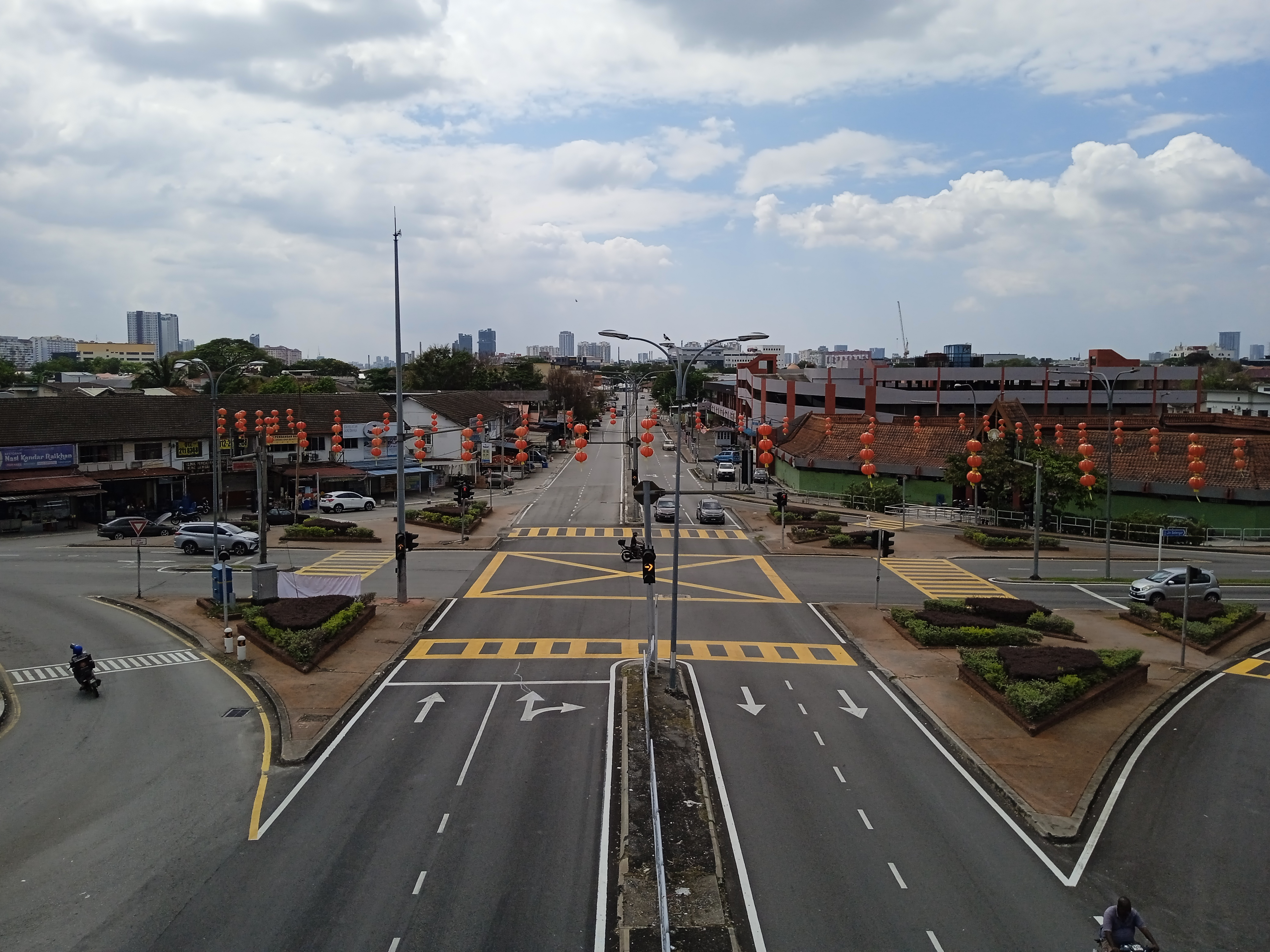
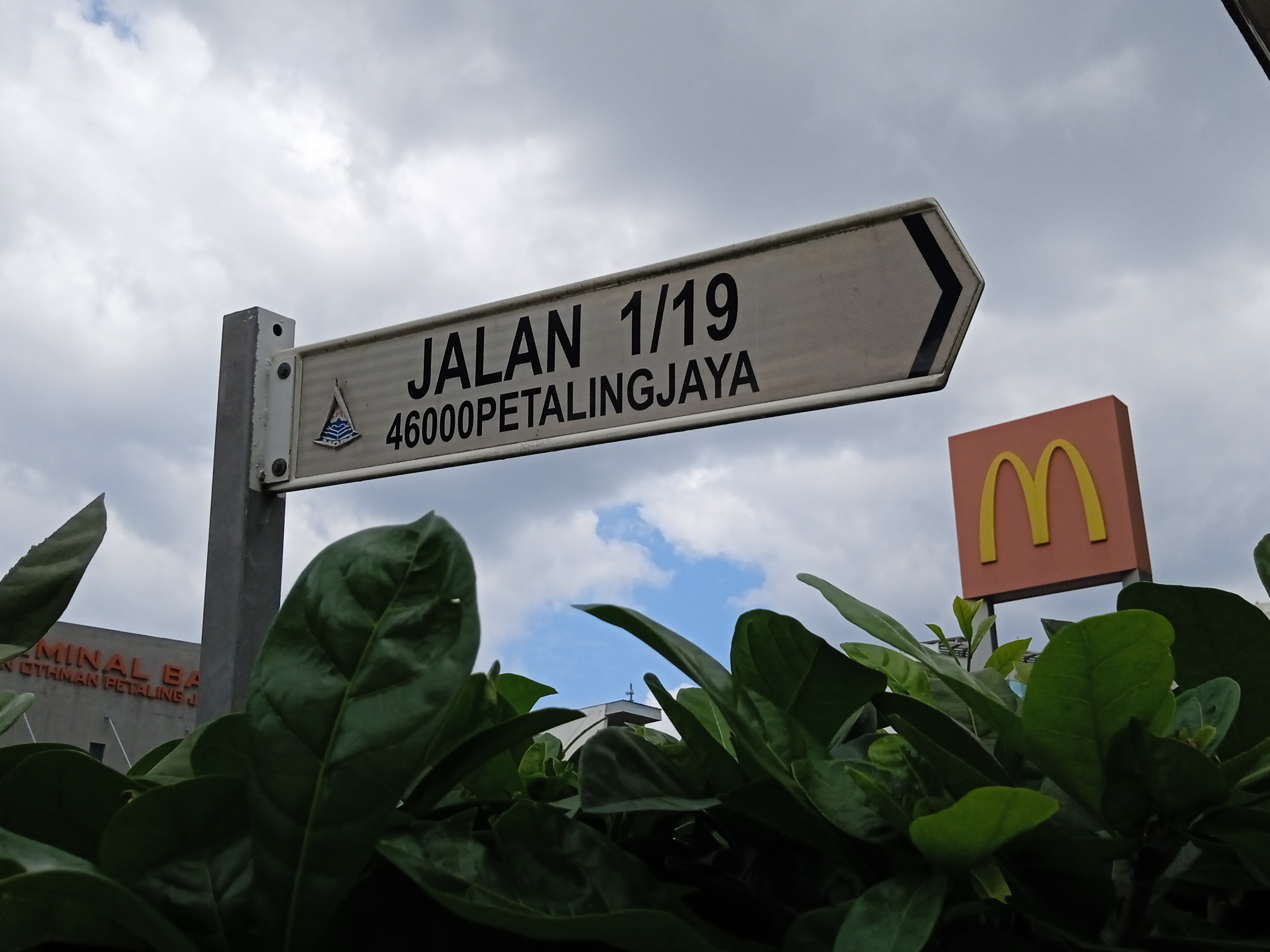
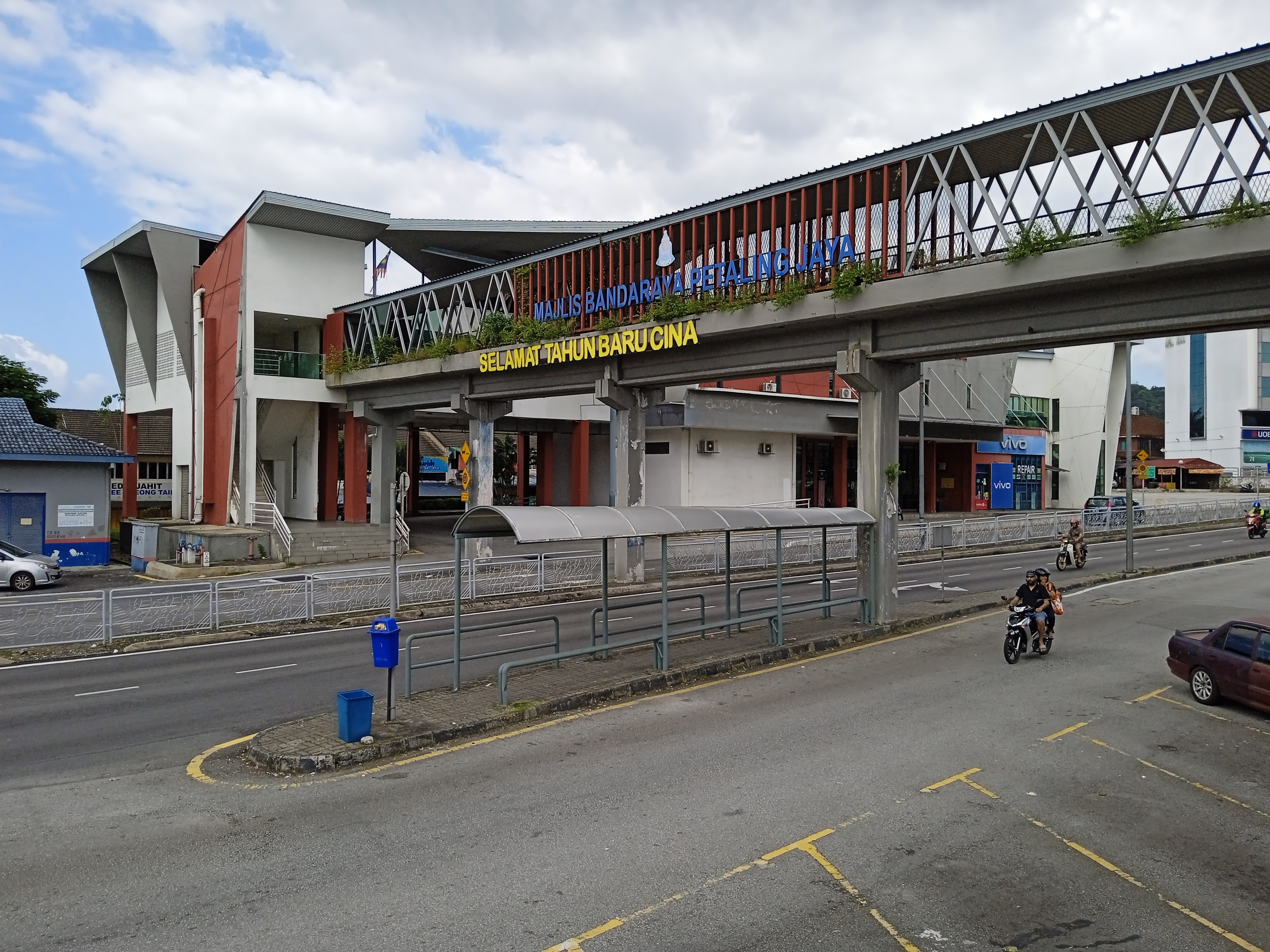
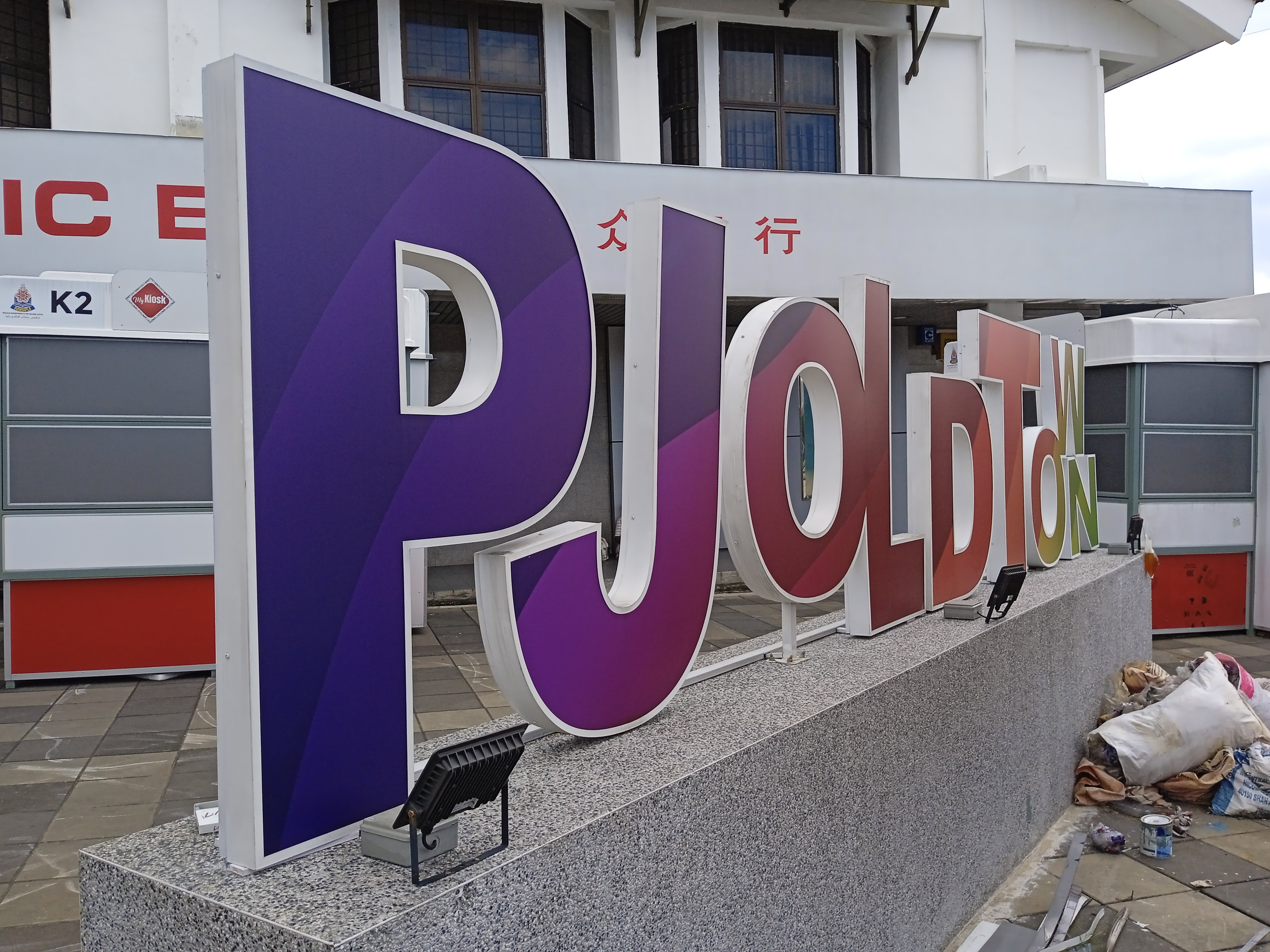
- Jalan Othman Jalan 1/19 Bus terminal Signage
- Nickname: Old Town
- Old Town, Petaling Jaya shown within Malaysia
- Coordinates: 3°07′05″N 101°37′15″E
- Country: Malaysia
- State: Selangor
- City: Petaling Jaya
- Federal seat: Petaling Jaya
- State seat: Bukit Gasing, Taman Medan

Government
  - Local Authority: MBPJ
  - Mayor: Mohd Azizi Mohd Zain
  - Member of Parliament: Lee Chean Chung
  - State Assembly Representative: Afif Bahardin, Rajiv Rishyakaran
  - Councilor: Terence Tan Teck Seng, Ermeemarianna Saadon Sang
- Time zone: UTC+8 (MST)
- Postcode: 46000
- Dialling code: +60 3778

Old Town is the oldest urban area within the city of Petaling Jaya, a combined area of four inner suburbs within one of the biggest cities in Malaysia's most developed state of Selangor.

Once the site a squatter resettlement scheme in the 1950s, the area soon became the beginning of Malaysia's first post-war new town. It is about 1km south of the city's central business district. Its local government is the Petaling Jaya City Council (MBPJ; Malay: Majlis Bandaraya Petaling Jaya).

== Location ==
Old Town is directly north of the New Pantai Expressway, a major highway connecting Subang Jaya with the federal capital of Kuala Lumpur. It borders the PJS51 industrial area to the west, the Section 6 and 7 neighbourhoods to the north, the Section 1A and 5 inner suburbs to the east, and Taman Medan and Taman Petaling Utama inner suburbs to the south.

Petaling Jaya is divided into numbered sections (also known as seksyen), which can be denoted with just S (eastern PJ), SS (central and western PJ), PJU (northern PJ), and PJS (southern PJ). The northern chunk is also known as Damansara.

== History ==
During World War II, many of Kuala Lumpur's urban population fled to the countryside to escape starvation and atrocities committed during the Japanese occupation of Malaya. After the war, these thousands returned to Malaysia's (then named Malaya) capital bringing along large numbers of people displaced by the conflict as well as by illegal immigration, leading to slums with thousands of squatters living in the outskirts of Kuala Lumpur.

Though squatters were found across the country at the time, authorities in Kuala Lumpur faced a lack of suitable land, increasing congestion and were unable to keep pace with housing demands as the city boomed from a population of 120,000 in 1936 to 300,000 by 1955.

To combat this problem, authorities in the 1950s set an area for a new township west of the capital, earmarking a 490ha rubber plantation known as Effingham Estate along Jalan Kelang Lama (or Old Klang Road) as the site of a new settlement.

In 1952, the first areas were built and defined as the neighbourhoods of Section 1 and 2. Some 800 houses by unpaved roads came up first, as housing lots were sold by colonial British authorities to locals with a 60-year leasehold period.

The first residents were some of Kuala Lumpur's former squatters, and by the mid-50s more than 1,300 housing lots were sold, with the houses built by the former squatters or by local builders, most of them detached timber units with zinc roofs.

In July 1954, an area of land next to Section 1 and 2 was levelled and identified as Section 3 and was to be set aside for the ethnic Malay population, with government servants moving in as the new area's residents.

=== The COVID-19 pandemic ===
During the 2020 COVID-19 pandemic, the Old Town market was shut down on April 27 after a seafood trader there tested positive for the virus, prompting health authorities to call for customers to get themselves screened.

The unnamed trader was also part of a COVID-19 cluster originating in the Selayang wet market -the region's largest wet market- which was previously shut down after a number of virus cases were found there.

Less than two weeks later, large parts of the township came under a full government lockdown on May 10 after the discovery of 26 COVID-19 cases from the Old Town wet market area. Thousands of people would be fenced in and prevented from leaving the area with businesses in the area closed down as security forces moved in with barb wire to cordon off over 40ha of the area from the rest of the city.

The lockdown has been scheduled to last until May 23, the lockdown was eventually lifted on May 21.

== The town ==
Consisting of four inner suburbs, Old Town today is a mix of residential houses and commercial properties and one of the busiest parts of the city. The oldest settlement in Petaling Jaya, it is colloquially known among locals as Old Town, mirroring New Town, the city's administration and commercial centre of about a kilometre away.

It is home to a bustling economic area, with several blocks of commercial shoplots and a wet market built around Jalan Selangor-Jalan Othman crossroads. The area is also host to its only high-rise residential apartment with Inai Court Apartment along Jalan Templer in Section 1 and a commercial high-rise known as Menara Mutiara Majestic in Section 3.

A sports complex which also houses the city's hockey stadium (one of two in the state of Selangor) and a skatepark sits in Section 3 along Jalan Selangor. The city's oldest hospital, the Assunta Hospital was constructed in Section 4 in 1954 and still stands today along Jalan Templer.

A motorcycle flyover connecting Old Town with Taman Medan crossing the New Pantai Expressway can also be found at the settlement's south.

== Education ==
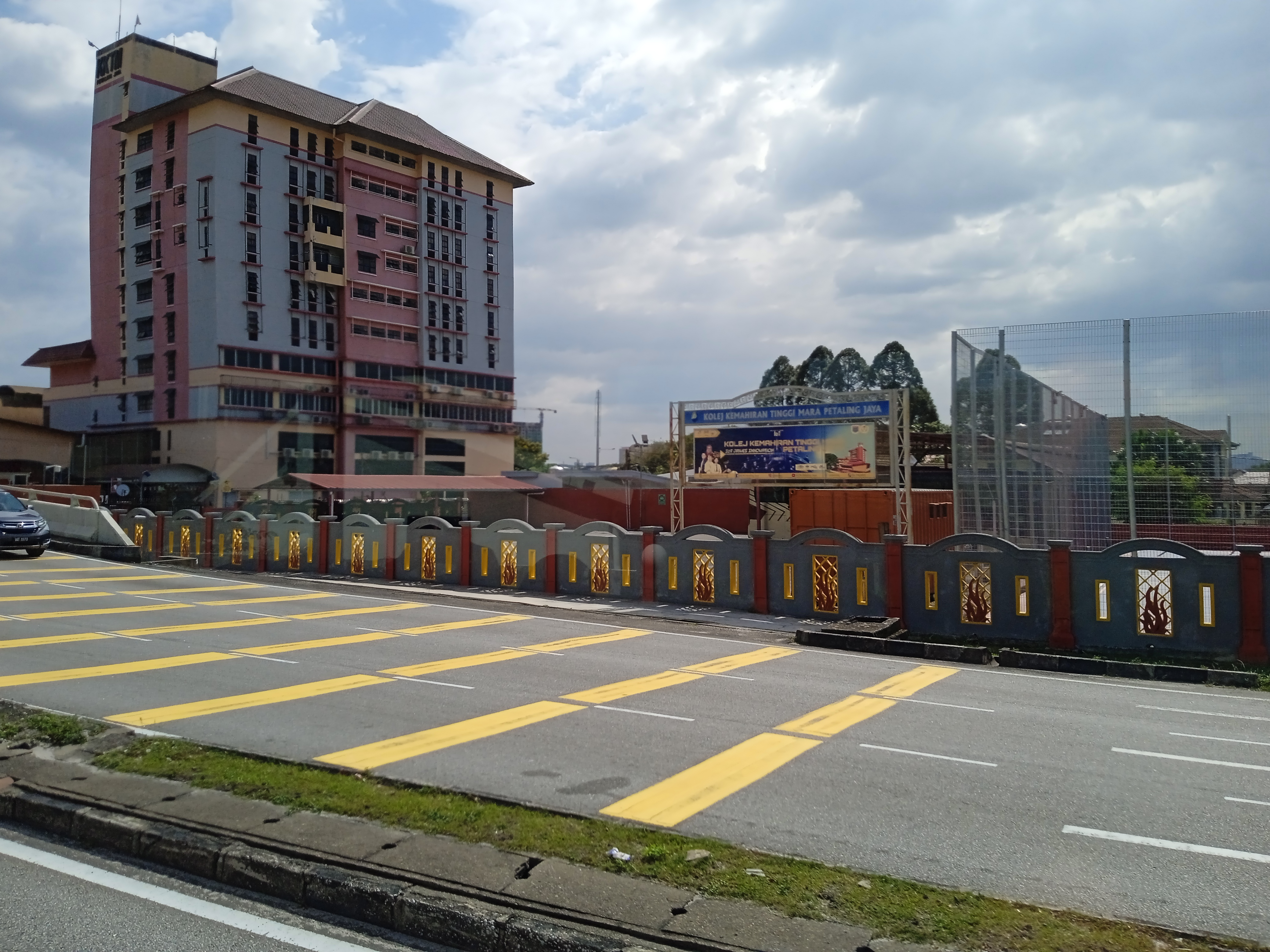
Kolej Kemahiran Tinggi MARA Petaling Jaya

Old Town is home to several schools, including the two Assunta primary missionary schools -the city's oldest educational institutions- that sit side by side with each other in Section 4.

The schools were set up by Sister Enda Ryan, a nun who also spearheaded the formation of the Assunta secondary school.

The area is also home to several national primary schools: Jalan Selangor (1), Petaling Jaya (1) and Petaling Jaya (2).

The Ibnu Rusyd Kawasan Melayu religious primary school also sits here, along with the Chen Moh Chinese-language school, as well as the privately-run Madeleine Kindergarten and the state-run Tabika Kemas Inai Merah MPPJ kindergarten.

Old Town also hosts the Bumiputera-only public university Universiti Teknologi MARA's Jalan Othman campus, also the university's first, as well as a MARA community college in Section 1.

The Tun Tan Cheng Lock Assunta nursing college in Section 4 formed by Catholic nuns in 1961 also sits here, next to the privately-run Assunta Hospital, the city's oldest hospital.

== Representation ==
The current Member of Parliament is Petaling Jaya's Maria Chin Abdullah, an independent candidate who ran under the Pakatan Harapan banner in the 2018 Malaysian general election.

The area is also served by two assemblymen, Syamsul Firdaus Mohamed Supri from the People's Justice Party (Malaysia) (PKR) and Rajiv Rishyakaran from the Democratic Action Party (DAP).

The area's two councilors are Terence Tan Teck Seng and Ermeemarianna Saadon.

== Religion ==
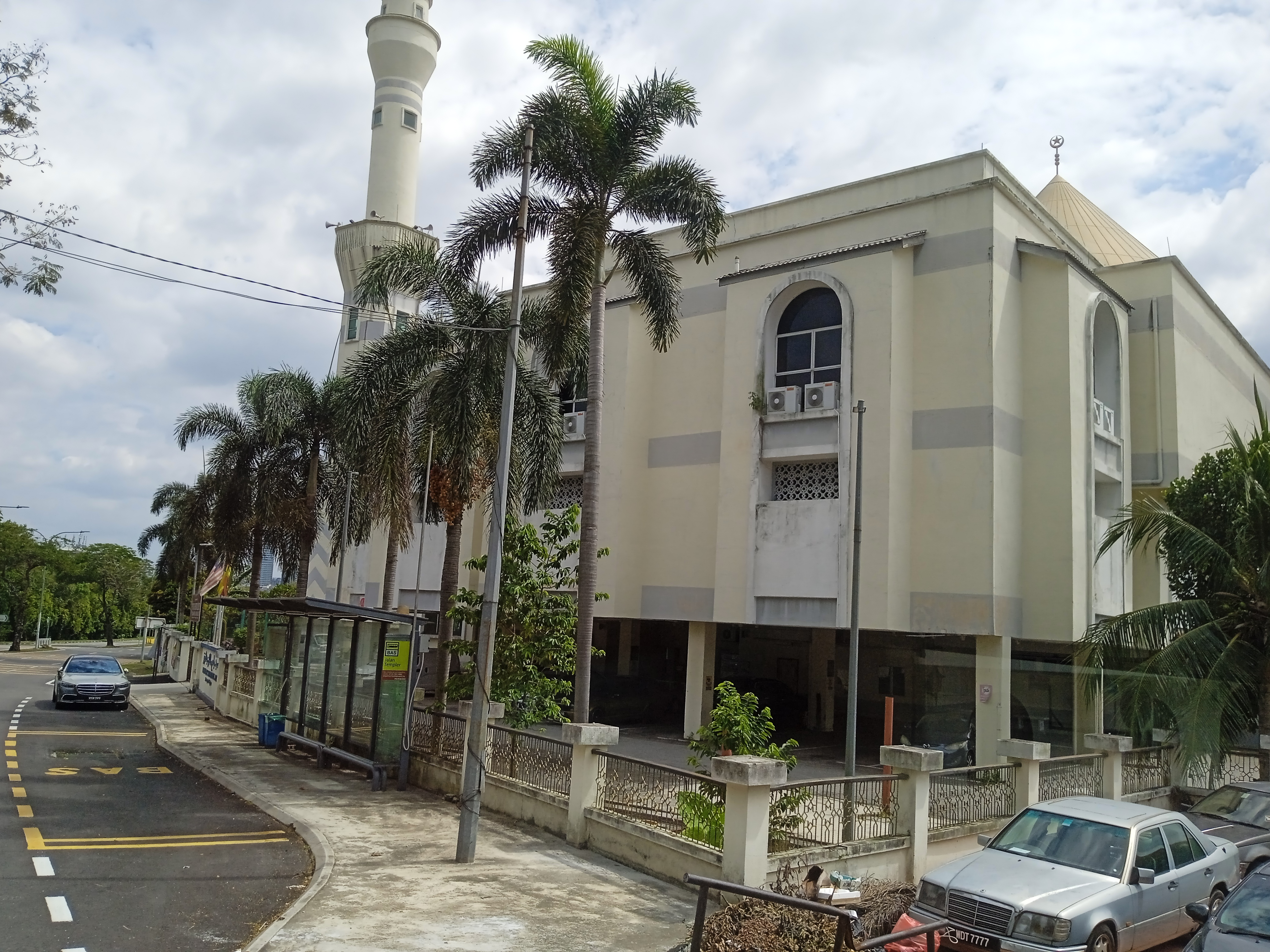
Sultan Abdul Aziz Shah Jamek Mosque (Masjid Jamek Sultan Abdul Aziz Shah)

As the city's oldest settlement, Old Town is home to Petaling Jaya's oldest mosque, the Sultan Abdul Aziz Shah Jamek Mosque (Masjid Jamek Sultan Abdul Aziz) built in Section 3 in 1957. Renovated over the years, it can now accommodate up to 5,000 people.

There are also several other places of worship dedicated to the Muslim, Christian, Buddhist and Hindu faiths: including:

- Surau Al-Islah
- Surau Al-islah S4
- Hung Shing Temple (洪聖宫廟), founded in 1935
- Yuan Lin Xiao Zhot Buddhist Temple (园林小筑)
- Kwan Inn Teng Buddhist Temple (八打灵观音亭)
- Sau Seng Lum Buddhist Temple (修成林)
- Sun Hoon Keong Temple (山云宫)
- Yu Huang Miao Temple (玉皇廟)
- Assumption Church
- Emmanuel Baptist church
- Good Shepherd Lutheran Church
- Jalan Tiga Gospel Hall
- True Jesus Church PJ
- Sri Sithi Vinayagar Hindu temple

== Transport ==
Transportation in Old Town of Petaling Jaya
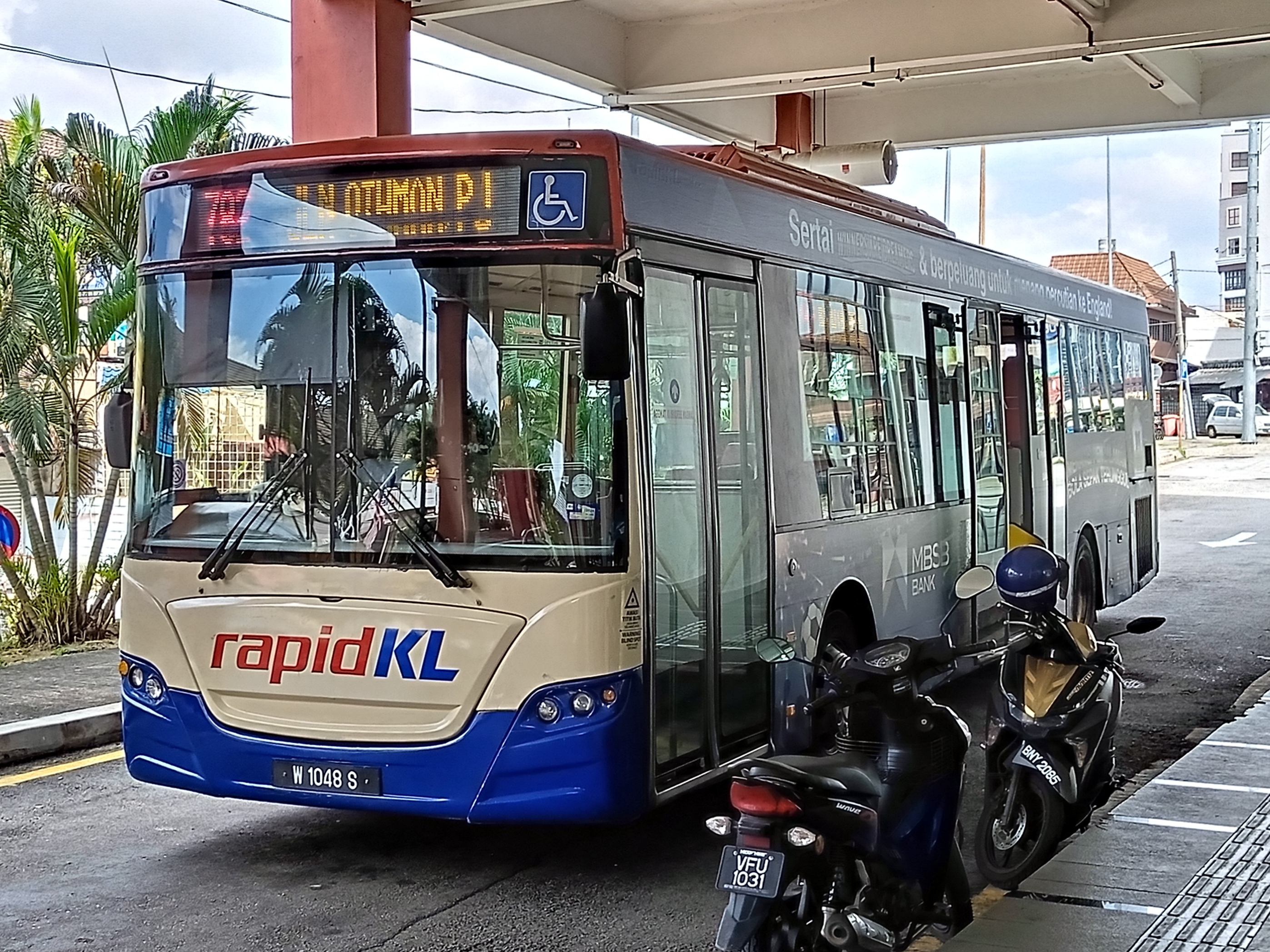
Rapid KL bus route 782 connect Old Town to Pasar Seni station in Kuala Lumpur

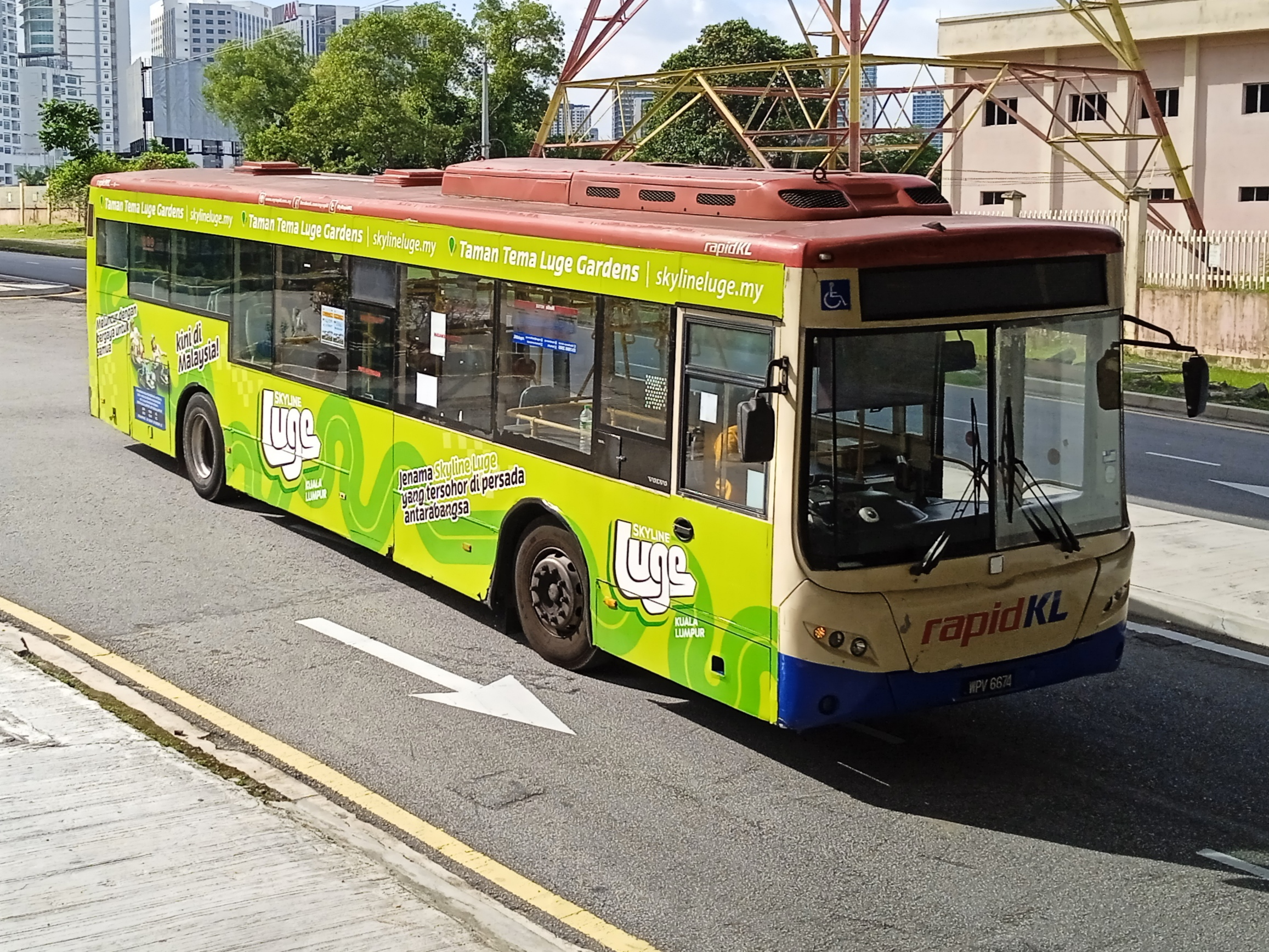
Rapid KL bus route T640 served a connection to Taman Jaya LRT station

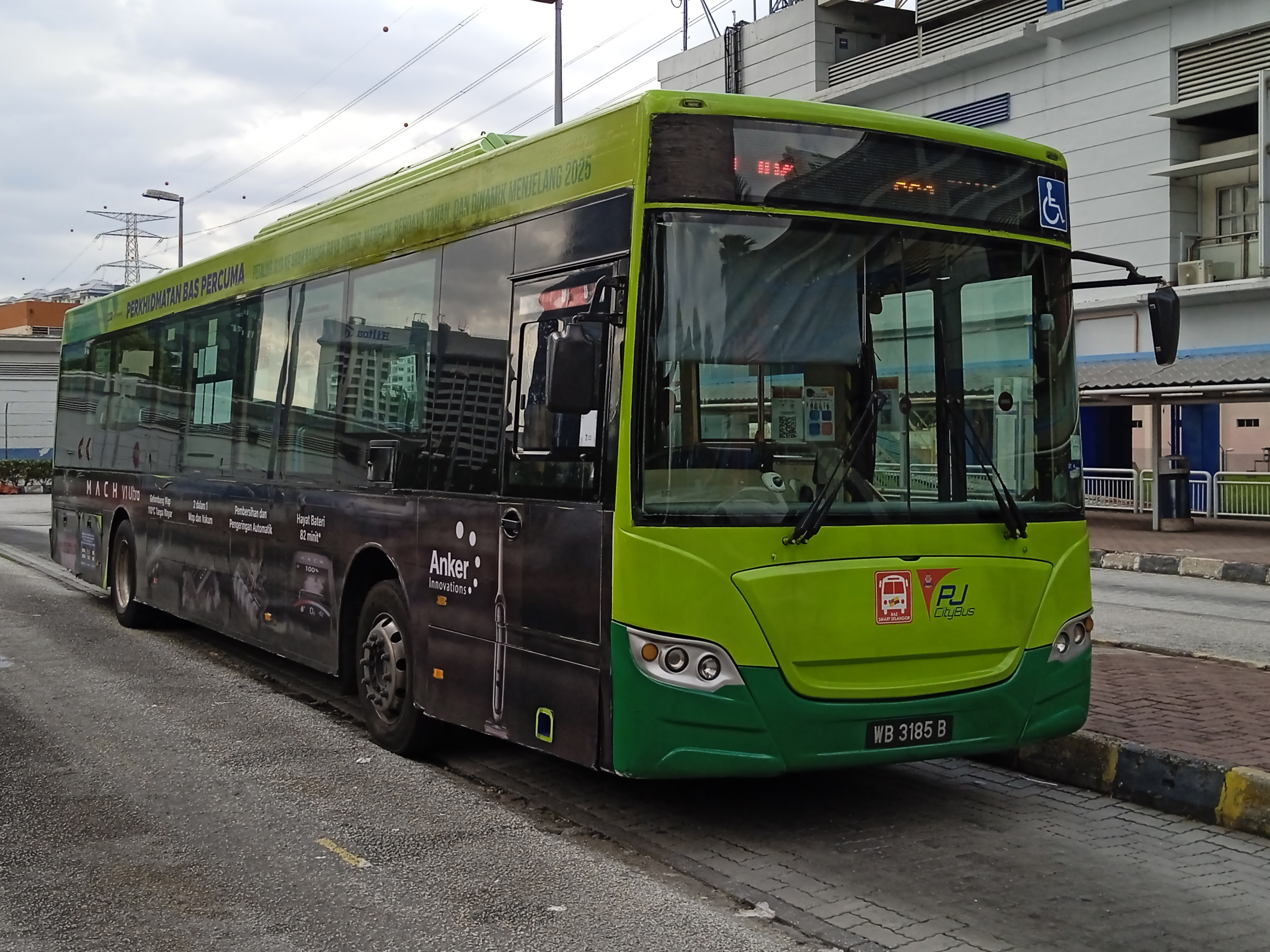
PJ City Bus route PJ02 stopped at Taman Jaya LRT Bus Hub (code – PJ445)

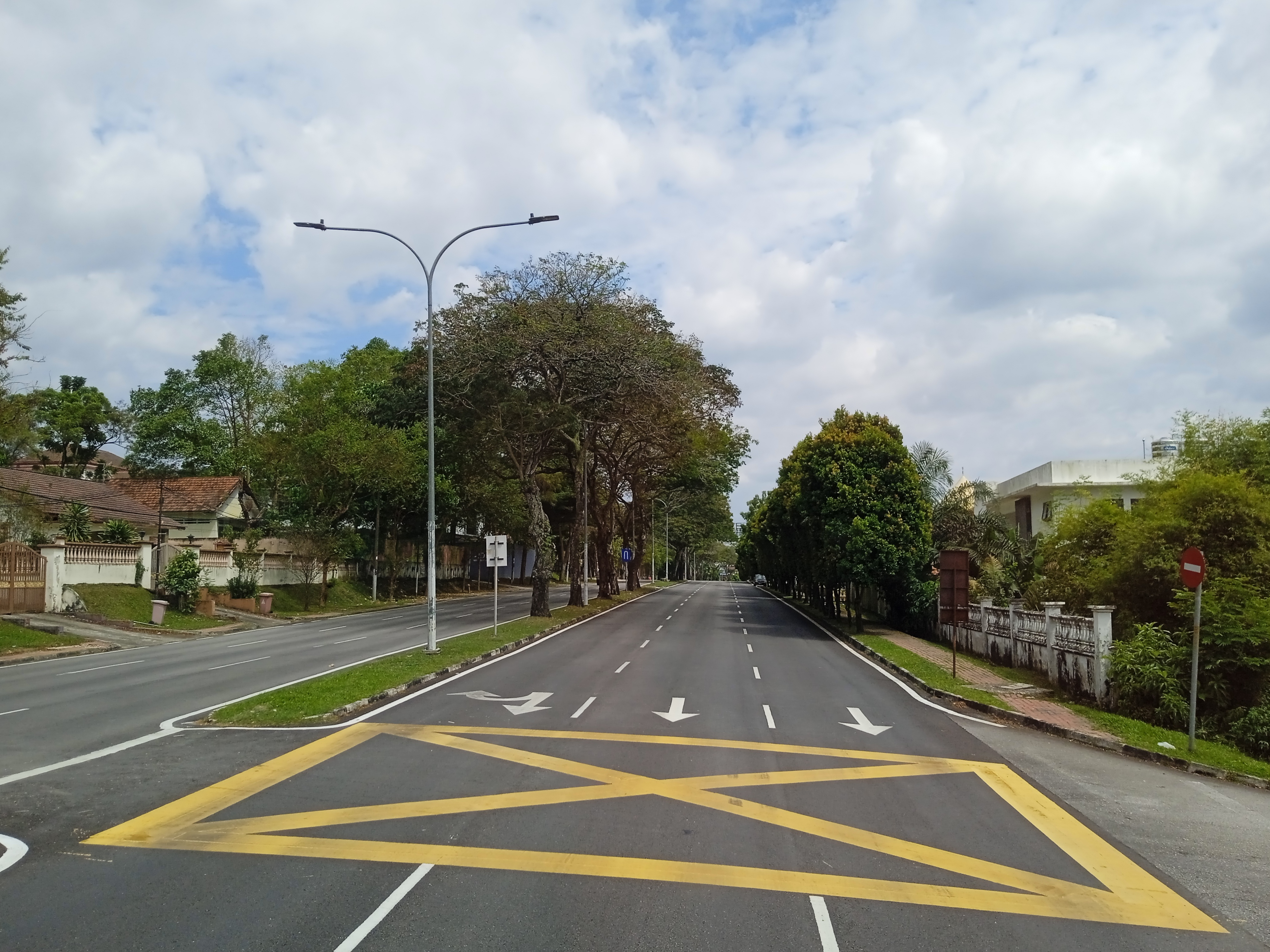
Jalan Templer

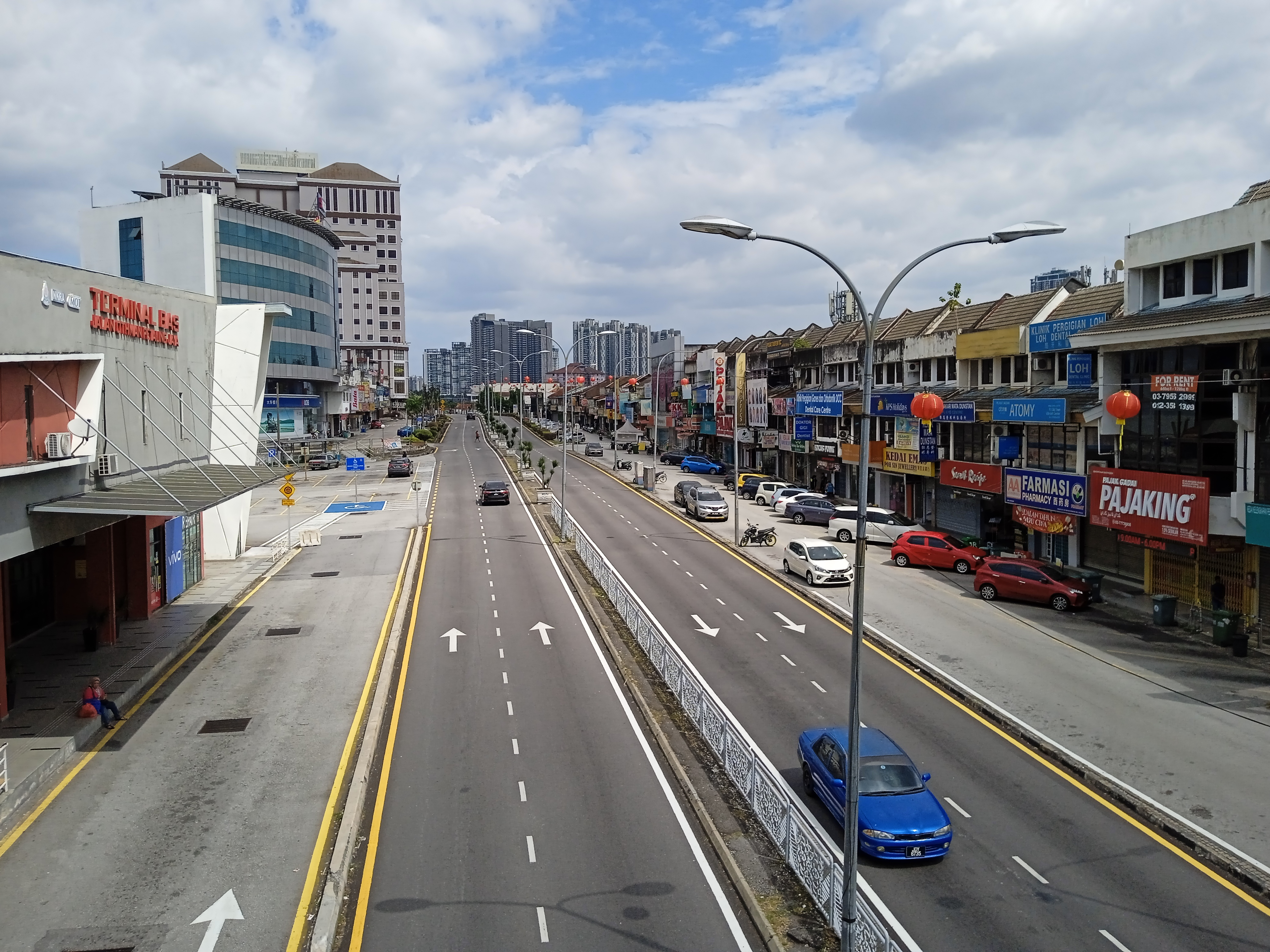
Jalan Othman

Roads in Old Town are some of the most heavily used in the city, with the neighbourhood bordering the New Pantai Expressway which acts a link connecting Subang Jaya to the west and Kuala Lumpur to the east. The area is also next to the administrative center of Section 52 (otherwise known as PJ New Town), the industrial area of Section 51 as well as the major city roads of Jalan Gasing and Jalan Templer, which connects many of Petaling Jaya's southern inner suburbs to the Federal Highway, one of the country's busiest highways.

The area is also served by a bus terminal in the middle of the township, with some of the RapidKL and PJ Free City buses stopping here to pick up passengers heading to the rest of Petaling Jaya and Kuala Lumpur. The neighbourhood is also next to the Jalan Templer KTM Komuter station, which is served by KTM Komuter's Tanjung Malim–Port Klang Line, connecting the seaside city of Port Klang in the southwest to Tanjung Malim in the north via Kuala Lumpur.

Route No.	Origin	Destination	Via	Remarks
781	Seri Manja Bus Hub	Public Bank (opposite), Jalan Syed Putra, Kuala Lumpur	Inai Court Apartment, Jalan Templer Universiti Teknologi MARA's Jalan Othman campus (opposite); McDonald's, Jalan Othman; Wet market, Jalan Othman; Old Town bus terminal Makhamah Syariah, Jalan Othman; Inai Court Apartment (opposite), Jalan Templer	
782	Old Town bus terminal	Public Bank (opposite), Jalan Syed Putra, Kuala Lumpur	Makhamah Syariah, Jalan Othman Rumah Teres, Jalan 1/32; SRK Petaling, Jalan Templer; Masjid, Jalan Templer; SPG Jalan 3/69D, Jalan Templer; Hockey Stadium, Jalan Selangor; PJ Community Library, Jalan Selangor	
T640	KJ22 Taman Jaya LRT	Taman Sri Sentosa	Jalan Penchala, Section 4 Jalan Othman, Section 2 Old Town bus terminal Makhamah Syariah, Jalan Othman; Inai Court Apartment	
PJ01	Taman Medan	University Malaya Medical Centre	Inai Court Apartment Fakulti Sains Kesihatan UITM, Jalan Othman Makhamah Syariah, Jalan Othman; Old Town bus terminal PJ Community Library, Jalan Selangor; Sekolah Kebangsaan Jalan Selangor	
