= Jalan Templer =

Road in Malaysia

Route information
- Existed: 1952–present
- History: Completed in 1952

Major junctions
- West end: Jalan Templer interchange FT 2 Federal Highway
- Jalan PP Narayanan; FT 2 Federal Highway; Jalan Penchala; Jalan Selangor; Jalan Gasing; Jalan Othman; New Pantai Expressway New Pantai Expressway; FT 2 Jalan Klang Lama
- Southeast end: Jalan Templer interchange New Pantai Expressway New Pantai Expressway and FT 2Jalan Klang Lama

Location
- Country: Malaysia
- Primary destinations: Petaling Jaya New Town; Petaling Jaya Old Town

Highway system
- Highways in Malaysia; Expressways; Federal; State

Jalan Templer is a major road in Petaling Jaya city, Selangor, Malaysia. It was the first road built in Petaling Jaya and was called Jalan 1 or Road 1. The road was named after the former British High Commissioner in Malaya, Sir Gerald Templer.

== Landmarks ==
- SJK (T) Viviekananda
- Maktab Kerjasama Malaysia (MKM)
- Petaling Jaya Assumption Church
- Assunta Hospital
- Sultan Abdul Aziz Shah Jamek Mosque

== List of junctions ==
km	Exit	Junctions	To	Remarks
			West; Jalan PP Narayanan (Jalan 222); Section—until --	
Jalan PP Narayanan (Jalan 222); MBPJ border limit
FT 2 Federal Highway; JKR border limit
		Jalan Templer-Federal Highway	FT 2 Federal Highway Northeast; Kuala Lumpur Southwest; Subang Jaya; Shah Alam; Klang	Diamond interchange
FT 2 Federal Highway; JKR border limit
Jalan Templer; MBPJ border limit
		Section --	South; Highway Centre; Petaling Jaya industrial area	West bound
		SJK (T) Viviekananda		
		Section --		
		Toyota Auction Centre		
		Bulatan Penchala	Jalan Penchala North; Jalan Sultan; Petaling Jaya New Town (Section --) South; Petaling Jaya industrial area (Section --); Jalan Othman; Petaling Jaya Old Town (Section 1)	Roundabout
		Jalan Ru (Jalan 7/1)	North; Jalan Ru (Jalan 7/1); Section -- Jalan Yong Shook Lin; Jalan Sultan	East bound
		Maktab Kerjasama Malaysia (MKM)		East bound
		Petaling Jaya Assumption Church		West bound
		Assunta Hospital		West bound
		Bulatan Assunta	Jalan Selangor North; Jalan Yong Shook Lin; Petaling Jaya New Town (Section --) South; Petaling Jaya Old Town (Section 1)	Roundabout
		Sultan Abdul Aziz Shah Jamek Mosque		
		Section --		
		Bulatan Gasing	North; Jalan Gasing; Section—until -- Jalan Universiti; Universiti Malaya; University Malaya Medical Centre West; Jalan Othman; Petaling Jaya Old Town (Section 1)	Roundabout with ramp to Jalan Gasing
		Railway crossing bridge		
		Jalan Templer-NPE	New Pantai Expressway New Pantai Expressway; Northeast; Bangsar; Kuala Lumpur; Seremban	Ramp to NPE from west
Jalan Templer; MBPJ border limit
FT 2 Jalan Klang Lama
		Jalan Templer-Jalan Klang Lama	FT 2 Jalan Klang Lama West; New Pantai Expressway New Pantai Expressway; Bandar Sunway; Subang Jaya; Shah Alam; Klang East; Puchong; Kuchai Lama; Seremban	T-junctions
