= Jalan Gasing =

Road in Malaysia

Route information
- Existed: 1960–present
- History: Completed in 1961

Major junctions
- Northwest end: Jalan Gasing interchange FT 2 Federal Highway
- Jalan Universiti; FT 2 Federal Highway; Jalan Changgai; Jalan Templer
- South end: Bulatan Gasing roundabout

Location
- Country: Malaysia
- Primary destinations: University Malaya; University Malaya Medical Centre; Petaling Jaya New Town; Petaling Jaya Old Town

Highway system
- Highways in Malaysia; Expressways; Federal; State

Jalan Gasing is a major road in Petaling Jaya city, Selangor, Malaysia. It is the first dual-carriageway road built in Malaysia since independence. It also has the most number or churches in a single street in Malaysia.

== Landmarks ==
- SMK(P)Taman Petaling
- EPF headquarters
- Catholic High School, Petaling Jaya
- St. Francis Xavier's Church
- Church
- Taman Jaya
- Wat Chetawan Buddhist temple
- La Salle Primary School
- La Salle Secondary School
- Bukit Gasing
- Bulatan Templer roundabout

== List of junctions ==
km	Exit	Junctions	To	Remarks
			Northwest; Jalan Universiti; Section—until -- University Malaya; University Malaya Medical Centre	
		Jalan Templer-Federal Highway	FT 2 Federal Highway Northeast; Kuala Lumpur	Half diamond interchange
		Saint Francis Xavier Church		
		Section --	Section -- KWSP building	South bound
		Section 10	Section 10; Catholic High School, Petaling Jaya	North bound
		Church		
		Taman Jaya	Taman Jaya Taman Jaya; Petaling Jaya Museum	North bound
		Jalan Pantai (Jalan 9/7)	West; Jalan Pantai (Jalan 9/7); Wat Chetawan (Siamese temple)	North bound
		Sekolah Kebangsaan La Salle		
		Jalan Changgai (Jalan 6/22)	West; Jalan Changgai (Jalan 6/22); Jalan Selangor; Petaling Jaya New Town (Section --); SMK Assunta	T-junctions
		Jalan Bukit Gasing	East; Jalan Bukit Gasing; Bukit Gasing	
		Jalan --		
		Jalan --		
		Simpang Empat Templer	Jalan Templer West; Section—until -- FT 2 Federal Highway; Kuala Lumpur; Shah Alam; Klang East; FT 2 Jalan Klang Lama; Kuchai Lama; Puchong; New Pantai Expressway New Pantai Expressway; Bangsar; Kuala Lumpur; Seremban; Bandar Sunway; Subang Jaya Southwest; Jalan Othman; Petaling Jaya Old Town (Section 1)	
