= Edward Lee Poh Lin =

Malaysian politician

Member of the Selangor State Legislative Assembly for Bukit Gasing
- In office 8 March 2008 – 20 December 2011
- Preceded by: Lim Thuang Seng (BN–Gerakan)
- Succeeded by: Rajiv Rishyakaran (PR–DAP)
- Majority: 8,812 (2008)

Personal details
- Born: 1949 or 1950 (age 75–76)
- Died: 20 December 2011 (aged 61)
- Party: Democratic Action Party (DAP)
- Other political affiliations: Pakatan Rakyat (PR)
- Website: http://edwardleepj.blogspot.com/

Edward Lee Poh Lin (1949/50 – 20 December 2011) was a Malaysian politician who served as Member of the Selangor State Legislative Assembly (MLA) for Bukit Gasing from March 2008 to his death in December 2011. He was a member of the Democratic Action Party (DAP), a component party of then the Pakatan Rakyat (PR) coalition. He was also a member of the State Transparency Committee (SELCAT).

== Political career ==
In the Malaysian 2008 General Elections, he won the seat of Bukit Gasing, Selangor, on a party ticket of the DAP and received 15,735 votes with a majority of 8,812 votes.

== Election results ==
Selangor State Legislative Assembly'
Year	Constituency	Candidate	Votes	Pct	Opponent(s)	Votes	Pct	Ballots cast	Majority	Turnout
2008	N34 Bukit Gasing	Edward Lee Poh Lin (DAP)	15,735	69.45%	Lim Thuang Seng (Gerakan)	6,923	30.55%	22,875	8,812	68.94%

== Death ==
On 20 December 2011, Edward Lee Poh Lin died of cancer at the age of 61.
