= Merdekarya =

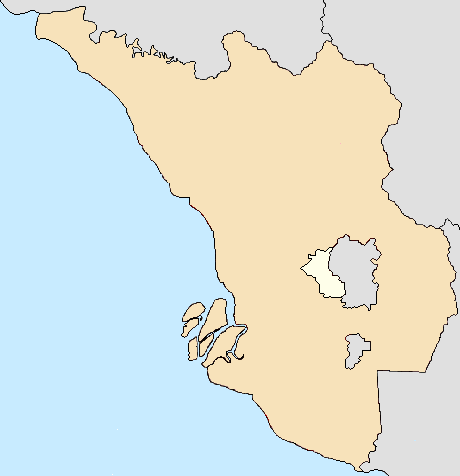
- Location within Petaling Jaya

Restaurant information
- Established: January 11, 2013
- Owners: Brian Gomez, Melani Delilkan
- Dress code: Casual
- Location: 352, First Floor, Jalan 5/57, Petaling Garden, Petaling Jaya, Petaling, Selangor, 46000, Malaysia
- Coordinates: 3.0863788311433495°N 101.65764426442284°E
- Seating capacity: 80
- Website: www.merdekarya.com

Merdekarya is a live music bar in Section 5, Petaling Jaya near the city's old town district that was established in 2013. Located primarily on the first floor of a commercial shoplot in inner suburban Petaling Jaya, it is one of the few venues in Malaysia dedicated to independent music artistes.

== Overview ==
Merdekarya is a combination of two Malay words: Merdeka and karya, which mean freedom and art respectively. Founded by Brian Gomez and Melani Delilkan in 2013, Merdekarya was born out of the lack of available spaces for independent Malaysian music. Pub owners at the time, according to Gomez, preferred visiting musicians to play cover songs and to stay away from politically themed music.

Starting off with hosting open mic sessions for local musicians, the place grew into an independent arts venue which included film screenings, book launches and poetry slams. With a seating capacity of about 80 people, the bar today is open from Tuesday to Saturday, featuring bands and acts such as Kirsten Long, Hey Jay!, Azmyl Yunor and Skies Are Red.

The bar eventually expanded to two floors, with the top floor hosting music performances with a restaurant on the ground floor.

During the COVID-19 pandemic, the bar—like many similar businesses at the time—had to shut down their operations when the government came up with the Malaysian movement control order in March 2020. With social distancing measures clamping down on live music and large crowds, Merdekarya had to survive by focusing on their menu, coming up with two separate kitchens to pump out food options for their customers.

As the pandemic wound down, Merdekarya faced further pressure in February 2022 from local authorities to close their live bar and stop their shows, due to a string of contradictory messages and red tape. At the time, they were warned that they would be slapped with a 25,000 ringgit fine from the Petaling Jaya City Council if they went ahead and resumed their gigs. The episode prompted Maria Chin Abdullah, the local Member of Parliament to intervene and reverse the council's move to suspend Merdekarya from running its business, as the MBPJ said it would review its policy prohibiting live music in the city.

Following claims of harassment by council officers, shows at Merdekarya eventually resumed as Malaysia's government announced it would be entering an endemic phase of COVID-19 restrictions, as daily infection rates wound down.
