= Jalan PP Narayanan =

Road in Malaysia

Jalan PP Narayanan (Jalan 222)

Major junctions
- West end: Bulatan Jalan 229 small roundabout
- Jalan 229; FT 2 Federal Highway; Jalan Templer
- East end: Jalan Templer interchange FT 2 Federal Highway

Location
- Country: Malaysia

Highway system
- Highways in Malaysia; Expressways; Federal; State

Jalan PP Narayanan or Jalan 222 is a major road in Petaling Jaya city, Selangor, Malaysia. On Google Maps, it is listed as Persiaran P.P. Narayanan. The road was named after the Malaysian Trade Union Congress's (MTUC) first president, P.P. Narayanan.

== List of junctions ==
km	Exit	Junctions	To	Remarks
			West; Jalan 51A/224	
		Bulatan Jalan 51A/229	Jalan 51A/229 Northwest; Jalan Baiduri (Jalan SS1/22); Kampung Tunku (SS1) South; Jalan 51A/225; Seri Setia	Small roundabout
Jalan PP Narayanan (Jalan 222)
		Jalan 14/48	North; Jalan 14/48; Sea Park (Section 20 and 21); Aman Recreational Park	T-junctions
		Jalan 51A/227	North; Jalan 51A/227	
		Jalan 51A/223	North; Jalan 51A/223; Jalan Dato Abdul Aziz (Jalan 14/29); Jalan Dato Jamil Rais (Jalan 14/15); Jalan Professor Khoo Kay Kim (Jalan Semangat); Section 14	
		Jalan 51A/225	Southwest; Jalan 51A/225	
		Sungai Penchala bridge		
Jalan PP Narayanan (Jalan 222); MBPJ border limit
FT 2 Federal Highway; JKR border limit
		Jalan Templer-Federal Highway	FT 2 Federal Highway Northeast; Kuala Lumpur Southwest; Subang Jaya; Shah Alam; Klang	Diamond interchange
FT 2 Federal Highway; JKR border limit
Jalan Templer; MBPJ border limit
			East; Jalan Templer; Petaling Jaya New Town; Petaling Jaya Old Town	
