= Wat Chetawan =

Buddhist temple in Malaysia

- Malay: Wat Chetawan; Thai: วัดเชตวัน
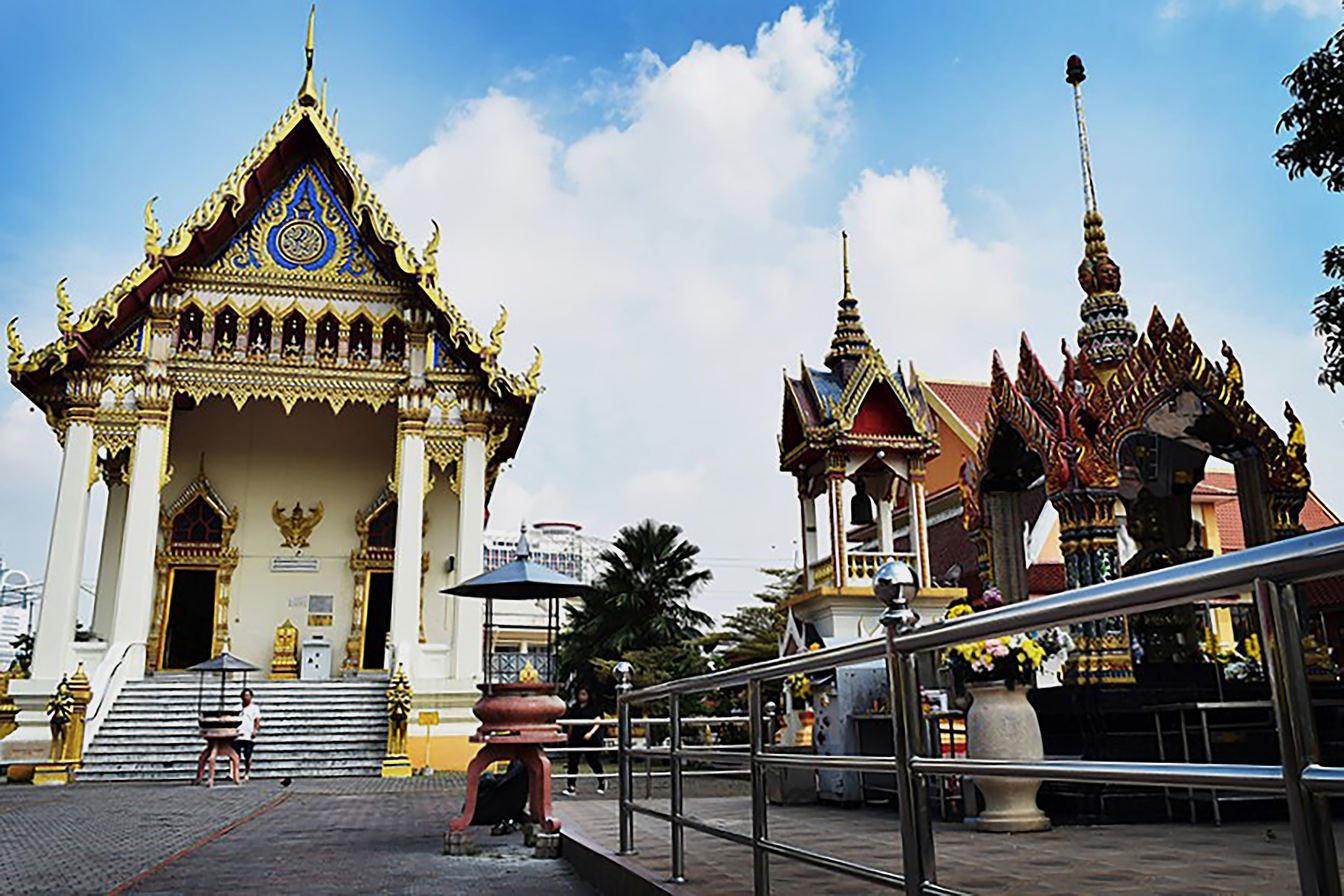
- Front view of the temple

Religion
- Affiliation: Buddhism
- District: Petaling District

Location
- Location: Petaling Jaya
- State: Selangor
- Country: Malaysia
- Interactive map of Wat Chetawan
- Coordinates: 3°6′10.123″N 101°39′5.747″E

Architecture
- Type: Thai temple
- Founder: Phra Kru Palat Vieng
- Established: 1957
- Completed: 1962
- Construction cost: RM250,000 – RM1.9 million

Website
- sites.google.com/site/watchetawan

Wat Chetawan (Thai: วัดเชตวัน; RTGS: Wat Chetawan) (also called as the Chetawan Buddhist Temple) is a Thai temple in Petaling District, Selangor, Malaysia. The temple is situated at Jalan Pantai, off Jalan Gasing in Petaling Jaya. It was built in 1957 and officiated by the late King Bhumibol Adulyadej, the King of Thailand at the time. The temple is also the only Malaysian Siamese temple which has been chosen as the custodian of the Buddha sacred relics for all Malaysian Buddhists that are parts of the ancient relics discovered in Piprahwa, a village in Uttar Pradesh near the border of the Kingdom of Nepal in 1898 which were presented to King Chulalongkorn of Siam by the then British Viceroy of India, Lord Curzon. (Note: According to the chief abbot of Wat Chetawan, Phra Khru Sophitchariyaphorn, Buddha's relics enshrined in the stupa is of great historical and religious significance as it was part of relics discovered in Piprahwa, a village in Uttar Pradesh near the border of the Kingdom of Nepal in 1898 which then presented to King Chulalongkorn of Siam by the then British Viceroy of India, Lord Curzon. King Chulalongkorn distributed part of the relics to Japan, Myanmar, Sri Lanka and Siberia and the rest were ceremoniously enshrined in the Golden Mount Chedi in Bangkok in 1899. To commemorate the 2,600th anniversary of Buddha's Enlightenment and to mark King Bhumibol Adulyadej and Queen Sirikit's 85th and 80th birthday anniversaries respectively, a portion of those sacred relics of Buddha were presented to Wat Chetawan in Malaysia on 27 June 2012 by senior monk from Bangkok, Somdej Phramaharatch Amangkalajarn as a token of goodwill from Thai Buddhists to Malaysian Buddhists.)

== History ==
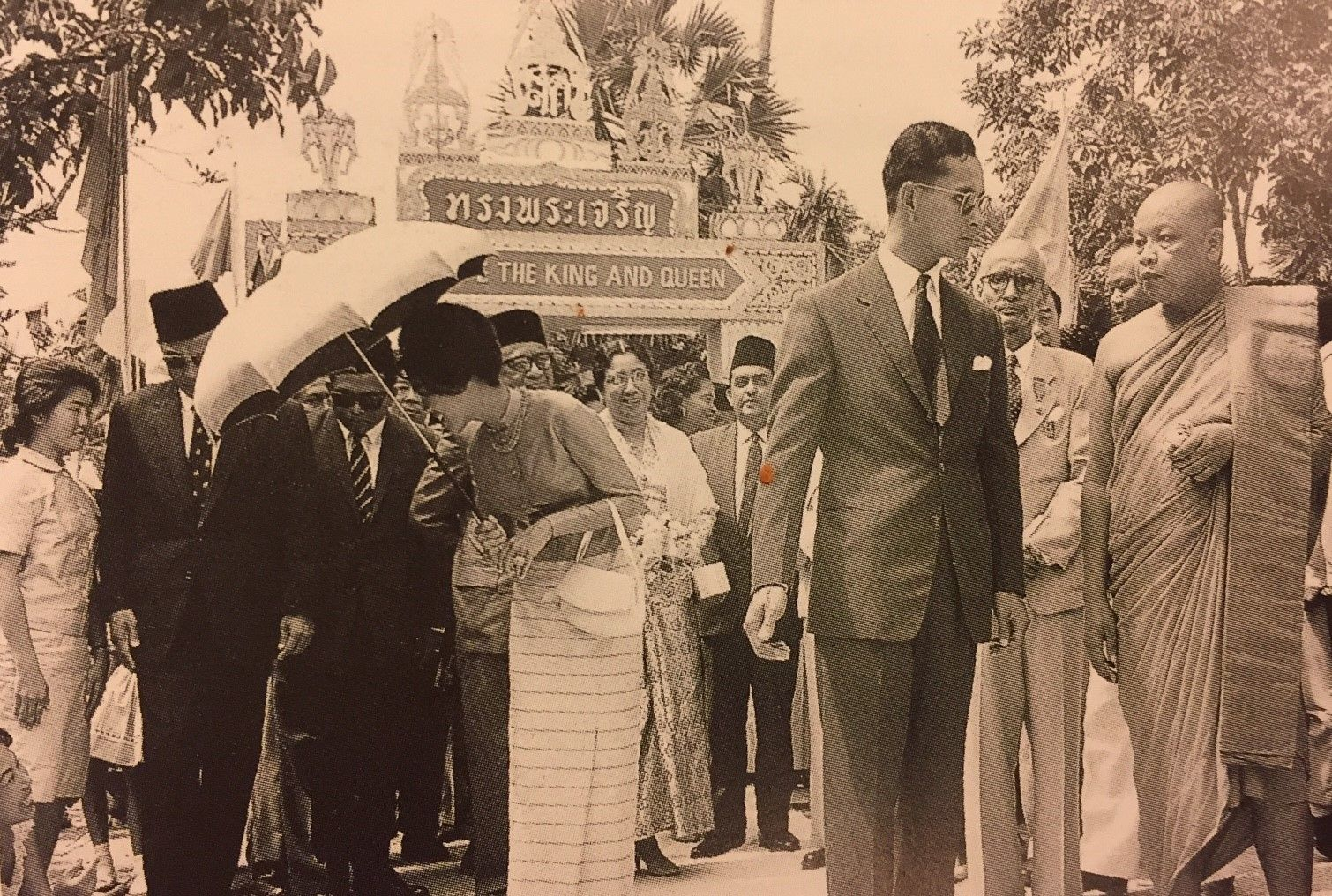
King Bhumibol Adulyadej and Queen Sirikit visiting the temple during their state visit in 1962.

In 1956, Phra Kru Palat Vieng, a veteran member of the sangha (community of monks) and an old time resident of Kuala Lumpur initiated the idea of building a sizeable Buddhist temple close to the federal capital of Malaya. The proposal was warmly welcomed by the state government of Selangor where they allocated two acres of land as the proposed site of the temple the following year. Another piece of land measuring two and half acres was acquired through donations collected from well-wishers from both Malaya and Thailand and his own savings. Besides the generous donations from well-wishers, King Bhumibol Adulyadej of Thailand's personally contributed to the temple construction funds through his state visit in 1962. The federal government of Malaya at the time also rallied to the good cause by giving a grant through Prime Minister Tunku Abdul Rahman.

As the planned structure was to reflect the finest of Thai temple architecture, the Fine Arts Department of Thailand in Bangkok was commissioned to draw up the architectural plans and to oversee the construction of the temple. With the combined workforce of local builders and skilled craftsmen from Thailand, the main shrine together with the temple structures was completed on 26 June 1962 and officiated by the King himself accompanied by Queen Sirikit. During the special ceremony, the King raising the temple's decorative roof element of chofa. This was followed with the visits for religious ceremonies by Princess Sirindhorn, Crown Prince Vajiralongkorn and Princess Galyani Vadhana. King Bhumibol also had granted the royal consent for the King royal insignia to be mounted on the front gable of the building and personally donating the main Buddha shrine of Phra Buddha Thammeen, a rare honour that reflected the King special consideration and compassion towards the construction of the temple. Since then, no additional structures were added until under the abbotship of Phra Khru Sophitchariyaphorn (Pien Saccadhammo). In 2009, stupa are being added to the temple where the construction was completed in 2012 with a cost of RM1.9 million. To commemorate the 2,600th anniversary of Buddha's Enlightenment as well marking the birthday's of King Bhumibol and Queen Sirikit, a portion of sacred relics of Buddha were presented to the temple on 27 June 2012 by the President of the executive committee of His Holiness the Supreme Patriarch of Thailand and Member of the Sangha Supreme Council of Thailand, Somdej Phrabuddhacharn as a goodwill from Thai Buddhists to Malaysian Buddhists.

== Features ==
Apart from become the centre for religious community of Malaysian Siamese, the temple also become the place of devotees from non-Thais. The main shrine is heavily gilded in gold leaves and intricately decorated with multi-coloured glass tiles. Its main prayer hall houses several images of Buddha while in the pavilion features the four-faced God, Phra Phrom and the Bodhisattva of Compassion, Guan Yin. Another prayer hall pays tribute to abbots with Malay titles that marked their northern Malay Peninsula and southern Thai origin. The temple always welcoming donation from visitors which will be mainly used to sustain the temple and its activities.

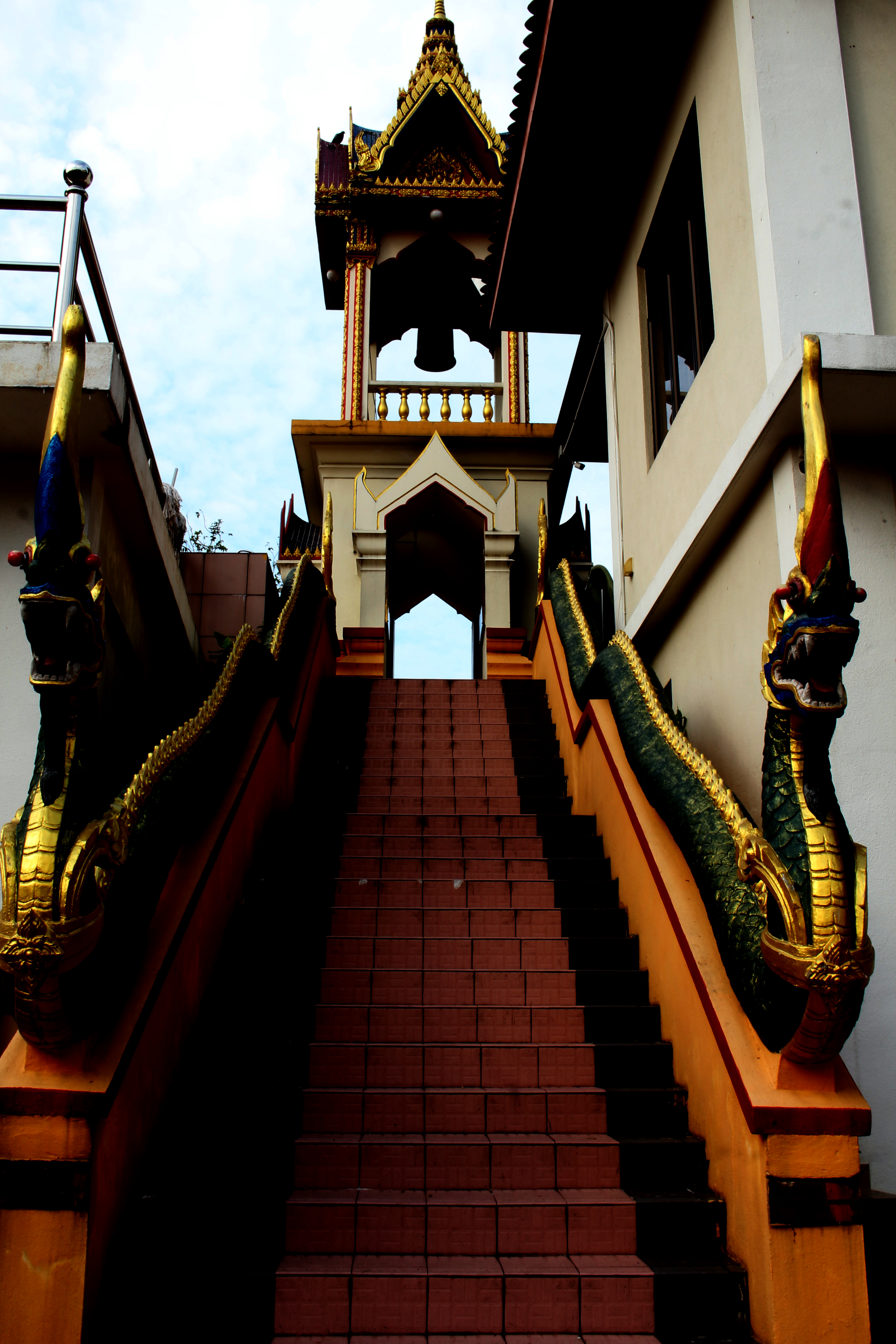
Stairs towards the main shrine hall.

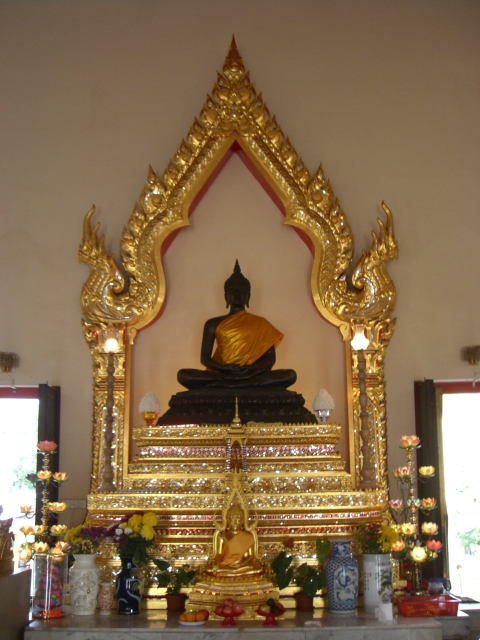
Lord Buddha Thammeen in the main shrine hall.

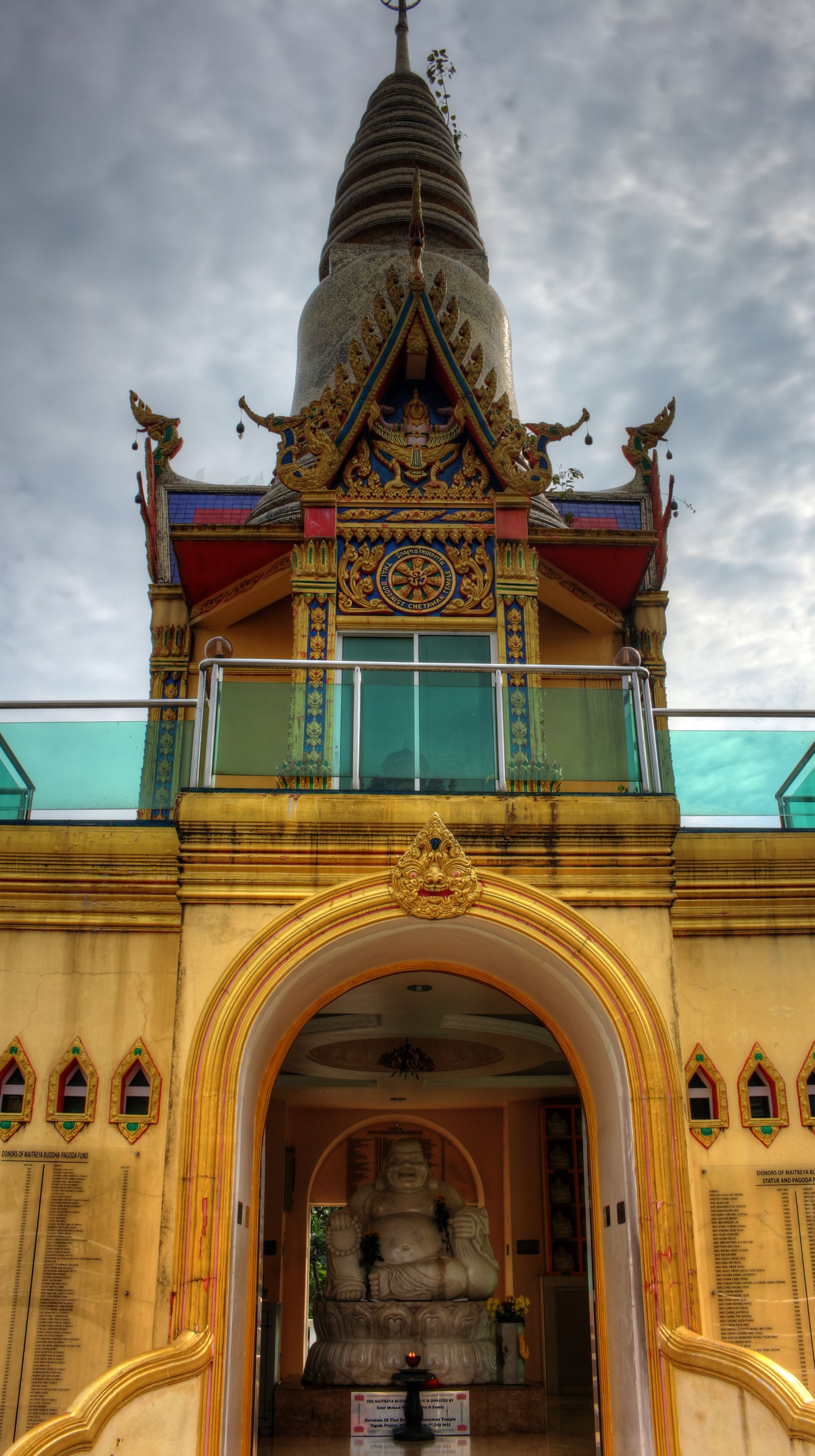
Budai in the temple compound.

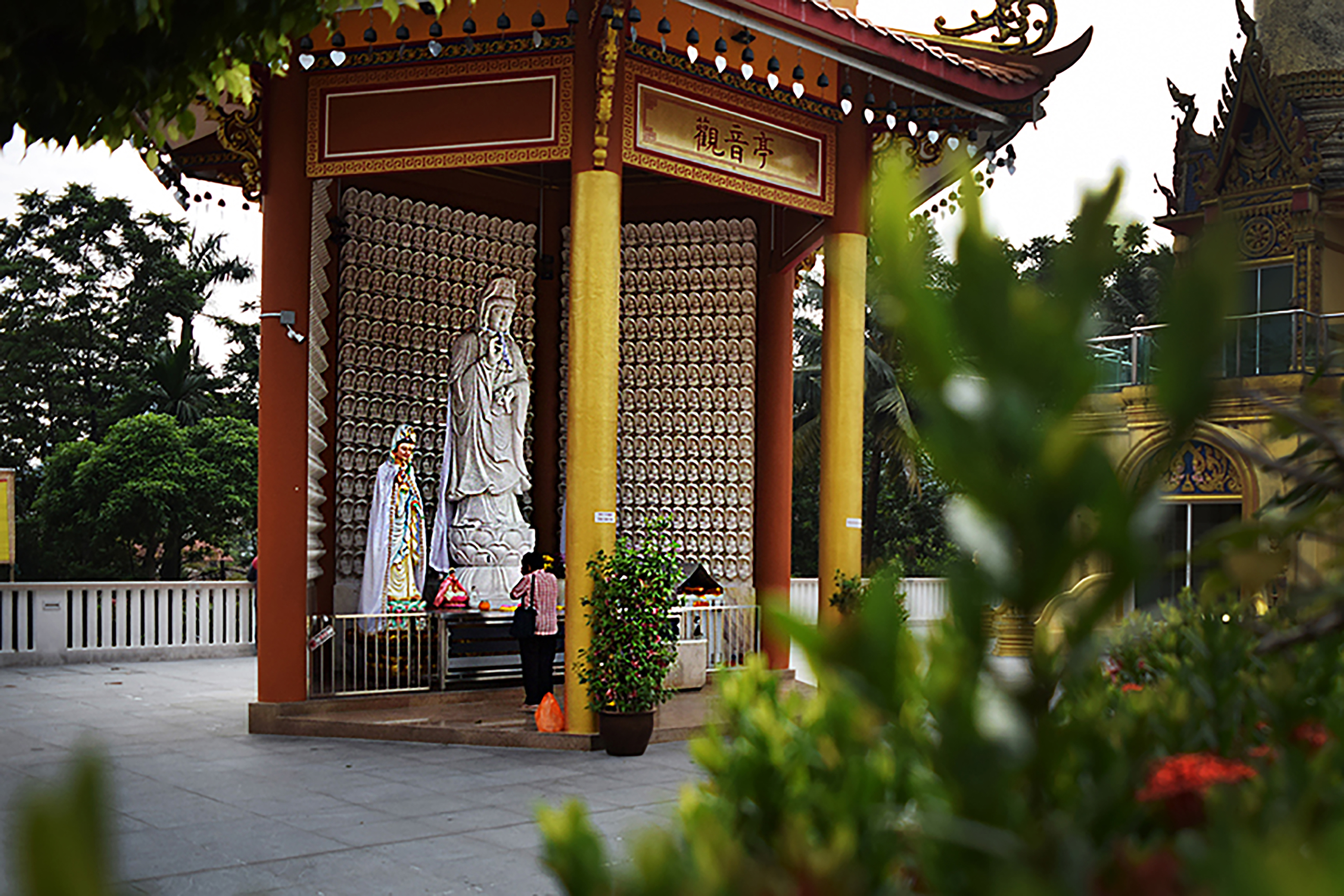
Guan Yin in the temple compound.

== News articles ==
- "With temples closed, Wesak rituals go online". New Straits Times (online). 7 May 2020.
- "Malaya remembers King Bhumibol". New Straits Times (online). 22 October 2017.
