= St. Francis Xavier's Church, Petaling Jaya =

St. Francis Xavier's
- St. Francis Xavier's Church
- St. Francis Xavier's
- Location: Jalan Gasing, Petaling Jaya, Selangor
- Country: Malaysia
- Denomination: Roman Catholic
- Website: sfx.com.my

Architecture
- Style: Neo-Baroque (interior)
- Years built: 1961

Administration
- Diocese: Kuala Lumpur

Clergy
- Rector: Rev Fr. Alvin Ng, SJ

St. Francis Xavier's Church is parish of the Catholic Church located at 135, Jalan Gasing, Petaling Jaya, Selangor. The parish church was dedicated in 1957 by the then-Catholic Bishop of Kuala Lumpur, Rt Rev. Tan Sri Dominic Aloysius Vendargon DD; it was one of the only three Catholic parishes established in Petaling Jaya (the others being the Church of the Assumption and the Church of St. Ignatius).

St. Francis Xavier is administered by the Jesuits, the only such parish in Malaysia. The church is built on the ground owned by the Jesuit Fathers in Malaysia, and the Jesuit Residence is located next to the church on the same ground.

A hostel for Catholic students attending the nearby Universiti Malaya was also situated in the same compound. Adjoined to the church is the Catholic High School, a Chinese-type mission school founded and owned by the Marist Brothers.

Ahead of its Golden Jubilee on 3 December 2011, the church underwent major renovations, with the installation of a reredos and several large stained glass panels, depicting the Stations of the Cross, the life of St. Francis Xavier, Christ the Good Shepherd, and Mary, Queen of Heaven, surrounded by a myriad of Jesuit saints and blesseds.

In 2016, the Church underwent further renovations, which involved air conditioning the premises.

== See also ==
- List of Jesuit sites
