= Rajiv Rishyakaran =

Malaysian politician (born 1981)

Yang Berhormat Tuan Rajiv Rishyakaran MLA
- ராஜீவ் ரிசியகரன் راجيۏ ريسهياقرن

Member of the Selangor State Legislative Assembly for Bukit Gasing
- Incumbent
- Assumed office 5 May 2013
- Preceded by: Edward Lee Poh Lin (PR–DAP)
- Majority: 15,842 (2013); 25,835 (2018); 24,972 (2023)

Faction represented in Selangor State Legislative Assembly
- 2013–2018: Democratic Action Party
- 2018–: Pakatan Harapan

Personal details
- Born: Rajiv s/o Rishyakaran; 12 October 1981 (age 44) Kuala Lumpur, Malaysia
- Citizenship: Malaysian
- Party: Democratic Action Party (DAP)
- Other political affiliations: Pakatan Rakyat (PR) (2008–2015); Pakatan Harapan (PH) (since 2015)
- Spouse: Ana Gella Rajiv (nee Opong) (divorced 2022)
- Children: Julia Alexandria; Elisha Jael; Noah Ezekiel
- Parents: Rishyakaran s/o Karthigasu (father); Rajini d/o Chandrapal (mother)
- Website: http://www.rajiv4malaysia.com/

Rajiv s/o Rishyakaran (Jawi: راجيۏ ريسهياقرن; Tamil: ராஜீவ் ரிசியகரன்) (born 12 October 1981) is a Malaysian politician who has served as Member of the Selangor State Legislative Assembly (MLA) for Bukit Gasing since May 2013. He is a member of the Democratic Action Party (DAP), a component party of the Pakatan Harapan (PH) coalition and formerly Pakatan Rakyat (PR) coalition. His predecessor as Bukit Gasing MLA is the late Edward Lee Poh Lin whose untimely death in 2011 left the seat vacant for two years before the 2013 Selangor state election.

== Early life and education ==
Rajiv Rishyakaran was born on 12 October 1981, at Hospital University, Kuala Lumpur. Rajiv is the eldest of five (5) brothers. His father, Rishyakaran Karthigasu (1949-2023) was a retired Ministry of Health officer whilst his mother, Rajini Chandrapal (1953-) retired from teaching to be a homemaker. He is of 4th generation Malaysian Tamil descent.

Rajiv was born in the Klang Valley, apart from a brief relocation to Ipoh, Perak (from age 10–15) where his father was based as a civil servant. The family later moved to Subang Jaya, Selangor where Rajiv finished secondary school.

Rajiv attended Kolej Universiti Teknologi Tun Hussein Onn, Johor, graduating in 2003 with a degree in Electrical Engineering specializing in Instrumentation & Automation. Upon graduation, Rajiv worked in Kuala Lumpur as a project engineer with Prestige Engineering Sdn. Bhd.

Rajiv was married in 2011 to Ana Gella, and later separated in 2021. They both share 3 children Julia (born 2017), Elisha (born 2018), and Noah (born 2021).

== Political career ==
=== Early involvement ===
Rajiv's involvement in politics began when friend and fellow church member, Hannah Yeoh Tseow Suan was fielded to run for the state seat of Subang Jaya in 2008.

==== Democratic Action Party (DAP) ====
Rajiv joined the Democratic Action Party (DAP) in 2008 and, along with Hannah Yeoh and Edward Ling, was one of the founding members of DAP's USJ branch. In 2009, Rajiv was appointed DAP Youth Selangor organizing secretary. He was elected DAP Youth Selangor State Secretary in 2012 and appointed to the DAP Youth National Executive Committee (NEC).

==== Majlis Perbandaran Subang Jaya (MPSJ) ====
In 2009, Rajiv was appointed Majlis Perbandaran Subang Jaya (MPSJ) Councillor, where he stayed until the 2013 elections. While in MPSJ, he was responsible for Zone 3 (USJ 2-15) until June 2012 when he was reassigned to Zone 3 (SS12-19) until May 2013. Throughout his tenure at MPSJ, he simultaneously served as Hannah Yeoh's Special Assistant. The Subang Jaya Urban Forest and the Subang Jaya Voluntary Patrol Unit (VPU), among others, were attributed to the role he played within the council and as Yeoh's assistant.

=== Selangor State Legislative Assembly ===
Three (3) days before the Nomination day for the 2013 General Elections, Rajiv was picked to contest the state seat of Bukit Gasing, taking over Kasthuri Patto who ran for the Parliamentary seat of Batu Kawan, Penang. Rajiv listed several concerns as part of his GE13 campaign, pledging to be corruption-free and to champion:

- Development issues and its effect on quality of life
- Bettering traffic conditions and public transport
- Reducing crime and improving security
- Enhancing the public consultation process
- Improving the local council
- Local government elections
- Enquiry on freehold and leasehold land
- Conserving the environment

Rajiv received almost 78% of the total votes, giving him a landslide victory over Gerakan's Juan Sei Chang and Independent candidates Mak Khuin Weng and Simon Lee Chung Hsin.

In the 2018 General Elections, Rajiv contested and managed to win the second-term reelection for his Bukit Gasing state seat again.

In July 2019, he submitted a motion to the Selangor State Assembly which aimed to prohibit party hopping among elected representatives in the State. This came after the downfall of the Pakatan Harapan Government, after Bersatu and majority of its members left the coalition to form Perikatan Nasional with UMNO.

==== Ministry of Energy, Science and Technology, Environment, and Climate Change ====
After Pakatan Harapan's unprecedented triumph over Barisan Nasional in 2018, Yeo Bee Yin was appointed the Minister for Energy, Science and Technology, Environment, and Climate Change (MESTECC). Yeo subsequently appointed Rajiv as her Special Functions Officer, where he not only assisted in key ministerial processes but was also appointed into the board of the Sustainable Energy Development Authority, where he advocated for the widespread use of solar energy in the country.

==== Focus areas ====
Rajiv is DAP Socialist Youth's (DAPSY) National Assistant Secretary of Publicity and was co-opted as DAP Selangor state committee member in 2013 and 2015. In the Selangor state assembly, Rajiv is a member of the Select Committees (Jawatankuasa Pilihan) on Local Government and Water Resources Management.

Rajiv's areas of interest are town planning, affordable housing and improving public transportation. Along with other state assembly representatives, he consistently called for a holistic "traffic masterplan" and believes that funds allocated for transportation will be better spent on extending the reach & connectivity of public transportation rather than building more highways. He is vocal about the need to replace ageing infrastructure.

He is widely considered as the "GOAT" in Selangor State Assembly.

== Election results ==
Selangor State Legislative Assembly
Year	Constituency	Candidate	Votes	Pct	Opponent(s)	Votes	Pct	Ballots cast	Majority	Turnout
2013	N34 Bukit Gasing	Rajiv Rishyakaran (DAP)	21,168	78.55%	Juan Sei Chang (Gerakan)	5,326	19.76%	27,222	15,842	78.71%
2013	N34 Bukit Gasing	Rajiv Rishyakaran (DAP)	21,168	78.55%	Simon Lee Chung Hsin (IND)	287	1.06%	27,222	15,842	78.71%
2013	N34 Bukit Gasing	Rajiv Rishyakaran (DAP)	21,168	78.55%	Mak Khuin Weng (IND)	168	0.62%	27,222	15,842	78.71%
2018	N34 Bukit Gasing	Rajiv Rishyakaran (DAP)	29,366	86.92%	Chai Ko Thing (Gerakan)	3,531	10.45%	34,080	25,835	78.27%
2018	N34 Bukit Gasing	Rajiv Rishyakaran (DAP)	29,366	86.92%	David Sew Kah Heng (IKATAN)	890	2.63%	34,080	25,835	78.27%
2023	N34 Bukit Gasing	Rajiv Rishyakaran (DAP)	28,227	83.47%	Nallan Dhanabalan (Gerakan)	3,255	9.63%	33,818	24,972	62.35%
2023	N34 Bukit Gasing	Rajiv Rishyakaran (DAP)	28,227	83.47%	VKK Raja @ Kalyana Rajasekaran Teagarajan (MUDA)	1,390	4.11%	33,818	24,972	62.35%

== See also ==
- Bukit Gasing (state constituency)
