= Bukit Gasing (state constituency) =

Malaysian state constituency

Bukit Gasing (N34)
Selangor constituency

State constituency
- Legislature: Selangor State Legislative Assembly
MLA
Rajiv Rishyakaran
PH
- Constituency created: 1984
- First contested: 1986
- Last contested: 2023

Demographics
- Electors (2023): 54,238

Bukit Gasing is a state constituency in Selangor, Malaysia, that has been represented in the Selangor State Legislative Assembly since 1986. It has been represented by Rajiv Rishyakaran of Pakatan Harapan (PH) and formerly Pakatan Rakyat (PR) coalitions since May 2013.

The state constituency was created in the 1984 redistribution and is mandated to return a single member to the Selangor State Legislative Assembly under the first past the post voting system.

== Demographics ==
Ethnic breakdown of Bukit Gasing's electorate as of 2023
1. Chinese (62.1%)
2. Indian (17.2%)
3. Malay (16.9%)
4. Other ethnicities (3.79%)

== History ==
=== Polling districts ===
According to the federal gazette issued on 30 March 2018, the Bukit Gasing constituency is divided into 20 polling districts.

State constituency	Polling Districts	Code	Location
Bukit Gasing（N34）	Seksyen 17 Utara	105/34/01	SK Sri Damai
Bukit Gasing（N34）	Seksyen 17 Barat	105/34/02	SK Sri Damai
Bukit Gasing（N34）	Seksyen 17 Tengah	105/34/03	SK Sri Damai
Bukit Gasing（N34）	Seksyen 17 Selatan	105/34/04	Dewan Al-Malik Faisal (Pusat Asasi UIAM)
Bukit Gasing（N34）	Seksyen 16	105/34/05	SMK Sultan Abdul Samad
Bukit Gasing（N34）	Jalan Bukit	105/34/06	SK Sultan Alam Shah (Satu); SK Sultan Alam Shah (Dua)
Bukit Gasing（N34）	Jalan Semangat	105/34/07	SMK (Laki-Laki) Bukit Bintang Jalan Utara
Bukit Gasing（N34）	Seksyen 5 Utara	105/34/08	SMK La Salle PJ
Bukit Gasing（N34）	Taman Jaya	105/34/09	SMJK Katholik
Bukit Gasing（N34）	Kawasan Assunta Convent	105/34/10	SMK Assunta
Bukit Gasing（N34）	Kawasan Bandar Baharu	105/34/11	SK La Salle PJ
Bukit Gasing（N34）	Jalan Sungai Jernih	106/35/12	SK (L) Bukit Bintang (1); SK (L) Bukit Bintang (2)
Bukit Gasing（N34）	Seksyen Satu Petaling Jaya	105/34/13	SK (1) Jalan 1/10 Petaling Jaya; SK (2) Jalan 1/10 Petaling Jaya
Bukit Gasing（N34）	Kawasan Bangunan K.K.P.L	105/34/14	SMK (P) Taman Petaling
Bukit Gasing（N34）	Seksyen 5 Selatan	105/34/15	SMK (P) Taman Petaling
Bukit Gasing（N34）	Seksyen 17 A	105/34/16	SJK (C) Chung Hwa Damansara
Bukit Gasing（N34）	Seksyen 19	105/34/17	SK Taman Sea
Bukit Gasing（N34）	Seksyen 14 Utara	105/34/18	SK Sri Petaling
Bukit Gasing（N34）	Seksyen 14 Selatan	105/34/19	SMK Sri Utama
Bukit Gasing（N34）	Seksyen 2 Petaling Jaya	105/34/20	SJK (C) Chen Moh

=== Representation history ===
Members of the Legislative Assembly for Bukit Gasing
Assembly	No	Years	Member	Party
Constituency created from Petaling Jaya
7th	N28	1986–1990	Tai Sin Piaw (戴成埠)	DAP
8th	N28	1990–1995	Teong Shyan Chyuan (张贤全)	GR (DAP)
9th	N27	1995–1999	Teng Chang Khim (邓章钦)	GR (DAP)
10th	N27	1999–2004	Lim Thuang Seng (林传盛)	BN (GERAKAN)
11th	N34	2004–2008	Lim Thuang Seng (林传盛)	BN (GERAKAN)
12th	N34	2008–2011	Edward Lee Poh Lin (李宝霖)	PR (DAP)
12th	N34	2011–2013	Vacant (Note: Vacant from 20 December 2011 until the 2013 Malaysian general election due to the incumbent died in office. No by-election was held due to the next general election was less than a year and half away.)	
13th	N34	2013–2015	Rajiv Rishyakaran	PR (DAP)
13th	N34	2015–2018	Rajiv Rishyakaran	PH (DAP)
14th	N34	2018–2023	Rajiv Rishyakaran	PH (DAP)
15th	N34	2023–present	Rajiv Rishyakaran	PH (DAP)

== Election results ==
Selangor state election, 2023
Party	Candidate	Votes	%	∆%
PH	Rajiv Rishyakaran	28,227	83.48	▼3.44
PN	Nallan Dhanabalan	3,255	9.61	▲9.61
MUDA	Kalyana Rajasekaran Teagarajan	1,390	4.10	▲4.10
Total valid votes		32,872	100.00	
Total rejected ballots		110		
Unreturned ballots		63		
Turnout		33,045	60.93	▼17.34
Registered electors		54,238		
Majority		24,972	73.87	▼2.59
PH hold		Swing		

Selangor state election, 2018
Party	Candidate	Votes	%	∆%
PKR	Rajiv Rishyakaran	29,366	86.92	▲86.92
BN	Chai Ko Thing	3,531	10.45	▼9.31
PAS	David Sew Kah Heng	890	2.63	▲2.63
Total valid votes		33,787	100.00	
Total rejected ballots		187		
Unreturned ballots		106		
Turnout		34,080	78.27	▼0.44
Registered electors		45,539		
Majority		25,835	76.46	▲17.95
PKR hold		Swing		

Selangor state election, 2013
Party	Candidate	Votes	%	∆%
DAP	Rajiv Rishyakaran	21,168	78.55	▲9.10
BN	Juan Sei Chang	5,326	19.76	▼10.79
Independent	Simon Lee Chung Hsin	287	1.06	▲1.06
Independent	Mak Khuin Weng	168	0.62	▲0.62
Total valid votes		26,949	100.00	
Total rejected ballots		229		
Unreturned ballots		44		
Turnout		27,222	78.71	▲9.77
Registered electors		34,584		
Majority		15,842	58.79	▲19.89
DAP hold		Swing		
Source(s) "Federal Government Gazette - Notice of Contested Election, State Legislative Assembly for the State of Selangor [P.U. (B) 192/2013]" (PDF). Attorney General's Chambers of Malaysia. 26 April 2013. Archived from the original (PDF) on 29 December 2019. "Federal Government Gazette - Results of Contested Election and Statements of the Poll after the Official Addition of Votes, State Constituencies for the State of Selangor [P.U. (B) 233/2013]" (PDF). Attorney General's Chambers of Malaysia. 22 May 2013. Archived from the original (PDF) on 2 October 2018.

Selangor state election, 2008
Party	Candidate	Votes	%	∆%
DAP	Edward Lee Poh Lin	15,735	69.45	▲28.71
BN	Lim Thuang Seng	6,923	30.55	▼28.71
Total valid votes		22,658	100.00	
Total rejected ballots		214		
Unreturned ballots		3		
Turnout		22,875	68.94	▲4.41
Registered electors		33,183		
Majority		8,812	38.90	▲20.38
DAP gain from BN		Swing		?

Selangor state election, 2004
Party	Candidate	Votes	%	∆%
BN	Lim Thuang Seng	13,057	59.26	▲6.99
DAP	John Chung Yoong Ying	8,976	40.74	▼6.99
Total valid votes		22,033	100.00	
Total rejected ballots		267		
Unreturned ballots		23		
Turnout		22,323	64.53	▼2.39
Registered electors		34,593		
Majority		4,081	18.52	▲13.98
BN hold		Swing		

Selangor state election, 1999
Party	Candidate	Votes	%	∆%
BN	Lim Thuang Seng	11,771	52.27	▲5.28
DAP	Hew Kuan Yau	10,750	47.73	▼5.28
Total valid votes		22,521	100.00	
Total rejected ballots		272		
Unreturned ballots		86		
Turnout		22,879	66.92	▲2.34
Registered electors		34,189		
Majority		1,021	4.54	▼1.48
BN gain from DAP		Swing		?

Selangor state election, 1995
Party	Candidate	Votes	%	∆%
DAP	Teng Chang Khim	11,348	53.01	▼13.56
BN	Lim Thuang Seng	10,058	46.99	▲13.56
Total valid votes		21,406	100.00	
Total rejected ballots		355		
Unreturned ballots		128		
Turnout		21,889	64.58	▼1.36
Registered electors		33,894		
Majority		1,290	6.02	▼27.13
DAP hold		Swing		

Selangor state election, 1990
Party	Candidate	Votes	%	∆%
DAP	Teong Shyan Chyuan	12,848	66.57	▲6.04
BN	Soong Siew Hoong	6,451	33.43	▼4.42
Total valid votes		19,299	100.00	
Total rejected ballots		301		
Unreturned ballots		0		
Turnout		19,600	65.94	▼2.08
Registered electors		29,726		
Majority		6,397	33.15	▲10.47
DAP hold		Swing		

Selangor state election, 1986
Party	Candidate	Votes	%
DAP	Tai Sin Piaw	12,255	60.53
BN	Soong Siew Hoong	7,663	37.85
SDP	Au Keng Wah	327	1.62
Total valid votes		20,245	100.00
Total rejected ballots		250	
Unreturned ballots		0	
Turnout		20,495	68.02
Registered electors		30,129	
Majority		4,592	22.68
This was a new constituency created.
