= Catholic High School, Petaling Jaya =

School in Petaling Jaya, Selangor, Malaysia

- 八打灵公教国民型华文中学; Sekolah Menengah Jenis Kebangsaan Katholik, Petaling Jaya
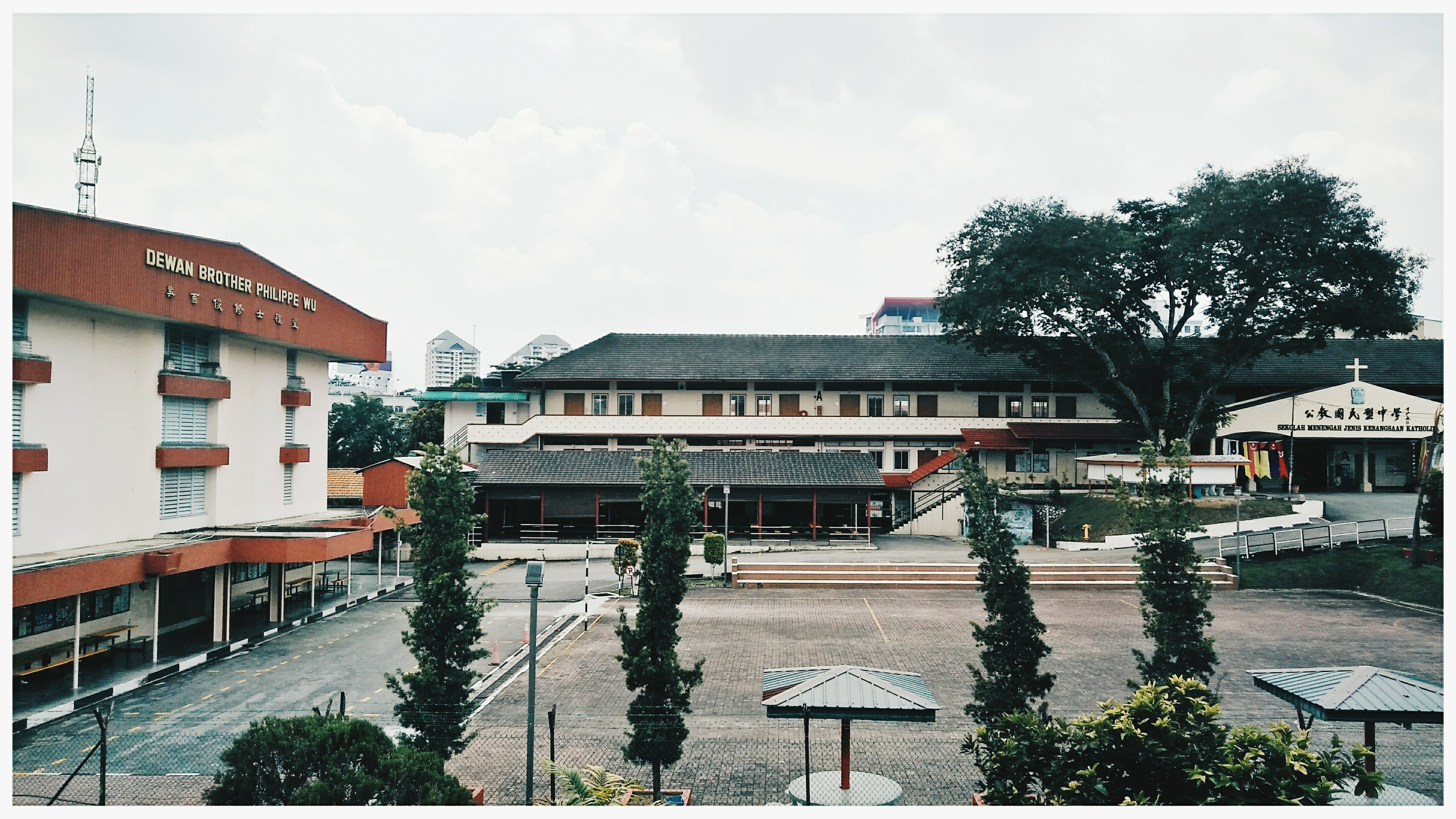

Location
- Jalan 10/3, Seksyen 10; Petaling Jaya, Selangor; Malaysia; 3.107431°N 101.651843°E

Information
- Other name: CHSPJ
- Type: National-type Chinese secondary school
- Motto: Taat dan Berusaha (Malay) 忠诚勤朴 (Chinese) (Loyal and Striving)
- Religious affiliations: Roman Catholic, Society of Mary (Marist)
- Established: 1956; 70 years ago
- Founder: Marist Brothers; Philippe Wu
- School district: Petaling
- Educational authority: PPD Petaling Utama
- Oversight: Ministry of Education Malaysia, PIBG (Parent-Teachers Association)
- School code: BEB8653
- Chairman: Boscoe Aang Yuan Neh
- Principal: Benjamin Tan Yao Hui
- Teaching staff: 153
- Forms: 1–6
- Gender: Co-educational
- Enrollment: 2,863 (June 2022)
- Language: English, Chinese, Malay
- Colours: Sky blue, white, red
- Accreditations: Cluster School of Excellence
- Yearbook: 2025: Resilience: 韌
- Affiliations: Catholic High School Alumni Association chsaa.com.my
- Website: chspj.edu.my sgkatholik.smjk.edu.my
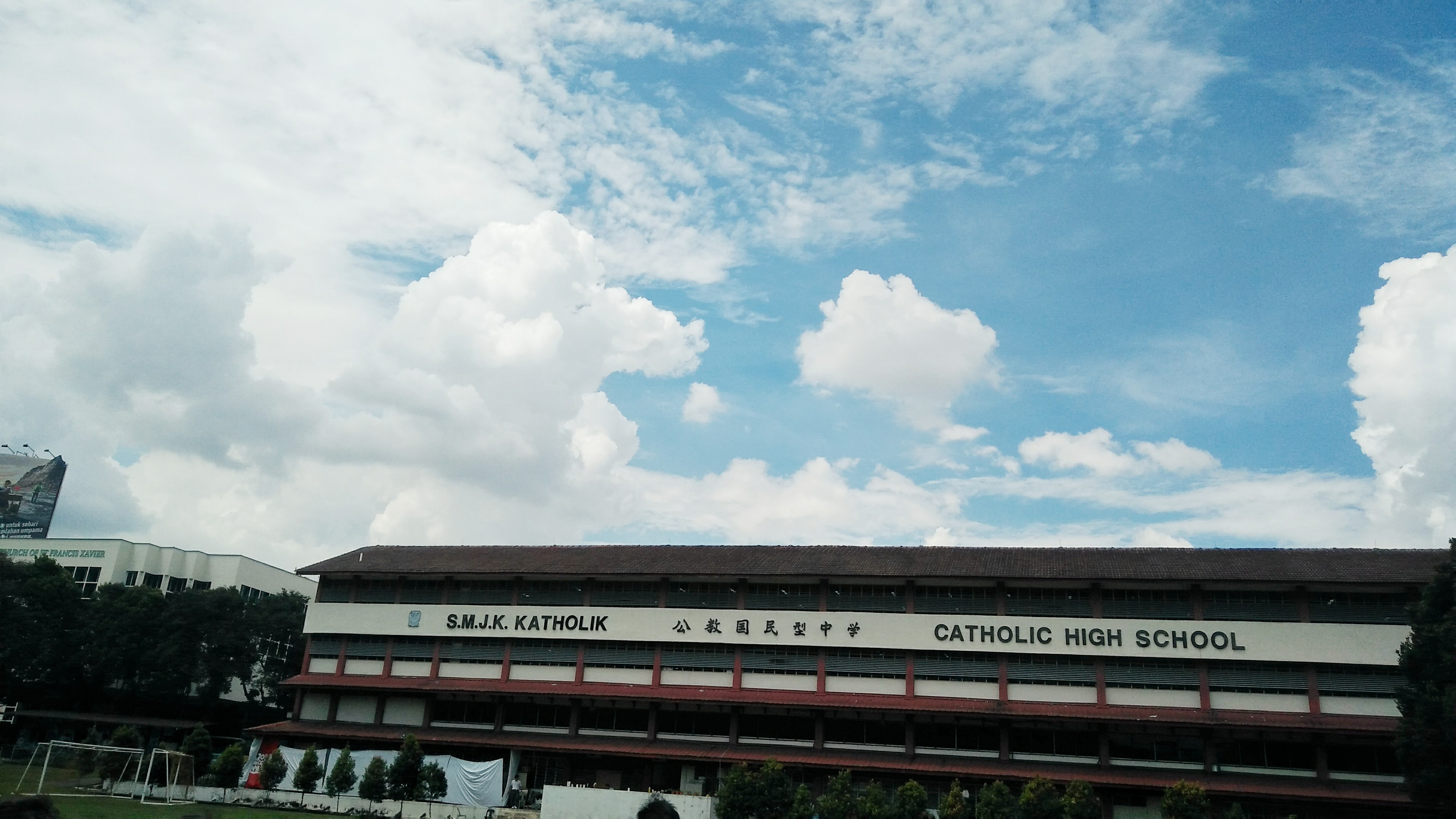
- Last updated: 2 January 2023

Catholic High School, Petaling Jaya
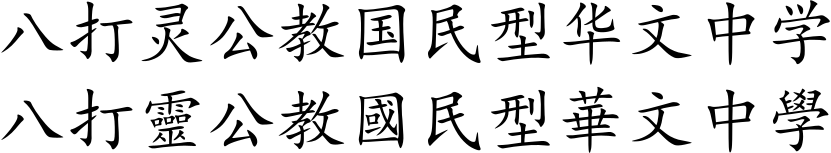
- Catholic High School, Petaling Jaya in Simplified Chinese (top) and Traditional Chinese character (below)
- Traditional Chinese: 公教國民型華文中學
- Simplified Chinese: 公教国民型华文中学
Transcriptions
Standard Mandarin
- Hanyu Pinyin: Gōngjiào Guómínxíng Huáwén Zhōngxué
Yue: Cantonese
- Jyutping: Gung1 gaau3 gwok3 man4 jing4 waa4 man4 zung1 hok6

Catholic High School, Petaling Jaya (Malay: Sekolah Menengah Jenis Kebangsaan Katholik; Chinese: 公教中学), commonly known as CHSPJ or SMJK Katholik, is a co-educational national-type (Chinese) secondary school in Petaling Jaya, Selangor, Malaysia. It was founded in 1956 by Reverend Brother Philippe Wu of the Marist Brothers as a private Catholic boys' school and later became a government-aided conforming school under the national education system. The school is located on a 10-acre campus in Seksyen 10 and has grown to over 3,000 students from Form 1 through Form 6. It was designated a Cluster School of Excellence in 2011.

== History ==
The school was established in 1956 by Philippe Wu of the Marist Brothers, who had been the second principal of Catholic High School, Singapore. Initially operating in Kuala Lumpur, it moved to its present location in Petaling Jaya in 1958. Over the decades, it expanded from a small cohort of 88 students to thousands, with new blocks and facilities added. In 1962, it became a national-type conforming school (SMJK), and in 1985 it began admitting female students. Administration transitioned from Marist Brothers to lay leadership in 1989.

In the 1950s and 1960s, the Marist Brothers set up other schools across Malaya and the North Borneo States (now Malaysia), including in Bentong (1957), Melaka (1958), Sibu (1960), and Tanjung Malim (1960). The schools in Singapore, Petaling Jaya, Melaka, and Sibu continue to share the same school anthem, with only the opening phrase adapted to reflect their respective locations, namely ‘公教中学 屹立星洲’ (Singapore), ‘公教中学 屹立雪州’ (Petaling Jaya), ‘公教中学 屹立甲州’ (Melaka), and ‘公教中学 屹立砂州’ (Sibu).

== Campus and Facilities ==
The school is on a 10-acre site in Section 10, Petaling Jaya. It has academic blocks, science and computer labs, a library, a multi-purpose hall named after its founder, and a sports centre opened in 2005. The campus includes a sports field, smart 5G and Artificial intelligence classrooms and squash courts. It is within walking distance of the Taman Jaya LRT station and the historical Taman Jaya urban park.

== Academics ==
Catholic High School follows the Malaysian national curriculum while emphasising trilingual education in Malay, English, and Chinese. It offers secondary education from Form 1 to Form 5 and Form 6 (STPM) in both Science and Arts streams. The school has consistently performed well in national exams. In the 2022 SPM examination, it achieved a Grade Point Average (GPA) of 2.03, the best result in the Petaling district, according to Deputy Education Minister Lim Hui Ying. Catholic High School was awarded Cluster School of Excellence status in 2011.

== Transportation ==
- Taman Jaya LRT station
- Jalan Gasing Bus Stop

== Academics ==
The school achieved 2.03 of average grade in Sijil Pelajaran Malaysia 2022, which performed the best in the district educational office as said by Lim Hui Ying.

== Extracurricular activities ==
=== Sports ===
The school team Calyx All-Girls finished second in the All-Girls category in Cheer 2015, and they won top prize in Cheer 2018.

=== Music ===
The school band won the 2005 National Level High School Brass Band Competition held in Penang.

== Notable former pupils ==
- William Cheng, businessman
- Fong Kui Lun, politician
- Victor Gu, newscaster and presenter
- Michelle Ng, politician
- Xandria Ooi, journalist and presenter
- Koe Yeet, actress
- Edmund Yeo, film director
- Yeoh Li Tian, chess player
