= Sultan Abdul Aziz Shah Jamek Mosque =

Mosque in Petaling, Selangor, Malaysia

- Masjid Jamek Sultan Abdul Aziz Shah
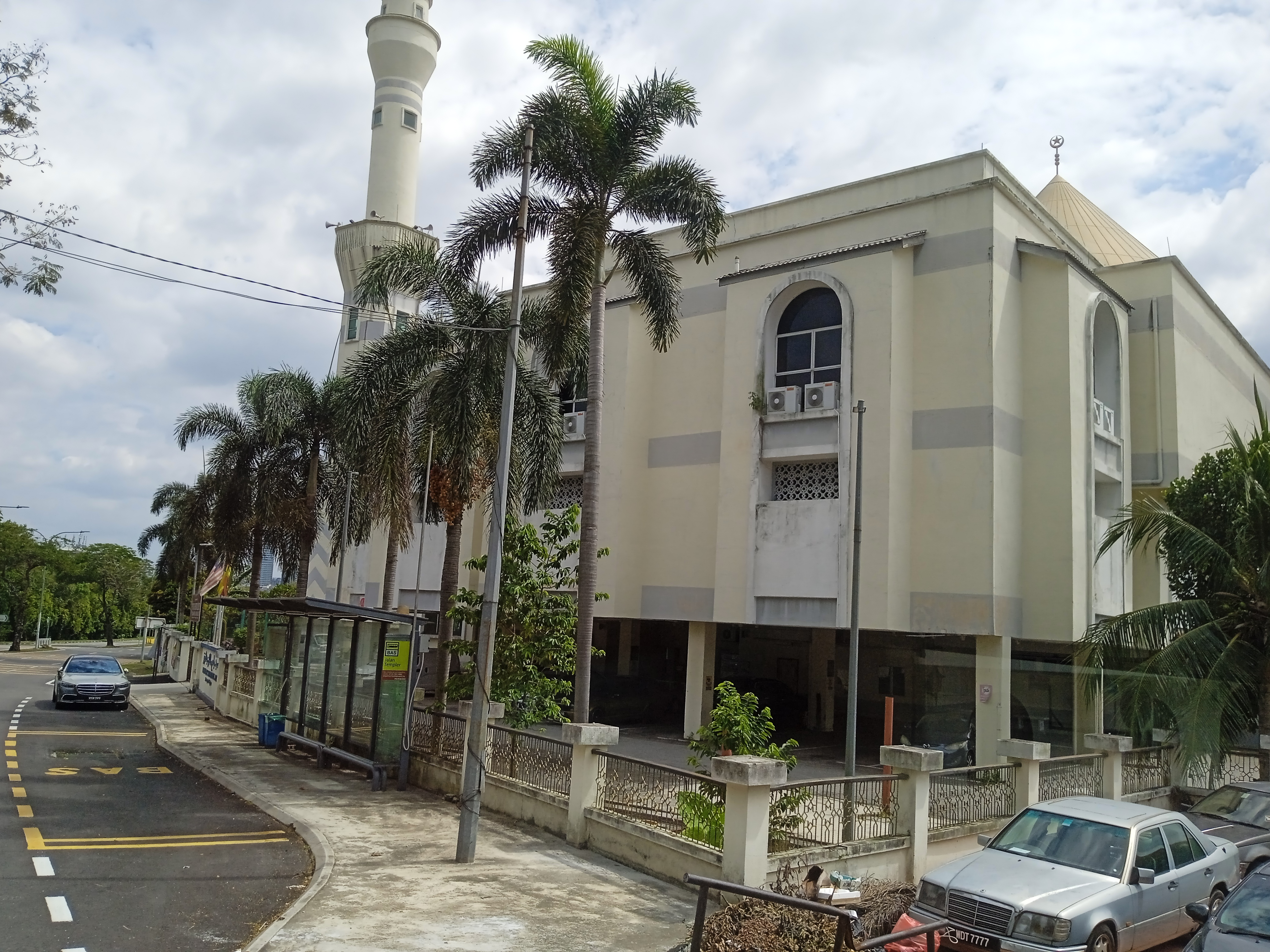

Religion
- Affiliation: Sunni Islam

Location
- Location: Petaling Jaya, Selangor, Malaysia
- Interactive map of Sultan Abdul Aziz Shah Jamek Mosque
- Coordinates: 3.0908°N 101.6504°E

Architecture
- Type: Mosque

The Sultan Abdul Aziz Shah Jamek Mosque is the first mosque in the old town of Petaling Jaya, Selangor, Malaysia.

== See also ==
- Islam in Malaysia
