= Assunta Hospital =

Hospital in Petaling, Selangor, Malaysia

Coordinates: 3°05′36.8″N 101°38′45.0″E

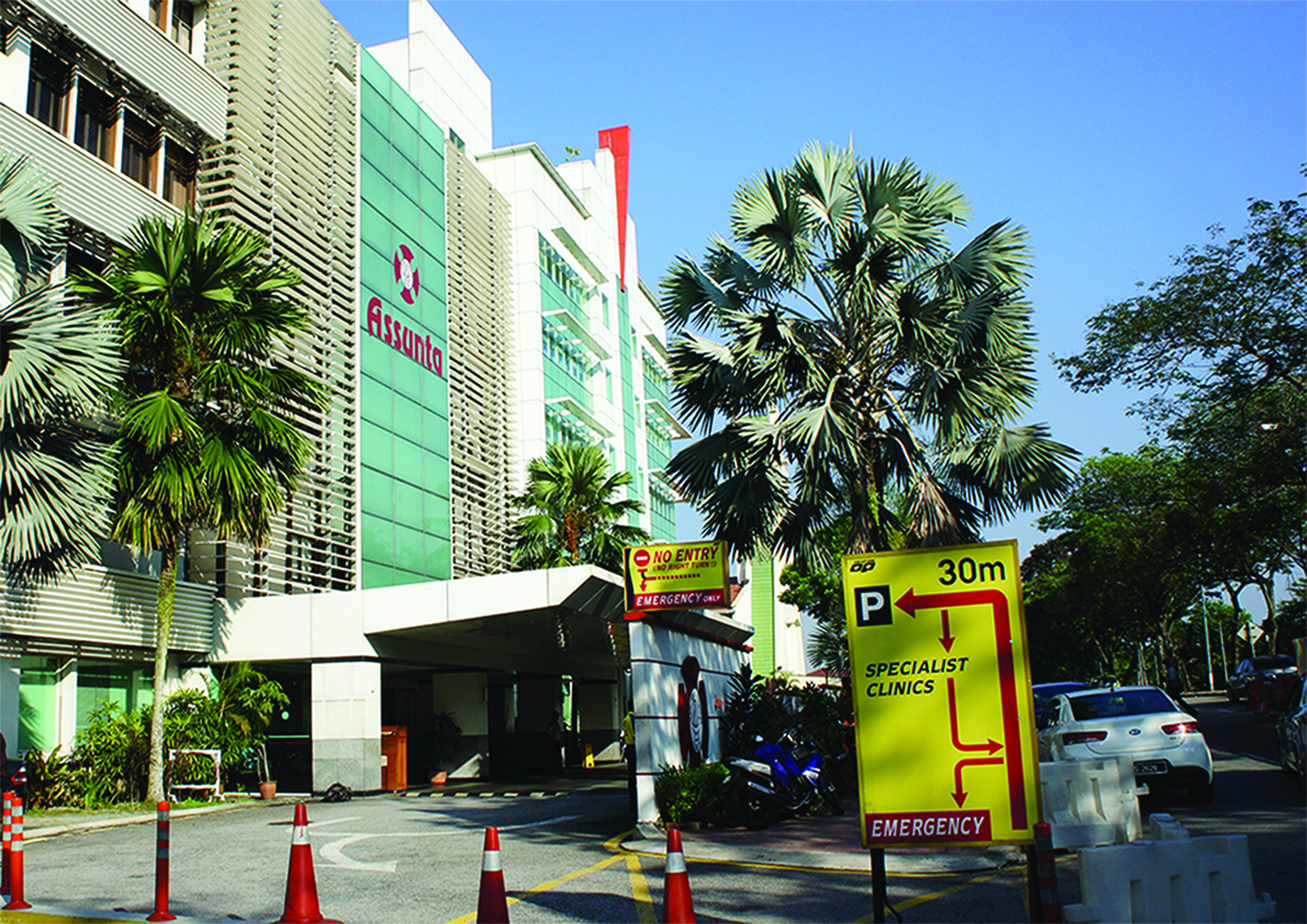

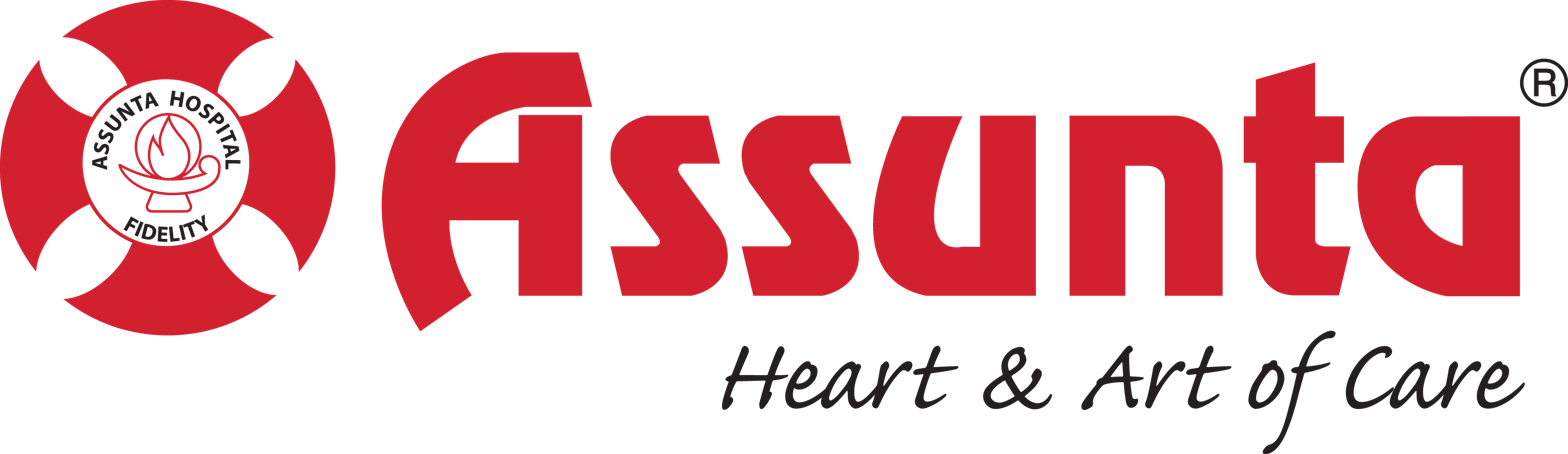

Geography
- Location: Petaling Jaya, Petaling District, Selangor, Malaysia

Organisation
- Care system: Private, not-for-profit

Services
- Emergency department: 24 hours
- Beds: 245

History
- Opened: 1954

Links
- Website: www.assunta.com.my

Assunta Hospital (Chinese: 亞松大医院; Malay: Hospital Assunta) is the first private hospital in Petaling Jaya, Petaling District, Selangor, Malaysia. Assunta Hospital was founded by a group of missionaries from the Franciscan Missionaries of Mary (FMM) in 1954. It is a 245-bed hospital complex. Assunta Hospital is one of the oldest hospitals in Malaysia.

== Assunta Integrated Social Services (ASSISS) ==
Assunta has its own charity wing called Assunta Integrated Social Services (ASSISS). The private hospital, through the ASSISS charity programme, donates 50 per cent of its profits to the extremely poor.
