= Bukit Gasing =

Tropical forest reserve in Malaysia

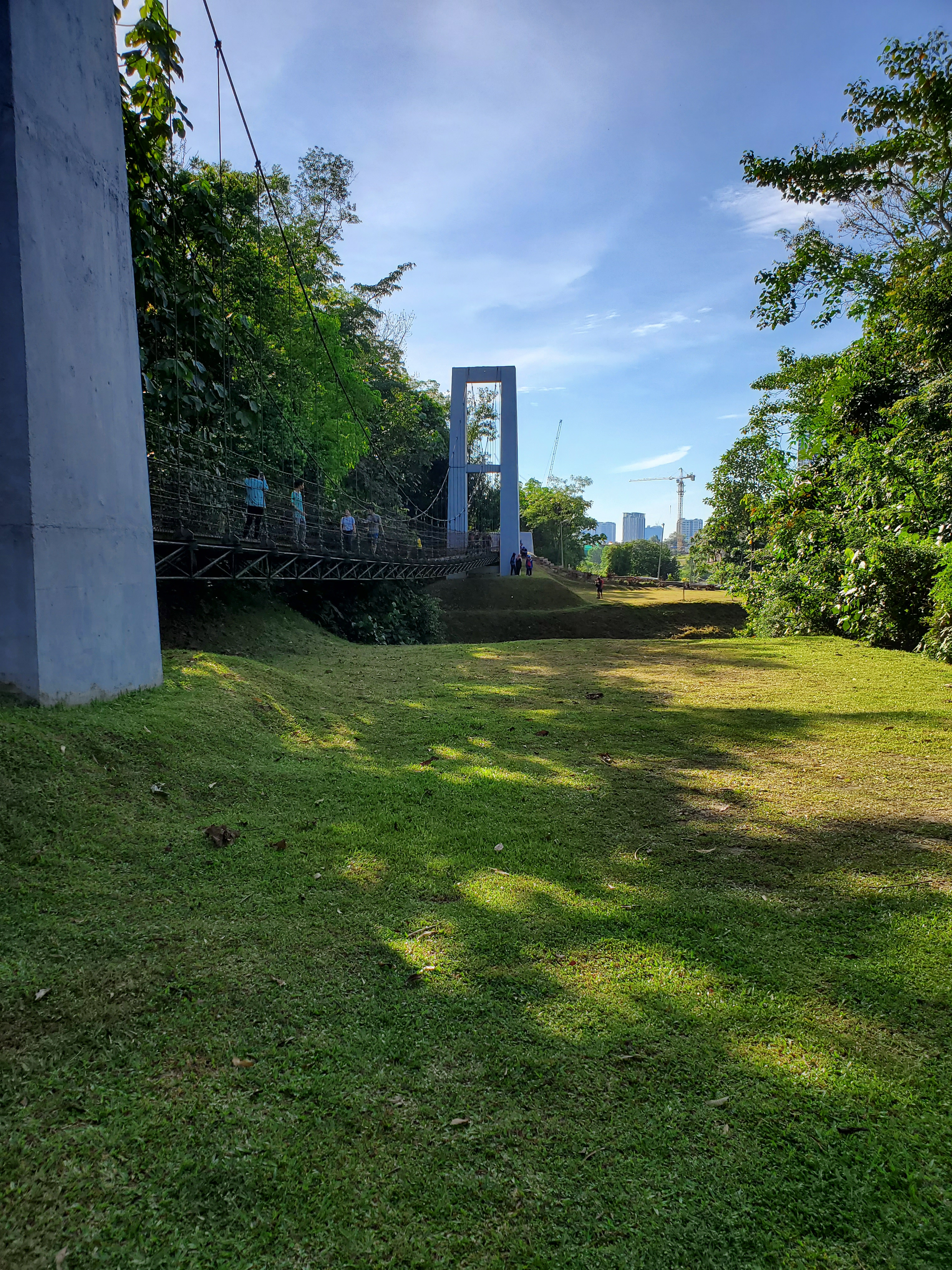
Bukit Gasing in 2020

Bukit Gasing is a tropical forest reserve in Malaysia. It straddles the federal territory of Kuala Lumpur, as well as the state of Selangor. Due to that, the reserve is governed by two different governments—the Kuala Lumpur City Hall and the government of Selangor. There are many hiking trails in Bukit Gasing.

== Geography and wildlife ==
Bukit Gasing is a tropical forest reserve located on the border between Kuala Lumpur and Petaling Jaya, Selangor, in Malaysia. It was a rubber plantation before it became a secondary forest.

Since the park is located in both Kuala Lumpur and Petaling Jaya, it has two entrances, with the main entrance located in Petaling Jaya and the secondary entrance located in Kuala Lumpur.

There are many free hiking trails in Bukit Gasing, and visitors can use them for trail running and hiking. It takes approximately one to two hours to hike each of the trails, and at the end of all the trails is a suspension bridge, a Telekom tower, and a Hindu temple. There is also a river, and during the dry season, the river dries up and becomes another trail for hikers. There are different species of flora and fauna that can be found in the park. One of the birds that can be spotted by visitors is the stripe-throated bulbul.

Bukit Gasing

== Hindu temple ==
In February 2013, the Hindu temple, Sivan Temple, was slated for demolition because it was collapsing due to weakening soil caused by the rainy season. The temple's chairman said that the temple's building plans were not approved by the government when it was built. Following the demolition, new plans for the rebuilding of the temple were submitted to and approved by the government in February 2015.

== Development ==
The Selangor part of Bukit Gasing has officially been declared a "green lung" by the Selangor government, which means that no development works can be carried out on the reserve. However, the Kuala Lumpur part of Bukit Gasing has not been officially gazetted as a "green lung" by the Kuala Lumpur government, although former mayors of Kuala Lumpur have promised to turn the Kuala Lumpur part of Bukit Gasing into protected land. As a result, some of the Kuala Lumpur land was sold to building contractors, and new housing projects were approved by the Kuala Lumpur City Hall government over the protests of nearby residents and Friends of Bukit Gasing, a volunteer group that helps to care for the reserve. The development projects have left parts of Bukit Gasing muddy and treeless.
